= Waianakarua River =

Coordinates: 45°15′S 170°52′E

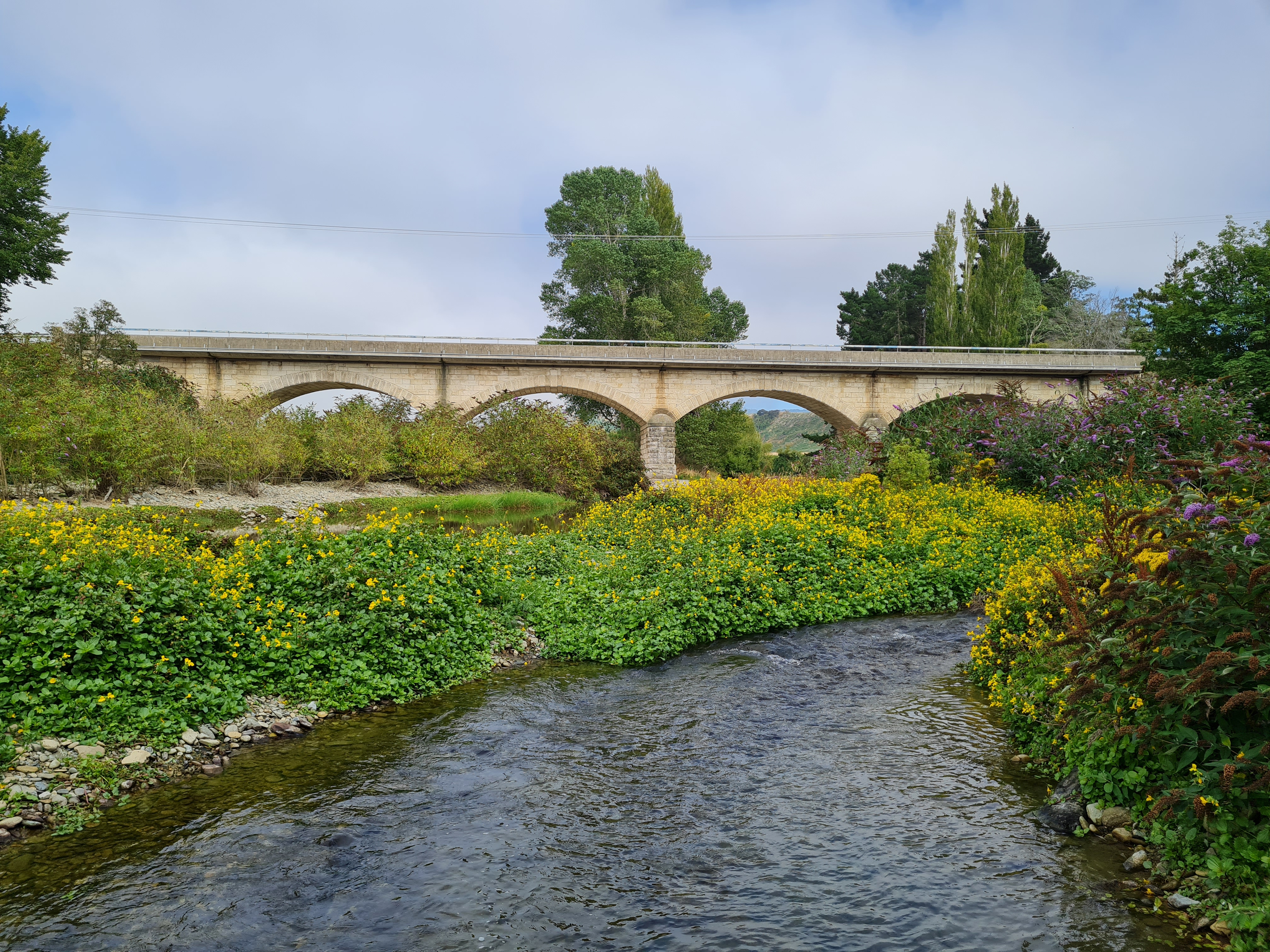
- State Highway 1 bridge over Waianakarua South River

Location
- Country: New Zealand

Physical characteristics
- Source
  - location: Horse Range
  - elevation: 1350 m
- Mouth
  - location: Pacific Ocean, north of Hampden
  - elevation: 0 m
- Length: 33 km
- Basin size: 260 km^{2}

The Waianakarua River is a river in North Otago, New Zealand, flowing into the Pacific Ocean. It is crossed by Highway 1 at Waianakarua, south of Herbert, by an old historic bridge. The river has a catchment size of approximately 260 km^{2}.

The river has three main branches, simply known as the South, Middle, and North Branches. All three branches flow from the slopes of the Horse Range. The South and Middle branches have their source in the hills between Morrisons and Dunback. The North branch rises in several small streams close to Morrisons, the longest of which is called Waddells Creek, which rises 10 km north of Morrisons close to the southern end of the Kakanui Range.

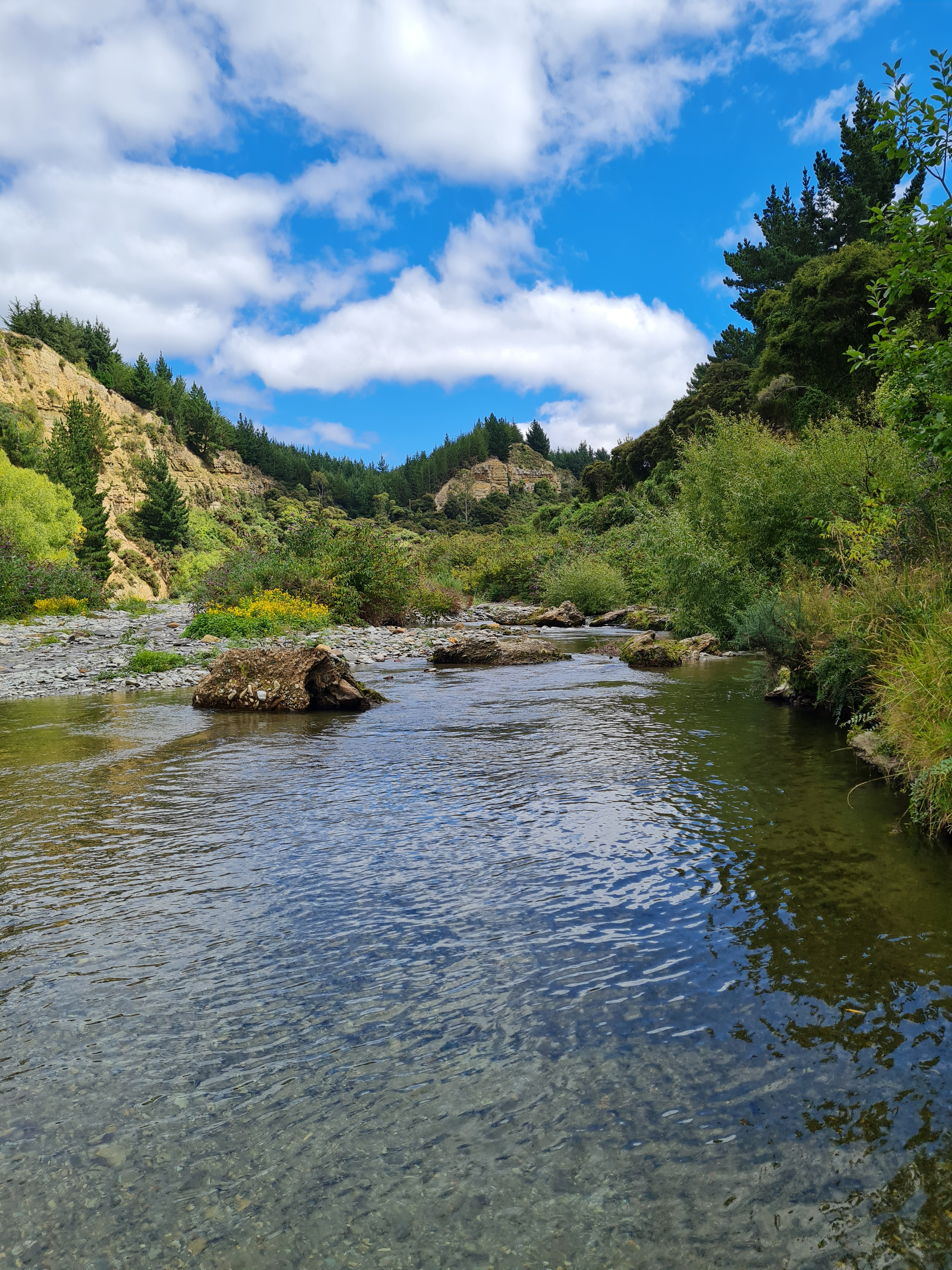
Waianakarua North River, upstream from the State Highway 1 road bridge, Otago, New Zealand

== Etymology ==
The Wainakarua River was known as the Otepopo River in the 19th century.

== Archaeology ==
A notable archaeological site, a pre-European moa-hunter settlement, exists at Tai Rua, just north of the river's mouth.

== See also ==
- List of rivers of New Zealand
