= Glenpark, New Zealand =

Locality in New Zealand

Coordinates: 45°26′S 170°40′E

Glenpark is a lightly populated rural locality in the Otago region of New Zealand's South Island. It is northwest of Palmerston and on the banks of the Shag River. To the west is the locality of Stoneburn.

== Economy ==
Economic activity in and around Glenpark is agricultural, including New Zealand's largest free range chicken farm.

== Transport ==
Glenpark is located between Palmerston and Inch Valley on the route of State Highway 85.

For 104 years, a branch line railway that diverged from the Main South Line in Palmerston passed through Glenpark. This railway originally ran to Dunback with a later sub-branch to Mākareao and was thus collectively known as the Dunback and Makareao Branches. It opened through Glenpark on 29 August 1885; the station was 7.23 km from the junction with the main line, near the halfway point of the 15.2 km long branch. Passenger services were provided solely by mixed trains and due to low patronage, they were cancelled on 10 August 1930 and Glenpark station became freight only. The station had a small goods shed, a loading bank, and a loop to hold 31 wagons.

On 1 January 1968, the Dunback portion of the railway closed and trains ran solely to serve a limeworks facility in Makareao. Local freight ceased to be carried and trains ran through Glenpark without stopping thrice weekly. The line closed entirely on 1 June 1989 and the formation and a disused bridge are still visible in and near Glenpark.
