= Mākareao =

Coordinates: 45°22′S 170°39′E

Mākareao is a lightly populated rural locality in the Otago region of New Zealand's South Island. To the west is Dunback and to the south is Inch Valley and the nearest significantly populated town, Palmerston.

== Economy ==
As with the surrounding area, agriculture is an important economic activity. Deposits of lime are also located in Mākareao and accordingly a limeworks operates. In 1990, Taylor's Lime opened a new plant at Mākareao replacing one formerly operated at Weston.

== Transport ==
No major roads pass through Makareao. State Highway 85 passes through Dunback on the other side of the Shag River from Mākareao.

From 1900 until 1989, Mākareao was the terminus of a short branch line railway. On 29 August 1885, a branch had been opened to Dunback from a junction with the Main South Line in Palmerston, but to provide better access to the lime deposits, a sub-branch was built from Inch Valley to Mākareao. Together, the two lines were known as the Dunback and Makareao Branches and the Mākareao portion served solely the limeworks; it did not carry passengers or general freight. It was just under 4 km long and opened on 31 March 1900. The terminus in Mākareao was a modest affair, with just loading bins for the lime and a loop to hold 26 wagons. On 1 January 1968, the Dunback portion of the branch closed and the 11 km section between Palmerston and Inch Valley operated solely to carry Mākareao lime. The demise of the line was sudden. Trains ran thrice weekly to carry the lime to a Dunedin-based cement factory, and when this factory closed in 1988, the reason for the line's existence disappeared. The line was formally closed on 1 June 1989, but railway remnants remain at the Mākareao terminus and the line's disused formation can still be seen between Mākareao and Inch Valley.
