= Hampden, New Zealand =

Town in Otago, New Zealand

Hampden
- Rural settlement
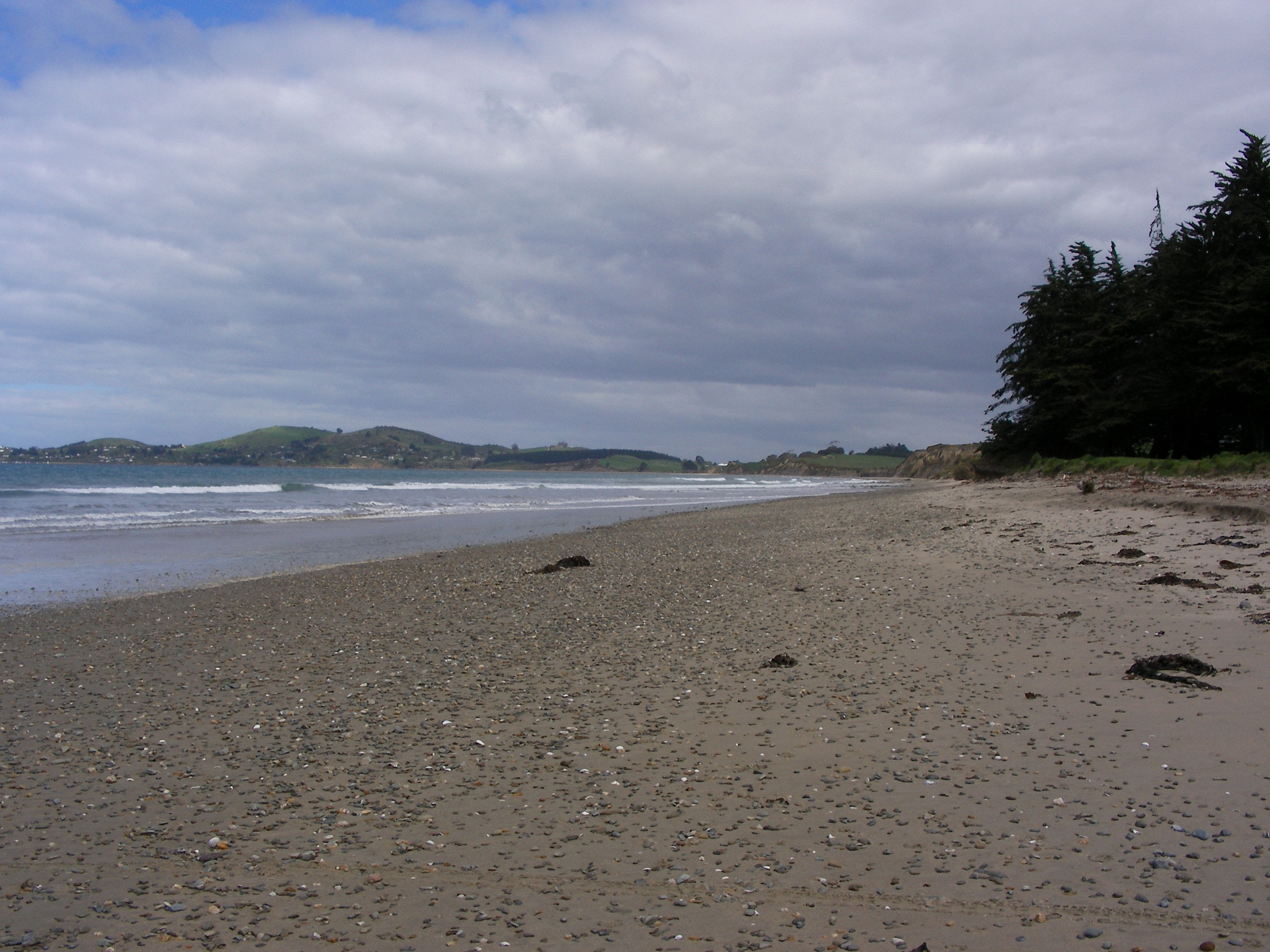
- The beach at Hampden looking south
- Interactive map of Hampden
- Coordinates: 45°19′40″S 170°49′00″E
- Country: New Zealand
- Region: Otago
- Territorial authority: Waitaki District
- Ward: Waihemo Ward
- Community: Waihemo Community
- Electorates: Waitaki; Te Tai Tonga (Māori)

Government
  - Territorial authority: Waitaki District Council
  - Regional council: Otago Regional Council
  - Mayor of Waitaki: Melanie Tavendale
  - Waitaki MP: Miles Anderson
  - Te Tai Tonga MP: Mananui Ramsden

Area
  - Total: 2.56 km^{2} (0.99 sq mi)

Population (June 2025)
  - Total: 410
  - Density: 160/km^{2} (410/sq mi)
- Time zone: UTC+12 (New Zealand Standard Time)
  - Summer (DST): UTC+13 (New Zealand Daylight Time)
- Postcode: 9410

Hampden, a small town in North Otago, New Zealand, lies close to the North Otago coast, 35 kilometres south of Oamaru and 80 kilometres north of the city of Dunedin, to both of which it is connected by State Highway 1.

The township's population at its largest was about 560, but by 2009 it had dwindled to approximately 230. Hampden is named in honour of the English politician John Hampden by early surveyor W. B. D. Mantell, possibly influenced by the location of a public house, The Hampden Hotel, at the site.

== Geography ==
Hampden is situated beside a broad bay stretching from Aorere Point to Moeraki Point, on a coastal plain which rises westward to the foothills of the Horse Range and the Kakanui Range. The soil of this surrounding plain overlies a limestone formation. The Moeraki Boulders are located two kilometres south of Hampden. Much of the town lies between the Big Kuri (Kurinui) and Little Kuri Creeks.

The streets of Hampden run in a rectangular grid pattern centred on the main highway and the railway. They are named after English locations, such as Lancaster, Shrewsbury, Worcester, and Norfolk. There is surfing on the Kātiki straight, as well as trout-fishing in the Waianakarua and Shag Rivers.

== History ==
The settlement was founded in the 1860s, with the first sale of land sections dated to March 1863. By 1865, there were two public houses in the area, The Hampden Hotel and The Clyde Hotel, and both a cemetery and mechanics' institute were in place by 1870. Early industry in the area included the harvesting of flax and timber.

A borough was proclaimed in 1879, with the first mayor being William Murcott. The borough existed until the 1960s, and Hampden is now part of the Waitaki District.

== Demographics ==
Hampden is described as a rural settlement by Statistics New Zealand, and covers 2.56 km^{2} (0.99 sq mi). It had an estimated population of 410 as of June 2025, with a population density of 160 people per km^{2}. It is part of the larger Waihemo statistical area.

Historical population
Year	Pop.	±% p.a.
2006	297	—
2013	300	+0.14%
2018	339	+2.47%
2023	396	+3.16%

Hampden had a population of 396 in the 2023 New Zealand census, an increase of 57 people (16.8%) since the 2018 census, and an increase of 96 people (32.0%) since the 2013 census. There were 204 males, 189 females, and 3 people of other genders in 183 dwellings. 2.3% of people identified as LGBTIQ+. The median age was 56.2 years (compared with 38.1 years nationally). There were 48 people (12.1%) aged under 15 years, 33 (8.3%) aged 15 to 29, 189 (47.7%) aged 30 to 64, and 126 (31.8%) aged 65 or older.

People could identify as more than one ethnicity. The results were 90.9% European (Pākehā); 15.9% Māori; 0.8% Pasifika; 3.0% Asian; 0.8% Middle Eastern, Latin American and African New Zealanders (MELAA); and 4.5% other, which includes people giving their ethnicity as "New Zealander". English was spoken by 97.0%, Māori by 1.5%, and other languages by 3.8%. No language could be spoken by 2.3% (e.g. too young to talk). New Zealand Sign Language was known by 0.8%. The percentage of people born overseas was 18.2, compared with 28.8% nationally.

Religious affiliations were 26.5% Christian, 0.8% Hindu, 0.8% Māori religious beliefs, and 1.5% other religions. People who answered that they had no religion were 61.4%, and 9.1% of people did not answer the census question.

Of those at least 15 years old, 45 (12.9%) people had a bachelor's or higher degree, 180 (51.7%) had a post-high school certificate or diploma, and 120 (34.5%) people exclusively held high school qualifications. The median income was $25,600, compared with $41,500 nationally. 15 people (4.3%) earned over $100,000 compared to 12.1% nationally. The employment status of those at least 15 was 120 (34.5%) full-time, 57 (16.4%) part-time, and 3 (0.9%) unemployed.

== Church ==
The Hampden Presbyterian church was built in 1870 and was no longer used for regular services in 2010 due to a declining number of parishioners. The church has seating for almost 200 parishioners. It was designed by the architect RA Lawson in 1869.

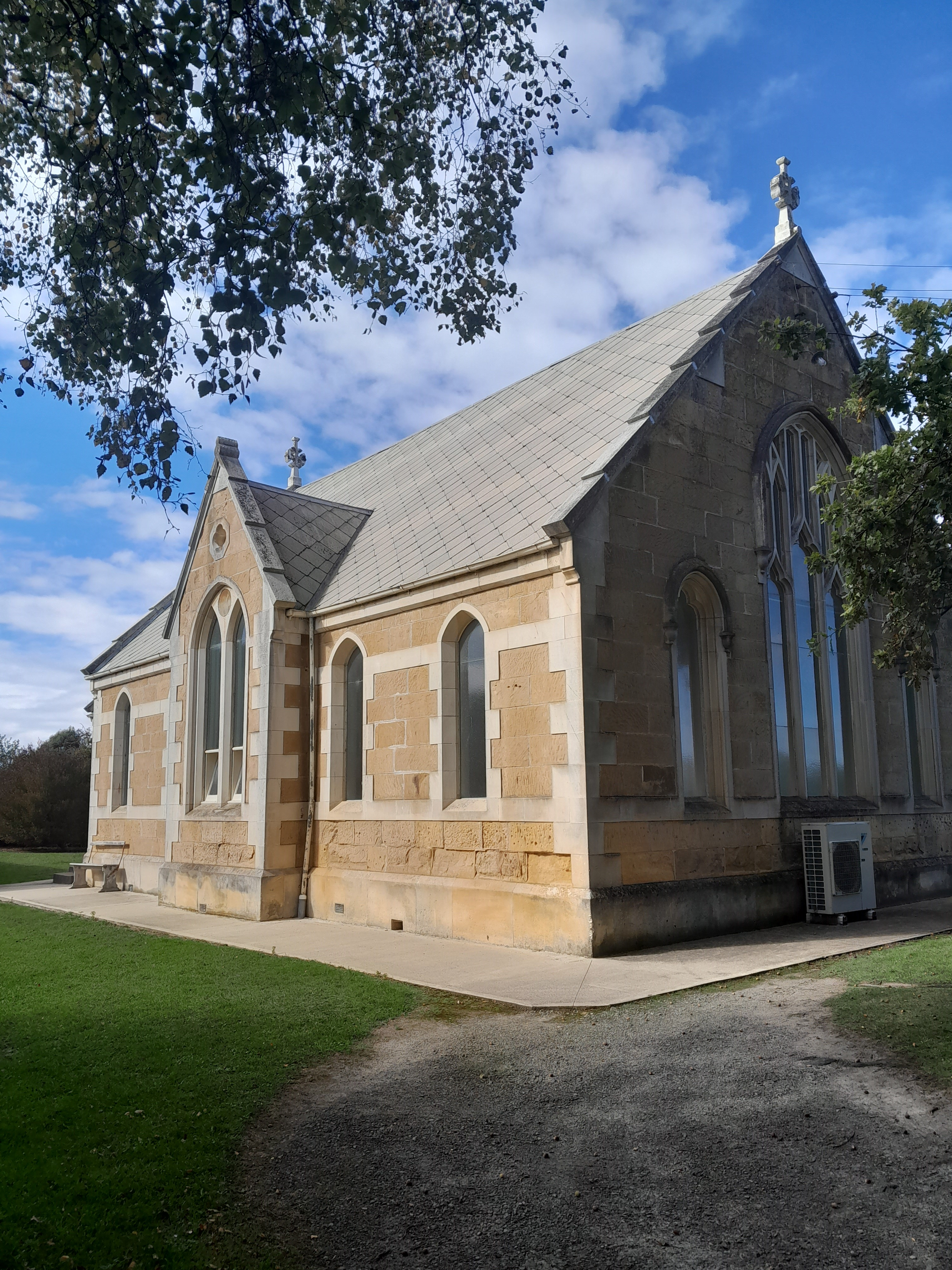
Hampden Presbyterian Church (2023)

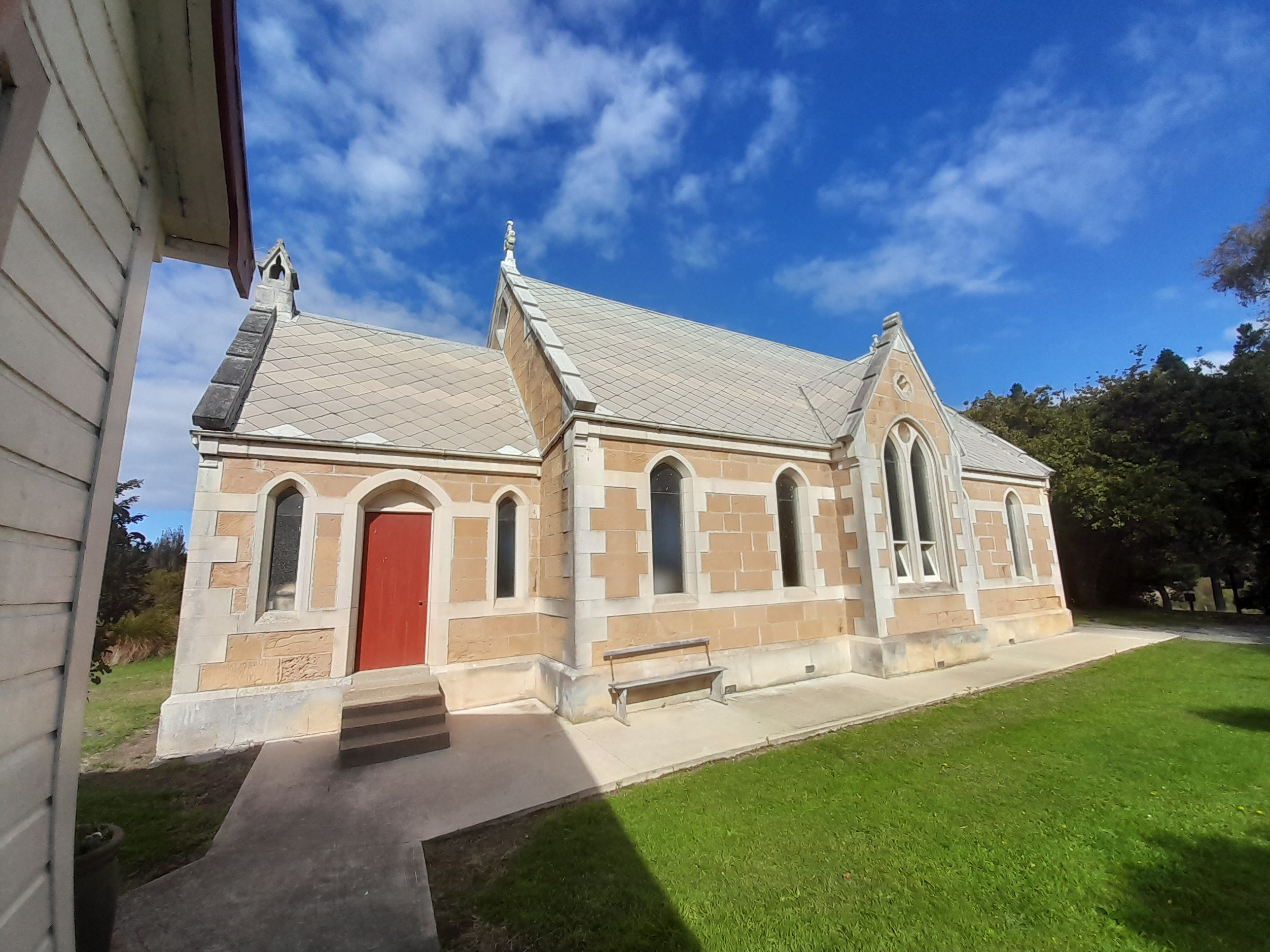
Hampden Presbyterian Church (2023)

== Modern Hampden ==
The town includes a rural fire station, a fish-and-chip shop, a small supermarket, a motel, and backpackers, a popular camping ground, a cafe, mechanics workshop, a small second-hand goods shop, a tavern, and a historic town hall. Sheep farming is the primary economic activity of the region and is augmented by farming of other livestock.

The Hampden Energy Forum, established in 2007, has grown into a community self-help scheme that involves nearly everyone in the settlement, growing from a small group of enthusiasts who were concerned about the future of small rural communities in "post-oil" days. At the inaugural meeting to establish the Forum, more than one third of the town's population attended. The forum won the Trustpower Community Award in 2008.

== Education ==
Hampden School is a full primary school catering for years 1 to 8, with a roll of 34 students as of July 2026. The school opened in 1864.

== Notable people ==
- Helen Stephen Cowie (doctor)
- Louis Barnett (surgeon and resident of Hampden)

== In popular culture ==
The town (and its pub), thinly disguised as "Hamdon", provide the setting for parts of Keri Hulme's 1984 novel The Bone People.
