= Inch Valley =

Coordinates: 45°24′S 170°38′E

Inch Valley is a lightly populated rural locality in the Otago region of New Zealand's South Island. It is northwest of Palmerston and Glenpark, east of Stoneburn, on the banks of the Shag River. Economic activity around Inch Valley is agricultural.

== Transport ==
Inch Valley is between Glenpark and Dunback on State Highway 85.

For 104 years, a branch line railway passed through Inch Valley; for 68 of these years, it served as a railway junction. The Dunback Branch from the Main South Line through Inch Valley to Dunback opened on 29 August 1885, to open up the country and serve farming interests. On 31 March 1900 the short Makareo Branch from Inch Valley northeast to a limeworks in Makareao opened. Passengers in Inch Valley were served solely by mixed trains that ran between Palmerston and Dunback. Due to declining patronage these were cancelled on 10 August 1930 and replaced by goods-only trains. Inch Valley's railway station had a small shelter shed for passengers, a loading bank for freight and a loop for 15 wagons; 100 metres away was a ballast siding.

On 1 January 1968 the Dunback Branch was closed due to substantial financial losses. Local freight was no longer carried; trains ran through Inch Valley without stopping thrice weekly to serve the Makareao limeworks. On 1 June 1989 this line closed. The railway formation is visible around Inch Valley; at the old station site, a set of points and the loading bank are still in place. A 15-span trestle bridge that took the Makareao Branch over the Shag River was destroyed in the mid-1990s as a military training exercise.
