= Croxford =

Croxford is a surname. Notable people with the surname include:

- Guy Croxford (born 1981), Zimbabwean cricketer
- Henry Croxford (1845–1892), English professional cricketer
- Tara Croxford (born 1968), Canadian field hockey player
- William Croxford (1863–1950), New Zealand cricketer
