= Morrisons, New Zealand =

Locality in New Zealand

Coordinates: 45°15.6′S 170°28.8′E

Morrisons is a small township in the Otago Region of New Zealand's South Island. It is located in the Maniototo, on State Highway 85 ("The Pigroot") between Dunback and Ranfurly, some 45 kilometres southwest of Oamaru.

Morrisons lies at the foot of the Horse Range, amongst the headwaters of the Waihemo / Shag River.
