= Puketapu (Otago) =

Hill in Otago, New Zealand

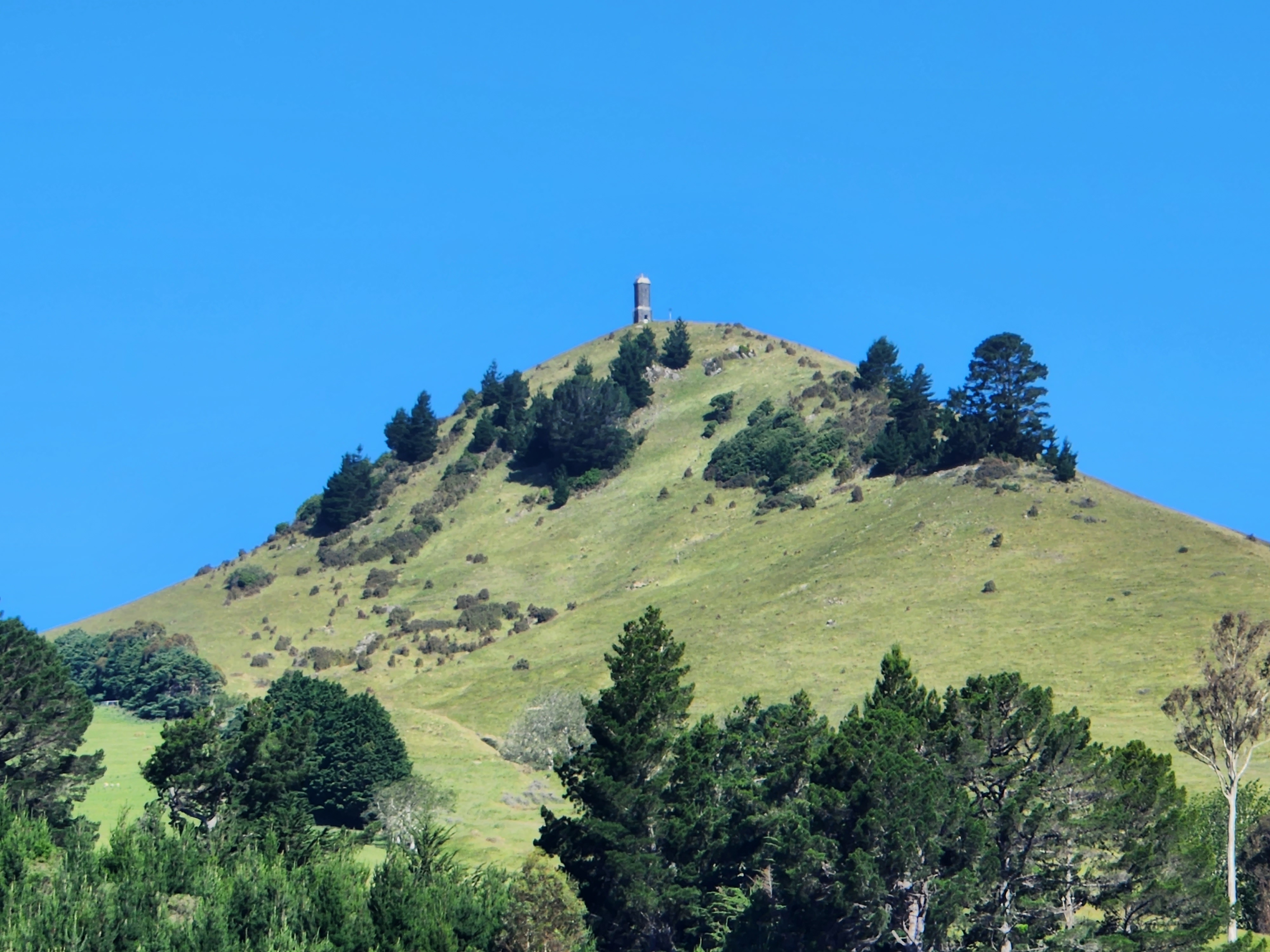

Highest point
- Elevation: 343 m (1,125 ft)
- Prominence: 304 m (997 ft)
- Coordinates: 45°29′26″S 170°43′52″E

Naming
- Etymology: Māori meaning sacred hill

Geography
- Location within New Zealand
- Country: New Zealand
- Region: Otago
- District: Waitaki District

Puketapu is a prominent hill in Otago, in New Zealand's South Island, overlooking the town of Palmerston. The name Puketapu is Māori meaning "sacred hill".

There is a memorial cairn to the 19th century Otago politician Sir John McKenzie. The cairn erected in 1929 by Sir Joseph Ward, replaced an earlier cairn on the nearby hill of Pukehiwitahi, which was erected in 1902, but quickly fell into disrepair.

An annual race held in October each year is run from Palmerston railway station to the summit of Puketapu and back, which is called "Kelly's canter", dedicated to Albert Kelly who ran up Puketapu as a constable in the Palmerston police force every day during World War II to look out for enemy ships.

== Māori mythology ==
There are several versions of the traditional story of the area but they all tell of the arrival of Rākaihautū from the ancestral homeland Hawaiki who met the Kahui Tipua people who were already here. He showed them kūmara, or sweet potatoes, and they built waka (canoes) including Ārai Te Uru to go to Hawaiki and bring back this new and valuable food. However, on its return the vessel became waterlogged off the Waitaki River mouth, spilled food baskets on Moeraki and Katiki beaches and was wrecked at Shag Point / Matakaea, where it turned into what is now called Danger Reef. A prominent point in the reef is said to be the steersman, Hipo, sitting erect at the stern. After this the crew explored the southern South Island, naming many place. Kahui Tipua are 'ghost or giant people' with mythic or magical attributes, although they are also the real ancestors of people living now. If the explorers didn't get back before dawn they turned into hills and other natural features. One of them was a woman Puketapu who went as far south as Owaka in The Catlins. When she got back to the Waihemo Valley dawn broke and she was turned into the hill overlooking Palmerston.

The story is seen as an allegorical explanation of the fact that kumara won't grow south of Banks Peninsula. Arai Te Uru is an ancestral canoe of the Kāti Māmoe iwi who came to the south before Kāi Tahu (Ngāi Tahu in modern standard Māori) but were preceded by earlier peoples. The Ārai Te Uru tradition reflects this with its reference to the preceding Kahui Tipua. It is tempting to identify the occupants of an archaeological site close to the mouth of the Waihemo / Shag River with the people of Ārai Te Uru but that can only be speculation.
