= Allan Parkhill =

- Born: Allan Archibald Parkhill; 22 April 1912 Palmerston, New Zealand
- Died: 26 August 1986 (aged 74) Dunedin, New Zealand
- Height: 1.80 m (5 ft 11 in)
- Weight: 90 kg (200 lb)
- School: Palmerston District High School
- Occupation: Butcher

Rugby union career
- Position: Number 8
Provincial / State sides
Years	Team	Apps	(Points)
1934–41	Otago		
1943	Canterbury		
International career
Years	Team	Apps	(Points)
1937–38	New Zealand	6	(3)

Allan Archibald Parkhill (22 April 1912 – 26 August 1986) was a New Zealand rugby union player. A number eight, Parkhill represented Otago and Canterbury at a provincial level, and was a member of the New Zealand national side, the All Blacks, in 1937 and 1938. He played 10 matches for the All Blacks including six internationals, scoring three tries in all.

Parkhill died in Dunedin on 26 August 1986, and his ashes were buried at Andersons Bay Cemetery.
