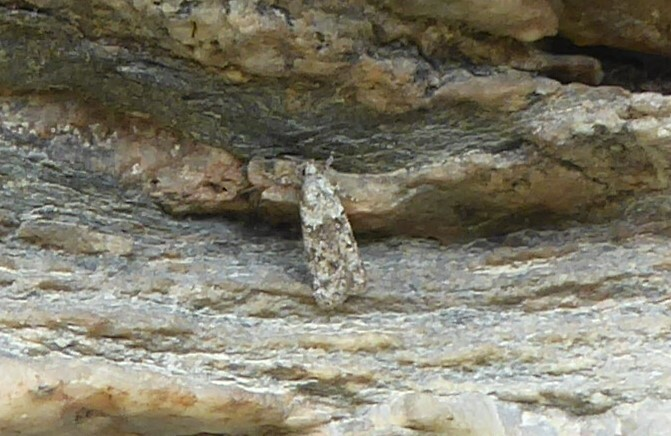
- Izatha gekkonella on a rock face in Macraes, Otago Region

Scientific classification
- Kingdom: Animalia
- Phylum: Arthropoda
- Class: Insecta
- Order: Lepidoptera
- Family: Oecophoridae
- Genus: Izatha
- Species: I. gekkonella

Binomial name
- Izatha gekkonella Hoare, 2010

= Izatha gekkonella =

Species of moth

Izatha gekkonella is a moth of the family Oecophoridae. It is endemic to New Zealand, where it is only known from the region of the Taieri and Shag River catchments in eastern Otago.

== Description ==
The wingspan is 13.5–15.5 mm for males and 13.5–17 mm for females. This species is very similar in appearance to I. convulsella but is slightly smaller and has a more brownish appearance.

== Behaviour ==
Adults have been recorded in October, November and December.

Larvae have been recorded feeding on lichens on rock-faces, making a silken web amongst the lichens.
