= Stoneburn =

Locality in New Zealand's South Island

Coordinates: 45°26′S 170°34′E

Stoneburn is a lightly populated rural locality in the Otago region of New Zealand's South Island. It is situated west of Glenpark and Inch Valley. The nearest significantly sized town is Palmerston, southeast of Stoneburn.
