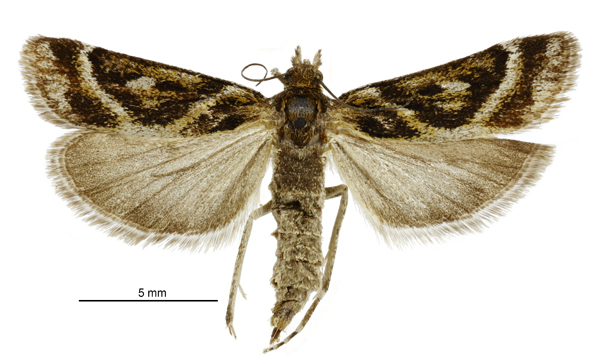
- Female
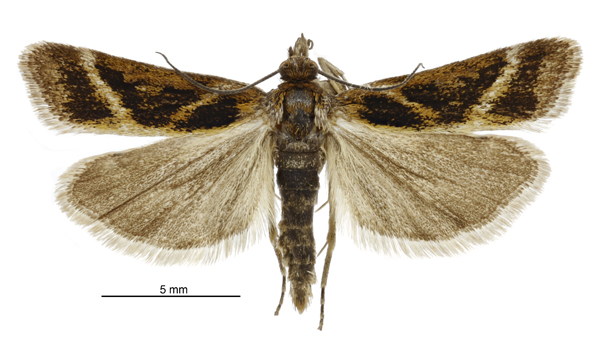
- Male

Scientific classification
- Kingdom: Animalia
- Phylum: Arthropoda
- Class: Insecta
- Order: Lepidoptera
- Family: Crambidae
- Genus: Eudonia
- Species: E. xysmatias

Binomial name
- Eudonia xysmatias (Meyrick, 1907)

Synonyms
- Scoparia xysmatias Meyrick, 1907

= Eudonia xysmatias =

Species of moth, endemic to New Zealand

Eudonia xysmatias is a moth in the family Crambidae. It was first described by Edward Meyrick in 1907. This species is endemic to New Zealand and has been observed and collected in Otago. This species inhabits wetlands. Adults are day flying and are on the wing in December and January.

== Taxonomy ==
This species was first described by Edward Meyrick and named Scoparia xysmatias. In 1928 George Hudson described and illustrated this species under that name. In 1988 John S. Dugdale placed this species in the genus Eudonia. The male holotype, collected by J. H. Lewis in the Old Man Range / Kopuwai in Central Otago, is held at the Natural History Museum, London.

== Description ==
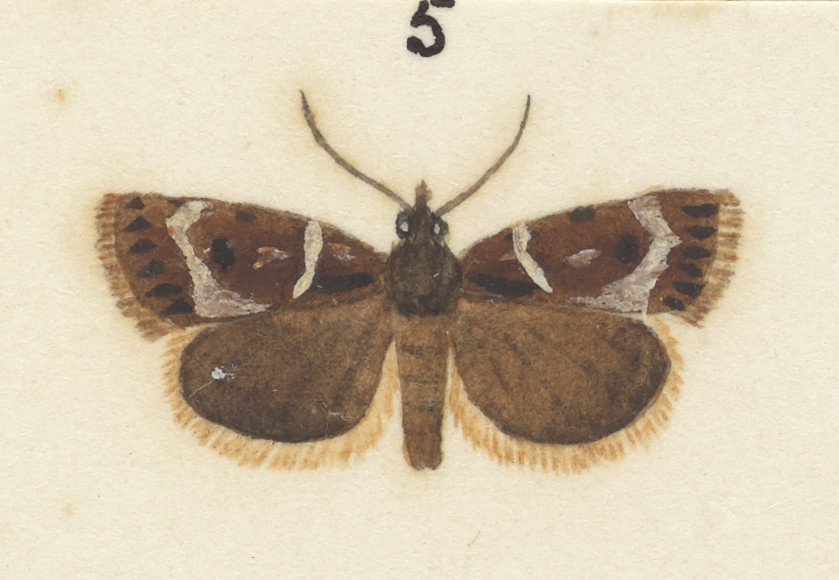
Illustration by George Hudson.

Meyrick described this species as follows:

♂. 19 mm. Head dark fuscous. Palpi 1 1/2, dark fuscous, lower longitudinal half ochreous-whitish. Antennae very minutely pubescent. Thorax dark fuscous, sprinkled with ferruginous scales. Forewings elongate, gradually dilated, costa almost straight, apex obtuse, termen faintly sinuate, rather oblique; dark fuscous, irregularly strewn except on margins with yellowish-ferruginous scales, and partially suffused with black, especially about margins of first and second lines and towards dorsum anteriorly; first and second lines represented by straight undefined series of whitish scales surrounded with yellowish-ferriiginous suffusion, strongly converging towards dorsum; a small spot of white scales in middle of disc, followed by a black spot; a well-marked black fascia beyond second line; a few white scales indicating subterminal line : cilia ochreous-whitish, with dark-fuscous basal and grey median lines. Hindwings without hairs in cell; dark grey sprinkled with blackish; cilia ochreous-whitish, with dark-grey basal line.

== Distribution ==
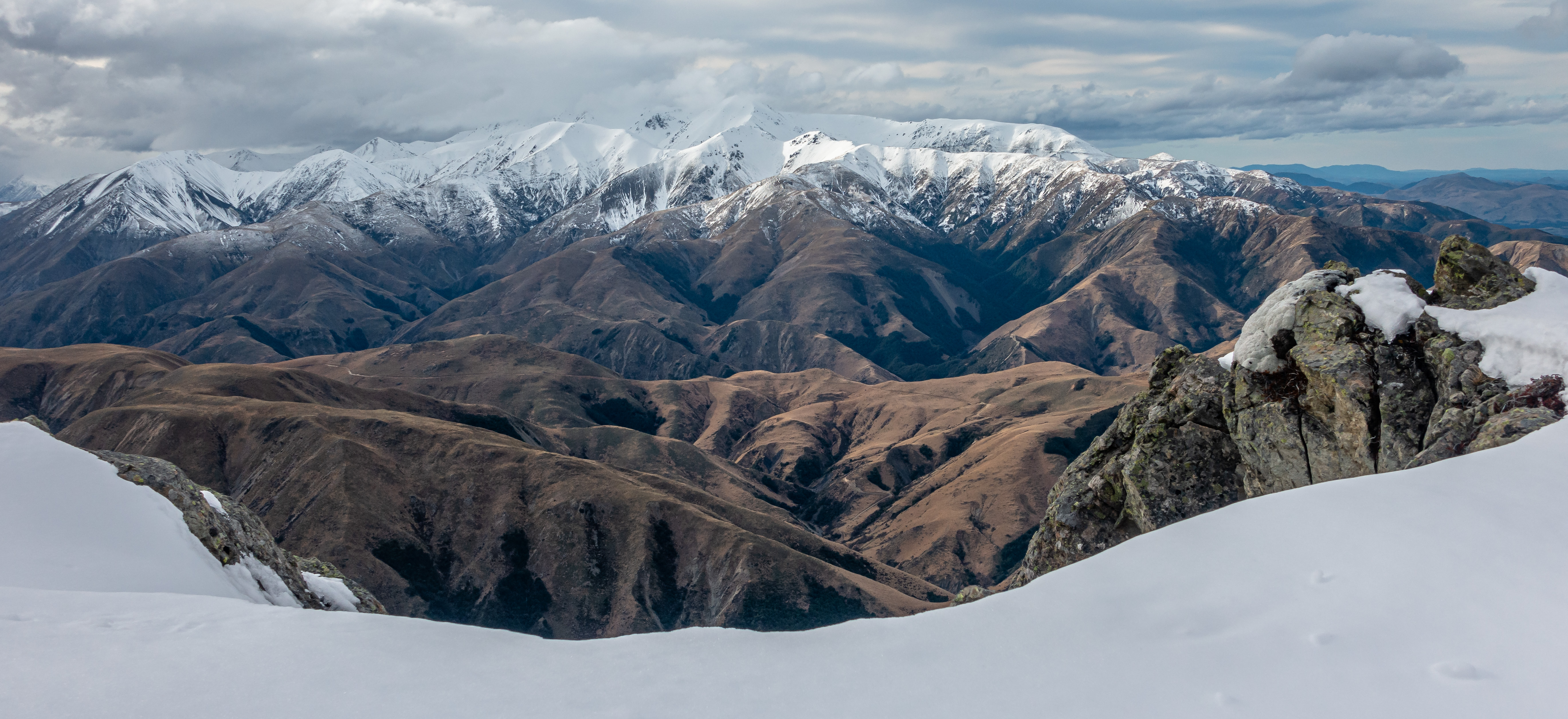
Old Man Range, type locality.

This species is endemic to New Zealand. This species has been observed or collected in Otago at the type locality of Old Man Range as well as at Bold Peak at the head of Lake Wakatipu, in the Kakanui Mountains and at Happy Valley.

== Habitat ==
This moth inhabits various wetlands.

== Behaviour ==
E. xysmatias is a day flying moth. Adults are on the wing in December and January.
