= International cricket in 1946 =

International cricket season

The 1946 International cricket season was from April 1946 to August 1946.

== Season overview ==
International tours
Start date	Home team	Away team	Results [Matches]			
Start date	Home team	Away team	Test	ODI	FC	LA
10 June 1946	England	India	1–0 [3]	—	—	—
12 June 1946	England	England Rest	—	—	1–0 [2]	—
13 July 1946	Scotland	Ireland	—	—	0–1 [3]	—
1 August 1946	Netherlands	England	—	—	0–0 [3]	—

== June ==
=== Test Trial in England ===
Unofficial Test series
No.	Date	Home captain	Away captain	Venue	Result
Match 1	12–14 June	Wally Hammond	Bryan Valentine	Lord's, London	Match drawn
Match 2	10–12 July	Norman Yardley	Denis Compton	St Lawrence Ground, Canterbury	England by 18 runs

=== India in England ===
Test series
No.	Date	Home captain	Away captain	Venue	Result
Test 276	22–25 June	Wally Hammond	Iftikhar Ali Khan Pataudi	Lord's, London	England by 10 wickets
Test 277	20–23 July	Wally Hammond	Iftikhar Ali Khan Pataudi	Old Trafford Cricket Ground, Manchester	Match drawn
Test 278	17–20 August	Wally Hammond	Iftikhar Ali Khan Pataudi	Kennington Oval, London	Match drawn

== July ==
=== Ireland in Scotland ===
First-class Match
No.	Date	Home captain	Away captain	Venue	Result
Match	24–27 July	W Clark	Donald Shearer	Glenpark, Greenock	Ireland by 8 wickets

== August ==
=== England in Netherlands ===
Three-day match series
No.	Date	Home captain	Away captain	Venue	Result
Match 1	1–2 August	Not mentioned	Not mentioned	Haarlem	Match drawn
Match 2	3–4 August	Not mentioned	Not mentioned	De Diepput, The Hague	Match drawn
One-day match
No.	Date	Home captain	Away captain	Venue	Result
Match	6 August	EJA Schill	Arthur Brodhurst	Wassenaar	Match drawn
