= James Croxford =

New Zealand cricketer (1863–1950)

Personal information
- Full name: William Robert James Croxford
- Born: 4 September 1863; Clerkenwell, London, England
- Died: 30 June 1950 (aged 86); Inch Valley, Otago, New Zealand
- Role: Wicket-keeper

Domestic team information
- Years: Team
- 1890/91–1893/94: Otago
- Source: ESPNcricinfo, 8 May 2016

William Robert James Croxford (4 September 1863 – 30 June 1950) was a New Zealand cricketer. He played six first-class matches for Otago between the 1890–91 and 1893–94 seasons.

Croxford was born at Clerkenwell in London in 1863 and emigrated to New Zealand with his family in 1874. His family settled in Opoho in Otago, his father establishing a plumbing and hardware supplies business.

Playing club cricket for North Dunedin and then Albion Cricket Clubs in Dunedin, Croxford made his first-class debut against Canterbury in January 1891 as Otago's wicket-keeper. After playing in all four of the province's first-class matches during the 1892–93 season, he made his final appearance for the representative team the following season. In total he scored 118 runs, took seven catches and made five stumpings.

As well as cricket, he played rugby union for Otago in 1888 and stood as an umpire in first-class cricket. Despite "several offers" to play as a professional in both sports, he worked as a lithographer for a variety of firms in Dunedin. He died at Inch Valley in Otago in 1950 aged 86.
