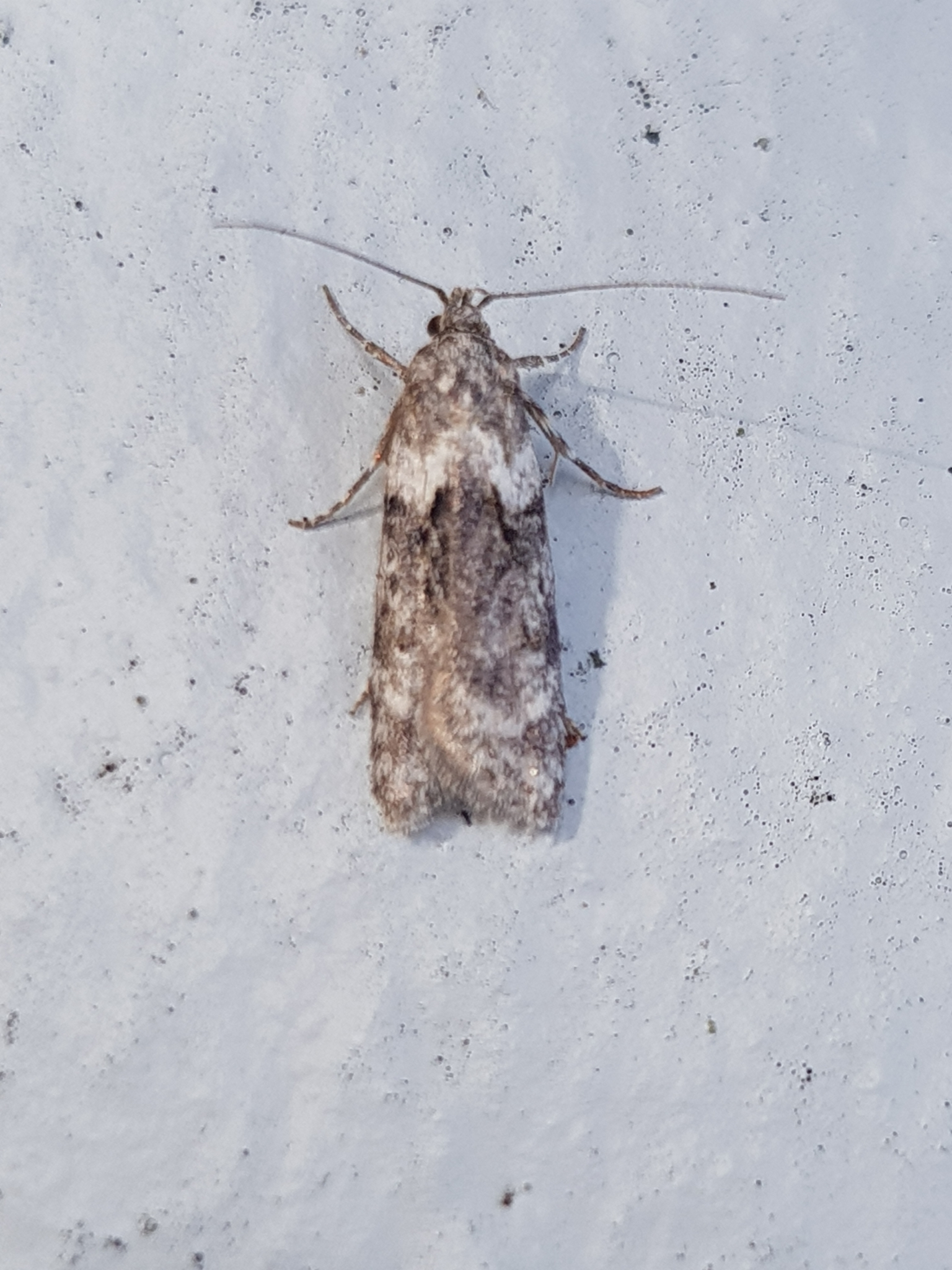

Scientific classification
- Kingdom: Animalia
- Phylum: Arthropoda
- Class: Insecta
- Order: Lepidoptera
- Family: Oecophoridae
- Genus: Izatha
- Species: I. convulsella

Binomial name
- Izatha convulsella (Walker, 1864)

Synonyms
- Gelechia convulsella Walker, 1864; Semiocosma paraneura Meyrick, 1892

= Izatha convulsella =

Species of moth endemic to New Zealand

Izatha convulsella is a moth of the family Oecophoridae. It was first described by Francis Walker in 1864. It is endemic to New Zealand and is found on the eastern side of the South Island as well as in locations such as Wellington, Ōtaki, Palmerston North, Taihape and Waipawa in the North Island.This species is similar in appearance to its close relative Izatha gekkonella but is slightly larger and more white/grey in appearance and is more wide spread in geographic range than its close relative. Larvae have been fond under the bark of Rimu trees but it has been hypothesised that they feed on lichens growing on the bark. Adults are on the wing from late September until February.

== Taxonomy ==
This species was first described by Francis Walker in 1864 under the name Gelechia convulsella. Walker based his description on specimens collected in Nelson by Mr Oxley. In 1892 Edward Meyrick, thinking he was describing a new species, named this species Semiocosma paraneura. Meyrick synonymised this name in 1915 and placed this species in the genus Izatha. George Hudson discussed and illustrated this species under the name Izatha convulsella in his 1928 publication The butterflies and moths of New Zealand. The female holotype, collected in Nelson, is held at the Natural History Museum, London.

== Description ==
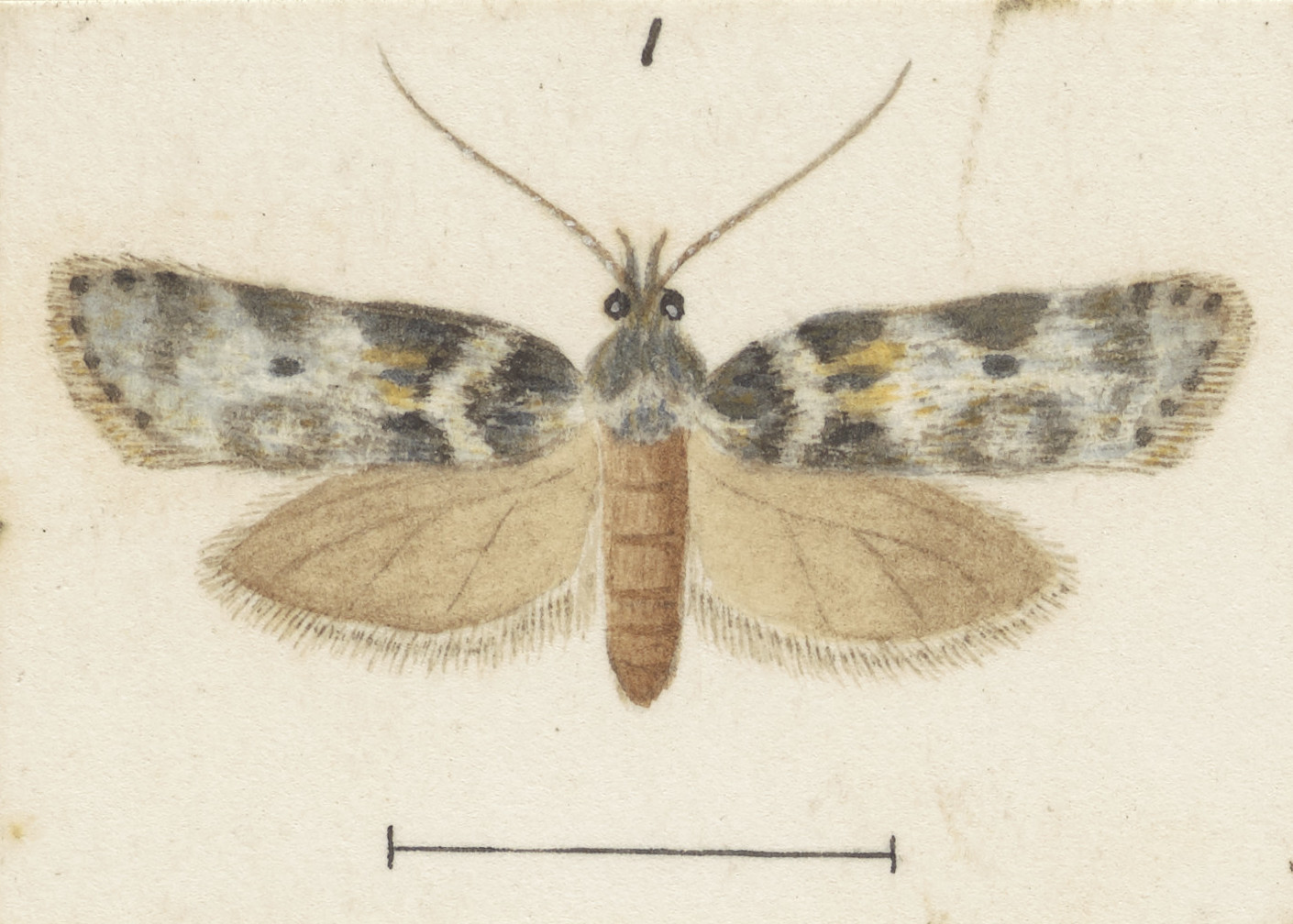
Illustration of female I. convulsella by George Hudson.

The wingspan is 14–20 mm for males and 13.5–19 mm for females.

Hudson described the larva of this species as follows:

The larva, which lives under the scales of the bark of Rimu trees (Dacrydium cupressinum), is about 1/2 inch in length, stout with a horny dark brown head and two horny plates on the second segment. The rest of the body is dull yellowish-brown with six rows of horny warts each emitting a long bristle.

Hudson described the adult of this species as follows:

The expansion of the wings is about 1/2 inch. The fore-wings are rather narrow with the termen oblique, dull bluish-grey irregularly speckled with black and with white markings; there is a dark basal patch; a rather broad, curved, white band from the costa at about 1/4; a very indefinite darker central band; an indistinct whitish line from 2/3 of the costa to the tornus; there are three or four small black marks in the disc before the middle; a black spot beyond the middle and a much fainter spot before the apex; a series of marginal dots extend from the costa at about 3/4 to the tornus. The hind-wings are greyish-ochreous, darker towards the apex and termen.

This species is very similar in appearance to its close relation I. gekkonella. The most accurate way to confirm the identity of specimens is by dissection of the male genitalia as I. convulsella has a comb like structure in the reproductive organ of the males of the species. Generally I. convulsella is slightly larger than I. gekkonella and has fewer yellow-tipped grey scales and so has a more white and grey appearance in comparison to the I. gokkonella which, as a result of having a larger quantity of these scales, has a more brownish appearance. I. convulsella also has lighter coloured hindwings in comparison to I. gekkonella.

== Distribution ==
This species is endemic to New Zealand. It is widespread in the eastern part of the South Island. In the North Island, it has only been recorded from Wellington, Ōtaki, Palmerston North, Taihape and Waipawa. This species is not found in Auckland.

== Behaviour ==
Adults are on wing from late September to February.

== Host species ==
Larvae have been recorded living under the bark of Dacrydium cupressinum. The true food plant may be lichens growing on the bark.
