= Dunback and Makareao Branches =

Overview
- Other name(s): Waihemo Branch; Inch Valley Railway
- Status: Closed
- Owner: Railways Department
- Locale: Otago, New Zealand
- Termini: Palmerston; Dunback / Makareao
- Stations: 4 / 1

Service
- Type: Heavy Rail
- System: New Zealand Government Railways (NZGR)
- Services: 2
- Operator: Railways Department

History
- Commenced: March 1880
- Opened: 29 August 1885
- Makareao Branch Opened: 31 March 1900
- Inch Valley - Dunback Closed: 1 January 1968
- Closed: 1 June 1989

Technical
- Line length: 10.17 km (6.32 mi)
- Number of tracks: Single
- Character: Rural
- Track gauge: 3 ft 6 in (1,067 mm)

Map

The Dunback and Makareao Branches were two connected branch line railways, part of New Zealand's national rail network. Located in the Otago region of the South Island, both lines were 15 kilometres (9.3 mi) in length and shared the first 11 kilometres (6.8 mi). The Dunback Branch, also known as the Waihemo Branch, opened in 1885 and closed in 1968; the Makareao Branch, also known as the Inch Valley Railway or the Inch Valley Branch, opened in 1900 and operated for 89 years to 1989.

== Construction ==
The first few kilometres of the Dunback Branch were under construction by March 1880 to access a deposit of shingle for use on railway construction and maintenance elsewhere and in operation by 1882. This spur left the Main South Line just north of Palmerston with its points facing south towards Palmerston station. These initial kilometres were built with a further extension in mind, and by 1884 work on completing the line to Dunback was under way. The branch followed the Shag River, and on 29 August 1885 it was formally opened. An extension of this line to Ranfurly and beyond was proposed as a possible route for a railway to Central Otago, but the route of the Otago Central Railway ultimately reached Ranfurly by passing through the Taieri and Maniototo regions.

The Makareao Branch followed approximately 15 years later, with the four kilometres (2.5 mi) of track constructed by the Public Works Department and opened on 31 March 1900. Its ownership passed through a series of government departments before ultimately coming under the control of New Zealand Railways. This line was built through a rural district, serving no towns or localities; it was built solely to access a lime works and had a steep climb from its junction with the Dunback Branch at Inch Valley to the terminus in Makareao.

== Stations ==
The following stations were on the Dunback and Makareao Branches (in brackets is the distance from Palmerston):

- Meadowbank (4.38 kilometres [2.72 mi]) - loop for 14 wagons, name sometimes spelt "Meadow Bank".
- Glenpark (7.23 kilometres [4.49 mi]) - loop for 31 wagons, goods shed, passenger platform, and loading bank.
- Inch Valley (10.17 kilometres [6.32 mi]) - loop for 15 wagons, passenger platform and shelter shed, and loading bank.

The line then split and had two termini:

- Dunback (14.8 kilometres [9.2 mi]) - multiple loops, goods shed, water tank for steam locomotives, passenger platform, loading bank.
- Makareao (15.06 kilometres [9.36 mi]) - lime bins and loop for 26 wagons.

Dunback was the only station that was staffed. 100 metres (330 ft) before Inch Valley, a short siding ran to a ballast pit and had a 39-wagon loop. The points faced towards Dunback.

== Operation ==
The Dunback Branch was the nearest railhead to the Maniototo region at its opening in 1885 and initially catered for traffic from beyond just the local Dunback area. This included providing supplies for the construction of the Otago Central Railway. When the Otago Central was opened to Ranfurly in 1898, the Dunback Branch was deprived of its wider importance, and it was relegated to catering for solely local traffic.

The 1900 opening of the Makareao Branch significantly added to traffic on the line, with large quantities of limestone transported by rail. This industrial traffic sustained the line, allowing the branch to largely avoid the slow decline that plagued many rural branch lines in New Zealand in the 20th century. By the late 1920s, the short section from Inch Valley to Dunback was losing money and passenger services ceased on 10 August 1930. These services had been solely mixed trains, where a passenger carriage (or more if necessary) was attached to a goods train.

In 1950, five trains operated a week, and with non-limestone traffic dwindling it was inevitable that the Dunback section would be closed and services concentrated on Makareao. Closure of the four kilometres (2.5 mi) from Inch Valley to Dunback took place on 1 January 1968 and limestone became the line's sole traffic with the line being dieselised in April 1968. Services operated thrice weekly to Dunedin's Burnside Cement Works, with the trains of four-wheeled wagons, typically hauled by DJ class locomotives, nicknamed "stone trains". From at least 1952 trains were limited to 30 kilometres per hour (19 mph) for the entire line, and in 1988 this dropped to 20 kilometres per hour (12 mph). During these later years occasional passenger excursions were operated down the line by railway enthusiasts and organisations, notably the Otago Excursion Train Trust.

The end of the Makareao Branch was sudden. Declining demand led to the closure of the Burnside Cement Works in December 1988, removing the limestone traffic that was the line's livelihood. It was kept open for a few months due to hopes that the cement works would be reopened, but this did not come to pass and formal closure came on 1 June 1989, though stone trains had not run since the cement works' closure the previous December.

== Today ==
Many remnants are still quite visible, due to the line's relatively recent closure. Bridges, abutments, culverts and the formation are very visible for the entire length of the route, some railway gates and mile/kilometre pegs are still in place, and even a few rails remain. Meadowbanks still has its stockyard, and there are loading banks at Dunback. In Makareao, Taylor's Lime continue to operate the works for agricultural production, and substantial railway remnants exist. There are no bridges remaining beyond Inch Valley; the 15-span trestle bridge crossing the Shag River on the Makareao Branch was demolished in the mid 1990s.
