= Tahu Potiki =

New Zealand Māori chief executive (1966–2019)

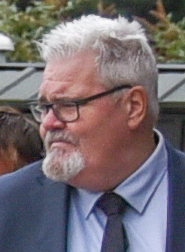
- Potiki in April 2019
- Born: 23 December 1966; Palmerston, New Zealand
- Died: 27 August 2019 (aged 52); Auckland, New Zealand
- Occupation: Māori leader
- Known for: Chief executive of Te Rūnanga o Ngāi Tahu from 2002 to 2006

Tahu Potiki (23 December 1966 – 27 August 2019) was a New Zealand Māori leader who served as chief executive of Te Rūnanga o Ngāi Tahu from 2002 to 2006.

== Biography ==
Potiki was born in Palmerston to Les and Rona Potiki, and grew up in Karitane, becoming an authority on the history of his iwi, Ngāi Tahu. Potiki had been kaiarahi at the Christchurch Polytechnic Institute of Technology, which became the Ara Institute of Canterbury, and board chair of Ngāi Tahu Development Corporation. He also sat on the Canterbury and West Coast health boards. He died in Auckland on 27 August 2019, aged 52, having been diagnosed with end-stage liver disease in 2014, and receiving a liver transplant in 2017.

On 14 May 2021, asteroid 101462 Tahupotiki, discovered by astronomer Ian P. Griffin at the Astronaut Memorial Planetarium and Observatory in 1998, was named in Potiki's memory by the Working Group for Small Bodies Nomenclature.
