= Arthur Gilligan (footballer) =

Personal information
- Full name: Arthur Edward Gilligan
- Born: 18 October 1879; Palmerston, New Zealand
- Died: 9 July 1963 (aged 83); Yan Yean, Victoria
- Position: Full forward

Playing career^{1}
Years	Club	Games (Goals)
1902	Fitzroy	3 (4)
1903–1905	Essendon	29 (11)
Total		32 (15)
- ^{1} Playing statistics correct to the end of 1905.

Arthur Edward Gilligan (18 October 1879 – 9 July 1963) was an Australian rules footballer who played for the Fitzroy Football Club and Essendon Football Club in the Victorian Football League (VFL).
