= Meanings of minor-planet names: 101001–102000 =

As minor planet discoveries are confirmed, they are given a permanent number by the IAU's Minor Planet Center (MPC), and the discoverers can then submit names for them, following the IAU's naming conventions. The list below concerns those minor planets in the specified number-range that have received names, and explains the meanings of those names.

Official naming citations of newly named small Solar System bodies are approved and published in a bulletin by IAU's Working Group for Small Bodies Nomenclature (WGSBN). Before May 2021, citations were published in MPC's Minor Planet Circulars for many decades. Recent citations can also be found on the JPL Small-Body Database (SBDB). Until his death in 2016, German astronomer Lutz D. Schmadel compiled these citations into the Dictionary of Minor Planet Names (DMP) and regularly updated the collection.

Based on Paul Herget's The Names of the Minor Planets, Schmadel also researched the unclear origin of numerous asteroids, most of which had been named prior to World War II. This article incorporates text from this source, which is in the public domain: SBDB New namings may only be added to this list below after official publication as the preannouncement of names is condemned. The WGSBN publishes a comprehensive guideline for the naming rules of non-cometary small Solar System bodies.

== 101001–101100 ==
Named minor planet	Provisional	This minor planet was named for...	Ref · Catalog
There are no named minor planets in this number range

== 101101–101200 ==
back to top

Named minor planet	Provisional	This minor planet was named for...	Ref · Catalog
101101 Carmichael	1998 RO_{41}	Robert Daniel Carmichael (1879–1967), an American mathematician.	IAU · 101101

== 101201–101300 ==
back to top

Named minor planet	Provisional	This minor planet was named for...	Ref · Catalog
There are no named minor planets in this number range

== 101301–101400 ==
back to top

Named minor planet	Provisional	This minor planet was named for...	Ref · Catalog
101331 Sjöström	1998 SA_{164}	Victor Sjöström (1879–1960), the father of Swedish film and one of the masters of world cinema, was a screen actor and film director.	JPL · 101331
101383 Karloff	1998 UK_{23}	Boris Karloff (1887–1969), an English actor who attained cultural icon status for his portrayal of the monster in the 1931 motion picture "Frankenstein". Karloff, who also appeared in more than 150 films and television programs, has two stars on the Hollywood Walk of Fame.	JPL · 101383

== 101401–101500 ==
back to top

Named minor planet	Provisional	This minor planet was named for...	Ref · Catalog
101432 Adamwest	1998 VG_{33}	Adam West (1928–2017), an American actor best known for his portrayal of the title character in the television series "Batman", which ran from 1966 to 1968. West appeared in more than 40 motion pictures and nearly 100 television programs. He also was a popular voice actor.	JPL · 101432
101461 Dunedin	1998 WU_{7}	Dunedin is a city in New Zealand. Adopted home to the discoverer of this asteroid, the city, known as the "Edinburgh of the south" has been the jumping off point for many Antarctic journeys of discovery.	JPL · 101461
101462 Tahupotiki	1998 WW_{7}	Tahu Potiki (1966–2019) was an important New Zealand Maori leader. He served as chief executive of Te Runanga o Ngai Tahu between 2002 and 2006. Born in Palmerston, he grew up in Karitane. In addition to his immense contributions to the community he was also a noted authority on the history of his iwi, Ngai Tahu.	IAU · 101462
101491 Grahamcrombie	1998 XA	Graham William Crombie (1963–2019) was a New Zealand-born chartered accountant. As Chairman of the Otago Museum Trust Board between 2011 and 2019, he championed the construction of the world's southernmost planetarium, which opened in December 2015.	JPL · 101491
101493 Sergiofoparri	1998 XB_{3}	Sergio Forti Parri (born 1969), son of the discoverer.	JPL · 101493

== 101501–101600 ==
back to top

Named minor planet	Provisional	This minor planet was named for...	Ref · Catalog
101534 Carlobenna	1998 YC_{10}	Carlo Benna, Italian solar astronomer and researcher at the Osservatorio Astrofisico di Torino (OATo).	IAU · 101534

== 101601–101700 ==
back to top

Named minor planet	Provisional	This minor planet was named for...	Ref · Catalog
There are no named minor planets in this number range

== 101701–101800 ==
back to top

Named minor planet	Provisional	This minor planet was named for...	Ref · Catalog
101713 Marston	1999 DG_{4}	William Moulton Marston (1893–1947) was an American psychologist, author, inventor, and creator of the comic book characterWonderWoman, who first appeared in "All Star Comics" number 8 in December 1941. Marston also invented the systolic blood pressure test, a component of the modern polygraph.	JPL · 101713
101721 Emanuelfritsch	1999 EF_{3}	Emanuel Fritsch (1874–1956), Czech railway engineer from Prague who was a regional representative of the Czech Tourist Club	JPL · 101721
101722 Pursell	1999 EX_{4}	Wallace Pursell (born 1929), American co-founder of the Baton Rouge Astronomical Society and a lifelong amateur astronomer.	JPL · 101722
101723 Finger	1999 EY_{5}	Bill Finger (1914–1974) was a comic book writer who created the major characters Batman (with Bob Kane) and Green Lantern (with Martin Nodell). He also created Robin, Catwoman, the Joker and the Penguin. He has been inducted into the Jack Kirby Hall of Fame and the Will Eisner Comic Book Hall of Fame.	JPL · 101723
101777 Robhoskins	1999 GF_{4}	Robert Edward Hoskins (1965–2016) was a recognized and lauded American attorney who specialized in protecting the rights of retired workers, and successfully argued before the United States Supreme Court (Src)	JPL · 101777
101781 Gojira	1999 GU_{9}	Godzilla, known in Japanese as "Gojira", debuted in the Japanese motion picture "Gojira" on 3 November 1954. It was directed by Ishiro Honda. Gojira is a kaiju (fantastic creature) that has appeared in more than 30 movies. The character, now a pop-culture icon, may be the most recognizable fantasy creature ever.	JPL · 101781

== 101801–101900 ==
back to top

Named minor planet	Provisional	This minor planet was named for...	Ref · Catalog
101810 Beiyou	1999 JA_{6}	The Beijing University of Posts and Telecommunications, Beiyou, is a key multidisciplinary research university of China, with programs in engineering, management, humanities and sciences, and information technology.	JPL · 101810
101811 Jakobkaup	1999 JQ_{6}	Johann Jakob Kaup (1803–1873), German paleontologist and zoologist.	JPL · 101811
101813 Elizabethmarston	1999 JX_{7}	Elizabeth Holloway Marston (1893–1993) was an American attorney and psychologist. She developed, with her husband William Moulton Marston, the systolic blood-pressure test. Along with her husband's live-in mistress, Olive Byrne, she was the inspiration for the comic book creation Wonder Woman.	JPL · 101813

== 101901–102000 ==
back to top

Named minor planet	Provisional	This minor planet was named for...	Ref · Catalog
101902 Gisellaluccone	1999 RN	Gisella Luccone (born 1974), friend of Italian astronomer Gianluca Masi who discovered this minor planet	JPL · 101902
101955 Bennu	1999 RQ_{36}	Bennu, an ancient deity from Egyptian mythology. Bennu is associated with Osiris, Atum and Ra.	JPL · 101955
101960 Molau	1999 RR_{38}	Sirko Molau (born 1971), a German computer scientist and amateur astronomer who developed software for the real-time detection of meteors on a video stream (Src and Src)	JPL · 101960
101961 Augustklipstein	1999 RL_{39}	August Wilhelm von Klipstein (1801–1894), German geologist and paleontologist.	JPL · 101961

back to top

Preceded by 100,001–101,000	Meanings of minor-planet names List of minor planets: 101,001–102,000	Succeeded by 102,001–103,000
