= Becks, New Zealand =

Small settlement in the Otago Region of the South Island of New Zealand

Coordinates: 45°00′S 169°44.5′E

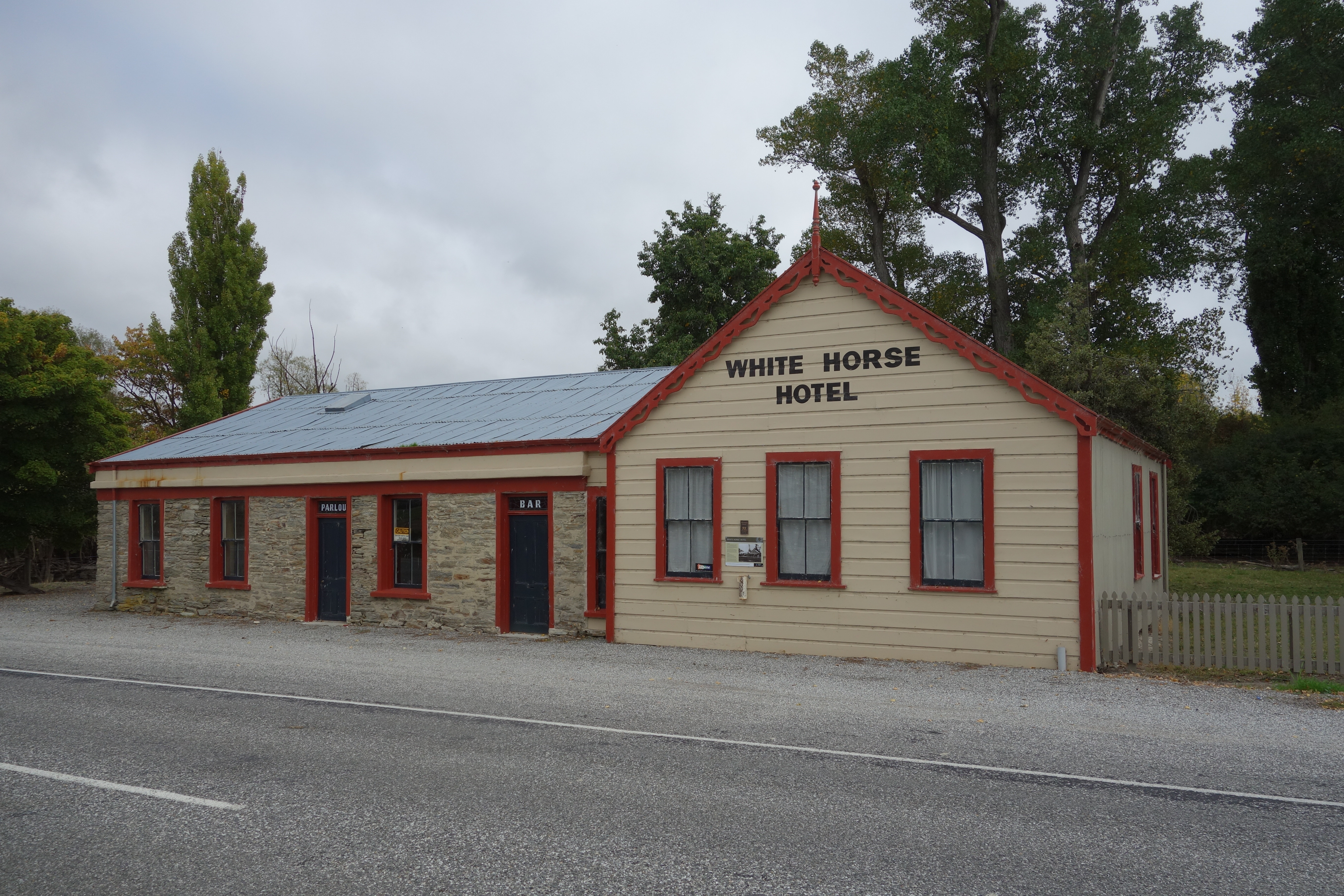
The former White Horse Hotel in Becks

Becks is a small settlement in the Otago Region of the South Island of New Zealand. It is located on State Highway 85, some 16 kilometres (9.9 mi) north-east of Omakau, and just west of where the State Highway crosses the Manuherikia River. It lies on the 45th parallel south.

The former White Horse Hotel in Becks was established in 1864 by John Nixon Becks, and is registered by Heritage New Zealand as a Category II heritage building. The township was originally called White Horse, after the public house, but the name was later changed to that of the publican.
