= Helen Cowie (doctor) =

New Zealand doctor

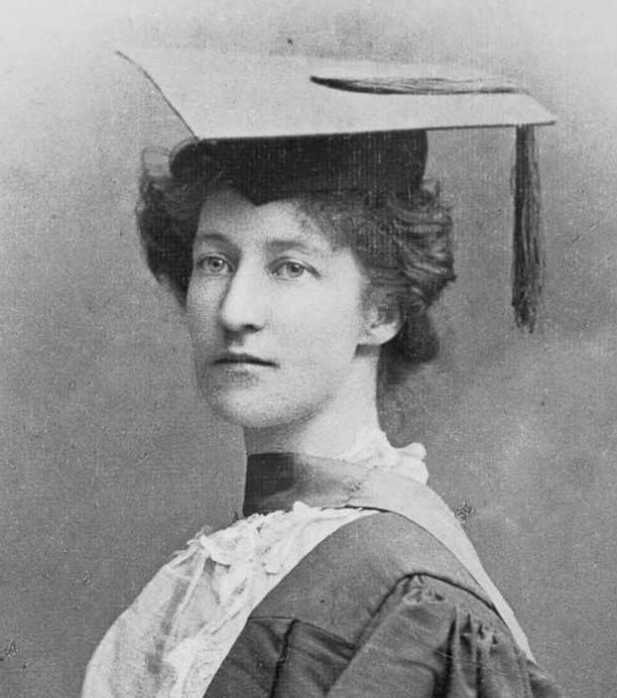
- Born: Helen Stephen Baird; 29 September 1875; Hampden, New Zealand
- Died: July 8, 1956 (aged 80); Masterton, New Zealand
- Education: Bachelor of Arts, Bachelor of Medicine, Bachelor of Surgery
- Alma mater: University of Glasgow, University of Otago
- Occupations: Medical doctor, midwife
- Spouse: James Cowie (m. 1908; died 1941)
- Children: 1

Helen Stephen Cowie (née Baird; 29 September 1875 – 8 July 1956) was a New Zealand doctor, and half of the first wife-and-husband team in general practice in New Zealand.

== Early life ==
Cowie was born in Hampden, North Otago, New Zealand. She was one of five children (three sons and two daughters) of Scottish immigrants James and Elizabeth Baird, née Stephen. Her father was a Presbyterian minister and a strong supporter of Prohibition; her mother was a member of the Woman's Christian Temperance Union.

She grew up in Winton and attended Southland Girls' High School, where she was dux in 1892. She went on to complete a Bachelor of Arts degree at the University of Otago. In 1898 she and her sister Agnes travelled to Glasgow to study medicine; this was their parents' hometown, and where their older brother William Stephen Baird had also studied. Cowie was thus the first woman graduate of the University of Otago to study abroad for a second degree. The sisters completed their studies at the women's medical school of the University of Glasgow, Queen Margaret Hall, and Cowie went on to work at the Glasgow Royal Infirmary.

== Career ==
On her return to New Zealand, Cowie set up a medical practice in Invercargill, becoming the first woman doctor to practise in Southland. In 1908, Cowie married James Cowie, who had been a classmate at both Otago and Glasgow. They moved to Masterton and set up a medical practice there, becoming the first wife-and-husband team in general practice in New Zealand.

During World War I, the couple went to England, and Helen worked in civilian hospitals while James joined the Royal Army Medical Corps. On their return, New Zealand was in the midst of the 1918 influenza epidemic, which many doctors succumbed to. For a time, Helen was the only doctor in Masterton well enough to work.

James Cowie died in 1941 and their son Graham, who had worked in the practice with his parents, was posted overseas with the New Zealand Medical Corps. Cowie ran the practice alone until Graham returned in 1945 and she was able to retire.

Cowie died in Masterton in 1956.
