= Henry Croxford =

English cricketer (1845–1892)

Personal information
- Born: 14 June 1845; Hadlow, Kent
- Died: 15 December 1892 (aged 47); Faversham, Kent
- Batting: Right-handed
- Bowling: Right-arm fast

Domestic team information
- Years: Team
- 1869–1877: Kent County Cricket Club
- FC debut: 23 August 1869 Kent v Surrey
- Last FC: 23 July 1877 Kent v Surrey

Career statistics
Competition	First-class
Matches	27
Runs scored	472
Batting average	11.80
100s/50s	0/1
Top score	53
Balls bowled	1,438
Wickets	31
Bowling average	22.03
5 wickets in innings	2
10 wickets in match	0
Best bowling	6/45
Catches/stumpings	9/–
- Source: CricInfo, 10 June 2022

Henry Croxford (14 June 1845 – 15 December 1892) was an English professional cricketer who played for Kent County Cricket Club during the 19th century. He was born at Hadlow in Kent in 1845, the son of William and Sophia Croxford (née Wickings). His father was a boot maker.

After playing for Kent Colts as early as 1865, Croxford made his first-class cricket debut for Kent against Surrey at The Oval in the final game of the 1869 season. He played eight times for the county in 1870, although his performances were not judged successful―he scored only 80 runs at a batting average of just over six runs per innings, He took only two wickets at a bowling average of 77 runs per wicket. He did not play for Kent the following season, and appeared only once in 1872 again at The Oval against Surrey in the final match of the season. Six wickets in the first Surrey innings and a score of 53 runs, the highest of the match and the only half-century of his top-level career, led to Wisden saying "how unmeritedly he had been shut out of the county eleven".

The following season he played in all six of the county's matches and was the second leading wicket taker, with 16 wickets at an average of 15.87, and the second highest run scorer with 164 runs. He took another six wickets against Surrey and had a highest score of 38 runs and batted with Ned Willsher at Gravesend to steer Kent to victory in a tight match against Lancashire At the time, Kent was considered quite weak, and the selection policy of preferring amateur gentlemen cricketers over professionals such as Croxford did not help this, and at the same time hindered Croxford's opportunities in the county XI. As a result, Croxford played only nine more times for the county―twice in 1874, four times in 1876 and five times out of 12 Kent matches in 1877. A roundarm bowler, he was given the opportunity to bowl only rarely during this period, with George Hearne becoming the mainstay of Kent's bowling at the time.

In total Croxford played 27 first-class matches, all for Kent. He made 472 runs and took 33 wickets. He was employed as a professional cricketer throughout the early 1870s, with stints at Faversham, Tonbridge School, Prince's Club, Cheltenham College, Sevenoaks Vine, Royal Military College Sandhurst, Trinity College, Cambridge and Merton College, Oxford. He later became a publican, running The Crown and Anchor at Preston-next-Faversham and The St Ann's in Faversham. He married Eliza Martin in 1878; the couple had six children.

Croxford died at Faversham in 1892 aged 47.

== Bibliography ==
- Carlaw, Derek (2020). Kent County Cricketers, A to Z: Part One (1806–1914) (PDF). Cardiff: ACS.
