= Horse Range (New Zealand) =

Mountain range in New Zealand

Highest point
- Peak: Conical Peak, 45°16′20″S 170°34′53″E
- Elevation: 945 m (3,100 ft)
- Coordinates: 45°16′40″S 170°32′41″E

The Horse Range is a range of hills located inland from Oamaru in the South Island of New Zealand. The other side of the range is to the north east of the Shag River valley that contains the lower part of The Pigroot. The Horse Range transitions inland to the higher Kakanui Range.

== Geology ==
The range is part of a fault scarp structure whose Waihemo fault strands extend from the Mackenzie Basin to the coast. The Horse Range Formation is a distinct Cretaceous sedimentary structure associated with the range and the south east portion of the scarp. It has become cemented with calcite, partially explained by later overlying marine sediments.

The stratigraphy in the range passes from the highest marine sandstone Herbert Formation formed before about 75 million years ago to the Taratu Formation that overtops the most recent Horse Range Formation that is about 88 million years old. A layer in some of the Horse Range Formation is a ignimbrite rhyolitic deposit from what must have been a surface eruption at about 112 million years ago. Underneath this is the basement of metamorphosed quartzofeldpathic semischist sedimentary rocks of the Rakaia Terrane.

Between the coast at Shag Point and the Horse Range there are a range of hills called the Blue Mountains (there is another range called the Blue Mountains in Otago). The Blue mountains are associated with a marble layer about 200 m (660 ft) thick which extends about 10 km (6.2 mi) named the Blue Mountain Formation. This marble has also been mapped at Conical Hill in the middle of the Horse Range, 15 km (9.3 mi) to the north west of the main Blue Mountain Formation.

== Peaks ==
=== Conical Peak ===
The highest point in the Horse Range is Conical Peak, at 945 metres (3,100 ft).
