= East Otago High School =

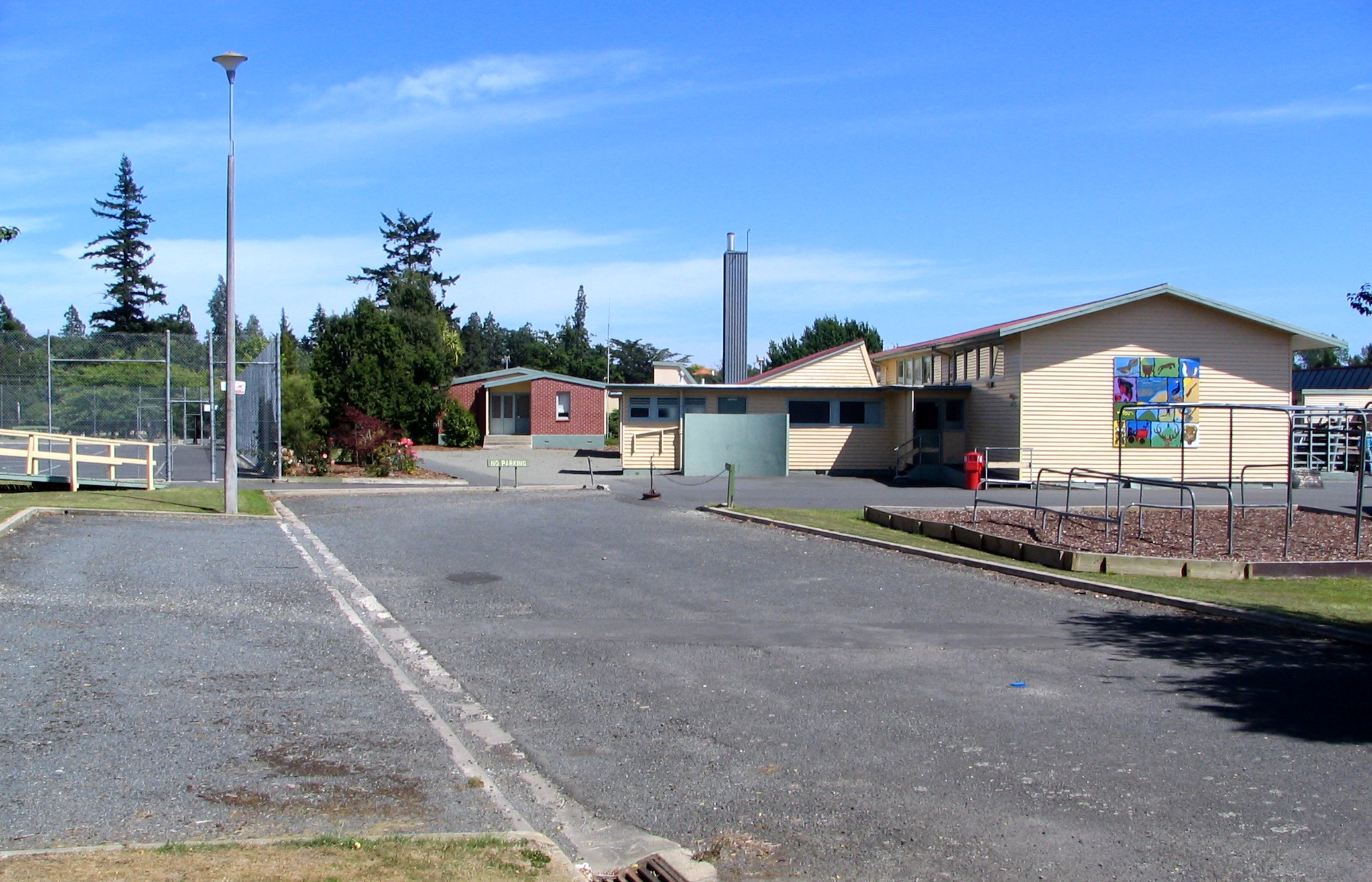
- East Otago High School in 2008, looking west from Horse Range Road

Location
- Stour Street, Palmerston; 45.479798°S 170.721971°E

Information
- Type: State Co-Ed Secondary (Year 7–13)
- Motto: Vis Recte Vivere
- Established: 1885
- Ministry of Education Institution no.: 371
- Chairperson: Peggy Bridger
- Principal: Marcus Cooper
- Enrolment: 196 (July 2026)
- Socio-economic decile: 6N
- Website: www.eohs.school.nz

East Otago High School is a secondary school in Palmerston, Otago, New Zealand. The school hosted a cultural exchange with Japanese pupils from Nichidai Third Junior High School between 2005 and 2008. They won the 2009 Otago Daily Times Extra spelling Quiz for Year 9 and 10.

== History ==
East Otago High School traces its origins to 1865, with the establishment of Palmerston School. In 1885, Palmerston District High School was established, and in 1969, the school demerged to become Palmerston School and East Otago High School.

== Enrolment ==
As of July 2026, East Otago High School has roll of 196 students, of which 62 (31.6%) identify as Māori.

As of 2026, East Otago High School has an Equity Index of 488, placing it amongst schools whose students have above average socioeconomic barriers to achievement (roughly equivalent to decile 4 under the former socio-economic decile system).
