= State Highway 85 (New Zealand) =

Road in New Zealand

State Highway 85
- "The Pigroot."
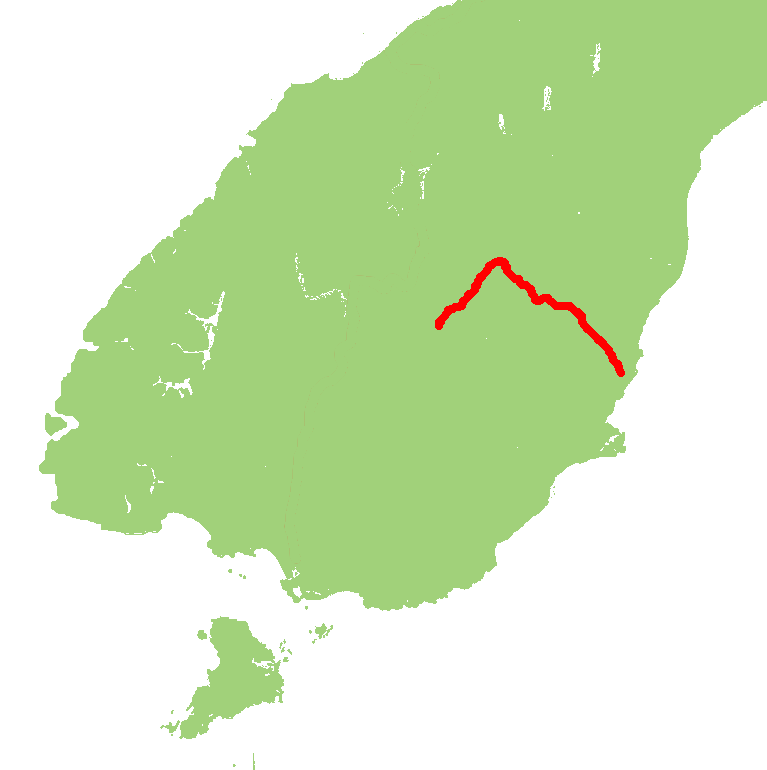

Route information
- Maintained by NZ Transport Agency Waka Kotahi
- Length: 165 km (103 mi)

Major junctions
- West end: SH 8 (Dunorling Street/Centennial Avenue) in Alexandra, New Zealand
- East end: SH 1 (Ronaldsay Street) at Palmerston

Location
- Country: New Zealand
- Primary destinations: Omakau, Ranfurly, Dunback

Highway system
- New Zealand state highways; Motorways and expressways; List
← SH 84	→ SH 86

State Highway 85 (SH 85) is a South Island state highway in New Zealand, servicing the Maniototo Plains and the North and Central Otago regions of the South Island between the major settlements of Alexandra and Palmerston. It is wholly two lane and passes through some of the most extreme climatic regions in New Zealand. The highway is known colloquially as "The Pigroot". The name comes from the Pigroot Hotel, the only building in the town of Pigroot, where travellors stayed during the 1870s to 1880s. Officially named the "Halfway House", but colloquially known as the Pigroot Hotel, it was run by the proprietors John and Isabella Freeland. Today, the Pigroot Creek Bridge which runs over the Shag River is the only reminder of this town.

== Route ==
SH 85 leaves Alexandra town centre and runs in a northerly direction parallel (but not directly next to) with the Manuherikia River. After passing through Chatto Creek, Omakau, Lauder and Becks, the road crosses the river and ascends onto the high plateau known as the Maniototo Plains.

The road then veers to the southeast and runs across the plains through Idaburn and Wedderburn before the road "detours" to go to Ranfurly. After Ranfurly, the road resumes its original direction and after Kyeburn, the road descends through the Kakanui Ranges as well as through Morrisons and Dunback and the Inch Valley to emerge at Palmerston.

== See also ==
- List of New Zealand state highways
