= Shag Point =

Locality in Otago Region, New Zealand

- township
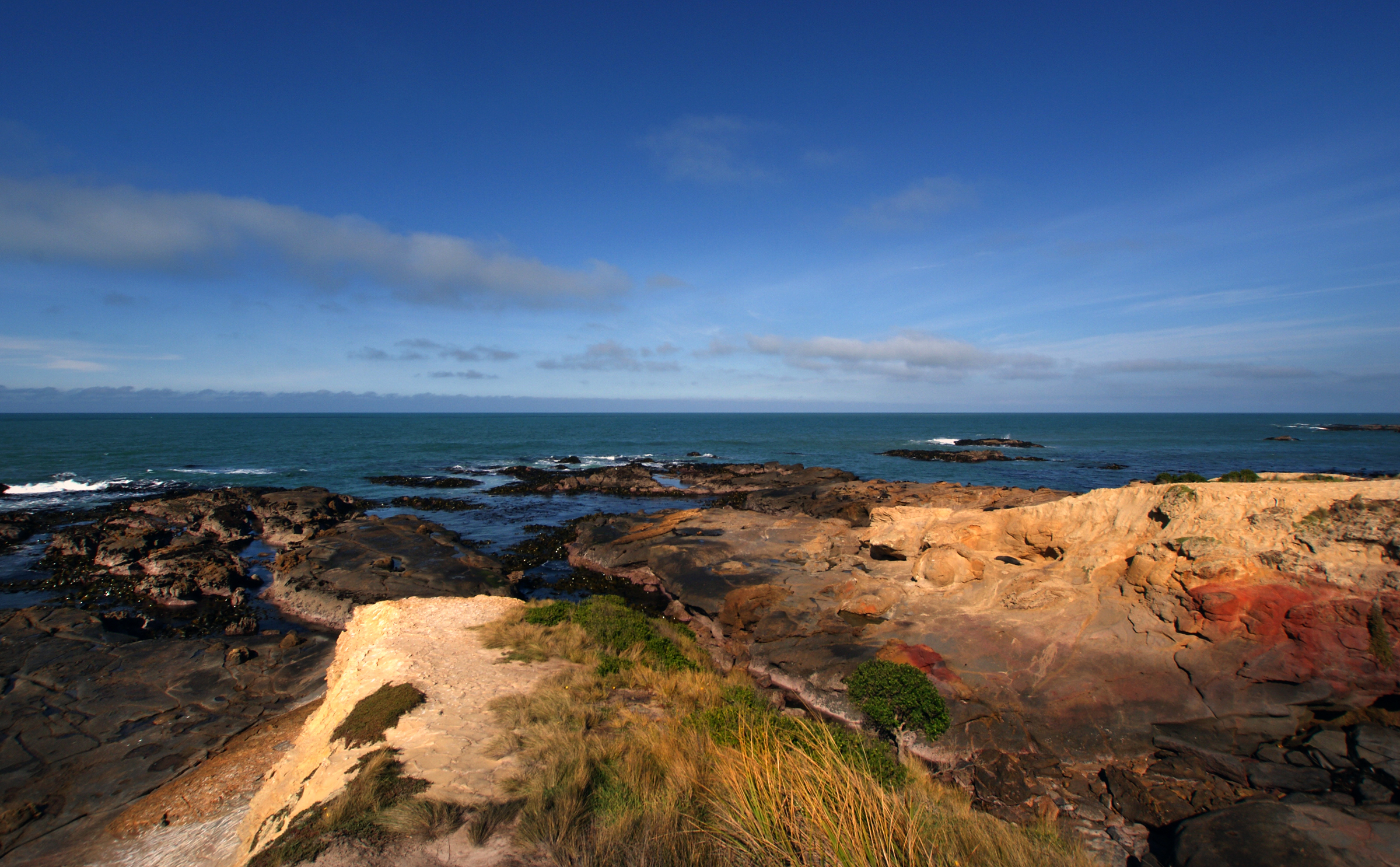
- Shag Point headland
- Interactive map of Shag Point
- Coordinates: 45°27′40″S 170°48′50″E
- Country: New Zealand
- Region: Otago
- Territorial authority: Waitaki District
- Ward: Waihemo Ward

Government
  - Local authority: Waitaki District Council
  - Regional council: Otago Regional Council
- Time zone: UTC+12 (NZST)
  - Summer (DST): UTC+13 (NZDT)
- Local iwi: Ngāi Tahu

Shag Point / Matakaea is a headland and township in East Otago, New Zealand. Both the point and the nearby Shag River take their English name from a seabird, the pied shag.

The township extends along a single road, which leaves State Highway 1 nine kilometres to the northeast of Palmerston, at the southern end of a long open bay known as Katiki Beach. The road links the highway with the point itself, three kilometres southeast of the junction. The point is a hilly promontory between Katiki Beach and the mouth of the Shag River. The headland is within the Matakaea Scenic Reserve, which is known for its population of New Zealand fur seals.

A historic Māori site, the Matakaea/Shag Point Occupation Site, is located close to the headland. It is listed as a Category II site by Heritage New Zealand.

A coal mine used to operate at Shag Point. It was served by the Shag Point Branch railway line from 1879 to 1934. Mine and line closed because of the Great Depression. The Main South Line, from which the branch diverged, passes near Shag Point.

Geologically, the area is an exemplar of the Katiki Formation, and the site of the discovery of the plesiosaur Kaiwhekea katiki. It is also the location of the oldest characterised ignimbrite deposit in the South Island at 112 million years ago.

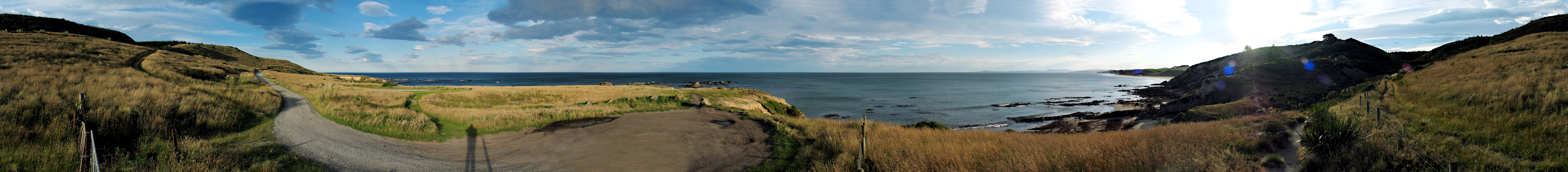
Panorama overlooking the area, on the north side of the mouth of the Shag River
