= Kakanui Range =

Mountain range in Otago, New Zealand

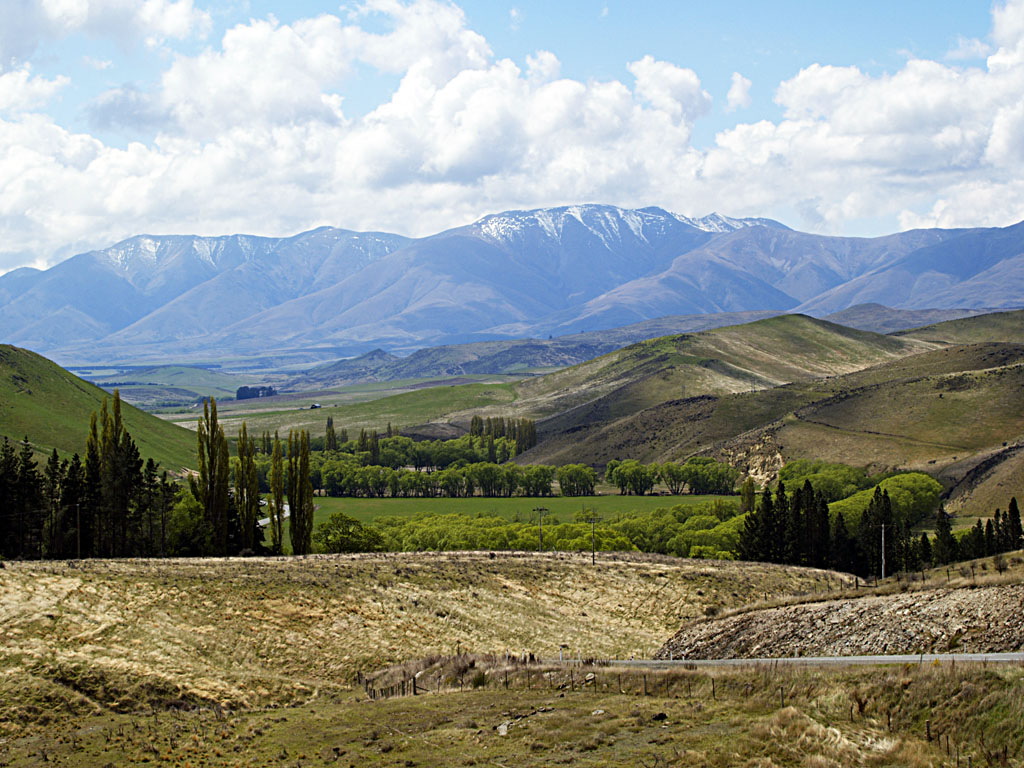
- The Kakanui Range dominates the eastern horizon of the Maniototo.

Highest point
- Peak: Mount Pisgah
- Elevation: 1,643 m (5,390 ft)
- Coordinates: 45°04′48″S 170°23′31″E

Geography
- Range coordinates: 45°05′S 170°24′E

The Kakanui Range (or Kakanui Mountains) is a range of high hills located inland from Oamaru in the South Island of New Zealand. The range forms a boundary between the valley of the Waitaki River to the north and the high plateau known as the Maniototo and the upper watershed of the Taieri River to the southwest.

The western Kakanui Range is crossed by road at Danseys Pass, which has a saddle at 935 m (3,068 ft). The eastern portions start to the north east of The Pigroot and Pigroot Hill to the east of the road is a foothill of the range.

== Geology ==
The southwestern slopes of the Kakanui Range were a major goldfield during the Otago gold rush of the 1860s. Relics from this goldrush can be found at Kyeburn and Naseby.

The Kakanui Range is composed of metamorphosed sedimentary rocks of the Rakaia Terrane. This has been described as quartzofeldspathic semischist.

The Kakanuis continue as the Horse Range and then the Blue Mountains (there is another range called the Blue Mountains in Otago) to the Pacific at Shag Point. Except where exposed by stream erosion or road cuttings there is no surface evidence of the rhyolitic deposits from what must have been a surface eruption at about 112 million years ago that extends this distance of 50 km (31 mi) and was subsequently covered by ocean sediments.

=== Soil ===
The soil in farmland near the ranges is acid and has the potential to cause aluminium toxicity in crops. Partial mitigation can be with lime, with full mitigation with gypsum unlikely to be economic.

== History ==
The Kakanui Mountains were mined for brown coal, limestone, and gold in the 19th century.

== Peaks ==
The highest point in the Kakanui Range is Mount Pisgah, at 1,643 metres (5,390 ft).

Named Peaks in Kakanui Range
Name	Height	Coordinates
Mount Pisgah	1,643 metres (5,390 ft)	45.08013°S 170.39206°E
Mount Nobbler	1,550 m (5,090 ft)	45.02161°S 170.34944°E
Kakanui Peak	1,528 m (5,013 ft)	45.13371°S 170.43932°E
Obi	1,426 m (4,678 ft)	45.18135°S 170.47733°E
Mount Alexander	1,357 m (4,452 ft)	44.98956°S 170.34732°E
Mount Dasher	1,304 m (4,278 ft)	45.14817°S 170.48501°E
Kattothryst	1,293 m (4,242 ft)	45.16152°S 170.50347°E
Pigroot Hill	758 m (2,487 ft)	45.20789°S 170.43096°E
