= Palmerston, New Zealand =

Palmerston
- Town
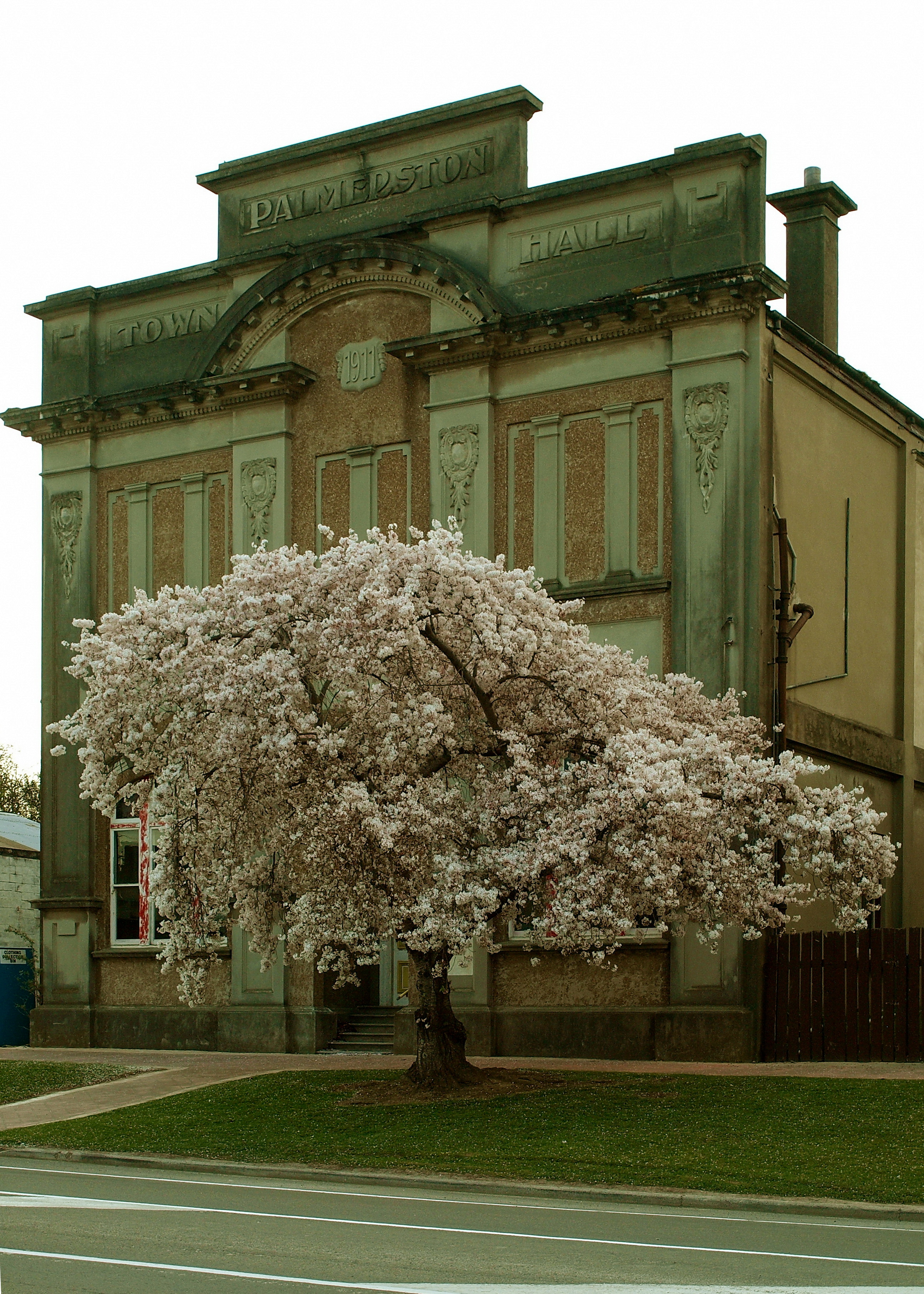
- Palmerston Town Hall
- Interactive map of Palmerston
- Coordinates: 45.484026°S 170.715265°E
- Country: New Zealand
- Region: Otago
- Territorial authority: Waitaki District
- Ward: Waihemo Ward
- Community: Waihemo Community
- Electorates: Waitaki; Te Tai Tonga (Māori)

Government
  - Territorial authority: Waitaki District Council
  - Regional council: Otago Regional Council
  - Mayor of Waitaki: Melanie Tavendale
  - Waitaki MP: Miles Anderson
  - Te Tai Tonga MP: Mananui Ramsden

Area
  - Total: 8.75 km^{2} (3.38 sq mi)

Population (June 2025)
  - Total: 1,080
  - Density: 123/km^{2} (320/sq mi)
- Time zone: UTC+12 (NZST)
  - Summer (DST): UTC+13 (NZDT)
- Local iwi: Ngāi Tahu

Palmerston is a town in Otago in the South Island of New Zealand. Located 50 kilometres to the north of the city of Dunedin, it is the largest town in the Waihemo Ward of the Waitaki District, with an estimated population of 1,080 in June 2025. Palmerston grew at a major road junction: State Highway 1 links Dunedin and Waikouaiti to the south with Oamaru and Christchurch to the north, while State Highway 85 (known colloquially as "The Pigroot") heads inland to become the principal highway of the Maniototo. The Main South Line railway passes through the town and the Seasider tourist train travels from Dunedin to Palmerston and back once or twice a week. From 1880 until 1989, the town acted as the junction between the main line and a branch line that ran inland, the Dunback and Makareao Branches.

Palmerston stands near the banks of the Waihemo / Shag River, five kilometres inland from the Pacific coast. Between it and the sea stands the lone hill of Puketapu (Māori for sacred hill, known by Southerners as Holy Hill), crowned with a monument to the 19th century Otago politician Sir John McKenzie. An annual race takes place up to the memorial and back, which is called the Kelly's canter, dedicated to Albert Kelly who ran up Puketapu as a constable in the Palmerston police force every day during World War II. This cairn is the second around Palmerston dedicated to MacKenzie – an earlier cairn was built on a hill to the north of the town, near Shag Point, but collapsed owing to the unstable geology of the site.

Many people confuse the town of Palmerston with the much more populous North Island city of Palmerston North, whose residents often call their home simply "Palmerston". As a result, Palmerston is sometimes called "Palmerston South" to disambiguate the two towns. Otago's town has the earlier claim to the name, however – its surveying dates from 1862, whereas the northern city did not receive its name until 1871. Both towns take their names from Lord Palmerston, the 19th-century British Prime Minister.

The nearby Shag River is named for the cormorant, a sea bird that ventures a little inland, colloquially known as a 'shag'. The river's Māori name, 'Waihemo', has been translated as 'Dwindle River'. It is thought to arise from the river's tendency to reduce in summer to a small stream. Palmerston used to be the capital of the Waihemo County, the surrounding district, before it was amalgamated with the Waitaki District in 1989.

== History and legend ==
The area is rich in history and legend. Modern archaeology favours a date for the first settlement of New Zealand by Polynesian people about 1150 AD when population was concentrated on the east coast of the South Island. There is a substantial early settlement site of the Archaic or moa hunter phase of Māori culture near Palmerston on the sea coast at the mouth of the Shag River. It has been known to Europeans since the 1840s and was investigated from an early time by archaeologists. In 1987 and 1989 it was very thoroughly re-excavated by a team including Professor Atholl Anderson. It was determined it had been in permanent, year round occupation 'for a period of perhaps 20–50 years in the 14th century AD'. (Anderson and others, 1996, p. 67.)

The area is also the traditional site of the wreck of the Arai Te Uru canoe. There are several versions of the tradition but they tell of the arrival of Rākaihautū from the ancestral homeland Hawaiki who met the Kahui Tipua people who were already here. He showed them kumara, or sweet potatoes, and they built canoes including Arai Te Uru to go to Hawaiki and bring back this new and valuable food. However, on its return the vessel became waterlogged off the Waitaki River mouth. It spilled food baskets on Moeraki and Katiki beaches and was wrecked at Shag Point / Matakaea, where it turned into what is now called Danger Reef. Its steersman, Hipo, sits erect at the stern. After this the crew explored the southern South Island giving many place names. Kahui Tipua are 'ghost or giant people' with mythic or magical attributes, although they are also the real ancestors of people living now. (Anderson, 1983, p. 7.) If the explorers did not get back before dawn they turned into hills and other natural features. One of them was a woman Puketapu who got as far south as Owaka in South Otago. When she got back to the Waihemo Valley dawn broke and she was turned into the hill Puketapu overlooking Palmerston.

The story is seen as an allegorical explanation of the fact that kūmara does not grow south of Banks Peninsula. Arai Te Uru is an ancestral canoe of the Kāti Māmoe people who came to the south before Kāi Tahu (Ngāi Tahu in modern standard Māori) but were preceded by earlier peoples. The Arai Te Uru tradition reflects this with its reference to the preceding Kahui Tipua. It is tempting to identify the occupants of the river mouth archaeological site with the people of Arai Te Uru but that can only be speculation.

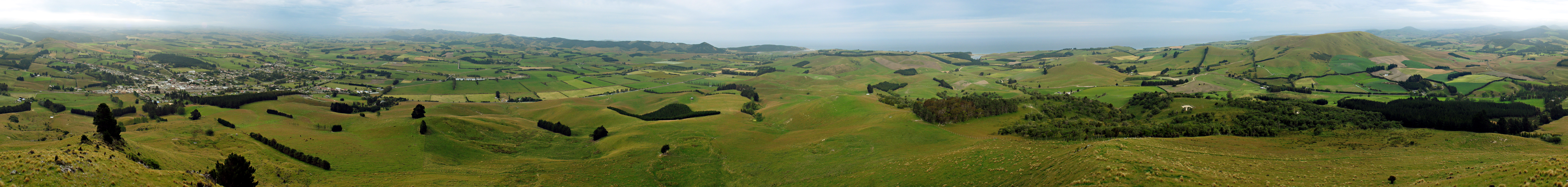
Panorama of the view from Puketapu Cairn overlooking Palmerston

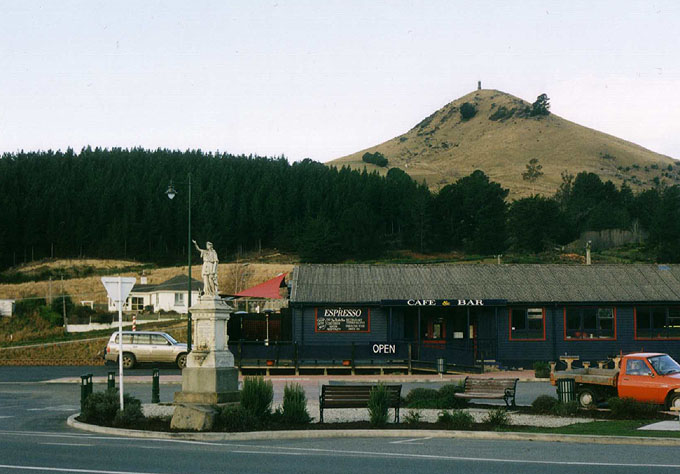
Puketapu dominates Palmerston, New Zealand. The statue at left depicts Zealandia.

In 1814 an open boat from the Matilda, Captain Fowler, under the first mate Robert Brown, with two other Europeans and five lascars, or Indian seamen, came up the east coast past Palmerston and camped for the night ashore north of Moeraki. They were seen and attacked by Māori because of a feud started four years earlier by the theft of a shirt. According to the Creed manuscript, discovered in 2003, two men 'escaped through the darkness of the night & fled as far as Goodwood Bobby's Head' a little south of Palmerston on the coast. They were two days and nights on the way and the Māori people there fed them. However '30 Natives went to the place & massacred them – eat them.' One of the Europeans put up a grim struggle and the mere or club which dispatched him was long remembered. There was a dispute about killing these men after they had been entertained but those bent on vengeance prevailed.

In May 1826 Thomas Shepherd, (1779–1835), passing this coast in the Rosanna, made a sketch of it which still survives in the Mitchell Library, Sydney.

There were European visitors in the 1840s, such as Edward Shortland. Charles Suisted took up land in the area in the 1850s and Palmerston came into existence as a camp site in 1862 as the beginning of a route by the Shag Valley to the Central Otago gold diggings. It was surveyed and named in 1864. There is a handsome Presbyterian Church made of a local sandstone, designed by David Ross in 1876. A marble statue of Zealandia by Carlo Bergamini in the centre of the town is a Boer War memorial.

A few kilometres inland, at the Shag Valley Station, Frank Bell made the first New Zealand to England radio contact on 18 October 1924, an event which attracted international media attention as the first round-the-world radio broadcast.

== Demographics ==
Palmerston is described by Statistics New Zealand as a rural settlement. It covers 8.75 km^{2} (3.38 sq mi) and had an estimated population of 1,080 as of June 2025, with a population density of 123 people per km^{2}.

Historical population
Year	Pop.	±% p.a.
2006	921	—
2013	891	−0.47%
2018	948	+1.25%
2023	1,056	+2.18%

Palmerston had a population of 1,056 in the 2023 New Zealand census, an increase of 108 people (11.4%) since the 2018 census, and an increase of 165 people (18.5%) since the 2013 census. There were 534 males, 516 females, and 9 people of other genders in 477 dwellings. 3.1% of people identified as LGBTIQ+. The median age was 47.9 years (compared with 38.1 years nationally). There were 180 people (17.0%) aged under 15 years, 147 (13.9%) aged 15 to 29, 462 (43.8%) aged 30 to 64, and 270 (25.6%) aged 65 or older.

People could identify as more than one ethnicity. The results were 89.8% European (Pākehā); 15.6% Māori; 2.6% Pasifika; 2.3% Asian; 1.1% Middle Eastern, Latin American and African New Zealanders (MELAA); and 4.3% other, which includes people giving their ethnicity as "New Zealander". English was spoken by 98.6%, Māori by 3.7%, Samoan by 0.3%, and other languages by 3.4%. No language could be spoken by 0.9% (e.g. too young to talk). The percentage of people born overseas was 12.8, compared with 28.8% nationally.

Religious affiliations were 27.0% Christian, 0.3% Māori religious beliefs, 1.1% New Age, 0.3% Jewish, and 1.4% other religions. People who answered that they had no religion were 60.5%, and 10.2% of people did not answer the census question.

Of those at least 15 years old, 99 (11.3%) people had a bachelor's or higher degree, 492 (56.2%) had a post-high school certificate or diploma, and 282 (32.2%) people exclusively held high school qualifications. The median income was $32,600, compared with $41,500 nationally. 66 people (7.5%) earned over $100,000 compared to 12.1% nationally. The employment status of those at least 15 was 378 (43.2%) full-time, 135 (15.4%) part-time, and 15 (1.7%) unemployed.

== Churches ==
=== St Mary's Anglican church ===
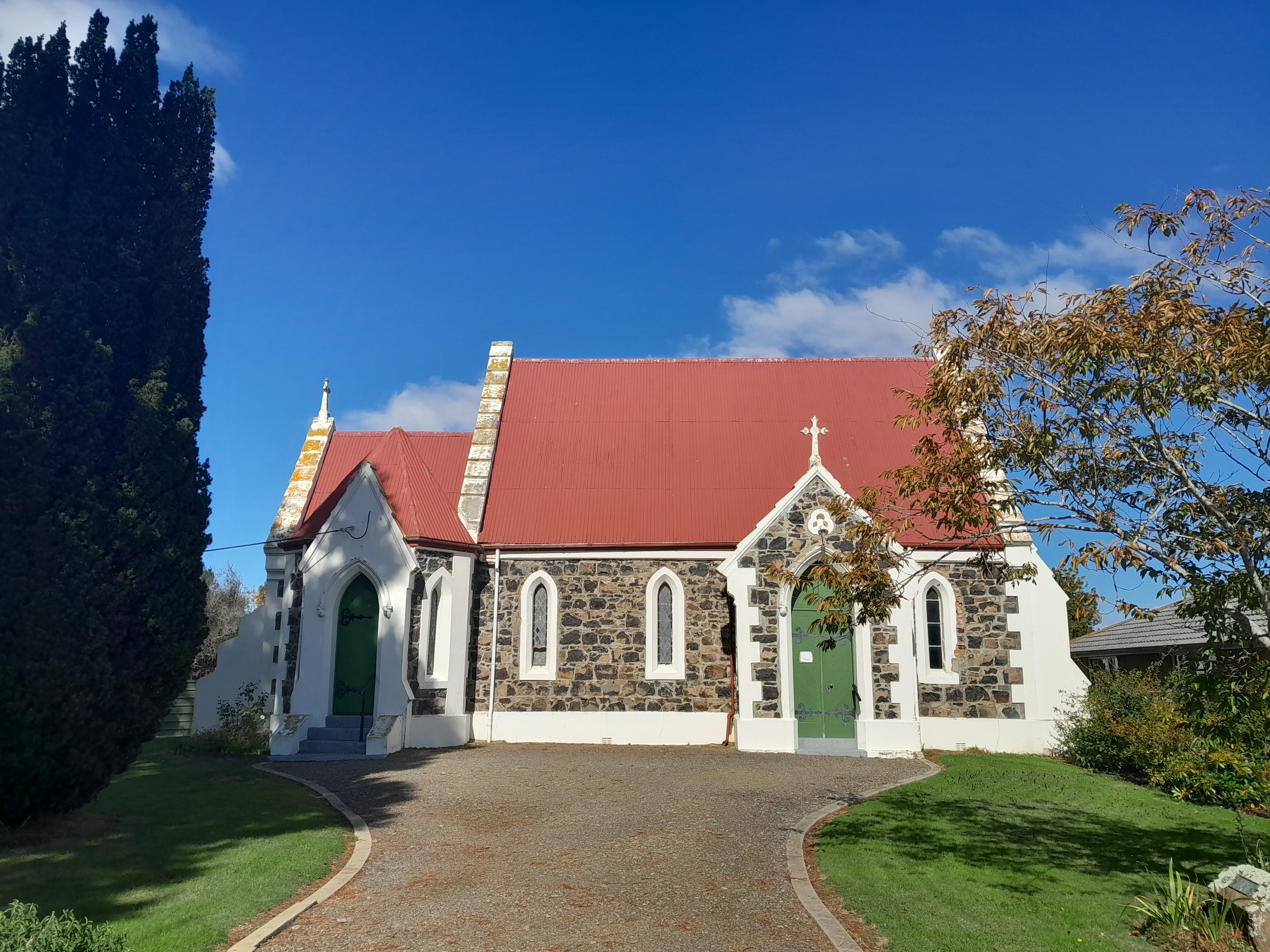
St Mary's Anglican Church, Palmerston, New Zealand (2023)

St Mary's Anglican church is situated on Stromness street and was built in 1872 and designed by architect RA Lawson. It was built in a gothic style out of local sandstone.

=== St James Presbyterian church ===
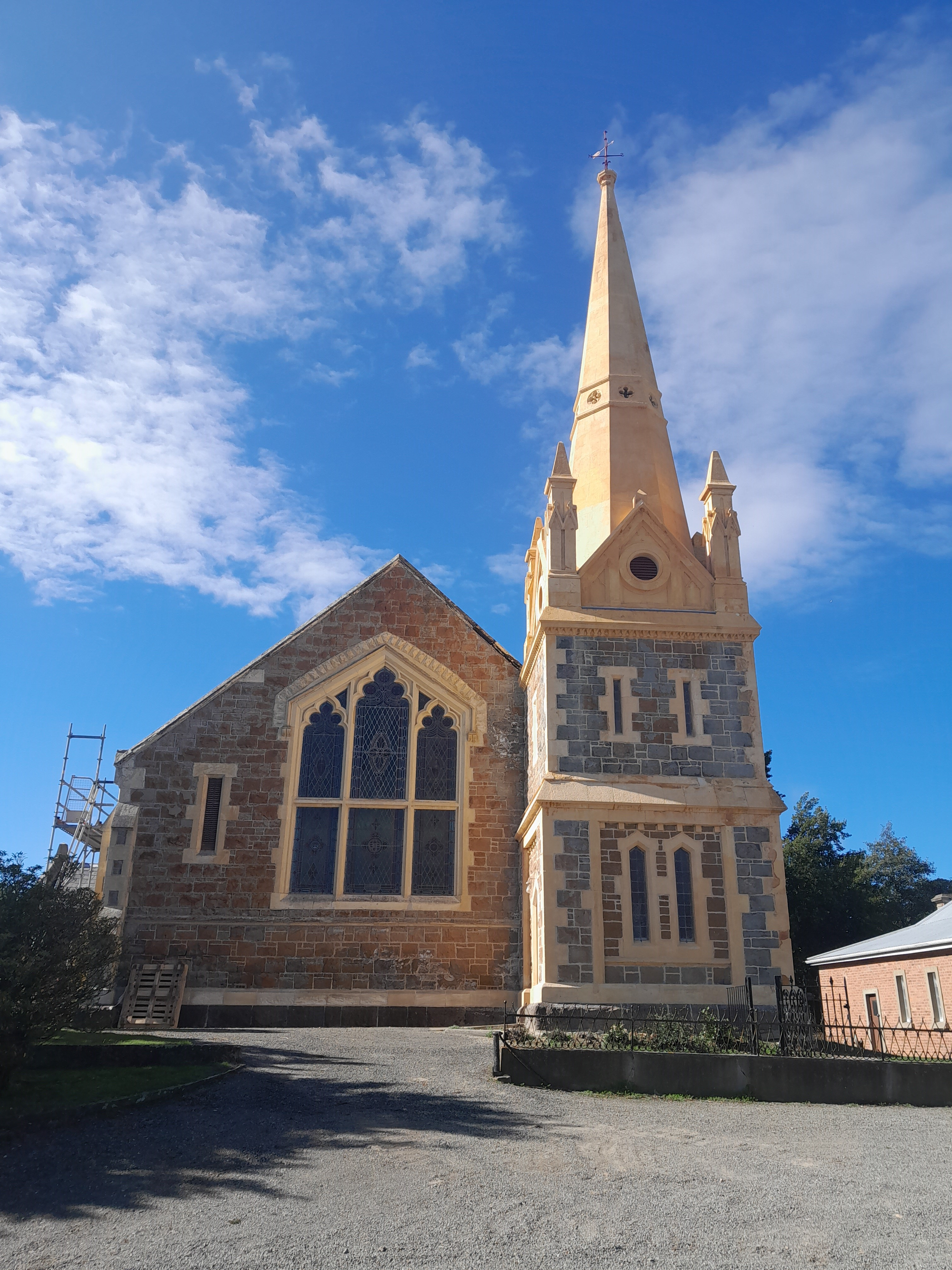
St James Presbyterian Church, Palmerston (2023)

St James Presbyterian church was built in 1876 and is located on Tiverton street. The church was designed by Dunedin architect David Ross and built out of local Waihemo stone.

== Education ==
Palmerston School is a contributing primary school catering for years 1 to 6 with a roll of 97 students. Palmerston School was operating in 1866.

East Otago High School is a school for years 7 to 13 with a roll of 196 students. It was preceded by Palmerston District High School in 1877, with a new building constructed in 1886. East Otago High School opened as a replacement in 1969.

Both schools are coeducational. Rolls are as of July 2026.

== Climate ==
Climate data for Palmerston (1991–2020 normal, extremes 1969–present)
Month	Jan	Feb	Mar	Apr	May	Jun	Jul	Aug	Sep	Oct	Nov	Dec	Year
Record high °C (°F)	33.8 (92.8)	36.6 (97.9)	33.7 (92.7)	29.4 (84.9)	25.8 (78.4)	22.0 (71.6)	21.4 (70.5)	22.4 (72.3)	26.5 (79.7)	30.5 (86.9)	31.2 (88.2)	32.8 (91.0)	36.6 (97.9)
Mean maximum °C (°F)	29.0 (84.2)	28.9 (84.0)	27.4 (81.3)	24.1 (75.4)	21.1 (70.0)	17.6 (63.7)	17.0 (62.6)	19.1 (66.4)	22.0 (71.6)	24.5 (76.1)	26.0 (78.8)	27.7 (81.9)	30.8 (87.4)
Mean daily maximum °C (°F)	20.1 (68.2)	20.0 (68.0)	19.0 (66.2)	16.6 (61.9)	14.1 (57.4)	11.5 (52.7)	11.1 (52.0)	12.2 (54.0)	14.3 (57.7)	15.8 (60.4)	17.3 (63.1)	18.9 (66.0)	15.9 (60.6)
Daily mean °C (°F)	14.9 (58.8)	14.7 (58.5)	13.2 (55.8)	10.6 (51.1)	8.2 (46.8)	5.8 (42.4)	5.2 (41.4)	6.6 (43.9)	8.6 (47.5)	10.1 (50.2)	11.8 (53.2)	13.9 (57.0)	10.3 (50.5)
Mean daily minimum °C (°F)	9.7 (49.5)	9.3 (48.7)	7.3 (45.1)	4.7 (40.5)	2.3 (36.1)	0.1 (32.2)	−0.7 (30.7)	1.0 (33.8)	3.0 (37.4)	4.5 (40.1)	6.3 (43.3)	8.8 (47.8)	4.7 (40.4)
Mean minimum °C (°F)	3.1 (37.6)	2.5 (36.5)	0.7 (33.3)	−1.7 (28.9)	−3.6 (25.5)	−5.2 (22.6)	−6.0 (21.2)	−4.7 (23.5)	−3.2 (26.2)	−1.4 (29.5)	0.1 (32.2)	2.2 (36.0)	−6.4 (20.5)
Record low °C (°F)	0.9 (33.6)	0.1 (32.2)	−2.4 (27.7)	−3.8 (25.2)	−9.2 (15.4)	−7.6 (18.3)	−8.7 (16.3)	−7.6 (18.3)	−5.4 (22.3)	−3.6 (25.5)	−2.7 (27.1)	−1.2 (29.8)	−9.2 (15.4)
Average rainfall mm (inches)	61.1 (2.41)	60 (2.4)	41.9 (1.65)	57.3 (2.26)	55.7 (2.19)	45.3 (1.78)	52.1 (2.05)	54.3 (2.14)	42.9 (1.69)	51.5 (2.03)	50.6 (1.99)	57.5 (2.26)	630.2 (24.85)
Mean monthly sunshine hours	170.8	165.6	158.8	135.1	113.3	101.9	114.7	129.5	136.9	171.8	169.6	166.5	1,734.5
Source: NIWA

== Notable people ==
Notable people born in Palmerston include:

- Ged Baldwin (1907–1991), Canadian politician
- Thomas Beck (engineer) (1900–1948), civil engineer
- Margaret Cruickshank (1871–1918), New Zealand's first registered female doctor
- Arthur Gilligan (footballer) (1879–1963), Australian rules footballer
- Jeff Matheson (1948–present), rugby player
- Allan Parkhill (1912–1986), rugby player
- Tahu Potiki (1966–2019), Māori leader
- Jeff Robson (sportsman) (1926–2022), badminton and tennis player
- Heather Roy (1964–present), politician
- Carl Worker (1955–present), diplomat
- Dion Workman musician

== Sources ==
- Anderson, A. (1983) When All the Moa-Ovens Grew Cold Dunedin, NZ: Otago Heritage Books
- Anderson, A. (1998) The Welcome of Strangers Dunedin, NZ; University of Otago Press, with Dunedin City Council ISBN 1-877133-41-8 pb.
- Anderson, A (and others) (1996) Shag River Mouth Canberra, Aus; The Australian National University. OCLC 34751263 ISBN 0-7315-0342-1.
- Dann, C. & Peat, N. (1989). Dunedin, North and South Otago. Wellington, NZ: GP Books. ISBN 0-477-01438-0.
- Entwisle, P. (2005) Taka a Vignette Life of William Tucker 1784-1817 Dunedin, NZ: Port Daniel Press. ISBN 0-473-10098-3.
- Griffiths, G. (1982) In the Land of Dwindle River Dunedin, NZ: Otago Heritage Books.
- Moore, C.W.S.(1958) Northern Approaches Dunedin, NZ: Otago Centennial Historical Committee.
