= Dunback =

Dunback Waihemo
- town
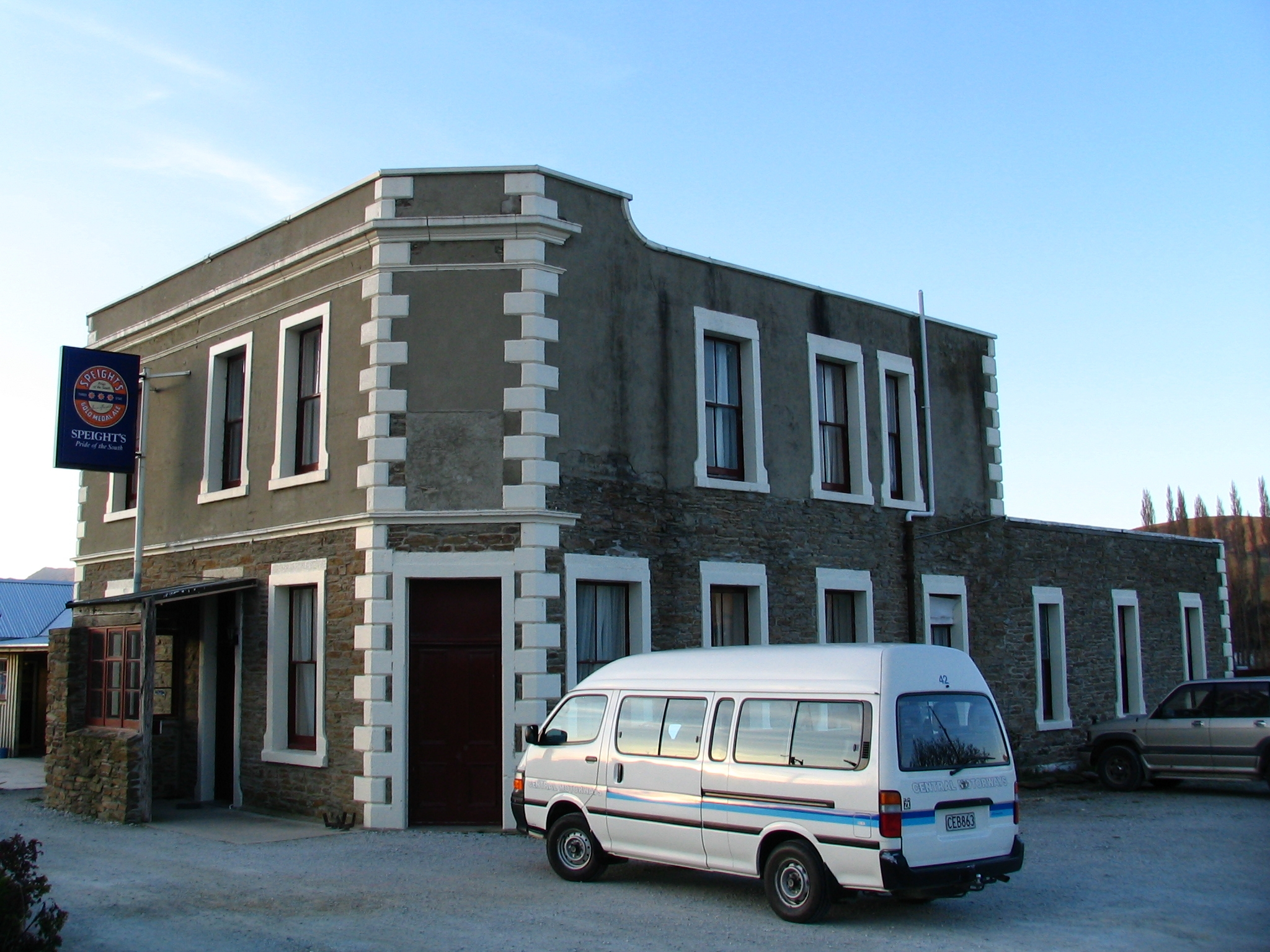
- The Highwayman Hotel at Dunback, built from local schist and limestone in 1864.
- Interactive map of Dunback
- Coordinates: 45°23′S 170°38′E
- Country: New Zealand
- Region: Otago
- Territorial authority: Waitaki District
- Ward: Waihemo Ward
- Community: Waihemo Community
- Electorates: Waitaki; Te Tai Tonga (Māori)

Government
  - Territorial authority: Waitaki District Council
  - Regional council: Otago Regional Council
  - Mayor of Waitaki: Melanie Tavendale
  - Waitaki MP: Miles Anderson
  - Te Tai Tonga MP: Mananui Ramsden

Area
  - Total: 135.74 km^{2} (52.41 sq mi)

Population (2023 census)
  - Total: 132
  - Density: 0.972/km^{2} (2.52/sq mi)
- Time zone: UTC+12 (New Zealand Standard Time)
  - Summer (DST): UTC+13 (New Zealand Daylight Time)
- Postcode: 9483

Dunback, formerly Waihemo, is a small town in the Otago region of New Zealand. It is located between Palmerston and Ranfurly on Highway 85. It has a population of about 200 people. Most of these people live in the rural areas near the town.

The New Zealand Ministry for Culture and Heritage gives a translation of "the finished stream" for Waihemo.

The only remaining buildings now that still stand are the church, the Highwayman Hotel, the coronation hall and the Dunback school. All of these buildings are over 100 years old. There is also the domain which includes a cricket field, camping ground and bowling green. Locals and campers both enjoy the facilities that it has to offer. Along Murphy Street also stands the swing bridge which was built in the early 1900s for pupils to cross the Shag River for easier access to the school.

From 29 August 1885 until 1 January 1968, the town was the terminus of the Dunback Branch, a branch line railway that left the Main South Line in Palmerston. Nowadays, some of the old railway formation, a loading bank at the site of the station yard, and other railway relics can still be found around Dunback.

== Demographics ==
Dunback locality covers 135.74 km^{2} (52.41 sq mi). It is part of the Waihemo statistical area.

Historical population for Dunback locality
Year	Pop.	±% p.a.
2006	135	—
2013	123	−1.32%
2018	141	+2.77%
2023	132	−1.31%

Dunback had a population of 132 in the 2023 New Zealand census, a decrease of 9 people (−6.4%) since the 2018 census, and an increase of 9 people (7.3%) since the 2013 census. There were 78 males, 54 females, and 3 people of other genders in 63 dwellings. 4.5% of people identified as LGBTIQ+. The median age was 56.0 years (compared with 38.1 years nationally). There were 15 people (11.4%) aged under 15 years, 12 (9.1%) aged 15 to 29, 69 (52.3%) aged 30 to 64, and 39 (29.5%) aged 65 or older.

People could identify as more than one ethnicity. The results were 95.5% European (Pākehā), 6.8% Māori, and 4.5% other, which includes people giving their ethnicity as "New Zealander". English was spoken by 100.0%, and other languages by 4.5%. No language could be spoken by 2.3% (e.g. too young to talk). The percentage of people born overseas was 13.6, compared with 28.8% nationally.

The sole religious affiliation given was 20.5% Christian. People who answered that they had no religion were 65.9%, and 11.4% of people did not answer the census question.

Of those at least 15 years old, 18 (15.4%) people had a bachelor's or higher degree, 66 (56.4%) had a post-high school certificate or diploma, and 36 (30.8%) people exclusively held high school qualifications. The median income was $29,600, compared with $41,500 nationally. 12 people (10.3%) earned over $100,000 compared to 12.1% nationally. The employment status of those at least 15 was 51 (43.6%) full-time, 15 (12.8%) part-time, and 3 (2.6%) unemployed.

=== Waihemo statistical area ===
The Waihemo statistical area, which also includes Hampden and Moeraki, and surrounds but does not include Palmerston, covers 1,312.39 km^{2} (506.72 sq mi). It had an estimated population of 1,510 as of June 2025, with a population density of 1.2 people per km^{2}.

Historical population for Waihemo statistical area
Year	Pop.	±% p.a.
2006	1,272	—
2013	1,320	+0.53%
2018	1,341	+0.32%
2023	1,458	+1.69%

Waihemo had a population of 1,458 in the 2023 New Zealand census, an increase of 117 people (8.7%) since the 2018 census, and an increase of 138 people (10.5%) since the 2013 census. There were 768 males, 681 females, and 9 people of other genders in 663 dwellings. 2.5% of people identified as LGBTIQ+. The median age was 51.8 years (compared with 38.1 years nationally). There were 216 people (14.8%) aged under 15 years, 141 (9.7%) aged 15 to 29, 702 (48.1%) aged 30 to 64, and 396 (27.2%) aged 65 or older.

People could identify as more than one ethnicity. The results were 90.1% European (Pākehā); 12.3% Māori; 1.2% Pasifika; 3.7% Asian; 0.2% Middle Eastern, Latin American and African New Zealanders (MELAA); and 3.3% other, which includes people giving their ethnicity as "New Zealander". English was spoken by 97.7%, Māori by 2.3%, and other languages by 4.1%. No language could be spoken by 1.6% (e.g. too young to talk). New Zealand Sign Language was known by 0.4%. The percentage of people born overseas was 15.2, compared with 28.8% nationally.

Religious affiliations were 29.4% Christian, 0.6% Hindu, 0.4% Māori religious beliefs, 0.4% Buddhist, 0.4% New Age, and 0.8% other religions. People who answered that they had no religion were 59.1%, and 8.6% of people did not answer the census question.

Of those at least 15 years old, 207 (16.7%) people had a bachelor's or higher degree, 690 (55.6%) had a post-high school certificate or diploma, and 348 (28.0%) people exclusively held high school qualifications. The median income was $32,300, compared with $41,500 nationally. 102 people (8.2%) earned over $100,000 compared to 12.1% nationally. The employment status of those at least 15 was 555 (44.7%) full-time, 204 (16.4%) part-time, and 15 (1.2%) unemployed.

== Education ==
Dunback Public School was established in 1877 and closed in 2001. In the early 20th century, the school had a roll of 63 in a five-room building.
