= Waihemo / Shag River =

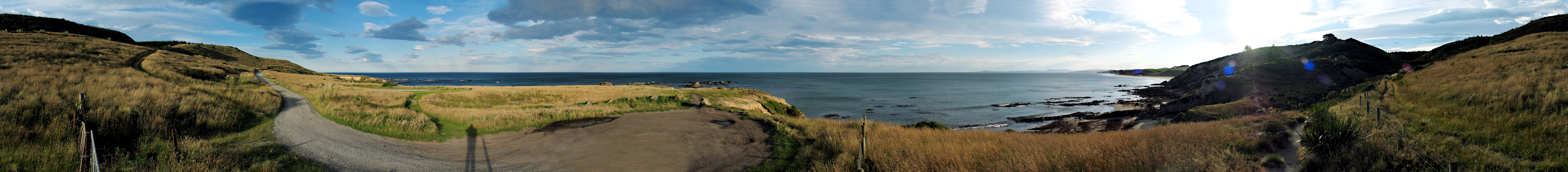

- Mouth of Waihemo / Shag River
- Etymology: The Māori name Waihemo means "river that has gone away" Early whalers named the river Shag after the seabird
- Native name: Waihemo (Māori)

Location
- Country: New Zealand
- Region: Otago

Physical characteristics
- Source: Kakanui Range
- Mouth: Pacific Ocean
  - coordinates: 45°29′S 170°49′E
  - elevation: Sea level
- Length: 75 km (47 mi)

The Waihemo / Shag River is located in Otago in the South Island of New Zealand. It rises in the Kakanui Range, flowing southeast for 75 km (47 mi), or 50 kilometres (31 mi) before reaching the Pacific Ocean on the south side of Shag Point / Matakaea, 7.5 km (4.7 mi) east of Palmerston. The Dunback Branch railway that operated from the 1880s to 1989 largely followed the route of the river from its junction with the Main South Line near Shag Point township to its terminus in Dunback.

The small- to medium-sized river has been adversely affected over the past decades by farming practices in the area. Much of its length is overgrown with willows, and during the summer its flow can become significantly reduced.

In 1985, the name of the river was gazetted by Land Information New Zealand as Shag River (Waihemo). In August 2021, the name was officially amended to Waihemo / Shag River.

Waihemo means a 'river that has gone away' or 'dwindled'. Early whalers named the river after the common seabird.

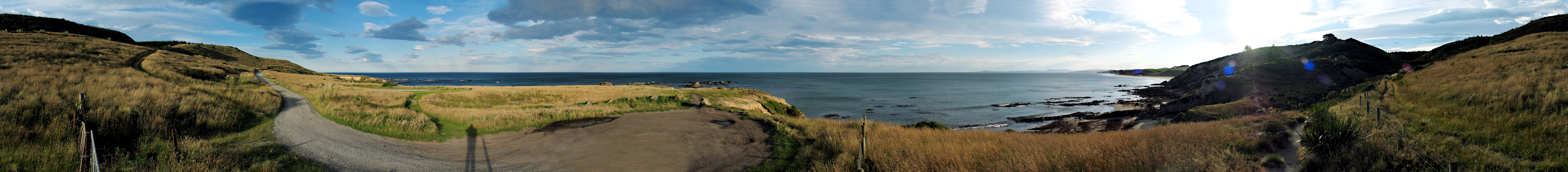
Panorama overlooking Shag Point / Matakaea, on the north side of the mouth of the Shag River / Waihemo

== Pre-colonial history ==
Archaeological evidence shows that around 100–200 Māori settled at the Shag River Mouth during the 14th century, making it a large village for the time. The surrounding area supported a large amount of moa, which became the main source of food for the population. Around a few decades after being settled, the area was abandoned, likely due to the depletion of natural resources, such as moa and seals.

Known for its association with moa hunters since 1869, the area has been the site of archeological work since the 1920s when David Teviotdale, an amateur archaeologist, performed excavation work. The University of Otago ran an excavation program at the site from the late 1980s. It was listed as a Historic Place Category 2 by Heritage New Zealand in 1985.
