= List of railway lines in New Zealand =

The railway network in New Zealand consists of four main lines, six secondary lines and numerous short branch lines in almost every region. It links all major urban centres except Nelson, Taupō, Queenstown, Whakatāne and (since 2012) Gisborne. The network is owned and managed by KiwiRail. The network was constructed starting in 1863, mostly by government bodies, initially provincial governments and later the central government (usually by the Public Works Department) under the New Zealand Railways Department (NZR or NZGR). In 1981 NZR was corporatised as the New Zealand Railways Corporation, and in 1991 New Zealand Rail Limited was split from the corporation. New Zealand Rail was privatised in 1993 (and later renamed Tranz Rail), with the New Zealand Railways Corporation retaining the land (due to Treaty of Waitangi claims on land taken for railway construction). In 2003 the government renationalised the network. KiwiRail operates all freight lines and a small number of passenger services primarily for tourists on certain routes in both islands; Auckland One Rail operates Auckland Transport "AT Metro" suburban passenger trains in Auckland and Transdev operates Metlink passenger trains in the Wellington region; Dunedin Railways (formerly Taieri Gorge Railway) operates tourist passenger trains in Dunedin.

== New Zealand national rail network ==
North Island rail network map (as of 2006)

South Island rail network map (as of 2006)

Lines in bold type are currently operated by KiwiRail

=== Main trunk lines ===
Name	Route	Length	Usage
**North Island Main Trunk**	Wellington – Palmerston North – Taumarunui – Hamilton – Auckland	681 km (423 mi)	Freight & passenger
**East Coast Main Trunk**	Hamilton – Morrinsville – Kaimai Tunnel – Tauranga – Kawerau	1,067 km (663 mi)	Freight only
**Midland line**	Rolleston – Springfield – Arthur's Pass – Stillwater – Greymouth	212 km (131 mi)	Freight & passenger
**Main North Line**	Christchurch – Kaikōura – Blenheim – Picton	348 km (216 mi)	Freight & passenger
**Main South Line**	Lyttelton – Christchurch – Timaru – Oamaru – Dunedin - Invercargill	601 km (373 mi)	Freight & passenger (Christchurch – Rolleston); Freight only (Lyttelton – Christchurch, Rolleston – Invercargill)

The last two lines are sometimes referred to as the South Island Main Trunk Railway.

=== Secondary main lines ===
Name	Route	Length	Usage
**Marton–New Plymouth line**	Marton – Whanganui – Hāwera – Stratford – New Plymouth	212 km (132 mi)	Freight only
**North Auckland Line**	Westfield Junction – Newmarket – Swanson – Waitakere – Helensville – Wellsford – Whangārei – Otiria	281 km (175 mi)	Freight and Passengers south of Swanson; Freight only Swanson to Otiria
**Palmerston North–Gisborne Line**	Palmerston North – Woodville – Waipukurau – Hastings – Napier – Wairoa - Muriwai – Gisborne	390 km (240 mi)	Freight & Passenger(charter/cruise). Mothballed: Napier to Muriwai 2012. Open: Muriwai to Gisborne, leased by Gisborne Vintage Railway from June 2013
**Stillwater–Ngākawau line**	Stillwater – Reefton – Westport – Ngakawau	136 km (85 mi)	Freight only
Stratford–Okahukura line	Stratford – Whangamōmona – Okahukura	144 km (89 mi)	Passenger: leased to a private operator June 2012.
**Wairarapa Line**	Wellington – Upper Hutt – Featherston - Masterton – Woodville	176 km (109 mi)	Freight & Passenger Wellington to Masterton; Freight only Masterton to Woodville

=== Branch lines ===
==== Northland ====
Name	Route	Usage
**Dargaville Branch**	Waiotira – Dargaville	Closed leased to private operator
Donnellys Crossing Section	Dargaville – Kaihu – Donnellys Crossing	Closed 1959
Kumeu-Riverhead Section	Kumeū – Riverhead	Closed 1885
Okaihau Branch	Otiria – Kaikohe – Ōkaihau	Closed 1987
Onerahi Branch	Whangārei – Onerahi	Closed 1933
Opua Branch	Otiria – Kawakawa – Opua	Closed 1985; Kawakawa – Taumarere operated by Bay of Islands Vintage Railway

==== Auckland ====
Name	Route	Usage
**Newmarket Line**	Quay Park junction – Newmarket	Freight & passenger
**Southdown Branch**	Westfield Junction – Southdown Freight Centre	Freight only
**Mission Bush Branch**	Paerata – Glenbrook – Mission Bush	Freight only
**Onehunga Branch**	Penrose – Te Papapa - Onehunga	Passenger
**Manukau Branch**	Wiri – Manukau	Passenger
Waiuku Branch	Glenbrook – Pukeoware - Fernleigh - Waiuku	Closed 1967; Now Glenbrook Vintage Railway
**City Rail Link**	Waitemāta – Maungawhau	Passenger

===== Auckland Suburban passenger rail lines =====
Name	Route
**East West line (E-W)**	Swanson – City Centre – Glen Innes – Manukau; North Auckland Line, North Island Main Trunk Line (includes City Rail Link), Manukau Branch
**South City line (S-C)**	Newmarket – City Centre – Newmarket – Papakura – Pukekohe; Newmarket Line, North Island Main Trunk Line (includes City Rail Link), Newmarket Line, North Auckland Line, North Island Main Trunk Line
**Onehunga West line (O-W)**	Henderson – Newmarket – Penrose – Onehunga; North Auckland Line, Newmarket Line, North Auckland Line, Onehunga Branch

==== Waikato / Coromandel ====
Name	Route	Usage
**East Coast Main Trunk** Original sections from Paeroa	Frankton – Morrinsville – Paeroa – Waihi – Tauranga – Tāneatua	Closed Paeroa to Apata, September 1978. Waikino to Waihi reopened 8 November 1980 by Goldfields Railway. Hawkens Junction to Tāneatua became Taneatua Branch.
**Cambridge Branch**	Ruakura – Hautapu – Cambridge	Freight only. Closed Hautapu – Cambridge 1999
Glen Afton Branch	Huntly - Rotowaro - Pukemiro Junction - Glen Afton	Closed, partially remains as the Bush Tramway Club's Pukemiro Line. Remainder became Rotowaro Branch
Kimihia Branch	Huntly - Kimihia	Coal only. Closed 2015.
**Rotowaro Branch**	Huntly - Rotowaro	Coal only
Thames Branch/**Waitoa Branch**	Morrinsville – Waitoa – Te Aroha - Paeroa – Thames	Morrinsville to Paeroa part of East Coast Main Trunk, 1928 to 1978. Freight only. Closed Waitoa – Thames 1991. Mothballed Morrinsville to Waitoa, reopened 2004 as Waitoa Branch.
Glen Massey Branch/**Wilton Collieries Line**	Ngāruawāhia - Glen Massey	Closed, 1958 (Line owned by NZ Mines Dept, operated by NZR after 1940)

==== Bay of Plenty ====
Name	Route	Usage
**Kinleith Branch**	Waharoa – Kinleith Mill	Freight only
**Mount Maunganui Branch**	Te Maunga - Mount Maunganui	Freight only
**Murupara Branch**	Hawkens Junction - Murupara	Freight only
Rotorua Branch	Putāruru – Rotorua/Koutu	Leased to a Private Operator, 2010
Tāneatua Branch	Hawkens Junction - Taneatua	Mothballed 2003
Whakatane Board Mills line	Awakeri – Whakatane mill	Closed 2003 Leased to private operator

==== Gisborne – Hawke's Bay ====
Name	Route	Usage
**Napier Port Branch/Ahuriri Branch**	Napier - Ahuriri	Freight only
Moutohora Branch	Gisborne – Makaraka – Moutohora	Freight only. Closed Makaraka – Moutohora 1959, Makaraka – Gisborne mothballed 2012.
Ngatapa Branch	Gisborne – Ngatapa	Closed 1931

==== Central North Island ====
Name	Route	Usage
Raetihi Branch	Ohakune – Raetihi	Closed 1968

==== Taranaki ====
Name	Route	Usage
**Castlecliff Branch**	Whanganui – Castlecliff	Freight only.
Opunake Branch/**Kapuni Branch**	Eltham – Kapuni – Opunake	Freight only. Closed Kapuni – Opunake
Mount Egmont Branch	Waipuku - Mount Egmont	Closed 1951
Waitara Branch	Lepperton – Waitara	Closed 1999. Leased to private operator. Waitara Railway Preservation Society
**Wanganui Branch**	Aramoho – Whanganui	Freight only

==== Manawatū ====
Name	Route	Usage
Foxton Branch	Longburn – Foxton	Closed 1959
Taonui Branch	Taonui – near Colyton	Closed 1895

==== Wairarapa ====
Name	Route	Usage
Greytown Branch	Woodside – Greytown	Closed 1953

==== Wellington ====
Name	Route	Usage
**Gracefield Branch**	Woburn – Hutt Workshops – Gracefield	Freight only. Hutt Workshops – Gracefield mothballed 2002
**Johnsonville Line**	Wellington – Khandallah - Johnsonville	Passenger only. Former North Island Main Trunk Line
**Melling branch**	Petone – Melling	Passenger only. Former Wairarapa Line
Te Aro Branch	Lambton – Te Aro	Closed 1917

===== Wellington Suburban rail lines =====
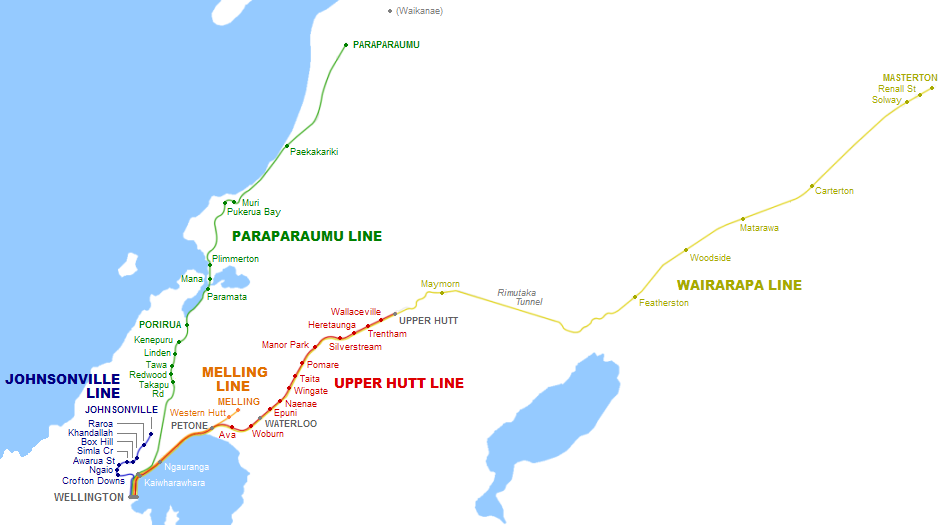
Wellington suburban rail network (in 2006)

Name	Route
**Johnsonville Line**	Wellington - Johnsonville; Johnsonville Line
**Kāpiti Line**	Wellington – Waikanae; North Island Main Trunk Line
**Hutt Valley Line**	Wellington – Upper Hutt; Wairarapa Line
**Melling Line**	Wellington – Melling; Wairarapa Line, Melling branch
**Wairarapa Line**	Wellington – Masterton; Wairarapa Line

==== Nelson ====
Name	Route	Usage
Nelson Section	Nelson – Glenhope - Kawatiri	Isolated from South Island network. Closed 1955

==== West Coast ====
Name	Route	Usage
Blackball Branch	Ngahere - Blackball	Closed 1966
Cape Foulwind Railway	Westport, New Zealand – Cape Foulwind	Closed 1930
Conns Creek Branch	Waimangaroa – Denniston	Closed 1967
**Hokitika Branch**/Ross Branch	Greymouth – Hokitika – Ross	Freight only. Closed Hokitika – Ross 1980
**Ngakawau Branch**/Seddonville Branch	Westport – Ngakawau – Seddonville – Mokihinui Mine	Freight only. Closed Seddonville – Mokihinui Mine 1974, Ngakawau – Seddonville 1981
**Rapahoe Branch**	Greymouth – Rapahoe	Freight only
Rewanui Branch	Greymouth – Runanga - Rewanui	Closed 1985

==== Canterbury ====
Name	Route	Usage
Eyreton Branch	Kaiapoi – Wetheral – Horrelville – Bennetts Junction	Closed Horrelville – Bennetts Junction 1931, Wetheral – Horrelville 1954, Kaiapoi – Wetheral 1965
Fairlie Branch	Washdyke – Pleasant Point - Eversley	Closed 1968; Pleasant Point section operatred by Pleasant Point Museum and Railway; Proposed Fairlie Rail Trail
Ferrymead Branch	Christchurch – Ferrymead	Closed 1868; Now Ferrymead Railway
Hornby Industrial Line/Southbridge Branch	Hornby – Prebbleton – Lincoln – Southbridge	Freight only. Closed Lincoln – Southbridge 1962, Prebbleton – Lincoln 1967, mothballed 2012.
Little River Branch	Lincoln – Little River	Closed 1962; Now Little River Rail Trail
Methven Branch	Rakaia – Methven	Closed 1976
Mount Somers Branch/Springburn Branch	Tinwald – Mount Somers – Springburn	Closed Mount Somers – Springburn 1957, Tinwald – Mount Somers 1968; Tinwald – Frasers Road section operated by Plains Vintage Railway
Oxford Branch	Rangiora – Oxford – Sheffield	Closed Oxford – Sheffield 1930, Rangiora – Oxford 1959
Waiau Branch	Waipara – Waiau	Closed 1978; Waipara – Waikari section operated by Weka Pass Railway
Waimate Branch/Waimate Gorge Branch	Studholme – Waimate – Waihao Downs	Closed Waimate – Waihao Downs 1953, Studholme – Waimate 1966
Whitecliffs Branch	Darfield – Whitecliffs	Closed 1962

==== Otago ====
Name	Route	Usage
**Catlins River Branch**	Balclutha – Finegand – Tahakopa	Freight only, Closed 1971 beyond Finegand
Dunback and Makareao Branches	Palmerston – Inch Valley – Dunback/Makareao	Closed Inch Valley – Dunback 1968, Palmerston – Makareao 1989
Fernhill Branch	Abbotsford – Fernhill	Closed 2003
Kingston Branch	Kingston – Fairlight	Passenger only – Kingston Flyer Ltd.
Kurow Branch/Hakataramea Branch	Pukeuri – Kurow – Hakataramea	Closed Kurow – Hakataramea 1930, Pukeuri – Kurow 1983
Moeraki Branch	Hillgrove – Moeraki	Closed 1879
Ngapara and Tokarahi Branches	Waiareka Junction – Windsor Junction – Ngapara/Tokarahi	Closed Windsor Junction – Tokarahi 1930, Taylor's Siding – Ngapara 1959, Waiareka Junction – Taylor's Siding 1997
Ocean Beach Railway	Dunedin – Forbury Park	Closed beyond Gas works and Andersons Bay Rd warehousing 1942. Closed as far as Strathallan Road level crossing 1990. One rail shared with DCC Tramways and electrified 1908 along Royal Crescent.
**Otago Central Railway**	Wingatui – Middlemarch – Clyde – Cromwell	Passenger only beyond Taieri. Closed Clyde – Cromwell 1980, Middlemarch – Clyde 1990; Taieri – Middlemarch operated by Dunedin Railways, Middlemarch – Clyde now Otago Central Rail Trail
Outram Branch	Mosgiel – Outram	Closed 1953 beyond Woollen Mills private siding, remainder closed 1990
**Port Chalmers Branch**	Sawyers Bay – Port Chalmers	Freight only
Roxburgh Branch	Milton – Lawrence – Roxburgh	Closed 1968
Shag Point Branch	Shag Point – Shag Point Coal Mine	Closed 1934
Tapanui Branch	Waipahi – Tapanui – Heriot – Edievale	Closed Heriot – Edievale 1968, Waipahi – Heriot 1978
Walton Park Branch	Burnside – Walton Park	Closed 1957

==== Southland ====
Name	Route	Usage
Balfour Branch/Waimea Plains Railway	Gore – Balfour – Lumsden	Closed Gore – Balfour 1971, Lumsden – Balfour 1978
**Bluff Branch**	Invercargill – Bluff	Standard gauge 1435mm, 1866 to 1875. Freight only
Browns Branch/Hedgehope Branch	Winton – Browns – Hedgehope	Closed Browns – Hedgehope 1953, Winton – Browns 1968
Kingston Branch	Invercargill – Makarewa – Fairlight – Kingston	Closed completely 1982 except: Kingston – Fairlight (Otago) operated by Kingston Flyer Ltd, Invercargill – Makarewa part of Wairio Branch
Mokomoko Harbour Branch	Awarua – Mokomoko Harbour	Closed 1875, Standard gauge 1435mm from 1866, connected to Bluff Branch
Mossburn Branch	Lumsden – Mossburn	Closed 1982
Riverton Branch/Tuatapere Branch/Orawia Branch	Makarewa – Thornbury – Riverton – Tuatapere – Orawia	Closed Tuatapere – Orawia 1970, Riverton – Tuatapere 1976, Thornbury – Riverton 1978; Makarewa – Thornbury part of Wairio Branch
Tokanui (or Seaward Bush) Branch	Invercargill – Tokanui	Closed 1966
Waikaia Branch	Riversdale – Waikaia	Closed 1959
Waikaka Branch	McNab – Waikaka	Closed 1962
**Wairio Branch/Ohai Industrial Line**	Invercargill – Makarewa – Thornbury – Wairio – Nightcaps – Ohai	Freight only, mothballed beyond Nightcaps
Wyndham Branch	Edendale – Wyndham – Glenham	Closed Wyndham – Glenham 1930, Edendale – Wyndham 1962

=== Private lines ===
Parts of the network were constructed by private companies, and most were unsuccessful. All except the Whakatane Board Mills line and the Sanson Tramway were later acquired by the government. The most successful was the Wellington and Manawatu Railway, which operated between Wellington and Longburn (near Palmerston North) from 1885 to 1908. After the WMR, perhaps the best-known private railway was the New Zealand Midland Railway Company, which constructed parts of the Midland, Nelson and West Coast lines. After the company was dissolved in 1900 the railway lines and their construction were taken over by the government. Some lines were built by companies for access such as to coal mines, and by local government bodies.

- Cape Foulwind Branch
- Castlecliff Railway
- Fernhill Branch
- Hutt Park Railway
- Kaitangata Line
- Kakanui McDonald Limeworks Branch
- Kurow Branch (Duntroon – Hakataramea portion)
- Taupo Totara Timber Co (TTT) Railway (Mokai Tramway) (Putāruru to Mokai near Lake Taupō)
- New Zealand Midland Railway Company Limited
- Ohai Railway Board
- Port Chalmers Railway Company Limited
- Riccarton Racecourse Siding
- Rakaia and Ashburton Forks Railway Limited
- Sanson Tramway
- Taratu Railway (Lovells Flat)
- Thames Valley and Rotorua Railway Company
- Waronui (Coal) Railway (Milton)
- Waimate Gorge Branch
- Waimea Plains Railway
- Wellington and Manawatu Railway Company Limited
- Whakatane Board Mills line
- Wilton Colleries Line

=== Significant proposals ===
Many railway lines have been proposed, especially in the 19th century, but never constructed. An 1873 map indicated that it was intended to link up all the current and authorised routes into a national network. Some proposals have been particularly significant due to their extent, publicity, or how close they came to being realised (in some cases, the track bed was built). Some significant proposals include:

- Auckland Airport Line – an extension of the Onehunga Branch to Auckland Airport, and/or a link from the airport to the NIMT at Puhinui. Other options also mooted.
- Avondale - Southdown Line (land corridor owned by KiwiRail)
- Canterbury Interior Main Line
- Connection of the Catlins River Branch and the Tokanui Branch
- Cromwell – Queenstown, proposed connection with the Kingston Branch extension before Otago Central Railway route chosen.
- Culverden – Reefton line
- Culverden to Tophouse, with branches from there to Nelson and Blenheim
- Dunedin Peninsula and Ocean Beach railway extension to Portobello and Taiaroa Heads.
- Extension of the East Coast Main Trunk Railway to link Gisborne and Rotorua by going inland from Ōpōtiki up the Waiweka Gorge to the Moutohora Branch. So would link the Bay of Plenty to Gisborne and Palmerston North via the Palmerston North – Gisborne Line.
- Fairlie Branch – extension 27 km beyond Eversley, proposals to terminate the line in Burkes Pass
- East Cape tourist line via Hicks Bay
- Haywards–Plimmerton Line between the Hutt Valley Line and the Kāpiti Line.
- Kakahi – Pūkawa (Lake Taupō) line
- Kennington – Waikiwi deviation to Invercargill
- Kingston Branch – extension to Queenstown
- Kirikopuni – Kaikohe line
- Kurow Branch – extension beyond Hakataramea
- Lewis Pass Railway (Reefton to Culverden)
- Little River Branch – extension to Akaroa
- Marsden Point Branch and its Waipu precursor
- Martinborough Branch
- Masterton – Waipukurau line via either Pongaroa or Castlepoint
- Mossburn Branch – extension to Te Anau
- Motueka to Tadmor
- Nelson – Blenheim line
- Extension of the Nelson Section through the Buller Gorge to the West Coast.
- Nelson to Cobden and Westport
- North Shore Line – from central Auckland (Britomart) to the North Shore, and extended northward on the route currently occupied by the Northern Busway
- Okaihau Branch – extension to Rangiahua and Kaitaia
- Opunake Branch – sub-branch from Kapuni to Manaia; extension to New Plymouth
- Otago Central Railway – extension to Wānaka
- Paengaroa – Rotorua line
- Paeroa–Pokeno Line
- Ross – Haast, including rebuilding to heavy rail of the Stewart and Chapman tramway to Lake Ianthe State Forest.
- Roxburgh Branch – connection from Roxburgh to the Otago Central Railway in Alexandra
- Sockburn-Styx deviation and industrial line.
- Taupō railway proposals – connections from Rotorua, Kinleith or Murupara branches
- Te Aro Extension – extension to Island Bay
- Waiau Branch – extension to Kaikōura
- Waimate Branch – extension of the Waihao Downs line
- Wainuiomata Branch – from the Hutt Valley section of the Wairarapa Line to the suburb.
- Wairau Valley Railway from Tophouse to Blenheim
- Westport to Charleston

== Nelson – Blenheim notional railway ==
The Nelson - Blenheim notional railway was created in November 1957 to help manage the political backlash from the 1955 closure of the isolated Nelson Section. State Highway 6 between Nelson and Blenheim was deemed by law to be an NZR railway for the purposes of calculating passenger and freight rates between railway stations in the South Island and Nelson or other places on the notional railway. Passengers and freight travelled by road, with the difference between the road carrier's rates and railway rates subsidised by the government. Rail rates were significantly cheaper than road rates, so the scheme provided significant benefits to its users, while imposing significant costs on the government. The scheme lasted for 22 years, being withdrawn in October 1977.

== Bush tramways ==
Bush tramways were industrial tramway lines principally constructed to haul timber or minerals, often in isolated areas. Bush and industrial tramways in New Zealand operated under the Tramways Act. A variety of gauges was used, including the New Zealand standard 3 ft 6 in (1,067 mm).

Typical bush trams were more lightly constructed than ordinary rail lines and had steeper gradients and sharper curves. With the low speeds that were commonplace, rolling stock and locomotives were generally built to lighter standards than main-line vehicles. It was not uncommon for road vehicles to be adapted, either as haulage power or rolling stock. As road vehicles became more suited for these operations the bush trams gradually faded away and none are now operating.

A prominent example of a bush tramway was the Ellis and Burnand Tramway near Ongarue. An example of a mineral tramway was the Dun Mountain Railway.

Other bush and mineral tramways included -

=== North Island ===
Name	Route	Usage
Piha Tramway	Piha	1906–1921
Smyth Brothers' Tramway	Kennedy's Bay, Coromandel Peninsula	1897–1908 3 ft
Piako County Tramway	Kaimai Range	1884–1924 2 ft 9in
Ellis and Burnand Tramway	Ongarue	1922–1958
Knight's tram	Raurimu	1912–1922
Makatote Tramway	Makatote	1920s–1940
Taringamotu Tramway	Taringamotu, Waituhi	1910–1960s
Price's Bush Tramway	Hutt Valley to Waikanae	1903
Driving Creek Railway	Coromandel	Tourist attraction

=== South Island ===
Name	Route	Usage
Bell Hill mill tramway		1910s
Koranui Incline		1882–1886
Mount Somers Tramway		1886–1963
tramways linking to Ross Branch		1906–1958
Kokiri Tramway		1895–1902
Fortification sawmill tramway		1920s–1966
Port Craig tramway	Port Craig, Percy Burn Viaduct, Wairaurahiri River	1919–1928 Marlborough Timber Co

== Street tramways ==
Major street tramway networks were constructed in Auckland, Wellington, Christchurch and Dunedin, with smaller operations in Gisborne, Napier, New Plymouth, Wanganui, Nelson and Invercargill. Employing horse, steam or electric power, they operated in most cases until the 1950s when improved buses saw most of the tracks scrapped. Urban tram operations, built from scratch as tourist attractions, have more recently been restarted in Christchurch (1995) Auckland (2011), and Wanganui (2013). See Trams in New Zealand.

== Heritage and Private railways ==
A large number of societies operate working heritage railway lines and museums. Most of these are run largely or wholly by volunteer labour, except commercially operated private trust owned Dunedin Railways in Dunedin, which employs paid staff.
