= Outram Glen =

Recreational area and walking track in Outram, New Zealand

- Outram Glen Scenic Reserve
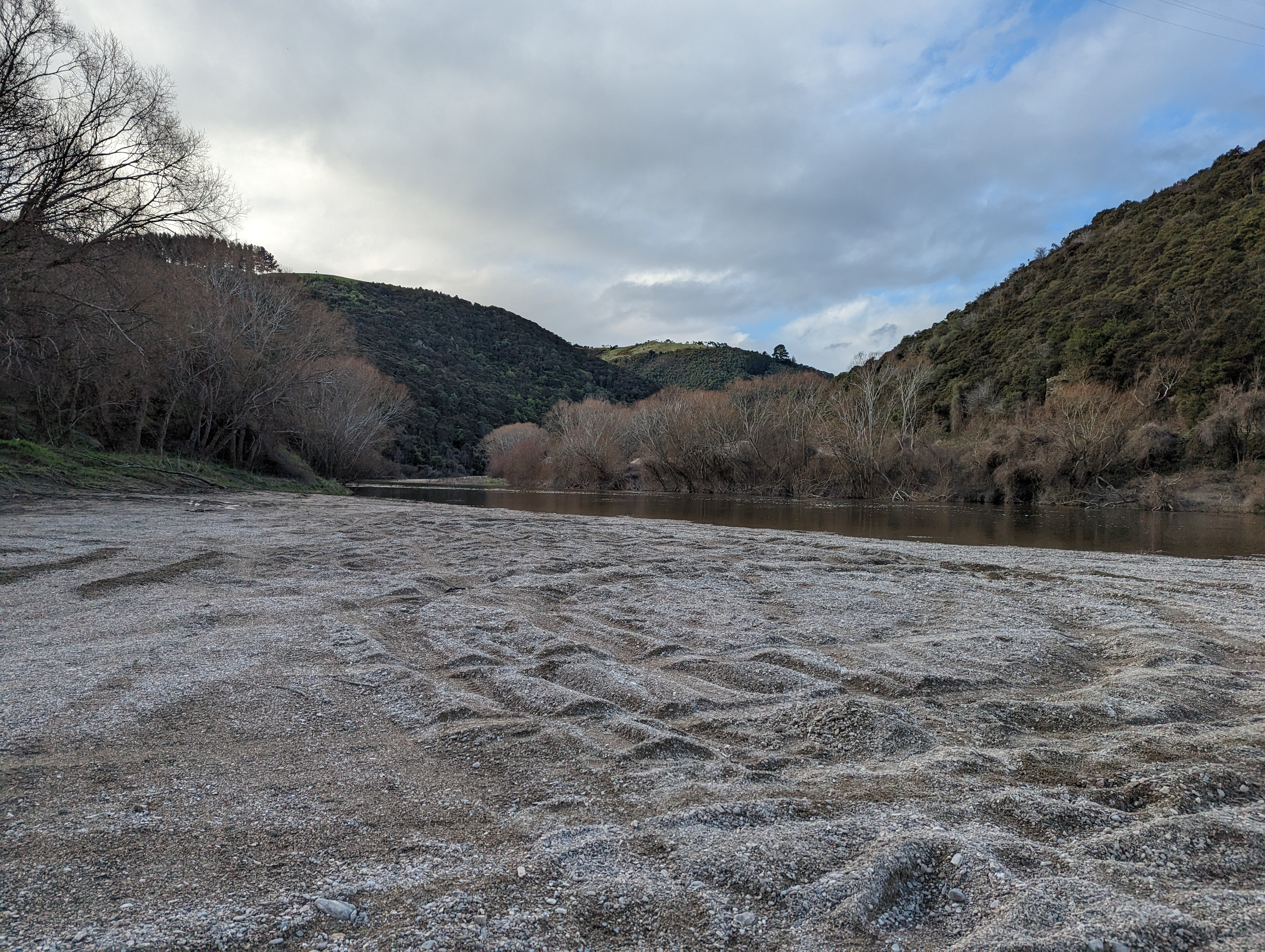
- Taieri River from Outram Glen
- Interactive map of Outram Glen
- Location: Outram, South Island, New Zealand
- Nearest city: Dunedin
- Coordinates: 45°50′57″S 170°14′32″E
- Governing body: Dunedin City Council

Outram Glen is a recreational riverside area and walking track site located on the Taieri River near the rural settlement of Outram in the Otago Region of the South Island of New Zealand. It is popular for picnicking, swimming, and as the trailhead for the Outram Glen to Lee Stream Walk.

== Geography ==
Outram Glen is situated on the west bank of the Taieri River, approximately 23 km west of Dunedin via Three Mile Hill and Outram–Mosgiel Road. The area consists of riparian riverbank, native bush, and surrounding farmland typical of the Taieri Plains.

== Recreation ==
The site provides facilities for picnicking, swimming, and walking. The Outram Glen to Lee Stream Walk follows riverbank and forested terrain to the confluence of Lee Stream with the Taieri River. The return walk is approximately 8.5 km and takes 2–3 hours to complete, ranging from easy walking to intermediate tramping.

== Water quality and safety ==
Water at Outram Glen generally meets New Zealand swimming water quality guidelines, but bacterial levels can rise after heavy rainfall due to runoff from livestock grazing upstream. Swimmers are advised to avoid the water for 48 hours following rainfall. The track and river can also be subject to flooding during heavy rain, with limited alternative evacuation routes.

== Facilities and upgrades ==
Historically, amenities at Outram Glen were basic, including long-drop toilets and informal parking. In 2023, the Dunedin City Council approved upgrades including new toilets, a community barbecue area, and improvements to the accessway to address vandalism, accessibility, and visitor demand. Planning discussions have been ongoing for over a decade, reflecting the site's importance to local recreation.
