= Fleur Sullivan =

New Zealand restaurateur

Fleur Sullivan CNZM
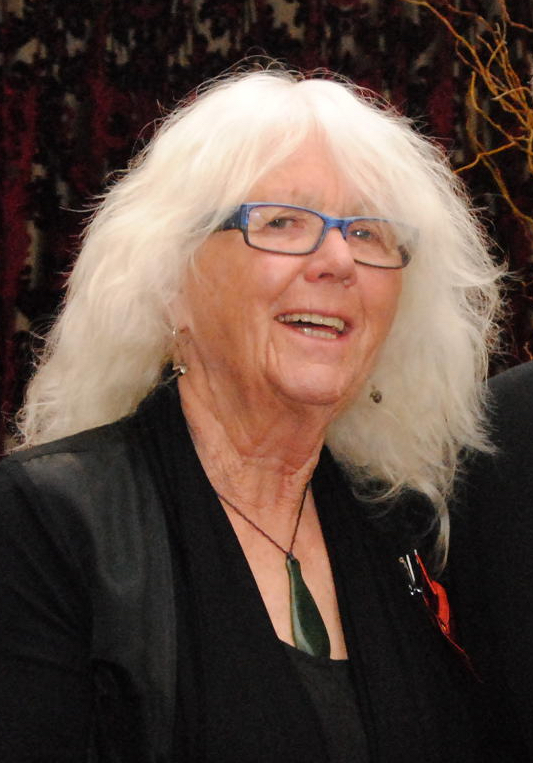
- Sullivan in 2013
- Born: 1939 or 1940 (age 85–86)
- Occupation: Restaurateur
- Culinary career
- Previous restaurants: Olivers; Fleur's Place

Fleur De Lyse Ross Sullivan CNZM (born 1939 or 1940) is a New Zealand restaurateur and author. In 1999, Sullivan was appointed an Officer of the New Zealand Order of Merit, for services to tourism, and in 2013 she was promoted to Companion of the same order, for services to the food industry.

== Life ==
Sullivan grew up on her grandparents' farm on the banks of the Waitaki River. She first worked in hotels and restaurants on the West Coast of the South Island, and then in Alexandra. In 1967, she bought the Dunstan Hotel in Clyde, and ran it as a bed and breakfast. She became a local councillor and founded the Clyde Promotion Group to help preserve the town's history and promote it as a tourist destination. After the breakdown of her marriage, Sullivan moved to Queenstown with her three children, before returning to Clyde in the late 1970s. Sullivan and her partner converted the general store into a restaurant, named Olivers, which she ran for twenty years. Heritage New Zealand described Sullivan as "a pioneer at the forefront of the renaissance of tourism in Central Otago, which in a similar way to the gold rushes of the 1860s has changed the landscape, and marked a new era in the history of the region."

After a diagnosis of, and treatment for, bowel cancer, Sullivan retired to Moeraki. She and her family started selling seafood chowder from a van, and then she opened a restaurant, Fleur's Place, in 2003. Fleur's Place attracted worldwide attention when the English celebrity chef Rick Stein chose it to visit in 2006. Sullivan later opened the Loan and Merc restaurant and bar in the heritage precinct in Oamaru.

Sullivan closed Fleur's Place temporarily in 2021, finally closing permanently and selling her fishing quota in 2024. She wrote an autobiography, which was published by Random House in 2011. She was also featured in the book Grow – Wāhine Finding Connection Through Food, by Sophie Merkens, documenting 35 New Zealand women connected to food.

== Cavalcade ==
Sullivan had the idea to establish the Otago Goldfields Cavalcade, to boost tourism to small Otago towns. The first cavalcade was held in 1991, and attracted 220 people. The 25th anniversary cavalcade attracted nearly twice as many participants, including horseriders, wagon drivers, walkers, and bikers.

== Honours and awards ==
In the 1999 Queen's Birthday Honours, Sullivan was appointed an Officer of the New Zealand Order of Merit, for services to tourism. In the 2013 New Year Honours, she was promoted to Companion to the New Zealand Order of Merit, for services to the food industry.
