= Moeraki Branch =

Defunct railway line in New Zealand

1877 Port Moeraki timetable

The Moeraki Branch was one of the most short-lived railway lines in New Zealand. It left the Main South Line between Oamaru and Dunedin and served Port Moeraki between 1877 and 1879.

== Construction and operation ==
On 10 March 1873, a first sod ceremony was held at the foot of Wansbeck Street, Oamaru. English contractors John Brogden and Sons began constructing a 41.6 km (25.8 mi) long section of the Main South Line, and their contract included a 2.47 km (1.53 mi) branch to Port Moeraki. In November 1876, a section of the Main South Line was opened from Oamaru to Hillgrove, and it was here that the Moeraki Branch left the main line. It climbed down an unstable and steep hillside on a 1 in 34 gradient to the sea at Port Moeraki, with two viaducts necessitated, of about 1,200 ft (370 m) and 1,400 ft (430 m). The stability problems with the land became very evident when the viaduct had to be rebuilt before the line was even opened. The line was finally finished and opened for use on 15 January 1877. Trains ran daily except Sundays.

On Friday 3 November 1876 a train from Oamaru took the new staff to their stations. Two free special trains ran to Moeraki Junction on Saturday 4 November, the first hauled by Possum and Bothwell. A regular twice a day passenger service began on Monday 6 November. In January a special train was run as far as the first viaduct. The afternoon service was extended to Moeraki Port from Friday 16 February 1877.

Local interests envisaged that Port Moeraki, an old whaling station, would become the primary port for north Otago, but it could not compete with Oamaru, especially when a breakwater was installed in Oamaru, and stability problems plagued the railway line. Services were regularly delayed by slips and it was not abnormal for the line to be closed for repairs. The difficult terrain and Port Moeraki's diminished significance meant that the line's continued existence could not be justified and in October 1879, it was closed and the rails were removed. Today, Port Moeraki is a small fishing village.

=== Stations ===
Hillgrove railway station before 1951

The branch was linked with the Main South Line at Moeraki Junction, which was renamed Hillgrove from 12 April 1878. It was 20 m (66 ft) above sea level. After Brogdens refused to build an engine shed in 1875, Peter Dey was given the contract and also completed the station buildings by 24 March 1877. The station opened on 4 November 1876, when the line was extended south from Oamaru. The Moeraki Junction – Palmerston section opened on 22 May 1878 and a post office operated by NZR staff opened on 1 September 1878, closed from 1883 to 1888 and finally closed on 9 February 1970. By 1882 there was a 5th class station, platform, cart approach, 61 ft (19 m) x 31 ft (9.4 m) goods shed, loading bank, stationmaster's house, urinals and a passing loop for 34 wagons. Sheep yards were added in 1926 and electric light in 1931. On 16 November 1951 the 12.6 ft (3.8 m) x 34.6 ft (10.5 m) waiting room burnt down. Mosgiel Township shelter shed, from the Outram Branch, was proposed as a replacement and in 1955 ladies' toilets were added. On 6 August 1967 Hillgrove closed to all traffic, though the station building was kept for use by NZR Road services. The neighbouring level crossing was converted to automatic operation in 1977. In 1992 the crossing loop was extended for 140 wagons.

The only other station was the terminus at Port Moeraki, where ironwork for the new jetty was imported from England in 1871 and it was finished by 30 June 1874, though not connected to the Moeraki Branch for more than another two years. In 1876–77 Peter Dey built a 5th class stationmaster's house and station at Moeraki Port and it opened with the line on 15 February 1877. It closed in October 1879, the station building was moved to Shag Point Junction, the viaducts were demolished about January 1880, at a cost of over £800, and the line was fully lifted by March 1880. Part of the line may have remained, because in 1894 an offer was made for a small length of tramway leading to Moeraki jetty.

== Today ==
Evidence of closed railways often diminishes or disappears entirely, although remnants of a line closed over a hundred years ago still exist. The embankment from which the branch curved away from the Main South Line is visible from both the railway and nearby road, and although obscured by vegetation, other embankments and cuttings can still be seen. Remnants of the Millers Bay viaduct have so far survived the sea and can still be seen at the foot of the cliff beside which the railway once ran. It is possible to walk along the formation of some of the branch's path.
