= Kātiki =

Settlement in New Zealand

Coordinates: 45.396137°S 170.839409°E

Kātiki is a small settlement in North Otago, New Zealand. It lies between the townships of Palmerston and Hampden on State Highway 1 at the northern end of Kātiki Beach, close to the Moeraki Peninsula. The tip of the peninsula, Kātiki Point, is the site of Kātiki Point Lighthouse. The scenic reserve of Trotter's Gorge is located just inland of Kātiki.

There is uncertainty about the origin of the name, though it could have originally been Ka tiki ("The carved figures"). The settlement was called Kartigi until 1927, this former name stressing the local Southern Māori pronunciation. The town no longer has any signage but for a small bridge sign 'Katiki bridge'. Further north along the coast from the lighthouse are two small settlements called the Katiki Kaiks ("kaik" is the Southern Māori version of the term kāinga, meaning village). The houses at the kaiks are very basic and predominantly cribs (holiday homes). Property is difficult to attain there as it cannot be purchased, only leased.

Kātiki lighthouse is home to yellow-eyed penguins (hoiho), one of the rarest species of penguin in the world. Its visitors can almost be guaranteed to see fur seals on their visit to the viewing huts. The area is also a local fishing spot, especially for blue cod.
