= Trotters Gorge =

Locality in New Zealand

Coordinates: 45.403°S 170.781°E

Trotters Gorge (sometimes rendered Trotter's Gorge) is a locality in the Otago region, in the South Island of New Zealand. It is located 12 kilometres to the north of Palmerston, inland from State Highway 1. The gorge and the creek which runs through it (Trotters Creek, which runs to the Pacific Ocean near Kātiki) were named for the family of early settler W. S. Trotter.

The area is a popular day trip for visitors from Oamaru and Dunedin, with several walking tracks, a picnic area, and campsite, and the area around the gorge itself is noted for its geological and botanical features. The area is protected as a scenic reserve, and is reached by road via the inland route from Palmerston to Moeraki (the Horse Range Road).

The 152-hectare (380-acre) scenic reserve is dominated by limestone cliffs through which the Trotters Creek has carved the gorge. The gorge itself is filled with native bush, including kōwhai, kanuka, and other species. Some of the plant and insect life is unique to the area, and birdlife is abundant. Tracks lead from the head of the reserve, one up the valley to a hut belonging to the University of Otago, which is available as accommodation for a small fee, and a nearby swimming hole. The other track loops through a smaller valley, past caves and up to the western edge of the scenic reserve to connect with the hut track. Each trip takes some 45 minutes each way, or they can be tackled together as a loop taking some 2–3 hours.

The reserve is a popular with visitors as it is sheltered from prevailing winds and therefore warm and calm in summer. Care needs to be taken, however, as weather can be changeable in the area, and the creek can rise rapidly. The reserve's campsite is closed during winter.
