= Nelson–Blenheim notional railway =

The Nelson–Blenheim notional railway (1957–1979) was part of the political management of the backlash from the New Zealand Railways Department's closure of the isolated Nelson Section, which ended hopes for a southern connection of Nelson to the rest of the South Island railway network.

== Background ==
The Nelson Section was an isolated, 3 ft 6 in (1,067 mm) gauge, government-owned railway line running south from Nelson to Glenhope in the Tasman district of New Zealand's South Island. Begun in 1876, it reached Glenhope, about 96 km south of Nelson, in 1912. Desultory work beyond Glenhope went on until 1931, but the Nelson section was never connected to the rest of the South Island rail network.

While the line was profitable in its early years, falling revenues and increasing costs of maintenance resulted in closure in 1955, despite protest meetings, sit-ins to stop demolition trains, and a 12,000 strong petition calling for the re-opening of the line and an investigation of an alternative link-up with the rest of the network via a line to Blenheim.

== Political response ==
In response to the call for an alternative connection to the rest of the South Island network, Prime Minister Sidney Holland promised completion of a survey of possible northern routes from Nelson to Blenheim, and reports on other potential routes via the West Coast. A decision on a rail link would be made after the surveys and reports were completed. In the meantime, in recognition of transport problems caused by Nelson's lack of a rail connection, Prime Minister Holland announced the government would subsidise the cost of transporting passengers and goods by road between Nelson and Blenheim so that the charges to the users would be the same as if a railway already existed.

So on 4 November 1957, with an eye to the imminent general election, the National government announced that State Highway 6 between Blenheim and Nelson would be deemed by law to be a 'notional railway', connecting with the rest of the South Island network at Blenheim. Various points on the highway were designated as stations. This meant that passenger fares and freight rates from any railway station in the South Island to designated stations on the notional railway, or to Nelson, were calculated as if there were continuous railway mileage between the two points, even though in reality passengers or freight travelling on the notional railway were transported by road carriers. As rail rates for both passengers and freight were significantly cheaper than road carrier rates, this was to the user's advantage.

== Costs ==
From the start the scheme inflicted significant costs on the government via the Railways Department, and later via the Department of Internal Affairs who took over administering the scheme in the early 1960s.

The first year of operation cost the Railways Department £105,000. Unlike a real railway that can benefit from attracting more custom, and hence more revenue, the more patronage the notional railway attracted the greater the subsidy paid by the Railways Department or (later) by the Department of Internal Affairs – and ultimately, by the taxpayer. In the 1972 fiscal year the government paid $660,745 in subsidies to keep the notional railway in existence.

== Demise ==
On 1 March 1960 the Labour government, elected with a one-seat majority in 1957, broke ground on a line from Nelson to Blenheim. In Nelson reclamation work was begun to create space for a new station and rail yards. However the Labour government lasted only one three-year term, and on 14 December 1960 the new National Party Prime Minister Keith Holyoake announced that all work on the Nelson–Blenheim line was to stop immediately, and the enabling legislation would be repealed in the first session of the new parliament.

This ended all hopes of Nelson being connected to the rest of the railway network by a line of rail. Despite this, the Nelson–Blenheim notional railway persisted for another 19 years until the subsidy was finally abolished on 1 October 1979, by which time it was costing around $10 million a year to run.

== See also ==
- List of railway lines in New Zealand
- Nelson railway proposals
- Nelson Section
- Newmans Coach Lines
