= Fleur's Place =

Restaurant in Otago, New Zealand

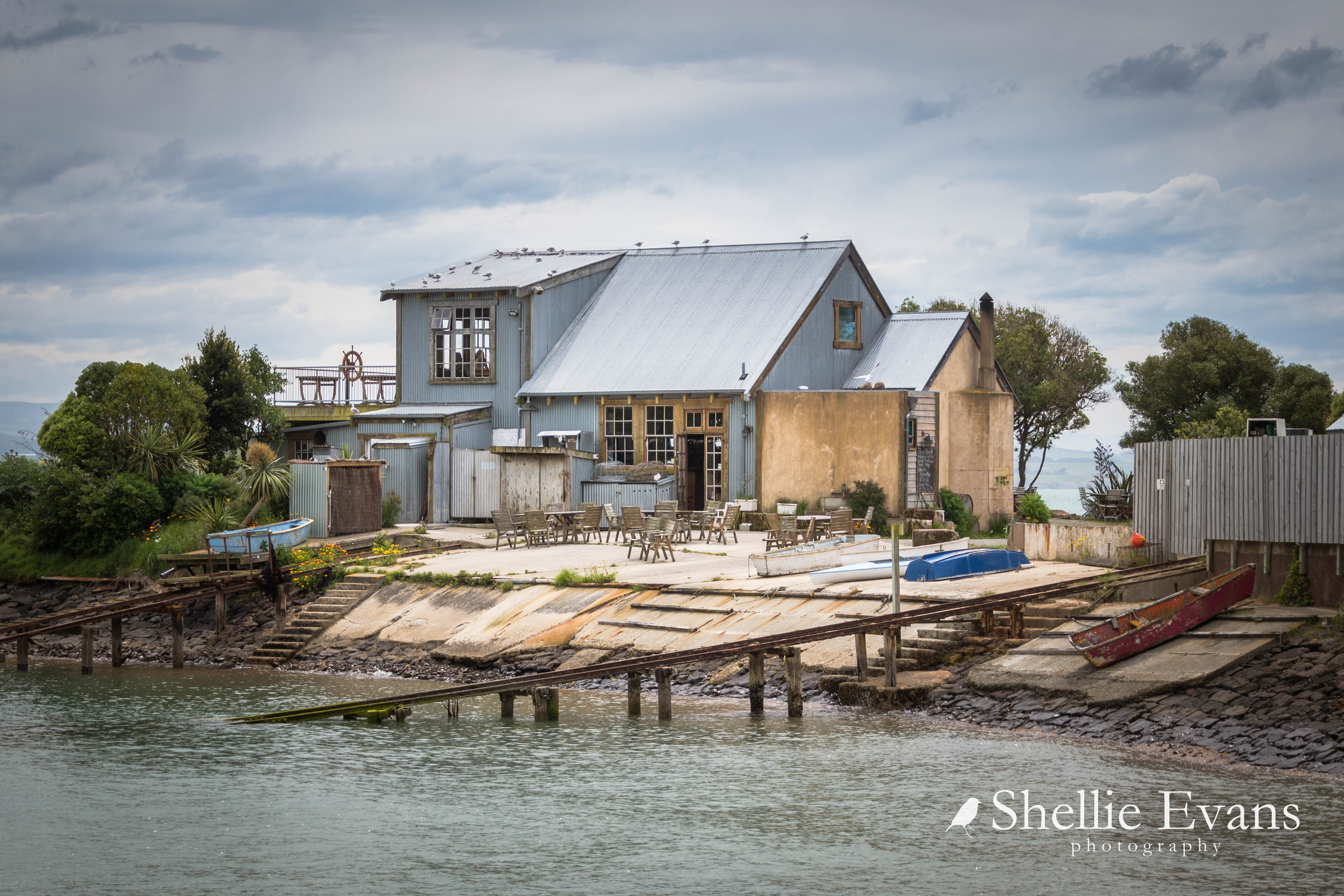
- Exterior of Fleur's Place in 2019
- Interactive map of Fleur's Place

Restaurant information
- Established: 2002
- Closed: 2021
- Owner: Fleur Sullivan
- Location: 169 Haven Street, Moeraki, New Zealand
- Coordinates: 45°21′28″S 170°51′19″E
- Website: https://www.fleursplace.com

Fleur's Place was a New Zealand seafood restaurant on the shore of Moeraki's bay, in an old whaling station. The restaurant was founded in 2002 by Otago restaurateur Fleur Sullivan.

Fleur's Place gained significant attention after chef Rick Stein chose to visit the Moeraki restaurant when offered the chance to travel anywhere in the world to eat. Fleur's Place was very popular, and served large numbers of tourists, many from Asia.

== History ==
In the late 1990s, Sullivan closed her previous restaurant in Clyde, following a diagnosis of bowel cancer. She moved to Moeraki, planning to enjoy the quiet seaside village in retirement. But shortly after Sullivan's cancer was in remission, she and her family began selling fish, soups and bread out of a caravan, which quickly gained a public following. Following the caravan's popularity, Sullivan opened Fleur's Place in 2002. In 2012, Fleur Sullivan was made Companion of the New Zealand Order of Merit, for her services to the food industry.

As at June 2021 the head chef at Fleur's Place was Lyall Minhinnick.

The restaurant was closed indefinitely in December 2021.
