= Kātiki Point Lighthouse =

Lighthouse in New Zealand

Kātiki Point Lighthouse Moeraki
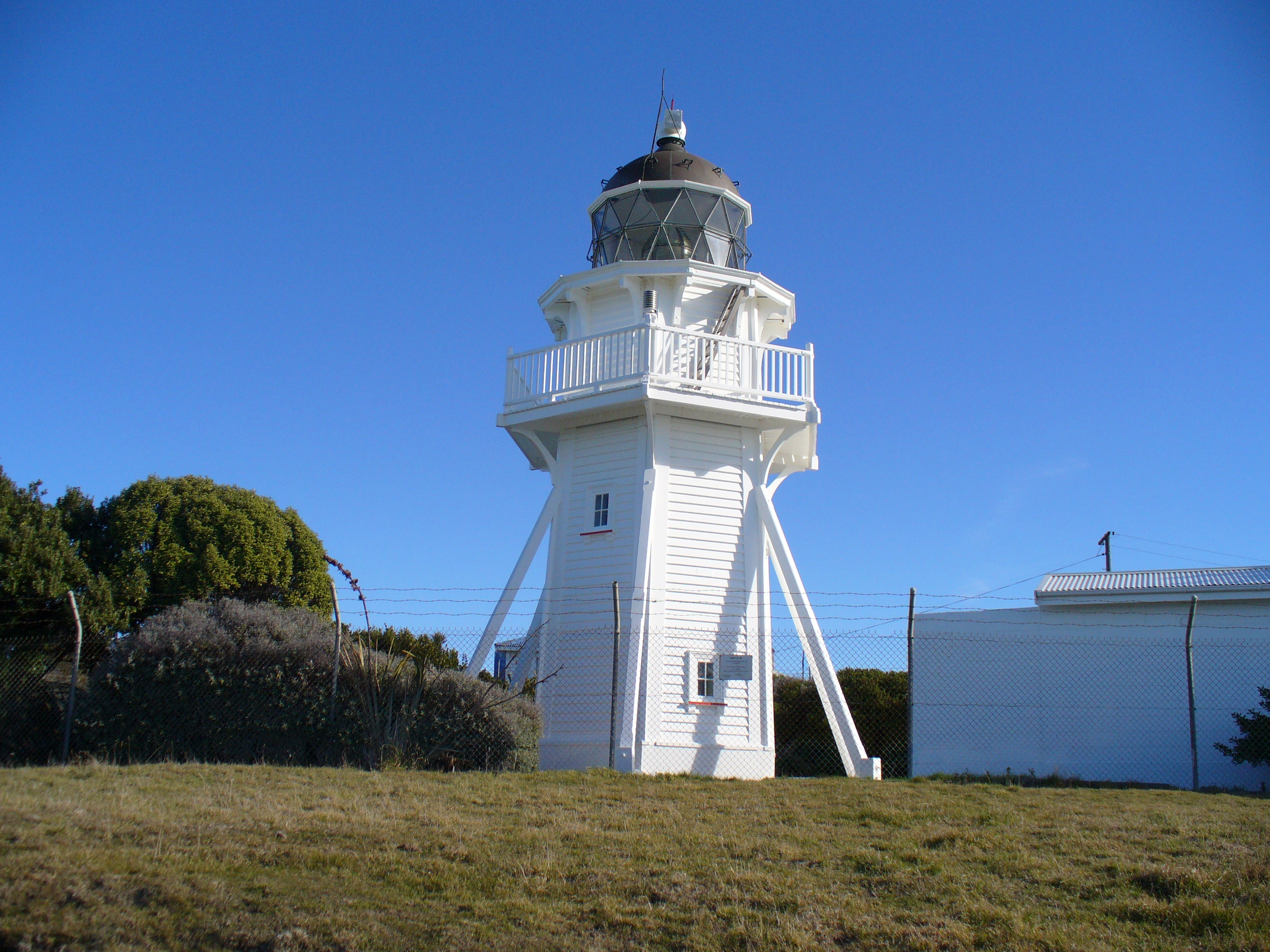
- Location: Kātiki Point, South Island; New Zealand
- Coordinates: 45°23′30.7″S 170°51′58.2″E

Tower
- Constructed: 1878
- Construction: wooden tower
- Automated: 1975
- Height: 8 metres (26 ft)
- Shape: hexagonal tower with balcony and lantern
- Markings: white tower, red trim, black lantern
- Power source: mains electricity
- Operator: Maritime New Zealand

Light
- First lit: 1878
- Focal height: 58 metres (190 ft).
- Lens: light-emitting diode
- Range: 10 nautical miles (19 km; 12 mi)
- Characteristic: Fl W 12s.

The Kātiki Point Lighthouse, also known as Moeraki Lighthouse, shone for the first time in 1878, following several accidents on the dangerous reefs around the area, to make the area safer for ships that sailed past on their way to Port Chalmers, Dunedin. The lighthouse was built between the settlements of Moeraki and Kātiki, on the tip of the Moeraki Peninsula, which is known as Kātiki Point or Moeraki Point.

== History ==
The point has a long history of wrecks, notably the wrecking of the ancestral waka atua on a return trip from Hawaiki, leaving some of the cargo being on the beach at Kātiki, below the lighthouse. Tradition holds that the remains of the cargo are the Moeraki Boulders. Just before the light was to be lit for the first time, a storm shook the tower to the extent that the lamp glass broke. A new one had to be ordered, and the tower was strengthened, before the light was lit on 22 April 1878.

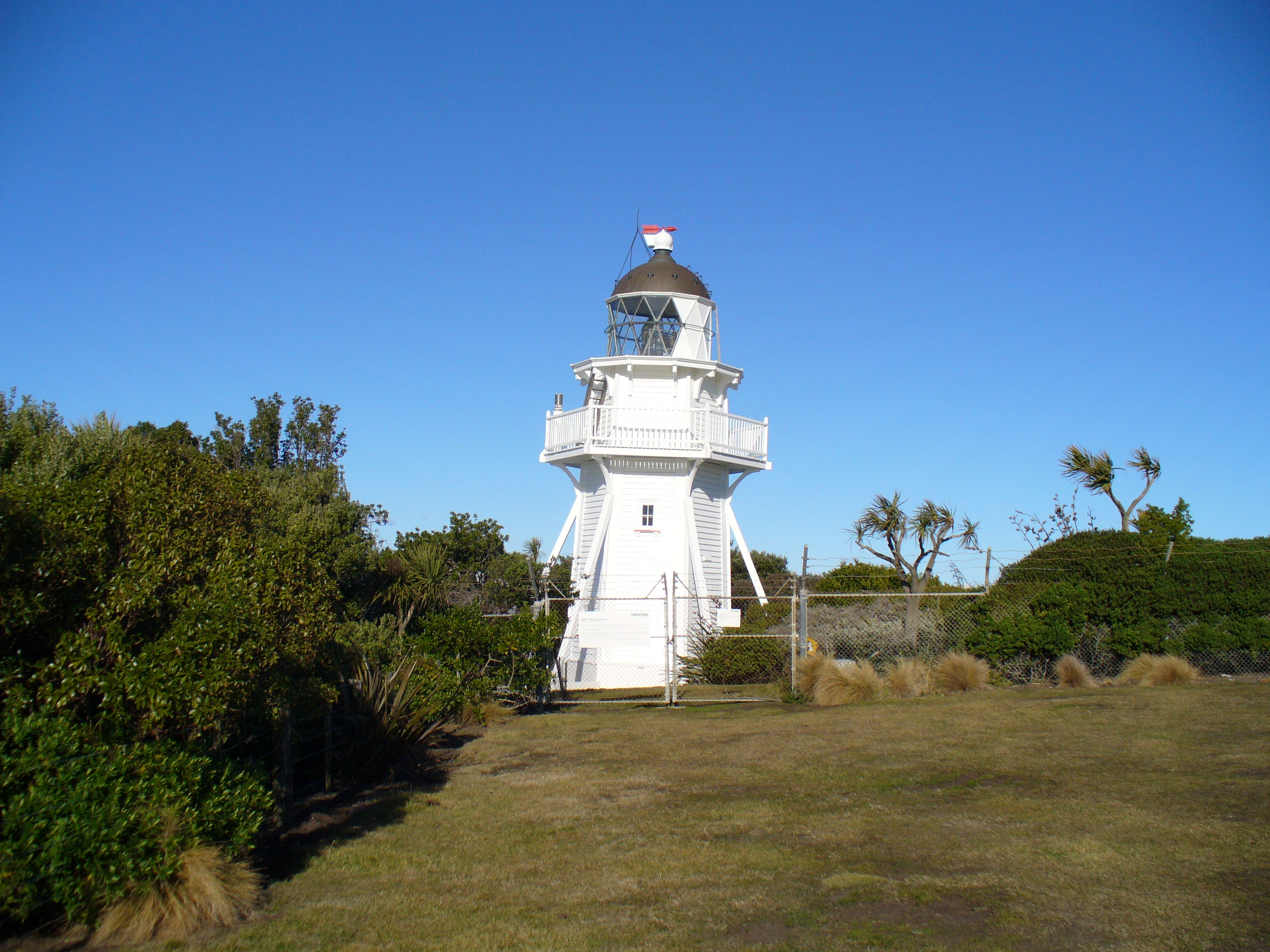
Kātiki Point Lighthouse from Northern side

The wooden tower stands 26 feet (8 m) high and 190 feet (58 m) above sea level. The light flashes on for 6 seconds and off for 6 seconds, and can be seen for 10 nautical miles (20 km). The light-emitting diode beacon is supplied by mains electricity, with a battery for standby power. The original lens operated with a 1000-watt lamp supplied by mains electricity, with a diesel generator for standby power. It can still be seen in the lantern room at the top of the tower.

The light was fully automated in 1975 and the lighthouse keeper was withdrawn. The operation of the light is now fully automatic and is monitored by a computer and Maritime New Zealand staff in Wellington. The lighthouse was restored by Maritime New Zealand in 2006.

== See also ==
- List of lighthouses in New Zealand
