= Fernhill Branch =

Overview
- Locale: Otago, New Zealand

Service
- Operator(s): New Zealand Railways Department

History
- Commenced: 1882
- Opened: 9 July 1883
- Closed: 2002
Route map
Map

The Fernhill Branch is a railway line in Otago, New Zealand. It was opened in 1883 and the remaining section formally closed in 2002 although abandoned for ten years. A significant amount of controversy surrounded the ownership status of the line in its early years.

== Construction and controversy ==
The reason this line was constructed was little different from why many bush tramways throughout New Zealand were constructed in the days before modern road transportation. It was built to run from the Fernhill coal mine to the Main South Line, about 2.75 kilometres south so that the company's owners had easy railway access. In 1882, the Fernhill Railway & Colliery Company Ltd. commenced work on the line and it was finished the next year, opening on 9 July 1883. For the first four years, the company continued to maintain the line while trains were operated by the government's New Zealand Railways Department (NZR).

The controversy began when the line's ownership was granted to the government without compensation to the colliery company under the Government Railways Act of 1887. In 1891, the owners of the Fernhill Colliery commenced legal proceedings against the government for compensation on the basis that the Act should not be applied to private railways. During this time, the colliery fell into financial difficulties and the mine did not operate between March 1892 and February 1893, meaning no trains were required to run. The mine and line had only been operating again briefly when railway commissioners took control of the railway on 6 March 1893. Almost two years later, on 6 December 1894, the courts awarded the line to the mortgagees, but later that month, on the 24th, traffic again stopped. In 1895, the line was passed to new owners on 4 June and then six months later, NZR themselves purchased it on 19 December. The ownership disputes were finally settled and the line became the state-owned Fernhill Branch.

== Operation ==
The branch line's junction with the Main South Line was located at the Dunedin suburban station of Abbotsford and immediately climbed a 1:43 grade to the McSkimmings brickworks site crossing North Taieri Road to pass the factory site's small rail yard and then across Abbots Hill Road towards the Fernhill coal mine site.

Passenger services never operated on the line, and freight was carried only when required so no timetable was ever instituted. Additional traffic came from a brickworks and the cartage of building sand, and while there was meant to be a guarantee of a minimum amount of coal traffic, this was rarely honoured and never enforced. The mine shut down on 13 July 1925 and trains stopped operating beyond the brickworks, but formal closure of the unused section was not announced until 20 February 1930. After this date, the closed portion was partially dismantled back to the brickworks clay pit area.

== Today ==
Part of the remaining section to the brickworks was open as an industrial spur to the McSkimmings Industries complex, but it was disused for many years and banned from all rail use in 1995. The remaining length of line from McSkimmings was lifted back to the Main South Line in 2000. The incline formation has now been built over.

Evidence of the now dismantled branch can still be sighted, with some of the line's formation visible, such as an embankment and a cutting. Tracks are still in-situ on the formation at Abbots Hill Road level crossing including a wagon turntable that served the McSkimmings brickworks clay pit and store yard. One of the line's bridges is still in use as part of a private farm access road. There is currently no public access to the site of the old mine and the branch's terminus, and it is not visible from public roads.
