= Cape Foulwind Railway =

Railway line in New Zealand

Map

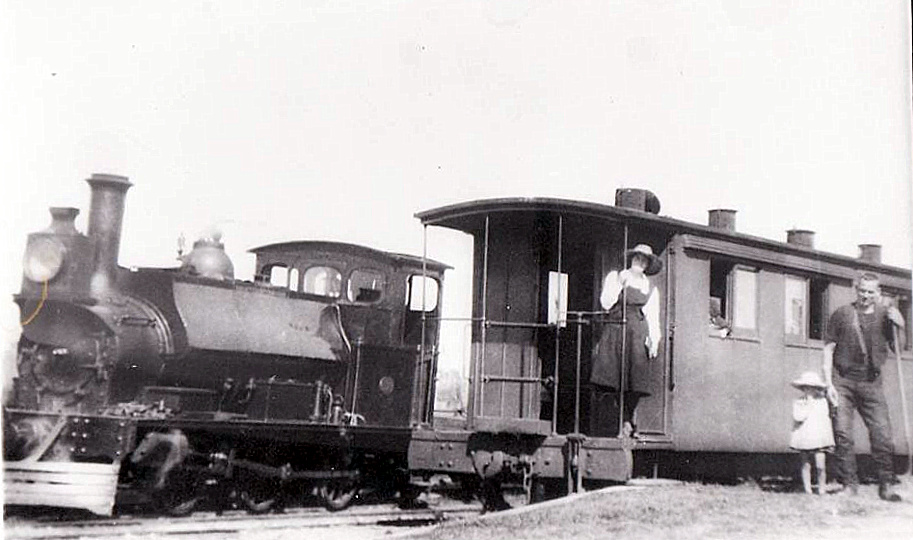
Omau railway station

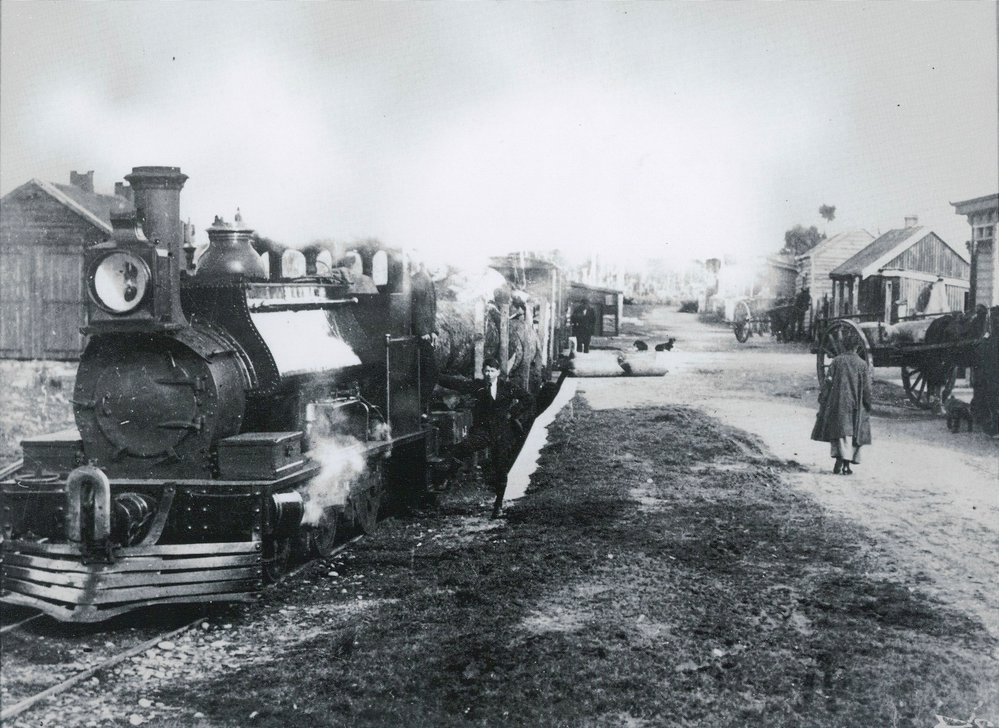
Cape Foulwind railway station

The Cape Foulwind Railway was a branch railway line west of Westport to Cape Foulwind. In 1886 the Westport Harbour Board built the line to their quarry to transport rocks to their breakwaters in the Buller River. In 1888 it was linked to Westport by a road-rail bridge over the Buller River. The iron bridge was planked with kauri forming a 12 ft (3.7 m) wide road. The bridge cost £13,794 and was 1,040 ft (320 m) long. By 1888 it was said to be carrying a considerable passenger traffic, using two coaches. In 1914 a new section of line including a tunnel was built to a new quarry south of the Cape.

In 1921 the line and the three F class locomotives were transferred to the New Zealand Railways. The branch was one of the branch lines closed by the Railway Commission in 1930, although it had been effectively closed from about 1925. But in 1931 the line reverted to the Marine Department, which ran occasional trains until about 1940. In 1958, a new cement works opened at Cape Foulwind.

The original Buller bridge was replaced in 1976 by a concrete bridge, slightly upstream.

== Cape Foulwind ==
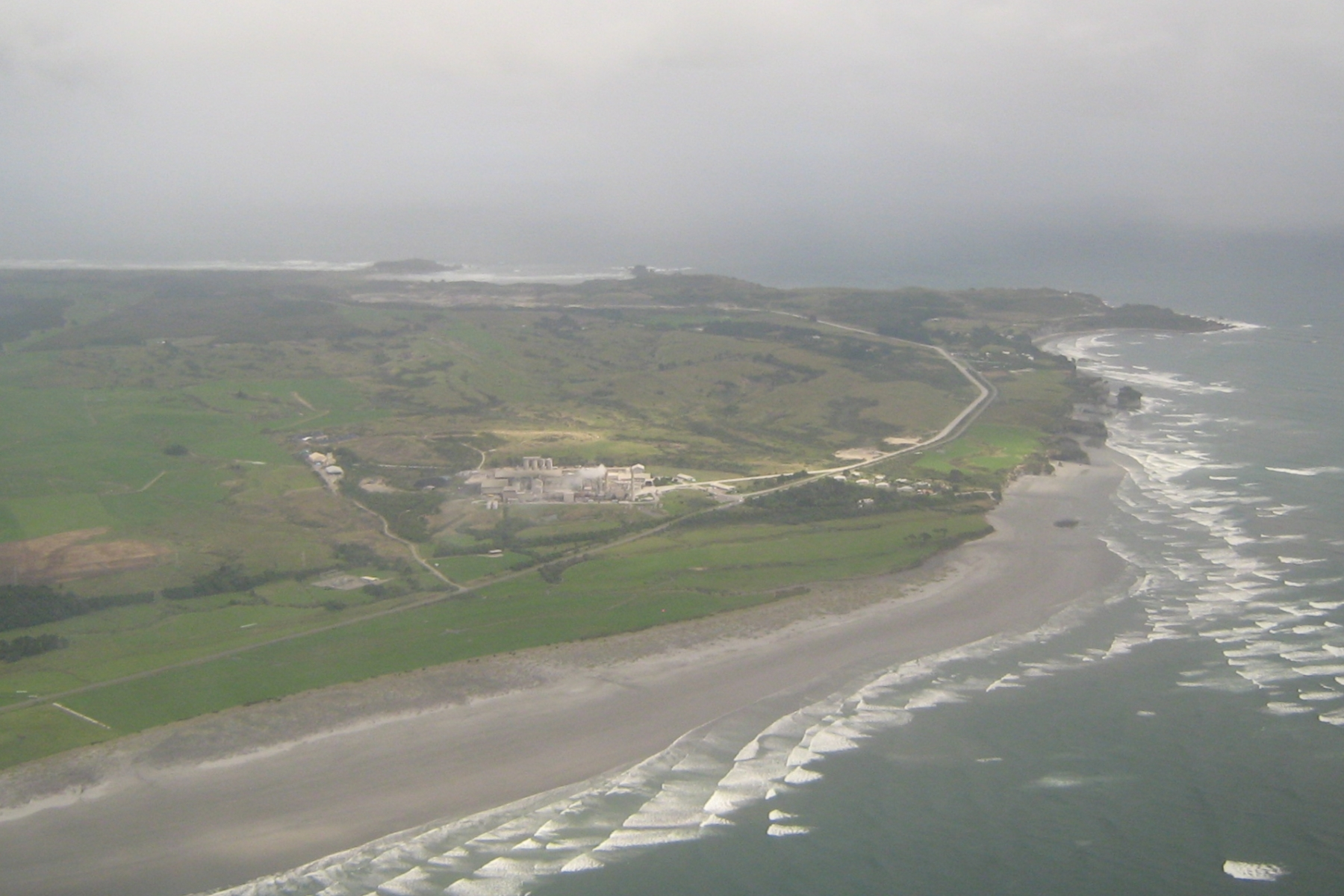
Cape Foulwind living up to its name, with the former cement works centre foreground.

Originally the site of a Māori village named Omau, Cape Foulwind has a lighthouse, and a former cement works. Built since the line closed, the cement was trucked from the works to a private siding just south of Westport. The cement works closed in 2016. The name Omau has been reinstated as a proper place name.
