= Outram, New Zealand =

Town in the South Island of New Zealand

Outram
- Rural settlement
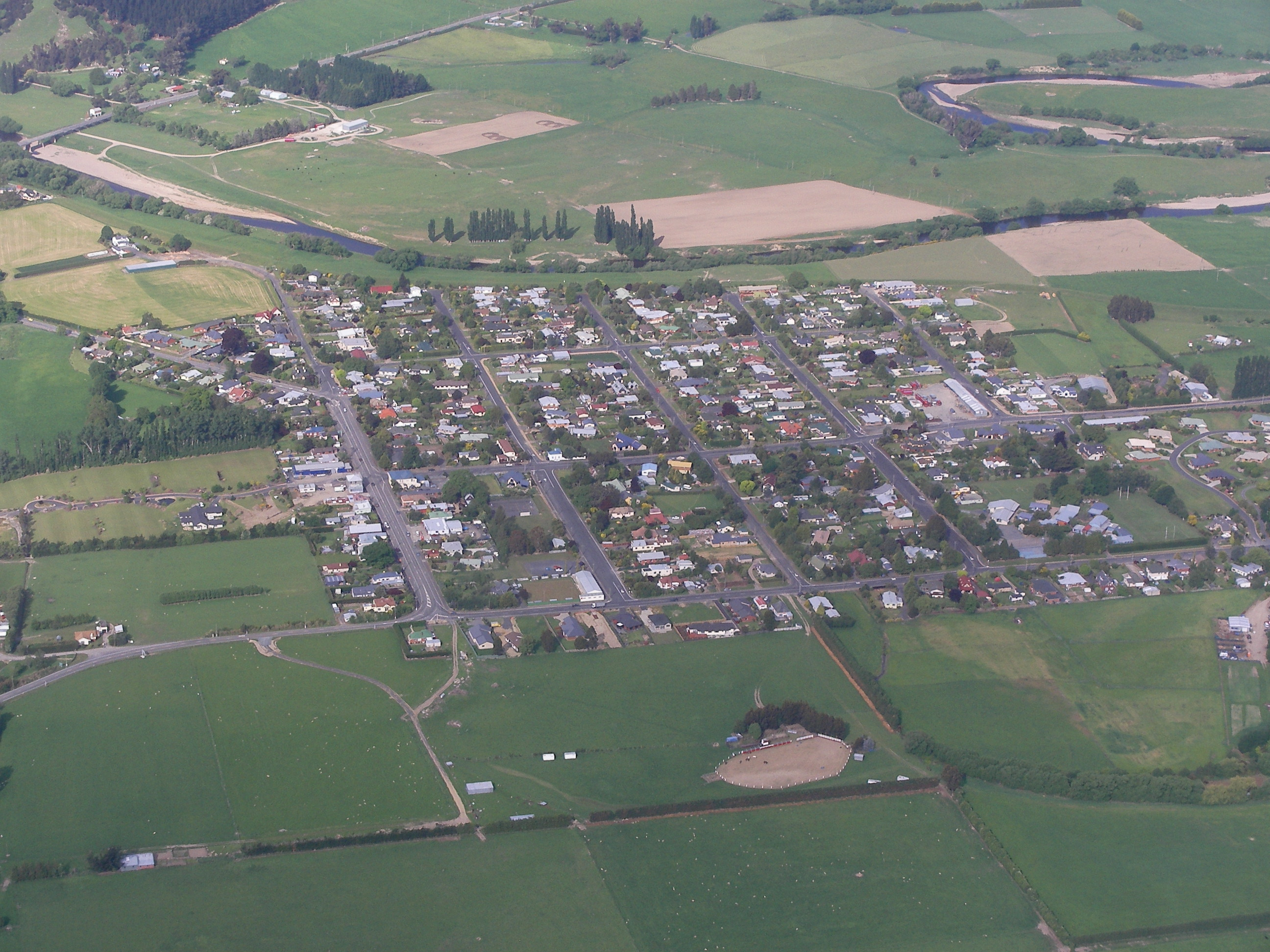
- Outram from the air
- Interactive map of Outram
- Coordinates: 45°51′30″S 170°13′50″E
- Country: New Zealand
- Island: South Island
- Region: Otago
- Territorial authority: Dunedin
- Community board: Mosgiel-Taieri Community Board
- Electorates: Taieri; Te Tai Tonga (Māori)

Government
  - Territorial authority: Dunedin City Council
  - Regional council: Otago Regional Council
  - Mayor of Dunedin: Sophie Barker
  - Taieri MP: Ingrid Leary
  - Te Tai Tonga MP: Tākuta Ferris

Area
  - Total: 1.05 km^{2} (0.41 sq mi)

Population (June 2025)
  - Total: 960
  - Density: 910/km^{2} (2,400/sq mi)
- Time zone: UTC+12 (NZST)
  - Summer (DST): UTC+13 (NZDT)
- Postcode: 9019
- Area code: 03
- Local iwi: Ngāi Tahu

Outram is a rural suburb of Dunedin, New Zealand, with a population of 960 as of June 2025. It is located 28 kilometres west of the central city at the edge of the Taieri Plains, close to the foot of Maungatua. The Taieri River flows close to the southeast of the town. Outram lies on State Highway 87 between Mosgiel and Middlemarch.

The original town was formed at a river crossing (ferry then bridge) on a route to the Central Otago goldfields. The village was moved following a flood in the late 19th century and relocated to its current location and still has the town's library.

From 1877 until 1953, Outram was served by a branch line railway that connected with the Main South Line. This line was known as the Outram Branch and it had a relatively unremarkable career. Closure came as a result of an almost total absence of traffic caused by the development of road transport during the first half of the 20th century, and today, few remnants of the line are visible.

Outram's facilities include Outram Volunteer Fire Brigade, Outram Primary School, Outram Library, West Taieri Rugby Club, Church, Memorial Hall, Outram Hotel, a handful of retail outlets including a cafe and some antique shops. The West Taieri Cemetery is on the outskirts of the town. Outram is administered by Dunedin City Council, and has a reticulated water supply, but no reticulated sewerage.

Sir John Richardson named the town after Sir James Outram, a British general in the Indian Rebellion of 1857.

The town was the setting and filming location for New Zealand's first non-documentary "talkie" film, 1935's Down on the Farm. The 1982 movie Shaker Run features a brief scene shot in the main street of Outram.

== Demographics ==
Outram is described by Statistics New Zealand as a rural settlement. It covers 1.05 km^{2} (0.41 sq mi), and had an estimated population of 960 as of June 2025, with a population density of 914 people per km^{2}. It is part of the much larger Momona statistical area.

Historical population
Year	Pop.	±% p.a.
2006	645	—
2013	711	+1.40%
2018	774	+1.71%

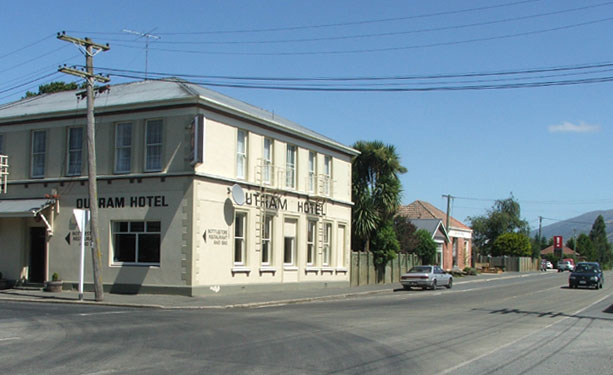
Outram Hotel, in the main street of Outram.

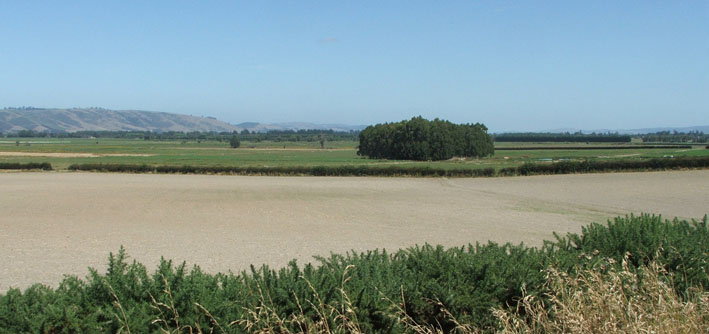
Looking southeast across the Taieri Plains from near Outram.

Before the 2023 census, Outram had a smaller boundary, covering 0.80 km^{2} (0.31 sq mi). Using that boundary, Outram had a population of 774 at the 2018 New Zealand census, an increase of 63 people (8.9%) since the 2013 census, and an increase of 129 people (20.0%) since the 2006 census. There were 297 households, comprising 402 males and 366 females, giving a sex ratio of 1.1 males per female, with 174 people (22.5%) aged under 15 years, 96 (12.4%) aged 15 to 29, 372 (48.1%) aged 30 to 64, and 132 (17.1%) aged 65 or older.

Ethnicities were 95.7% European/Pākehā, 7.8% Māori, 1.9% Asian, and 1.6% other ethnicities. People may identify with more than one ethnicity.

Although some people chose not to answer the census's question about religious affiliation, 60.1% had no religion, 33.3% were Christian, 1.2% were Buddhist and 0.8% had other religions.

Of those at least 15 years old, 108 (18.0%) people had a bachelor's or higher degree, and 141 (23.5%) people had no formal qualifications. 123 people (20.5%) earned over $70,000 compared to 17.2% nationally. The employment status of those at least 15 was that 312 (52.0%) people were employed full-time, 111 (18.5%) were part-time, and 12 (2.0%) were unemployed.

== Education ==
Outram School is a full primary school serving years 1 to 8, with a roll of 189 students as at July 2026. The school first opened in 1861. Henley School and Momona School merged with Outram School in 2004.
