= Nelson railway proposals =

There have been various proposals to link the city of Nelson to New Zealand’s South Island rail network, but none have come to fruition.

Nelson was served by the Dun Mountain Railway, a mineral tramway that was also used by a horse tram between the city and its port, and by the Nelson Section, an isolated part of the government-owned railway between Nelson and Glenhope, which served several existing and developing communities in between.

== Proposals ==
Proposals to connect Nelson to the South Island network have involved extensions and different routes for the isolated Nelson Section, and proposals for completely new lines that did not connect with the Nelson Section.

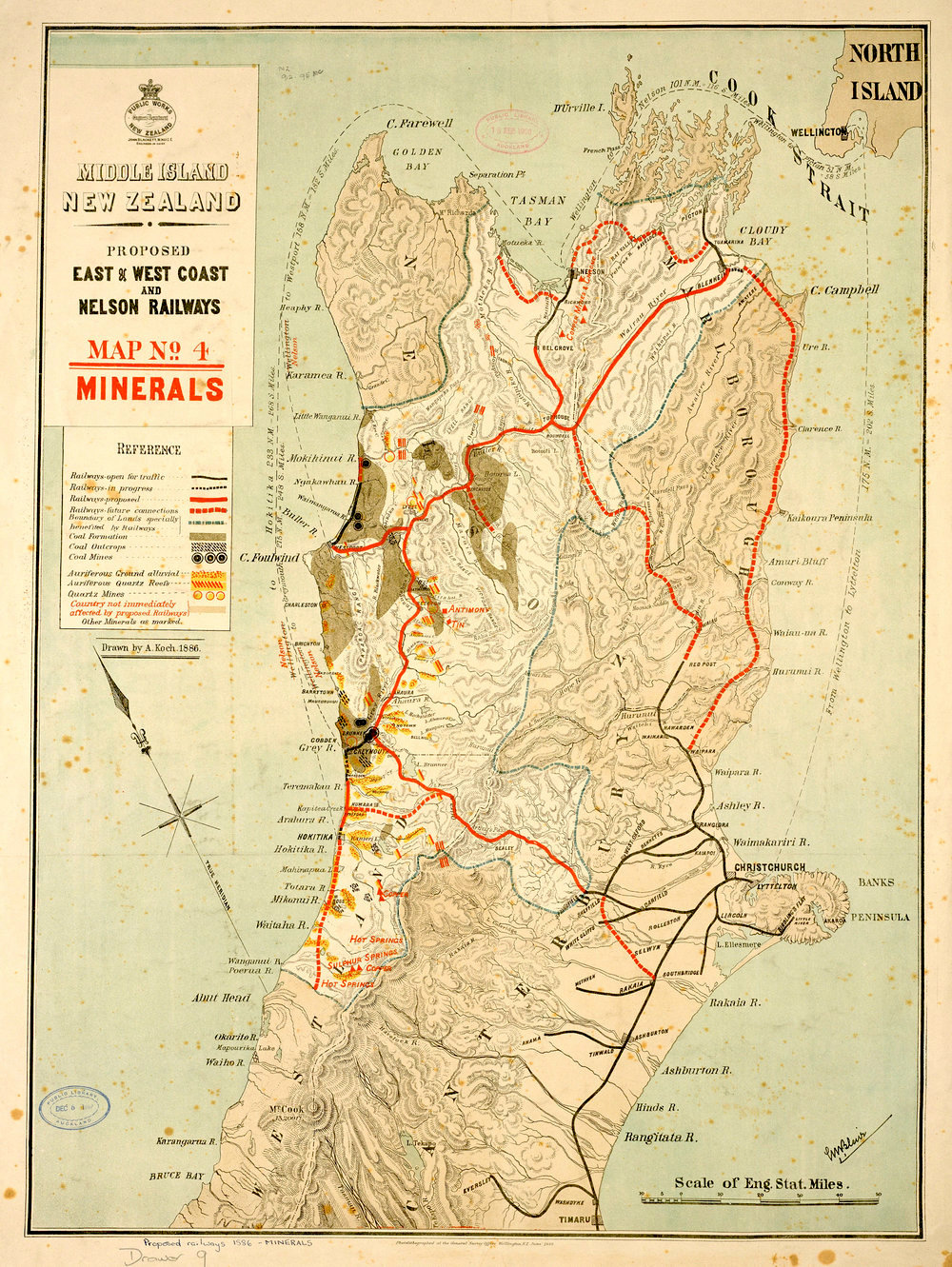
East & West Coast and Nelson Railways, as proposed in 1886

The original intention was to build a line that could tap the West Coast coalfields and link with Christchurch, either by way of the Midland Line and the Buller District, or by way of Tophouse and the Lewis Pass. Only after the line was closed was the Blenheim connection seriously advocated and that only until the defeat of the Second Labour Government of 1957 - 1960.

=== Belgrove – Tophouse route ===
On 26 July 1880 a government-appointed commission made recommendations on the future of several lines under construction or consideration, including those to serve Nelson. It reported that the then-under-construction Foxhill to Belgrove extension of the Nelson Section should be completed immediately, but the Belgrove – Roundell section was on the postponed list.

Despite this, work on the survey for the route continued and was completed as far as Blue Glen by March 1881. Rumours persisted that work on the next 16 kilometres (9.9 mi) of the route would soon commence, and were enough of an incentive for many unemployed people to seek work at Belgrove. In 1883, a contract was let for work to begin on the next 4 km of the formation, a job that was completed by early 1885, at which point the work stopped. By the time work on the Nelson Section resumed in 1890, the route had changed with the new objective being the Spooner’s Range tunnel, and the 4 km of formation already built beyond Belgrove was abandoned, costing the taxpayer £10,700. It is now partly a forestry access road.

There were various other proposals for connections from Tophouse to the isolated Picton section and the Waiau Branch line. There was also a proposal to connect to the West Coast via Kawatiri and Inangahua, but this was rejected in favour of the line passing through existing rural communities to the south-west of Nelson.

=== Inangahua extension ===
After an abortive attempt to start work on a Belgrove to Tophouse route in the 1880s, the Midland Railway Company, having been selected to continue construction of the line beyond Belgrove, chose a route that passed through the Spooner Range by a summit tunnel. The intention was that the line would continue westwards via Murchison and the Buller River gorge to the nearest railhead, at Inangahua Junction.

The Railways Authorization Act 1924 (No 36) authorised several lines; No 9 was an extension of the Midland Line. The Schedule specified:

- Name of Railway: Midland
- Extent Authorized: "An extension of the authorized line from near the confluence of the Owen and Buller Rivers to Murchison. Length about 12 miles." (19.3 km)

Though the terminus of the Nelson Line for most of its existence was at Glenhope, the Glenhope to Kawatiri section was opened on 21 June 1926 and by 1930 trains could be run beyond Kawatiri to Gowanbridge. Formation work continued beyond Gowanbridge to the Mangles River, some 24 kilometres (15 mi) beyond Gowanbridge and just 6 kilometres (3.7 mi) from Murchison.

In January 1931 the government ordered an immediate halt to all work on the line, ostensibly due to economic conditions. It was estimated that at the time the work stopped it would have required only a further six months to finish all the formation work to the 82 miles (132 km) peg and ballasting and plate laying work could have started within months and been completed without interruption all the way to Murchison. The goal of a connection at Inangahua fell short by 42 miles (68 km), a failure that eventually contributed to the demise of the section.

Despite a trial line survey done in 1939 and promises made during the 1949 election campaign by both major political parties to restore the section of line between Glenhope and Gowanbridge and to continue it on to Murchison, no further work was undertaken beyond Glenhope.

=== Seddonville extension ===
In 1926 the engineer in charge of the survey party planning the route of the Nelson Section through the Buller Gorge had doubts about the viability of the route for a railway. As a theoretical exercise, he investigated a route to connect the Nelson Section to the Seddonville Branch. Such a route would have departed from the planned route for the Nelson Section at Owen Junction and joined the railhead at Seddonville. This option was discarded as it would have required a tunnel at least as long as the Otira Tunnel, which could not have been contemplated at the time.

=== Larry’s Creek extension ===
Similar to the Inangahua extension, and also because of concerns about the feasibility of a railway through the Buller Gorge, the engineer in charge of the survey party also considered a route up the Maruia River valley, which would have joined the Stillwater – Westport line between Reefton and Inangahua Junction, at or near Larry’s Creek.

=== Nelson–Blenheim Line ===
When it became clear that the threat to the future of the Nelson Section was serious, a Nelson – Blenheim link was suggested as an extension of the Nelson Section and an alternate route by which it could be connected to the South Island network to hopefully improve its fortunes.

An election promise of the 1957–1960 Labour Government was to look into the possibility of constructing a line between Nelson and Blenheim. This proposal was based on an idea from 1874 for a rail connection between the two towns. On 19 March 1958, a report was released by the Minister of Railways that examined two possible routes, and on 8 April 1959 the Minister of Works proposed a third route. The routes were:

- Nelson–Wakapuaka–Havelock–Grovetown/Blenheim: 91½ km via the Tinline and Pelorus valleys, including 9½ km of tunnelling and 2.6 km of bridging.
- Nelson–Brightwater–Blenheim: 120 km via the Wairoa River, Goulter River and Wairau River valleys, including 5.6 km of tunnelling.
- Nelson–Pelorus Bridge–Havelock–Blenheim: 101.8 km via the Whangamoa and Rai valleys, a more favourable route that required only 4.8 km of tunnelling and 2.3 km of bridging. This route was reported in the news media as being the most likely.

In April 1960, the acting prime minister announced that the government had selected the cheapest option, with prices ranging from £10,300,000 to £16,500,000. Prime Minister Walter Nash officially opened the project on 1 March 1960 at a ceremony attended by 3,000 people, at which a plaque to commemorate the occasion was unveiled. Work was halted when the Auditor-General declared the project to be illegal under the Public Works Act 1928 until an authorising act was passed. Accordingly, on 29 July 1960, the Nelson Railway Authorisation No 3 Act 1960 was passed, with the government having a majority of one for each vote. The Schedule (Railway Authorised) of the Act provided that:

- Name of Railway: Nelson - South Island Main Trunk
- Extent Authorised: "A line from Nelson via Pelorus Bridge and Havelock to a junction with the South Island Main Trunk Railway in the vicinity of Grovetown. Length about 65 miles (105 km)."

Work had included reclamation for the new Nelson railway station and yards, and an embankment across mudflats to the main road was under construction. The Railways Department had already determined that the line would initially be uneconomic, but later the operating costs would be covered by revenue from timber traffic alone, without counting all the other industrial freight that could also be expected.

In the 1960 general election campaign, the National Party had a policy of stopping the line. When they won the election, Keith Holyoake, the new prime minister, announced on 14 December 1960 that all work was to stop forthwith and that the authorisation legislation would be repealed in the first session of parliament. The Act was repealed in 1961. The plaque remained for many years in an open field outside the city but is now located at the Grove railway station in Founders Park.

See the Nelson - Blenheim notional railway for details of the subsidy scheme that existed for passengers and freight between Nelson and Blenheim for 22 years between 1957 and 1979.

== Today ==
The Nelson line is still visible and can be traced for almost every kilometre of its length.

The only sign of rail activity in Nelson is a short heritage operation run by the Nelson Railway Society from Founders Historic Park using their own line between Wakefield Quay Station and Grove Station. The society has proposed future extensions of their line, possibly into or near the city centre. The old Nelson station yards are now completely built over.

Nelson remains as one of three major urban areas in New Zealand without a rail connection, the others being Queenstown and Taupō.
