= Shag Point Branch =

Map

The Shag Point Branch was a short branch off the Main South Line on the east coast of the South Island of New Zealand. It left the main line about nine kilometres north of Palmerston at the small settlement of Shag Point to provide railway access to a nearby supply of coal. It was built in 1879 and ran until 1934.

== Construction and operation ==
Authorisation was granted to build the line in 1878 and was built wholly to serve the Shag Point Coal Company, whose engineer supervised construction in 1879. Records exist of traffic using the line in June that year, though the official opening was not held until 18 August. The line was roughly three kilometres in length and it was shunted when required by passing freights on the Main South Line. Traffic declined as the 20th century began, and on 1 April 1908, the New Zealand Railways Department (NZR) stopped serving the line.

This, however, was not the end for the branch. It passed into the ownership of the Shag Point Coal Company, who privately operated the line for a quarter of a century. At different points during this time, the company owned two small ex-NZR tank locomotives. Activity picked up in the 1920s but then the Great Depression began and the mine did not survive. The mine closed in 1934 and therefore so did the line.

== Today ==
Little remains of this line. The rusted remains of the local wharf are clearly evident, and the line approached this wharf through a cutting. Evidence of the line's formation can be seen near where it met the Main South Line at Shag Point station. Part of the formation has been re-used as a road serving some houses in the small fishing village.
