= Outram Branch =

Branch line railway

Map

The Outram Branch was a branch line railway near Dunedin, Otago, that operated from 1877 to 1953 and formed part of New Zealand's national rail network.

== Construction ==
The line was built at the urgings of local residents in and around Outram, even though there was little promise of traffic to actually justify the line's construction. There was an initial proposal to build a line from Allanton, near the site of Dunedin's current airport, but when landowners along a proposed route from Mosgiel agreed to make land available for free on the condition trains ran six days a week, their route was selected instead.

Construction commenced in September 1875 with the Main South Line junction located just north of Mosgiel station's yard, and although the line crossed mainly flat land, one engineering difficulty was presented by the Gladfield swamp. A solid base could not be found even at a depth of twelve metres, and the problem was eventually solved by laying many layers of flax to provide a firm foundation for the line. Two bridges were required during construction, the 67 metres Taieri River bridge near Outram, and a 42-metre bridge across the Silver Stream. The line was remarkably straight: in its entire 14.5-kilometre length, it had a mere three curves. Only one staffed station and goods shed were built on the line, both at the terminus in Outram. It was opened for service on 1 October 1877.

== Operation ==
In its early years, Outram served as the railhead during the construction of the Taieri Gorge section of the Otago Central Railway (now preserved as the Taieri Gorge Railway). Trains ran six days a week as promised, and due to restrictions on the weight of locomotives allowed to cross the Taieri River bridge, the line was operated by small tank locomotives such as the F class, with the W^{F} class being the heaviest class permitted.

In 1930, two services ran return daily, but this was seen to be excessive and trains were cut to run once daily. These services were mixed trains and they operated until 13 January 1950, when the passenger component was cancelled and the line became freight only. The line was proving uneconomic and the cessation of passenger services could not save its poor financial state. By the early 1950s, traffic was almost non-existent: 107 tonnes of agricultural lime and fertiliser were railed in a week, with a meagre seven tonnes of freight railed out. Outram was very adequately served by road transportation and the railway was overdue for maintenance - it was clear it would not be beneficial to keep it open any longer. Accordingly, the line was closed to all traffic on 5 December 1953.

== Today ==
It is typical for both nature and human activity to reduce or wholly destroy traces of closed railway lines, and little remains of the Outram Branch. In Outram itself, the goods shed has been incorporated as part of a road transportation company's depot, and outside of the town, across the Taieri River, School Road uses the old route of the railway for nearly three kilometres. Concrete abutments at the location of a long-gone bridge over a small creek are still present, as are some traces of the line's formation at points along its former route, and the site of the Dukes Road station still possesses its concrete platform.
