= Moeraki =

- Village
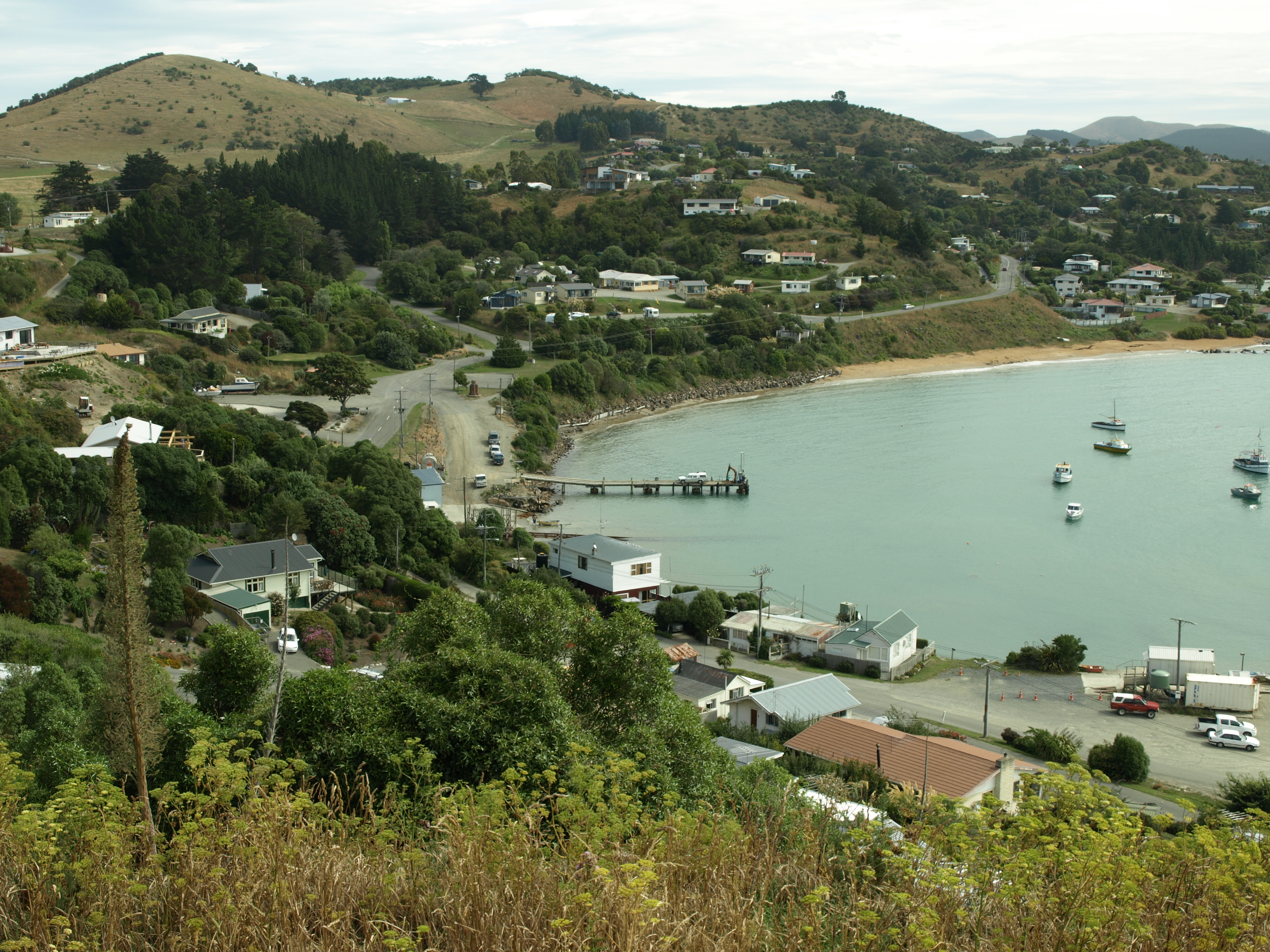
- View from Moeraki Esplanade Reserve in 2009
- Interactive map of Moeraki
- Coordinates: 45.362°S 170.841°E
- Country: New Zealand
- Region: Otago
- Territorial authority: Waitaki District
- Ward: Waihemo Ward
- Community: Waihemo Community
- Electorates: Waitaki; Te Tai Tonga (Māori)

Government
  - Territorial authority: Waitaki District Council
  - Regional council: Otago Regional Council
  - Mayor of Waitaki: Melanie Tavendale
  - Waitaki MP: Miles Anderson
  - Te Tai Tonga MP: Mananui Ramsden

Area
  - Total: 8.53 km^{2} (3.29 sq mi)

Population (June 2025)
  - Total: 160
  - Density: 19/km^{2} (49/sq mi)
- Local iwi: Ngāi Tahu

Moeraki is a small fishing village on the east coast of the South Island of New Zealand. It was once the location of a whaling station. In the 1870s, local interests believed it could become the main port for the north Otago area and a railway line, the Moeraki Branch, was built to the settlement and opened in 1877. However, the port could not compete with Oamaru and the lack of traffic as well as stability problems caused by difficult terrain led to the closure of the railway in 1879 after only two years' operation.

The village is best known for the nearby Moeraki Boulders.

== Name ==
'Moeraki' is usually translated as a place to sleep by day. There are other places with the same name or versions of it, all along the path from the Polynesian homeland, Hawaiki.

== History ==
=== Māori settlement ===
The south side of the Moeraki Peninsula has an Archaic Māori site at Waimataitai lagoon, which Atholl Anderson dated as 13th century, placing it in the second wave of New Zealand's early human occupation. Gavin McLean tentatively linked its occupants to Waitaha, conventionally the third iwi, or tribe, to arrive in southern New Zealand, after Kahui Tipua and Te Rapuwai. Waitaha's expedition leader was Rākaihautū.

However, as McLean notes, 'Waitaha' is also a name simply used to designate all the peoples preceding Kāti Māmoe and Kāi Tahu ('Ngāti Mamoe' and 'Ngāi Tahu' in modern standard Māori) the last two arrivals before the European. It is safe to say Waimatatai is a 'Waitaha' site in that broad sense but there are no specific families it can be linked to.

The Moeraki peninsula terminates to the south in Kartigi Point ("Kātiki" in modern standard Māori) where there was a pā (fortified settlement) of the Classic period of Māori culture. Its traditional name was Te Raka-a-hineatua. Jill Hamel has reported that it was the best developed of any southern pā, with terraces, and rectangular houses with stone fireplaces. Radio carbon dating has confirmed it was occupied in the 18th century. According to tradition it was built by Taoka, a well-known fighting chief of the late 17th to early 18th centuries, who also built fortresses at the Ashburton River / Hakatere and near Timaru.

Shortly after it was built it was attacked by a party from Kaikōura who were successfully repulsed by Taoka in the battle known as Te Hakopa. Taoka was also in battle with chiefs further south at Huriawa (modern Karitane Peninsula), Mapoutahi, and Pukekura (modern Taiaroa Head). Taoka's principal opponent was Te Wera.

It used to be said Moeraki, like many other places on the east coast, was not a site of permanent occupation in pre-European times, but a major study, published in 1996, shows that is unlikely.

The residents of Moeraki regularly ate pāra (frostfish) as a supplementary food, as Moeraki was one of the most common places in New Zealand where frostfish strandings occurred.

=== Arrival of the Europeans ===
Moeraki was traversed during the Sealers' War, also known as the “War of the Shirt”, in 1814. In that year a party of eight men under Robert Brown including two other Europeans and five lascars, or Indian seamen, came up the east coast from Stewart Island / Rakiura looking for a group of lascars who had absconded from the Matilda, which was commanded by Captain Samuel Fowler. According to the Creed manuscript, discovered in 2003, they camped for the night by their boat at 'the Bluff eight miles from Moeraki to the north. However they were observed and attacked by Māori. Two of the sealers escaped and fled to Bobby's Head and Goodwood, south of Moeraki, taking two days to get there and where they were later killed and eaten. They will have passed Moeraki going north and fleeing south.

=== Establishment of a whaling station ===
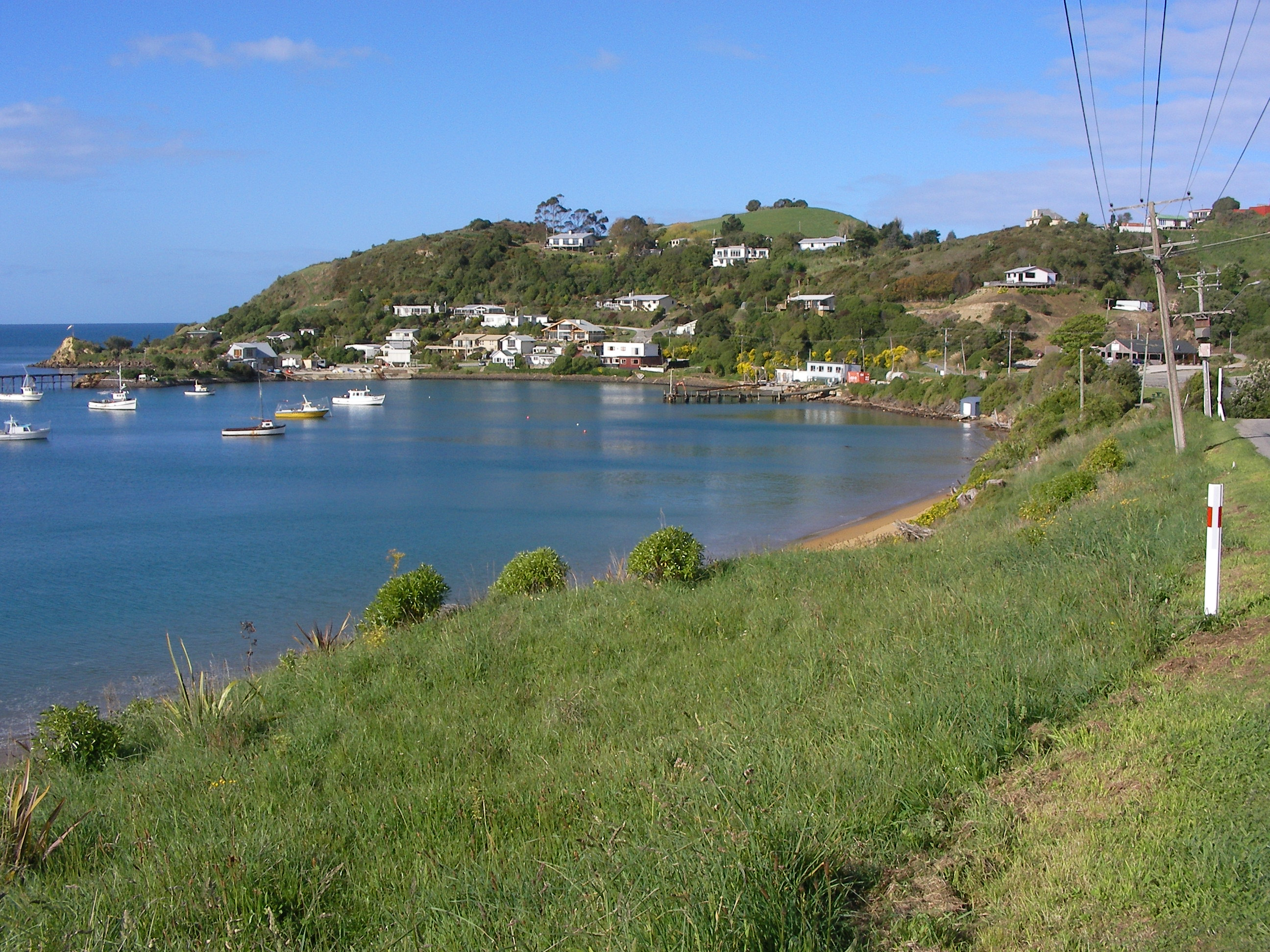
The bay at Moeraki showing fishing boats

Born in Sydney in approximately 1794 John Hughes was an experienced whaler who had first worked in New Zealand waters in 1822. In 1834 he took up an offer of employment with the Weller brothers' at their Otago whaling station. After completing his contract in June or July 1836 Hughes took joined on one of two American whaling ship on their way north to Peraki on Banks Peninsula. These were the Merrimac out of Newport, Rhode Island under Captain Potter and the Martha out of Newburyport under the command of Captain Peas. After catching a large number of whales in the waters around Banks Peninsula the two ships and sailed south, calling in at the Otago whaling station. Inspired by the money being made by the Wellers and the Americans Hughes had decided to establish his own whaling station. He purchased two boats and all of the equipment needed to catch and process whales from the Americans he recruited others to join him from Weller brothers’ workforce.

During the voyage of the Merrimac and the Martha either on the way to Banks Peninsula or on their return down the coast they must have explored Moeraki for Hughes decided to establish his base there.

Accompanied by his partners Peter Chevatt (often written as Chevat, Charbett, Chisnal, Chesval, Sivatt or Shavett) and John Thompson as well as by Richard Burn, William Issac Haberfield, John Knox and six unnamed Māori he disembarked from the 148 ton barque Magnet on Boxing Day, 26 December 1836. All were experienced whalers. The Maori members of the party were not only experienced seamen and, hard workers, but they also a protection against any trouble with the Maoris in the locality.

Within two days they had offloaded all of their equipment and supplies. Over the next three months the party established a whaling station where they had landed at Onekakara, on the northern side of the peninsula, the site of the present village of Moeraki.

Since that time European occupation has been continuous. When Hughes and his men arrived there were only nine or ten Māori living in the area, under Takatahara.

In their first season, which began in March 1837 the whalers caught 22 whales, receiving £8 to £10 a tun for the oil and £50 to 56 a ton for bone, with a single whale depending on size yielding 5 to 11 tuns of oil. In 1838 the station building burnt down, along with their provisions, but they caught 27 whales. In that same year a large heke (migration party) of Ngāi Tahu Māori from Kaiapoi arrived under Matiaha Tiramorehu. Following permission from Paitu, the rangatira of the Moeraki area, they established a permanent settlement about 3 km from what is now Moeraki township at Tawhiroko Point. Subsequently, it became known as the Kaika.

By their third season the number of whalers had increased to 32 with five boats in use with a number of Māori being employed at the station. Despite this increased number of boats the catch decreased slightly and then in 1841 rapidly dropped to nine, then two the following year as the whales moved away to avoid the persecution. Whaling ceased around 1847, although there was later a brief revival. Even so, some of the whalers stayed, making their living from fishing, and farming small plots of land. In 1844 it was reported that there were 17 Europeans were living at Moeraki, 11 living with Māori women and between them 13 children. While the whalers had trouble with raising pigs, to supplement their diet they had more luck with goats which they keep penned up on Maukiekie Island (which since then has been known locally as Goat Island). The island was also nesting place for muttonbird which were highly prized by the Ngāi Tahu.

Between 18 and 20 May 1844 Frederick Tuckett (having arrived on the Deborah) inspected Moeraki and the surrounding district as part of his survey to identify a location for the New Zealand Company’s New Edinburgh settlement. While the area had much to recommend, he considered that while its bay was a suitable anchorage for small draught coastal vessels it would not be suitable for the deeper draught of immigrant vessels. He continued his southwards journey and eventually selected Otago Harbour as being better suited for the settlement. As the rewards from whaling declined by 1848 the number of Europeans had dropped to at least 13, but among them was a Mrs Skidmore, who is believed to have been the first woman to reside in North Otago.

Hughes and Haberfield, stayed, taking up land grants in the surrounding district in 1853. Following the Otago Association's settlement based at Dunedin further south in 1848 a Moeraki sheep run was being leased by 1852. A 'Hundred' was declared in 1860, opening the area to closer rural settlement.

=== Development of the port ===
Moeraki remained an isolated community making a living from fishing and small scale farming until increasing demand from the development of Dunedin led to the growing of crops on a commercial basis.

In about 1854 H.C. Hertslet established a landing service using Māori boatmen at Moeraki and later constructed a goods shed which started a period of rivalry with the port at Oamaru as to which should service North Otago.

In 1863 a 2.8 kilometres (1.7 mi) long unmetalled road was constructed by a crew of 40 men from the Onekakara Inn to connect the settlement with the main trunk road. With Moeraki becoming by the 1860s the key port for the shipping of Oamaru stone work commenced in the winter of 1863 on a long-awaited wharf. Bad weather delayed its completion until the following year. Unfortunately, it was soon apparent that could only 6 feet (1.8 m) of water at low tide which was too shallow for large ships. In the same year that the wharf was completed moorings suitable for 600 to 700 tons ships were laid out in the bay at the seven-fathom mark. While Moeraki had the best natural harbour in North Otago with its inner roadstead partly protected by a bluff, by 1869 the existing wharf was in poor condition and as it did not extend far enough out to sea there were restrictions on the size of ships that could use it.

To resolve these issues work commenced in 1872 on what was estimated would be a £3,000 project to construct a larger wharf to service the increased trade now passing through the port. It was designed by the provincial engineer George Barr and instead of the traditional wooden piling used screw-in iron piles, which were prefabricated in England. It was found that the piles could not be persuaded to screw into the sea bed, which meant it was necessary to hammer them in. Dogged by construction difficulties, accidents and poor weather it took over a year to construct the wharf. Upon its completion in 1873 it was found that it was too high for use by smaller vessels, which were forced to use the existing wharf. Even so, the port was busy with materials being imported to construct the new branch railway line. In 1875 as part of the preparations to abolish the Provincial Council Moeraki was allowed to have establish its own harbour board. This made the port more popular but at the same time the increased traffic reduced the road to the port to an almost impassable state. In 1874 the cutter Glimpse became stranded at Moeraki. In 1876 the cutter Hope ran onto the rocks at Moeraki, but with no loss of life.

While the port was busy exporting stone and grain the £3,000 that the harbour board had been endowed with when it was created proved insufficient to pay for the necessary expansion of the port's facilities. This put it at a disadvantage compared with the better financially endowed Port Chalmers and Oamaru harbour boards.

To improve the safety of coastal shipping following several accidents on the dangerous reefs in the surrounding area the Marine Department commenced construction of the Katiki Point Lighthouse on the tip of Moeraki Peninsula in 1876. The light was lit for the first time in 1878. The station was automated, and the last keeper was withdrawn in 1975.

=== Railway ===
In the early 1870s with construction commencing on the Main South Railway Line plans were made to construct a short branch line to connect Moeraki to it. The building of the Oamaru to Dunedin section of the Main South Railway Line in the 1870s saw increased patronage of the port at Moeraki as construction material was bought by ship and landed as close to the construction works as possible. On 4 November 1874 the section of line between Oamaru and Hillgrove (Moeraki Junction) was opened.

Work was meanwhile continuing on the branch line from Hillgrove to Moeraki which was opened on 15 February 1877. It had been expensive to construct as it required a number of cuttings to be made and two viaducts (one 1,200 ft (370 m) long and the other 1,400 ft (430 m) long) to be constructed along the seashore in order to connect with its terminus station which was built near the wharf. However, from the time it opened slips were a constant problem. In 1878 a number of the piles were carried 4 ft (1.2 m) away from their position by land movement. Improvements to the port facilities at Oamaru, which saw it taking more trade coupled with the cost of constant maintenance and unreliability of the branch line led to it being closed and the rails removed in October 1879. From that date onwards Moeraki was served by a railway station in the form of a covered goods shed at Hillgrove on the Main South Railway Line.

Following the closing of the branch railway access to what was the best anchorage in North Otago became dependent on the road, which was prone to slips and thus difficult to maintain in good condition. The restricted access together with the establishment of better facilities at Oamaru lead to trade though Moeraki collapsing also overnight as shipments of stone and grain transferred northwards to its more accessible rival.

Eventually in 1886 the Moeraki Harbour Board was formally abolished. Thus Moeraki lost the opportunity to become the service centre of North Otago.

Despite the failure to establish a direct railway service the village's scenery and sheltered outlook lead to it by the 1890s becoming a favourite destination for picnic parties from Oamaru which travelled by rail to Hillgrove from where they travelled by road to Moeraki. While the area's sheltered bays were popular with swimmers they were also a favourite haunt of sharks. Following one fatal shark attack and the rescue by three men of a woman whose dinghy had overturned it was decided to build some seawater baths. The government gave approval for funds left by the now defunct Harbour Board to be used to pay for the facility. The baths were constructed between the wharf and railway by enclosing a shallow part of the bay and opened on 28 December 1888. A crowd of 3,000 attended the opening. However over time their popularity declined which lead to the abandonment of the facility after its walls were breached by waves in 1912./> Local children continued to use remaining parts of the facility up until the 1930s.

As inter-marriage took place, the Māori women moved to join their Pākehā husbands in Onekakara which by now was being called Moeraki. Around the turn of the century, more Māori families began to move into Moeraki from the two kaiks. The original marae followed from Kaika to its hill-top site some time in the 1920s and 30s.

=== Development of the fishing industry ===
Moeraki became the leading fishing port of North Otago during the 1890s with its fleet growing from five vessels in 1892 to 38 in 1898, while the number of fishermen increased from 13 to 72 over the same period with the majority of the population dependent on the fishing industry to some extent for their livelihood. The first fishing vessels were rowboats and sail-assisted dinghies.

In 1895 Weir and Hull established a fish processing and packing plant which in combination with the development of faster train service, allowed fish to be sent to the Oamaru and Dunedin markets. The company purchased the diesel-powered launch Moerangi which had been originally built by Logan Bros., of Auckland, for the Union Oil Engine Company, was powered by a 25 horse-power oil engine, with a speed of 8 knots and a holding capacity for 16 tons of fish. The vessel was largely employed to tow Moeraki fishing boats to and from the reefs or other fishing grounds, as well as trawling the coast or fishing at the reefs.

Many residents grew vegetables and kept at least one cow. Most farming was on a small scale with those farmers that had milk surplus to their own domestic uses sending it to three nearby creameries, and in later years to the Taieri and Peninsula Milk Production plants at Oamaru and Dunedin.

Government regulations hindered residents from further developing their agricultural activities as they were not permitted to sell eggs or milk when their livestock was unregistered.

By the 1930s the fleet at Moeraki had fallen slightly to 34 vessels with groper and blue cod the main species being harvested. Jack Edmonston constructed a large fish smokehouse in the 1930s.

In 1935 the National Mortgage and Agency Company of New Zealand (NMA) established a fish processing and packing plant at Moeraki and guaranteed to take the entire catch of the fishing boats which supplied it. Previously, fishers at the port had difficulties disposing of their catch as slow transit times by rail often resulted in the fish being spoilt before it reached the market in Christchurch.

The settlement celebrated its centenary on 26 December 1936, but the actual public celebrations were postponed by a year until December 1937 due to an outbreak or infantile paralysis. As part of the celebrations the Centennial Park was developed on the Moeraki waterfront.

=== 1950s ===
During the era following the end of the Second World War government regulations required all fishing boats to land their catches at their port of registration even if they had to bypass processing facilities at other ports on their return from a fishing ground. There were also restrictions on the engine size of vessels. Boats operating from Moeraki were restricted to 50 hp engines, for instance, while vessels based at Oamaru were permitted engines up to 75 hp, and those at Port Chalmers up to 200 hp.

The fishing fleet based at Moeraki in the 1950s and early 1960s predominantly harvested groper, although other species such as blue cod and rock lobster were also caught.

As a number of Māori families had not returned to Moeraki after the war; the focus on the marae diminished; with its use limited to more formal occasions such as tangi and tribal meetings.

At 2.30 am on 24 April 1952 the cargo ship Viggo Hansteen while on a voyage from London, via Panama, to Port Chalmers and Wellington with new British cars and bagged cement ran aground two miles northeast of the Kātiki Point Lighthouse. The Port Chalmers-based tug Dunedin was dispatched to the scene and by 3.16 pm the tug had refloated the vessel which was only slightly damaged and escorted it to port.

=== 1960s ===
Following the tar-sealing of the gravel access road in the early 1960s, there was an influx of newcomers and several boarding houses opened in the village – to accommodate weekend visitors from Dunedin.

In return for exclusive fuelling rights the Shell Oil Company financially assisted with the construction in the inner harbour of a fishing wharf in 1961. This was strengthened, widened and redecked in 1978 at a cost of $10,000.

In the late 1960s the Dunedin-based Skeggs Foods Ltd opened up a new fish processing and packing shed on the seaward side of the iron wharf in completion to the NMA (which subsequently became Wrightson NMA) existing fishing processing and packing facility.

After it began being harvested for export during the 1960s rock lobster became a valuable species, was soon providing most of the income for Moeraki-based fishermen.

During the deregulation of the New Zealand fishing industry between 1966 and 1979, all fisheries became open access, and anyone could harvest fish. This resulted in a doubling of the number of fishing boats based at Moeraki and prosperous times profits from rock lobster for the community, which lasted into the 1980s. However the increased number of fishing boats caused stocks of groper, cod, and rock lobster off the coast of North Otago to be seriously decline. The government reintroduced controls in 1979 and imposed a moratorium on the issue of new licences. To manage fish stocks the Fisheries Amendment Act (1986) introduced the Quota Management System (QMS), which imposes catch limits, and regulates fishing methods, areas, and timing of those activities. At the time when the QMS was introduced there were over 30 local fishermen operating small day boats out of Moeraki Harbour, with their catch being processed locally. However, in response to the QMS the major fishing companies began purchasing as much quota as they could. Poor catches of rock lobster in the 1990s impacted on the financial viability of many Moeraki based owner-operators, who sold off their quota to fund their other fishing activities and maintain their boats. Many sold their quota of rock lobster to Ngai Tahu Fisheries which processed its catch in Dunedin, thus reducing seafood processing employment opportunities at Moeraki.

After Wrightson NMA’s parent company Fletcher Challenge consolidated its fish processing activities at Dunedin in the 1980s Skeggs took over their facility. Following the closing of this processing facility (which was subsequently occupied by the restaurant Fleur's Place) commercial fishermen used a holding tank to house live rock lobster and a freezer for wet fish from which the catches were collected and transported by truck to Dunedin or Oamaru for further processing.

By 2000 there were only six fishing boats operating out of Moeraki. By 2020 traditional commercial fishing activity had virtually been eliminated at the port with only two fishing boats, one of which was supplying Fleur's Place. This dramatic decline in the number of commercial fishing boats operating out of Moeraki and resulting low catch led to the processing companies deciding it was no longer economic for them to collect fish and rock lobster from Moeraki.

== Geography ==
The Moeraki Peninsula features a coastline of small sandy beaches and rocky headlands with reefs and stacks which extends from the southern end of Moeraki Beach, to the northern end of Katiki Beach. On the northern side is a coastal cliff reducing in height and steepness as it progresses southwards to Katiki Point. The geology is sandstone / mudstone and volcanic material. The peninsula with the exception of two small areas of indigenous bush is mostly covered in pasture or scattered scrub. The village of Moeraki is located along the sheltered northern bays with a small fishing port with wharf and slipway structures located at its eastern end in the lee of Moeraki Point. On the eastern facing side of the peninsula there are two small kaiks (crib style settlements) in the north facing bays adjacent to Tikoraki Point (accessed via Te Kirata Rd) and Tawhiroko Point respectively (accessed via Kaika Rd and known as the Kaika). Just north of Tikoraki Point is the small half-hectare island of Maukiekie.

The Moeraki area has a long and extensive history of land instability which poses a high risk of damage to structures. This is caused by large, slowly creeping landslips in the underlying mudstone. Parts of the town occupy a landslip complex, known as the Tenby St Landslip, which is about 900 m (3,000 ft) wide and extends 600 m (2,000 ft) back from the coast. Slips impacted on the reliability of the branch railway line and also the access road to the town.

Heavy rainfall has regularly led to ground movements which have damaged houses and properties in the area. In response to a heavy rainfall event in May 2010 which resulted in land movement and 28 insurance claims on Haven Street the Earthquake Commission in August of that same year installed 250 metres 250 m (820 ft) of drainage pipe to relieve the build-up of underground water.

A hazard map published in May 2012 identified that houses in Haven St, (between Davids and Glamorgan Streets), were located on a large landslip complex and designated 268 sections as being in a “high-risk natural hazard zone”, and a further 24 sections as being in a “very high risk” zone. As a result, approximately 70 of the township's 207 existing rated properties were designated as being in one of the two zones.

In 2013 a 350m to 400 metre long section of Haven Street collapsed following heavy rain which lead to the road having to be closed. At a meeting at the Moeraki marae with the Waitaki District Council (WDC) in 2014 the community offered to work to reopen road. This led to a partnership between the members of the community members and the WDC that completed rebuilding of the road in June 2015. By 2016 the road started to settle which the WDC assets manager claimed was due to the road being sealed "too early" and that the council would monitor it for two years as a gravel road. By 2020 the surface of Haven Street opposite Millers Bay was so uneven that it was closed to heavy vehicles.

== Demographics ==
Moeraki is described as a rural settlement by Statistics New Zealand, and covers 8.53 km^{2} (3.29 sq mi). It had an estimated population of 160 as of June 2025, with a population density of 19 people per km^{2}. It is part of the larger Waihemo statistical area.

Historical population
Year	Pop.	±% p.a.
2006	132	—
2013	114	−2.07%
2018	108	−1.08%
2023	156	+7.63%

Moeraki had a population of 156 in the 2023 New Zealand census, an increase of 48 people (44.4%) since the 2018 census, and an increase of 42 people (36.8%) since the 2013 census. There were 78 males and 78 females in 87 dwellings. 3.8% of people identified as LGBTIQ+. The median age was 62.4 years (compared with 38.1 years nationally). There were 12 people (7.7%) aged under 15 years, 15 (9.6%) aged 15 to 29, 60 (38.5%) aged 30 to 64, and 66 (42.3%) aged 65 or older.

People could identify as more than one ethnicity. The results were 75.0% European (Pākehā), 25.0% Māori, 1.9% Pasifika, 7.7% Asian, and 3.8% other, which includes people giving their ethnicity as "New Zealander". English was spoken by 96.2%, Māori by 7.7%, and other languages by 3.8%. The percentage of people born overseas was 13.5, compared with 28.8% nationally.

Religious affiliations were 36.5% Christian, 3.8% Hindu, 1.9% Māori religious beliefs, and 1.9% New Age. People who answered that they had no religion were 48.1%, and 7.7% of people did not answer the census question.

Of those at least 15 years old, 24 (16.7%) people had a bachelor's or higher degree, 69 (47.9%) had a post-high school certificate or diploma, and 45 (31.2%) people exclusively held high school qualifications. The median income was $30,600, compared with $41,500 nationally. 12 people (8.3%) earned over $100,000 compared to 12.1% nationally. The employment status of those at least 15 was 45 (31.2%) full-time, 27 (18.8%) part-time, and 3 (2.1%) unemployed.

== Economy ==
The local economy is dependent upon farming, small scale commercial fishing and tourism.

== Governance ==
Prior to 1989 Moeraki was under the jurisdiction of the Waitaki County Council. In that year Waitaki County Council amalgamated with the Oamaru Borough Council to form the Waitaki District Council (WDC) which is based in Oamaru. The citizens of Moeraki and nearby Hampden are represented by the Waihemo 14 Community Board and elect representatives of the Waihemo ward to the Waitaki District Council.

== Culture ==
Moeraki Marae is located at Moeraki. It is a marae (meeting ground) of Ngāi Tahu and its Te Rūnanga o Moeraki branch, and includes the Uenuku wharenui.

== Attractions/Amenities ==
Moeraki Peninsula is a breeding area for yellow-eyed penguin, little blue penguin, Stewart Island shag, little shag, spotted shag, royal spoonbill and NZ fur seal. It is a haul out site for sea lion, elephant seal and leopard seal and is visited by various other species. Maukiekie Island is an important site ecologically and the offshore reefs are also of ecological significance. The Moeraki Promotions (Recreation & Heritage) Group (MAPG) collaborates with Tourism Waitaki and Tourism Dunedin to attract visitors to the district. MAPG established a heritage trail at Moeraki in 1993 and another at Herbert in 1999.

In 1862 the Kotahitanga church (whose name means "one people”), was constructed of black pine at the Kaika for the local Ngāi Tahu who had taken up the Wesleyan faith, though the church was built with support from the Anglican mission. It is the oldest surviving Maori mission building in the South Island. By the turn of the twentieth century most of the worshippers were living in Moeraki village which eventually resulted the church being relocated in 1961 from the Kaawa Cemetery Maori Reserve and rebuilt on the waterfront at the west end of Moeraki's Centennial Park. However within seven years it was discovered that the ground was too unstable for the building and it was moved again to its present site further west at a former quarry on Haven St. The church was granted Heritage New Zealand historic place category 1 status in 2010.

Moeraki also has a Seventh Day Adventist chapel.

The Moeraki Yachting and Boating Club has a clubhouse near the boat ramp.

A community hall (called Coronation Hall) was built in 1911 on Haven Street. It was refurbished in 1995 with a grant from the Lotteries Commission.

== Infrastructure ==
The Waitaki District Council (WDC) is responsible for the water supply and the sewage treatment scheme at Moeraki.

A public water supply was established in the district during the early 1960s with the assistance of voluntary labour and services properties in Moeraki and in Hampton. It operates on a points scheme; with a point for households being the equivalent of 200 litres per day, and a point for rural households representing 300 to 400 litres per day. The water supply is drawn from the Big Kuri stream near Hampden. Properties in Moeraki used septic tanks to dispose of their wastewater until a reticulated sewerage system and treatment plant was opened in September 1999. The treated effluent is discharged into a stream which subsequently enters the bay at a point near the Moeraki Boulders.

The jetties, and other facilities, at the port are privately operated, and the WDC does not provide funds for their operation and maintenance.

The village is accessed by a 2.5 km sealed road from its junction with State Highway 1. While there is no public bus service direct to the village passengers can connect with passing buses at the State Highway junction.

== Education ==
A public school was opened in the village in 1890 with a roll of 29 pupils which had grown to 65 by 1905. By 1954, the school had between 20 and 30 pupils. In 1988 the school was closed due to a falling roll. Today the closest primary school is the Hampden Primary School in Hampden and for their secondary education children attend either the East Otago Area School in Palmerston or schools in Oamaru.

== Notable people ==
In the late 1890s Frances Hodgkins regularly visited Moeraki to paint local Māori. A number of those works are now in the collection of the Dunedin Public Art Gallery.

Keri Hulme lived in Moeraki in the 1980s while she wrote her Booker Prize–winning novel The Bone People and set much of its action in the area, thinly disguised as "Moerangi".

Fleur Sullivan, the founder of the well-known Oliver's restaurant in Clyde, Central Otago, moved to Moeraki in the late 1990s and opened her distinctive waterside restaurant "Fleur's Place" in the remains of an old whaling station in 2002.
