= Kia Ora, New Zealand =

Locality in Otago Region, New Zealand

Kia Ora
- Locality
- Interactive map of Kia Ora
- Coordinates: 45.088563°S 170.84488°E
- Country: New Zealand
- Region: Otago
- Territorial authority: Waitaki District
- Ward: Corriedale Ward
- Electorates: Waitaki; Te Tai Tonga (Māori)

Government
  - Territorial authority: Waitaki District Council
  - Regional council: Otago Regional Council
  - Mayor of Waitaki: Melanie Tavendale
  - Waitaki MP: Miles Anderson
  - Te Tai Tonga MP: Mananui Ramsden

Area
  - Total: 34.47 km^{2} (13.31 sq mi)

Population (2023 census)
  - Total: 144
  - Density: 4.18/km^{2} (10.8/sq mi)
- Local iwi: Ngāi Tahu

Kia Ora is a small dairy farming locality in North Otago, centred on Kia Ora Hall. It is located 10 kilometres west of Oamaru and a similar distance north of Maheno. The nearest watercourse is Robbs Crossing River, a small tributary of the Kakanui River.

The name is a common greeting in the Māori language and literally means "May you live". The area was a location where a large amount of moa bones were discovered in 1930.

== Demographics ==
Kia Ora locality covers 34.47 km^{2} (13.31 sq mi). It is part of the Ngapara statistical area.

Historical population for Kia Ora locality
Year	Pop.	±% p.a.
2006	111	—
2013	126	+1.83%
2018	129	+0.47%
2023	144	+2.22%

Kia Ora had a population of 144 in the 2023 New Zealand census, an increase of 15 people (11.6%) since the 2018 census, and an increase of 18 people (14.3%) since the 2013 census. There were 69 males and 75 females in 45 dwellings. 2.1% of people identified as LGBTIQ+. The median age was 39.1 years (compared with 38.1 years nationally). There were 36 people (25.0%) aged under 15 years, 15 (10.4%) aged 15 to 29, 78 (54.2%) aged 30 to 64, and 12 (8.3%) aged 65 or older.

People could identify as more than one ethnicity. The results were 81.2% European (Pākehā), 2.1% Māori, 12.5% Asian, and 12.5% other, which includes people giving their ethnicity as "New Zealander". English was spoken by 100.0%, and other languages by 6.2%. The percentage of people born overseas was 22.9, compared with 28.8% nationally.

Religious affiliations were 33.3% Christian, 2.1% Islam, 2.1% Buddhist, 2.1% New Age, and 2.1% other religions. People who answered that they had no religion were 60.4%, and 2.1% of people did not answer the census question.

Of those at least 15 years old, 21 (19.4%) people had a bachelor's or higher degree, 57 (52.8%) had a post-high school certificate or diploma, and 30 (27.8%) people exclusively held high school qualifications. The median income was $47,500, compared with $41,500 nationally. 12 people (11.1%) earned over $100,000 compared to 12.1% nationally. The employment status of those at least 15 was 57 (52.8%) full-time and 18 (16.7%) part-time.
