= Bortons =

- Rural locality
- Interactive map of Bortons
- Coordinates: 44°52′50″S 170°45′50″E
- Country: New Zealand
- Region: Canterbury
- Territorial authority: Waitaki District
- Ward: Ahuriri Ward
- Community: Ahuriri Community
- Electorates: Waitaki; Te Tai Tonga (Māori)

Government
  - Territorial authority: Waitaki District Council
  - Regional council: Environment Canterbury
  - Mayor of Waitaki: Melanie Tavendale
  - Waitaki MP: Miles Anderson
  - Te Tai Tonga MP: Mananui Ramsden

Area
  - Total: 62.04 km^{2} (23.95 sq mi)

Population (2023 census)
  - Total: 132
  - Density: 2.13/km^{2} (5.51/sq mi)
- Local iwi: Ngāi Tahu

Bortons is a small settlement on the southern bank of the Waitaki River in New Zealand's South Island. It is located on SH 83, 7 km east of Duntroon.

The settlement is named after surveyor and civil engineer John Borton, a pioneer of the district, who acquired a nearby run in 1854.

Bortons Pond, the headwaters of the lower Waitaki irrigation scheme, is located at Black Point, to the east of Bortons. It irrigates some 20,000 hectares (49,000 acres) of farmland across the South Canterbury and North Otago regions.

Bortons lends its name to the Bortonian stage, one of the divisions of the New Zealand geologic time scale.

== Demographics ==
Bortons locality covers 62.04 km^{2} (23.95 sq mi). It is part of the Danseys Pass statistical area.

Historical population for the locality
Year	Pop.	±% p.a.
2006	87	—
2013	141	+7.14%
2018	126	−2.22%
2023	132	+0.93%

Bortons had a population of 132 in the 2023 New Zealand census, an increase of 6 people (4.8%) since the 2018 census, and a decrease of 9 people (−6.4%) since the 2013 census. There were 69 males and 63 females in 57 dwellings. 2.3% of people identified as LGBTIQ+. The median age was 30.0 years (compared with 38.1 years nationally). There were 36 people (27.3%) aged under 15 years, 33 (25.0%) aged 15 to 29, 57 (43.2%) aged 30 to 64, and 9 (6.8%) aged 65 or older.

People could identify as more than one ethnicity. The results were 68.2% European (Pākehā), 6.8% Māori, 2.3% Pasifika, 29.5% Asian, and 4.5% other, which includes people giving their ethnicity as "New Zealander". English was spoken by 95.5%, and other languages by 20.5%. The percentage of people born overseas was 29.5, compared with 28.8% nationally.

Religious affiliations were 36.4% Christian, and 9.1% Buddhist. People who answered that they had no religion were 47.7%, and 11.4% of people did not answer the census question.

Of those at least 15 years old, 24 (25.0%) people had a bachelor's or higher degree, 54 (56.2%) had a post-high school certificate or diploma, and 27 (28.1%) people exclusively held high school qualifications. The median income was $58,800, compared with $41,500 nationally. 12 people (12.5%) earned over $100,000 compared to 12.1% nationally. The employment status of those at least 15 was 75 (78.1%) full-time and 12 (12.5%) part-time.
