= Georgetown, Otago =

Georgetown
- Locality
- Interactive map of Georgetown
- Coordinates: 44°54′40″S 170°50′40″E
- Country: New Zealand
- Region: Otago
- Territorial authority: Waitaki District
- Ward: Corriedale Ward
- Electorates: Waitaki; Te Tai Tonga (Māori)

Government
  - Territorial authority: Waitaki District Council
  - Regional council: Otago Regional Council
  - Mayor of Waitaki: Melanie Tavendale
  - Waitaki MP: Miles Anderson
  - Te Tai Tonga MP: Mananui Ramsden

Area
  - Total: 81.96 km^{2} (31.64 sq mi)

Population (2023 census)
  - Total: 216
  - Density: 2.64/km^{2} (6.83/sq mi)
- Time zone: UTC+12 (New Zealand Standard Time)
  - Summer (DST): UTC+13 (New Zealand Daylight Time)
- Postcode: 9400
- Local iwi: Ngāi Tahu

Georgetown is a small settlement close to the south bank of the Waitaki River in the South Island of New Zealand. It is located 15 km (9.3 mi) southeast of Duntroon, to which it is connected via State Highway 83.

The first sections in the area were sold in 1870. The location was named for former Otago Provincial Treasurer George Duncan.

The area around Georgetown is noted for the presence of early Māori rock paintings, and the discovery of many moa remains.

== Demographics ==
Georgetown locality covers 81.96 km^{2} (31.64 sq mi). It is part of the Ngapara statistical area.

Historical population for Georgetown locality
Year	Pop.	±% p.a.
2006	165	—
2013	189	+1.96%
2018	213	+2.42%
2023	216	+0.28%

Georgetown had a population of 216 in the 2023 New Zealand census, an increase of 3 people (1.4%) since the 2018 census, and an increase of 27 people (14.3%) since the 2013 census. There were 120 males and 96 females in 75 dwellings. 1.4% of people identified as LGBTIQ+. The median age was 34.2 years (compared with 38.1 years nationally). There were 63 people (29.2%) aged under 15 years, 36 (16.7%) aged 15 to 29, 102 (47.2%) aged 30 to 64, and 15 (6.9%) aged 65 or older.

People could identify as more than one ethnicity. The results were 75.0% European (Pākehā); 5.6% Māori; 16.7% Asian; 4.2% Middle Eastern, Latin American and African New Zealanders (MELAA); and 5.6% other, which includes people giving their ethnicity as "New Zealander". English was spoken by 97.2%, Māori by 1.4%, and other languages by 16.7%. No language could be spoken by 1.4% (e.g. too young to talk). The percentage of people born overseas was 27.8, compared with 28.8% nationally.

Religious affiliations were 51.4% Christian, 1.4% Māori religious beliefs, and 1.4% New Age. People who answered that they had no religion were 38.9%, and 6.9% of people did not answer the census question.

Of those at least 15 years old, 27 (17.6%) people had a bachelor's or higher degree, 78 (51.0%) had a post-high school certificate or diploma, and 45 (29.4%) people exclusively held high school qualifications. The median income was $59,900, compared with $41,500 nationally. 9 people (5.9%) earned over $100,000 compared to 12.1% nationally. The employment status of those at least 15 was 108 (70.6%) full-time, 21 (13.7%) part-time, and 3 (2.0%) unemployed.
