= Ngapara =

- Rural locality
- Interactive map of Ngapara
- Coordinates: 44°57′S 170°45′E
- Country: New Zealand
- Region: Otago
- Territorial authority: Waitaki District
- Ward: Corriedale Ward
- Electorates: Waitaki; Te Tai Tonga (Māori)

Government
  - Territorial authority: Waitaki District Council
  - Regional council: Otago Regional Council
  - Mayor of Waitaki: Melanie Tavendale
  - Waitaki MP: Miles Anderson
  - Te Tai Tonga MP: Mananui Ramsden
- Time zone: UTC+12 (New Zealand Standard Time)
  - Summer (DST): UTC+13 (New Zealand Daylight Time)
- Postcode: 9494

Ngapara is a locality in the north Otago region of New Zealand's South Island. It is located in a rural setting 25 km inland from Oamaru. The name of Ngapara is derived from the Māori word for the "tables" or plateaus of limestone in the area.

== Economy ==
Agriculture is the most important economic activity, with farming activity consisting primarily of sheep husbandry and growing cereal crops such as wheat. A flour mill was established in the town in 1898. Heavier industrial activity has also taken place around Ngapara, including mining for lignite coal and limestone. In recent years, due to the dairy boom happening around New Zealand, there has been an increase in the number of dairy farms in the surrounding area. This is aided by the installment of the Tokarahi Irrigation Scheme in 2006. This scheme has provided a much needed source of water to farmers of the area.

== Railway ==
From 1 April 1877 until 31 July 1959, Ngapara was the terminus of the Ngapara Branch, a branch line railway that left the Main South Line near Oamaru. At its peak, Ngapara station had a small locomotive depot, complete with turntable. Ngapara was one of the first towns on New Zealand's national rail network to lose its passenger service, with a bus substitute introduced in December 1926. In the wake of this decision, the locomotive depot was closed in 1927 and trains operated from Oamaru rather than Ngapara, though the turntable remained inactive and was not removed until the last train, a work train that ran on 10 December 1959, months after the official closure. Some remnants of the railway remain, including the station's platform and loading bank, and the station sign is now affixed to the exterior of the local rugby club's rooms.

== School ==
Ngapara Primary School was opened in 1877, for 5 to 13-year-old children. In latter years it had 23 students and one teacher. When the students reached high school age they were bused into Oamaru to one of its three high schools. In 1998 the school closed, and since then students have mostly attended the primary school in Weston, with some at Duntroon primary school. Much of Ngapara Primary School's buildings and supplies were transferred for use in Weston.

== Ngapara statistical area ==
Ngapara statistical area includes Georgetown and Tokarahi. It covers 1,134.56 km^{2} (438.06 sq mi) and had an estimated population of 1,970 as of June 2025, with a population density of 1.7 people per km^{2}.

Historical population
Year	Pop.	±% p.a.
2006	1,536	—
2013	1,611	+0.68%
2018	1,806	+2.31%
2023	1,749	−0.64%

Ngapara had a population of 1,749 in the 2023 New Zealand census, a decrease of 57 people (−3.2%) since the 2018 census, and an increase of 138 people (8.6%) since the 2013 census. There were 921 males and 825 females in 684 dwellings. 1.9% of people identified as LGBTIQ+. The median age was 36.2 years (compared with 38.1 years nationally). There were 399 people (22.8%) aged under 15 years, 285 (16.3%) aged 15 to 29, 879 (50.3%) aged 30 to 64, and 183 (10.5%) aged 65 or older.

People could identify as more than one ethnicity. The results were 80.4% European (Pākehā); 8.1% Māori; 1.4% Pasifika; 13.9% Asian; 1.2% Middle Eastern, Latin American and African New Zealanders (MELAA); and 5.5% other, which includes people giving their ethnicity as "New Zealander". English was spoken by 97.6%, Māori by 1.2%, Samoan by 0.2%, and other languages by 11.3%. No language could be spoken by 1.7% (e.g. too young to talk). New Zealand Sign Language was known by 0.3%. The percentage of people born overseas was 23.0, compared with 28.8% nationally.

Religious affiliations were 36.4% Christian, 1.0% Hindu, 0.7% Islam, 0.2% Māori religious beliefs, 0.2% Buddhist, 1.0% New Age, and 1.0% other religions. People who answered that they had no religion were 52.3%, and 7.2% of people did not answer the census question.

Of those at least 15 years old, 258 (19.1%) people had a bachelor's or higher degree, 762 (56.4%) had a post-high school certificate or diploma, and 330 (24.4%) people exclusively held high school qualifications. The median income was $47,500, compared with $41,500 nationally. 111 people (8.2%) earned over $100,000 compared to 12.1% nationally. The employment status of those at least 15 was 819 (60.7%) full-time, 234 (17.3%) part-time, and 24 (1.8%) unemployed.
