= Herbert, New Zealand =

Herbert
- Rural settlement
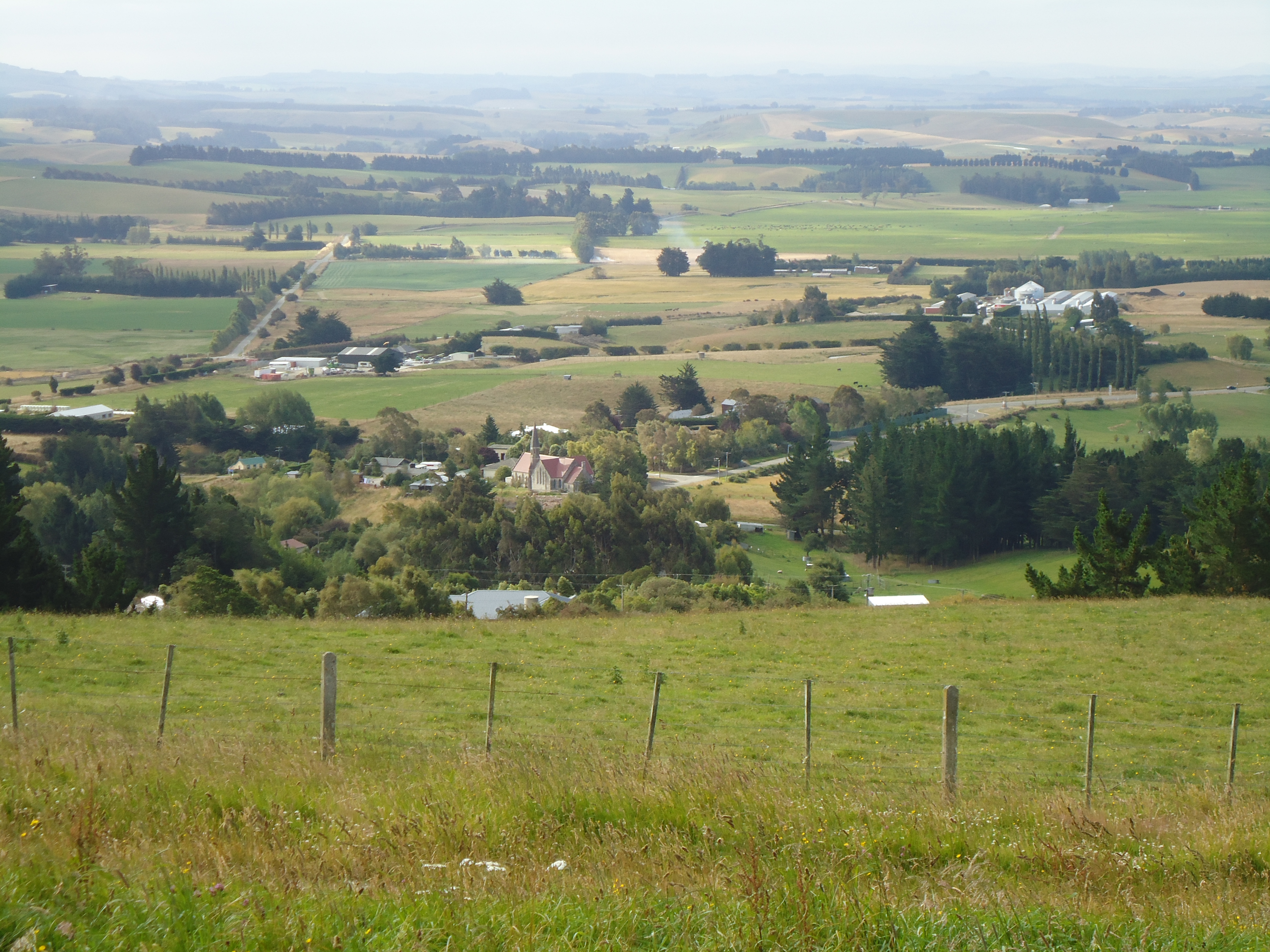
- View of Herbert taken from Mount Charles
- Interactive map of Herbert
- Coordinates: 45°14′S 170°47′E
- Country: New Zealand
- Region: Otago
- Territorial authority: Waitaki District
- Ward: Corriedale Ward
- Electorates: Waitaki; Te Tai Tonga (Māori)

Government
  - Territorial authority: Waitaki District Council
  - Regional council: Otago Regional Council
  - Mayor of Waitaki: Melanie Tavendale
  - Waitaki MP: Miles Anderson
  - Te Tai Tonga MP: Mananui Ramsden

Area
  - Total: 1.11 km^{2} (0.43 sq mi)

Population (June 2025)
  - Total: 110
  - Density: 99/km^{2} (260/sq mi)
- Local iwi: Ngāi Tahu

The small town of Herbert lies in North Otago, New Zealand, 91 kilometres (57 mi) north of Dunedin and 22 kilometres (14 mi) south-west of Oamaru. It lies on the edge of the Herbert Forest.

It is named after Sydney Herbert, a member of the Canterbury Association who as the British secretary of war was responsible for sending Florence Nightingale to the Crimea in 1854.

Herbert consists of a group of houses and three churches clustered around State Highway 1. A service station is also the postal agency. Two main industries operate in Herbert; an agricultural, industrial and forestry helicopter base and a poultry unit. Surrounding the settlement is rolling and fertile pastureland. The poultry farm, Craigs Poultry, was a finalist for the 2007 Otago Ballance Farm Environment Awards. The Main South Line also passes through Herbert, and a station existed here until its closure in 1980; only the crossing loop remains. The short 220-metre Otepopo railway tunnel is also in the vicinity.

On a north-facing site 300 metres (330 yd) from the town was the Otepopo School. This was a primary school for children from 5 to about 13 years old. Thereafter, the children went to Oamaru for further education. Otepopo school was closed in September 2010, due to a rapid decline in the school roll. From 22 pupils in 2009, its roll had dropped to 4 before its closure.

== Waianakarua ==
Some five kilometres south of Herbert is the farming settlement of Waianakarua. The old stone bridge at Waianakarua is the oldest that is still used by the New Zealand State Highway network. This bridge was dismantled stone by stone in 2004, and rebuilt 2 metres wider. In 2005 it was reopened as part of the State Highway network again. Alongside this bridge is an early example of a flourmill (now meals and accommodation – The Mill House]) and 3 km upstream from the bridge is an historical site of another early flourmill, alongside the remains of a dam.

Among Waianakarua's more well-known landmarks is "The Chook Tree", a topiary bird standing several metres tall, next to which is a hollow plaster "egg". The Hesperocyparis macrocarpa tree, which was sculpted by local farmers Norman and Evelyn Clarke following damage by a storm in 1978, was voted as the New Zealand Tree of the Year in 2025.

The son of Burt Munro, portrayed by Anthony Hopkins in the film The World's Fastest Indian, resides in Waianakarua and has Burt's (now famous) motorcycle among his possessions.

Pig hunting and sea and river fishing are some of the activities available in the Herbert and Waianakarua district.

== Demographics ==
Herbert is described as a rural settlement by Statistics New Zealand, and covers 1.11 km^{2} (0.43 sq mi). It had an estimated population of 110 as of June 2025, with a population density of 99 people per km^{2}. It is part of the larger Maheno statistical area.

Historical population
Year	Pop.	±% p.a.
2006	114	—
2013	111	−0.38%
2018	96	−2.86%
2023	105	+1.81%

Herbert had a population of 105 in the 2023 New Zealand census, an increase of 9 people (9.4%) since the 2018 census, and a decrease of 6 people (−5.4%) since the 2013 census. There were 54 males and 51 females in 51 dwellings. 8.6% of people identified as LGBTIQ+. The median age was 54.6 years (compared with 38.1 years nationally). There were 12 people (11.4%) aged under 15 years, 6 (5.7%) aged 15 to 29, 63 (60.0%) aged 30 to 64, and 21 (20.0%) aged 65 or older.

People could identify as more than one ethnicity. The results were 97.1% European (Pākehā), 5.7% Māori, 2.9% Asian, and 5.7% other, which includes people giving their ethnicity as "New Zealander". English was spoken by 100.0%, and other languages by 2.9%. The percentage of people born overseas was 11.4, compared with 28.8% nationally.

The sole religious affiliation given was 25.7% Christian. People who answered that they had no religion were 71.4%, and 2.9% of people did not answer the census question.

Of those at least 15 years old, 15 (16.1%) people had a bachelor's or higher degree, 42 (45.2%) had a post-high school certificate or diploma, and 27 (29.0%) people exclusively held high school qualifications. The median income was $30,000, compared with $41,500 nationally. 6 people (6.5%) earned over $100,000 compared to 12.1% nationally. The employment status of those at least 15 was 42 (45.2%) full-time and 12 (12.9%) part-time.

== Climate ==
Climate data for Herbert Forest (1971–2000)
Month	Jan	Feb	Mar	Apr	May	Jun	Jul	Aug	Sep	Oct	Nov	Dec	Year
Mean daily maximum °C (°F)	20.9 (69.6)	20.3 (68.5)	19.1 (66.4)	16.9 (62.4)	14.0 (57.2)	11.5 (52.7)	11.0 (51.8)	12.5 (54.5)	14.7 (58.5)	16.2 (61.2)	17.7 (63.9)	19.0 (66.2)	16.2 (61.1)
Daily mean °C (°F)	15.2 (59.4)	14.6 (58.3)	13.3 (55.9)	10.8 (51.4)	8.5 (47.3)	6.0 (42.8)	5.4 (41.7)	6.7 (44.1)	8.8 (47.8)	10.5 (50.9)	11.8 (53.2)	13.7 (56.7)	10.4 (50.8)
Mean daily minimum °C (°F)	9.4 (48.9)	9.0 (48.2)	7.6 (45.7)	4.7 (40.5)	2.9 (37.2)	0.6 (33.1)	−0.1 (31.8)	0.9 (33.6)	2.9 (37.2)	4.8 (40.6)	6.0 (42.8)	8.3 (46.9)	4.8 (40.5)
Average rainfall mm (inches)	56 (2.2)	39 (1.5)	61 (2.4)	53 (2.1)	50 (2.0)	41 (1.6)	55 (2.2)	45 (1.8)	41 (1.6)	53 (2.1)	81 (3.2)	60 (2.4)	635 (25.1)
Source: NIWA (rain 1951–1980)
