= Otematata =

Town in the Waitaki District of Canterbury in New Zealand's South Island

- Town
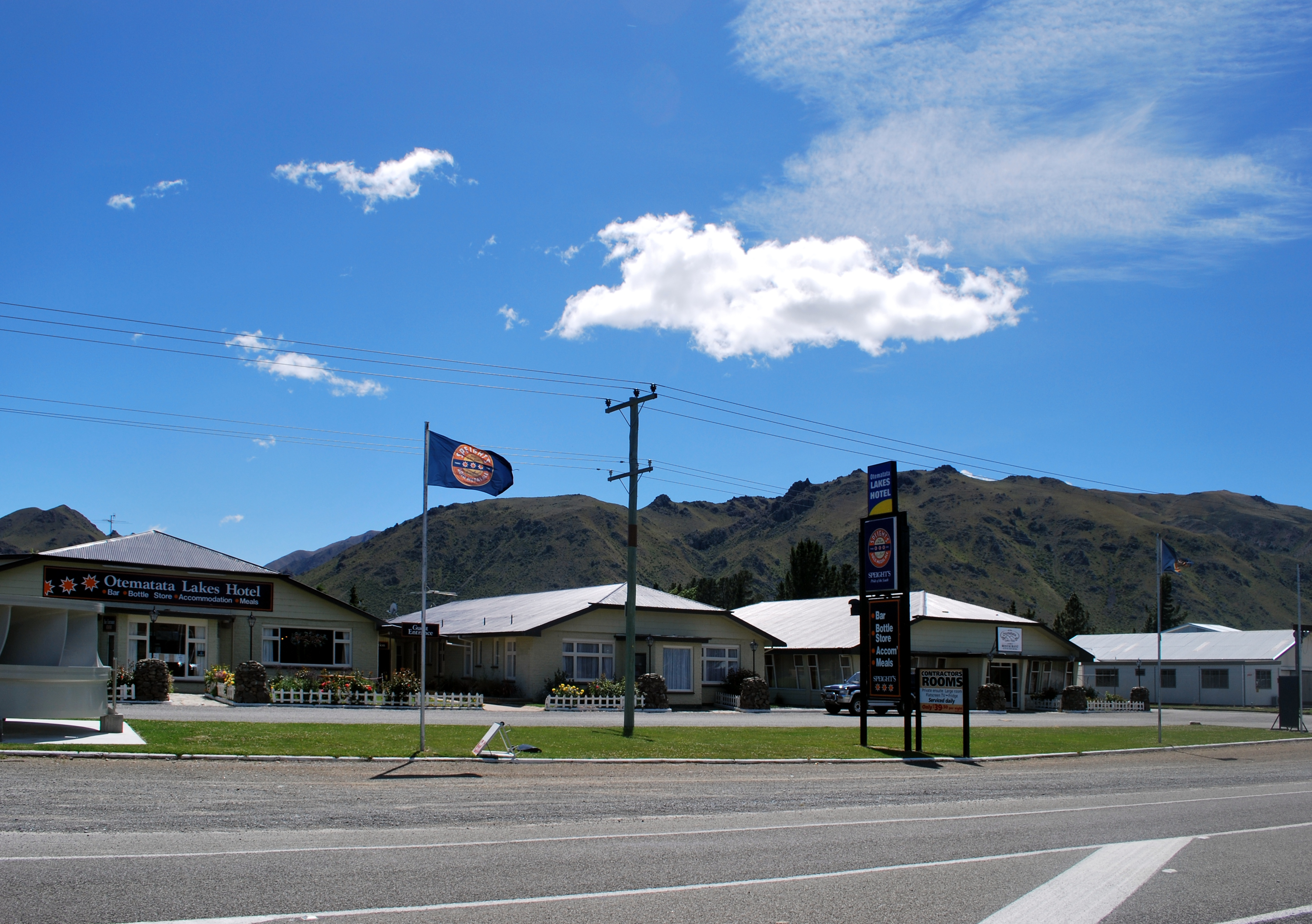
- New Zealand State Highway 83 passing through Otematata
- Interactive map of Otematata
- Coordinates: 44°36′25″S 170°11′28″E
- Country: New Zealand
- Region: Canterbury
- Territorial authority: Waitaki District
- Ward: Ahuriri Ward
- Community: Ahuriri Community
- Electorates: Waitaki; Te Tai Tonga (Māori)

Government
  - Territorial authority: Waitaki District Council
  - Regional council: Environment Canterbury
  - Mayor of Waitaki: Melanie Tavendale
  - Waitaki MP: Miles Anderson
  - Te Tai Tonga MP: Mananui Ramsden

Area
  - Total: 2.43 km^{2} (0.94 sq mi)

Population (June 2025)
  - Total: 190
  - Density: 78/km^{2} (200/sq mi)
- Time zone: UTC+12 (New Zealand Standard Time)
  - Summer (DST): UTC+13 (New Zealand Daylight Time)
- Postcode: 9412
- Local iwi: Ngāi Tahu

Otematata is a town in the Waitaki District of Canterbury in New Zealand's South Island. It is described as a "populated area less than a town" and the estimated population was 190 in June 2025, The population was considerably higher in the 1960s during the construction of the Benmore and Aviemore dams.

Surrounded by rugged peaks and beautiful lakes of the Waitaki Valley, the earliest inhabitants of the area were Māori on hunting expeditions or travelling through the valley to reach the inland areas and mountain passes. Otematata in Māori means "place of good flint".

The Otematata township was built in 1958 as a base for the construction of the Aviemore and Benmore Dams. ECNZ (Electricity Corporation of New Zealand) used it as a base until the early 1990s. Prior to that there were a few 'high country' sheep stations, Rostiever Run owned by the Munro family and Otematata Station owned by the Cameron family.

ECNZ's successors' presence is now minimal as the dams are operated by remote control, and Otematata is becoming a village of holiday homes. It is a popular holiday destination with a hotel, restaurant, camping ground, backpackers, and other basic services. The townships population swells to over 5000 people in the Christmas and New Year holiday season as holiday makers from around New Zealand come to enjoy the lakes. Water skiing is a popular pastime in the Waitaki Valley.

== Climate ==
Like many inland areas, Otematata has weather that ranges from very cold in winter to very hot in summer. In the past 14 years, temperatures have ranged from 37.5 °C to −8.5 °C, with annual rainfall ranging from 275mm to 563mm.

Climate data for Otematata (1951–1980)
Month	Jan	Feb	Mar	Apr	May	Jun	Jul	Aug	Sep	Oct	Nov	Dec	Year
Mean daily maximum °C (°F)	23.6 (74.5)	23.3 (73.9)	20.9 (69.6)	17.0 (62.6)	12.0 (53.6)	8.3 (46.9)	7.9 (46.2)	10.8 (51.4)	14.9 (58.8)	17.5 (63.5)	19.4 (66.9)	21.8 (71.2)	16.5 (61.6)
Daily mean °C (°F)	17.1 (62.8)	16.8 (62.2)	14.7 (58.5)	11.2 (52.2)	7 (45)	3.9 (39.0)	3.2 (37.8)	5.3 (41.5)	8.7 (47.7)	11.3 (52.3)	13.2 (55.8)	15.4 (59.7)	10.7 (51.2)
Mean daily minimum °C (°F)	10.5 (50.9)	10.3 (50.5)	9.1 (48.4)	5.8 (42.4)	2.1 (35.8)	−0.6 (30.9)	−1.2 (29.8)	0.3 (32.5)	2.9 (37.2)	5.2 (41.4)	7.0 (44.6)	9.3 (48.7)	5.1 (41.1)
Average rainfall mm (inches)	47 (1.9)	36 (1.4)	43 (1.7)	38 (1.5)	35 (1.4)	28 (1.1)	27 (1.1)	23 (0.9)	31 (1.2)	39 (1.5)	44 (1.7)	39 (1.5)	430 (16.9)
Source: NIWA

== Demographics ==
Otematata is described as a rural settlement by Statistics New Zealand, and covers 2.43 km^{2} (0.94 sq mi). It had an estimated population of 190 as of June 2025, with a population density of 78 people per km^{2}. It is part of the larger Aviemore statistical area.

Historical population
Year	Pop.	±% p.a.
2006	189	—
2013	186	−0.23%
2018	183	−0.32%
2023	180	−0.33%

Otematata had a population of 180 in the 2023 New Zealand census, a decrease of 3 people (−1.6%) since the 2018 census, and a decrease of 6 people (−3.2%) since the 2013 census. There were 102 males and 81 females in 117 dwellings. The median age was 62.5 years (compared with 38.1 years nationally). There were 3 people (1.7%) aged under 15 years, 12 (6.7%) aged 15 to 29, 78 (43.3%) aged 30 to 64, and 84 (46.7%) aged 65 or older.

People could identify as more than one ethnicity. The results were 93.3% European (Pākehā); 5.0% Māori; 1.7% Asian; 1.7% Middle Eastern, Latin American and African New Zealanders (MELAA); and 3.3% other, which includes people giving their ethnicity as "New Zealander". English was spoken by 100.0%, Māori by 1.7%, and other languages by 5.0%. The percentage of people born overseas was 18.3, compared with 28.8% nationally.

Religious affiliations were 35.0% Christian, and 1.7% Hindu. People who answered that they had no religion were 55.0%, and 10.0% of people did not answer the census question.

Of those at least 15 years old, 15 (8.5%) people had a bachelor's or higher degree, 99 (55.9%) had a post-high school certificate or diploma, and 66 (37.3%) people exclusively held high school qualifications. The median income was $28,400, compared with $41,500 nationally. 12 people (6.8%) earned over $100,000 compared to 12.1% nationally. The employment status of those at least 15 was 78 (44.1%) full-time and 15 (8.5%) part-time.

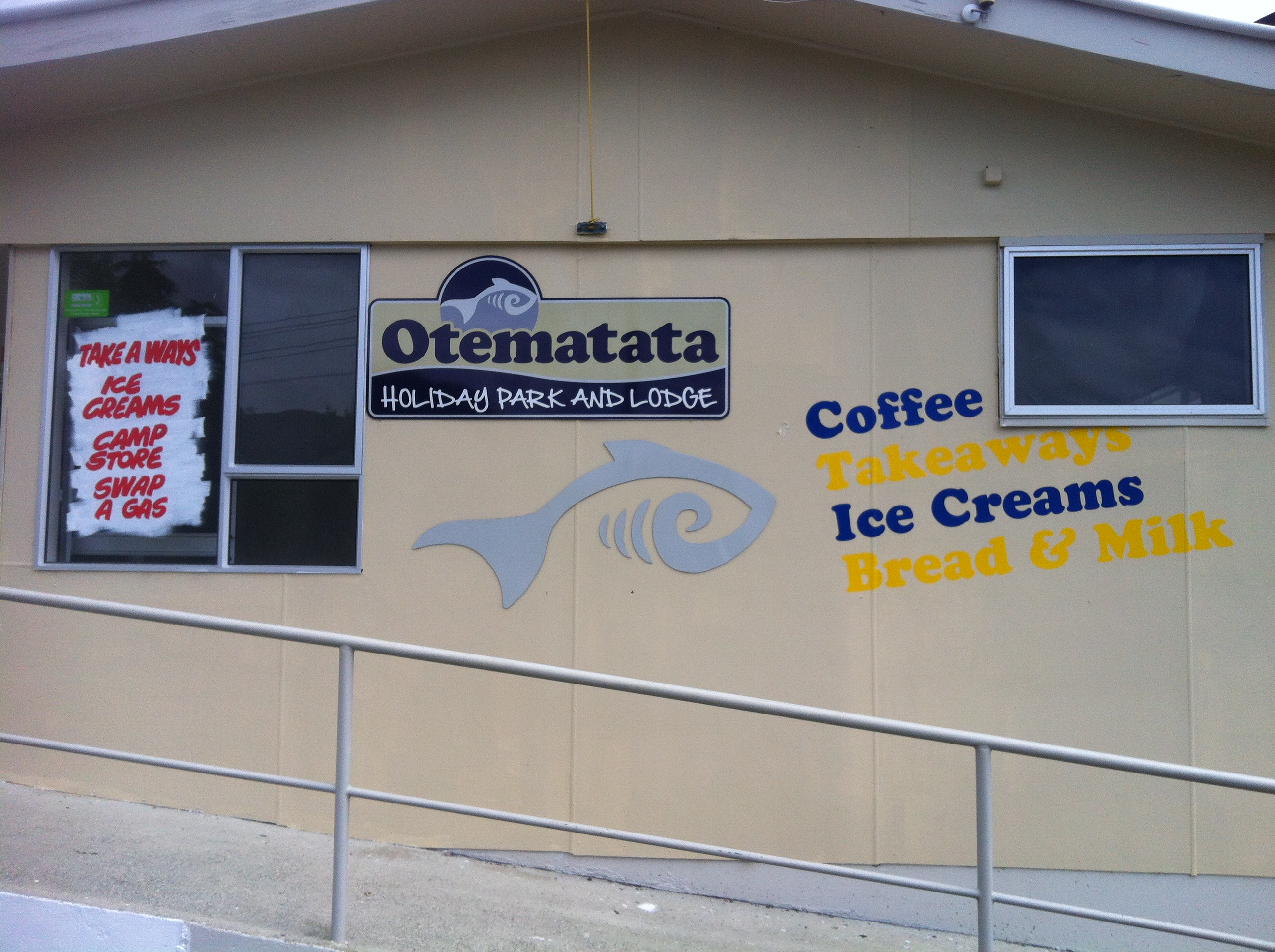
The Otematata Holiday Park and Lodge.

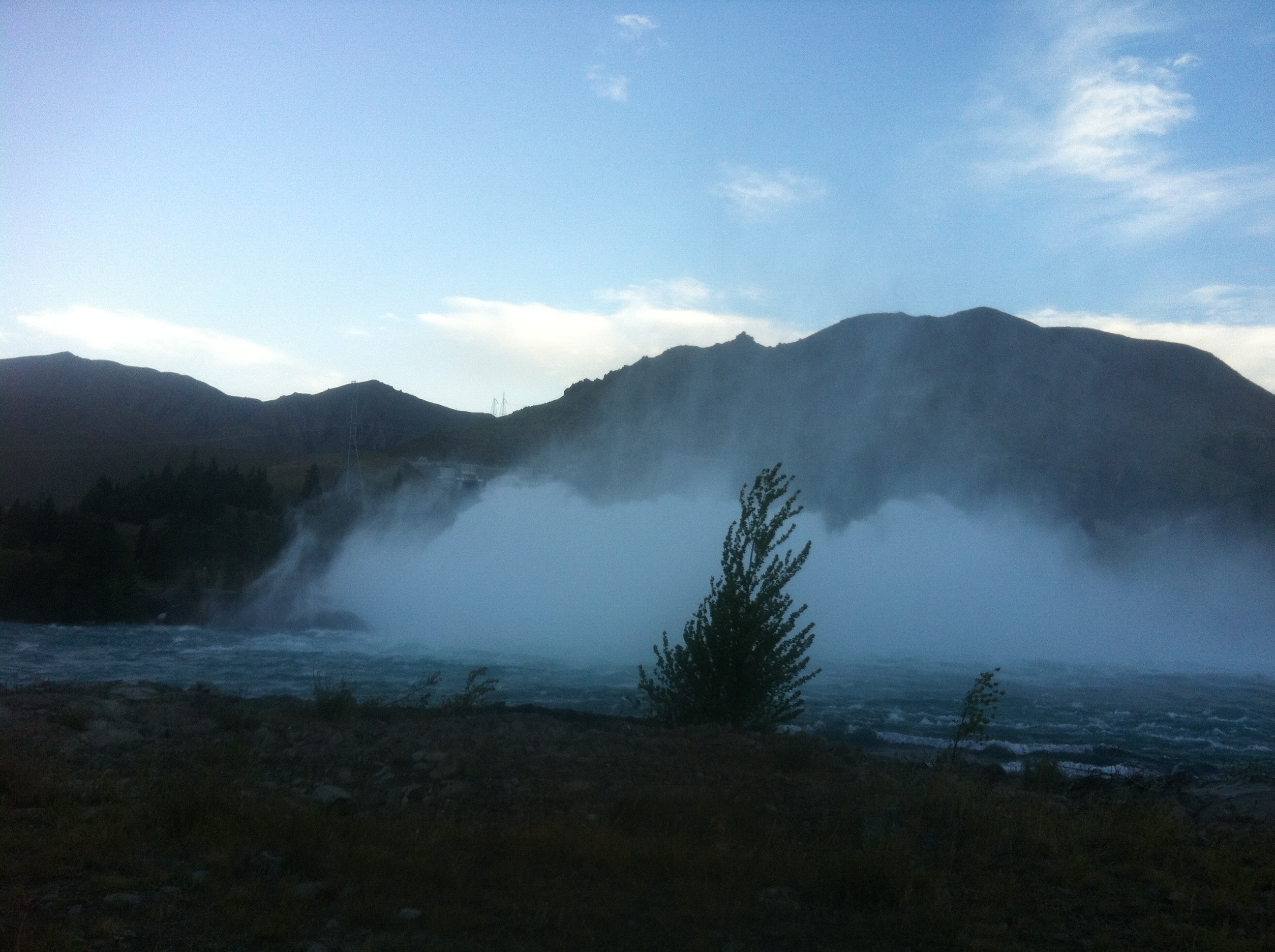
The Benmore Dam spillway in full force.

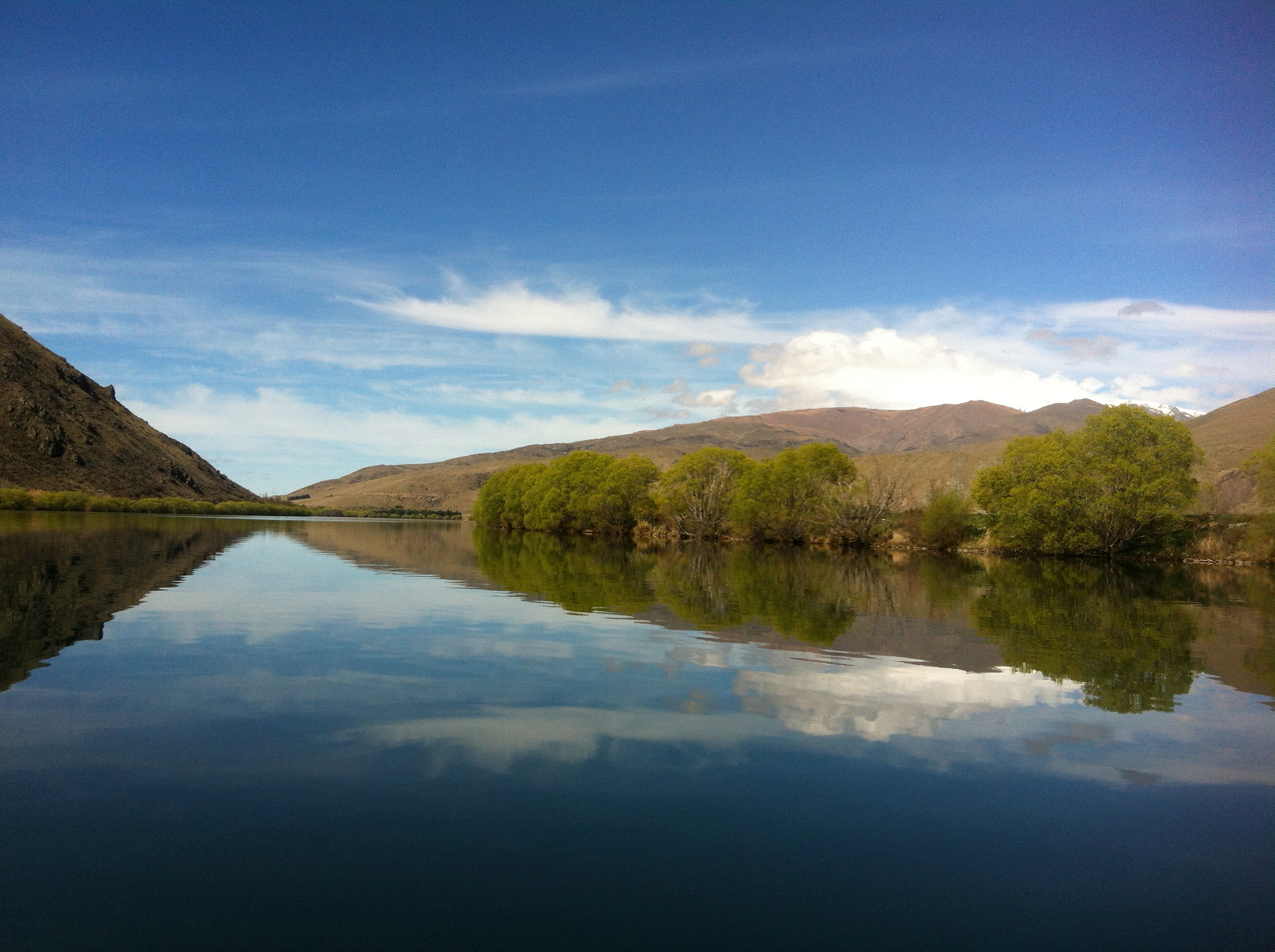
A spring day on Lake Aviemore.
