= Waitaki District =

- Territorial authority district
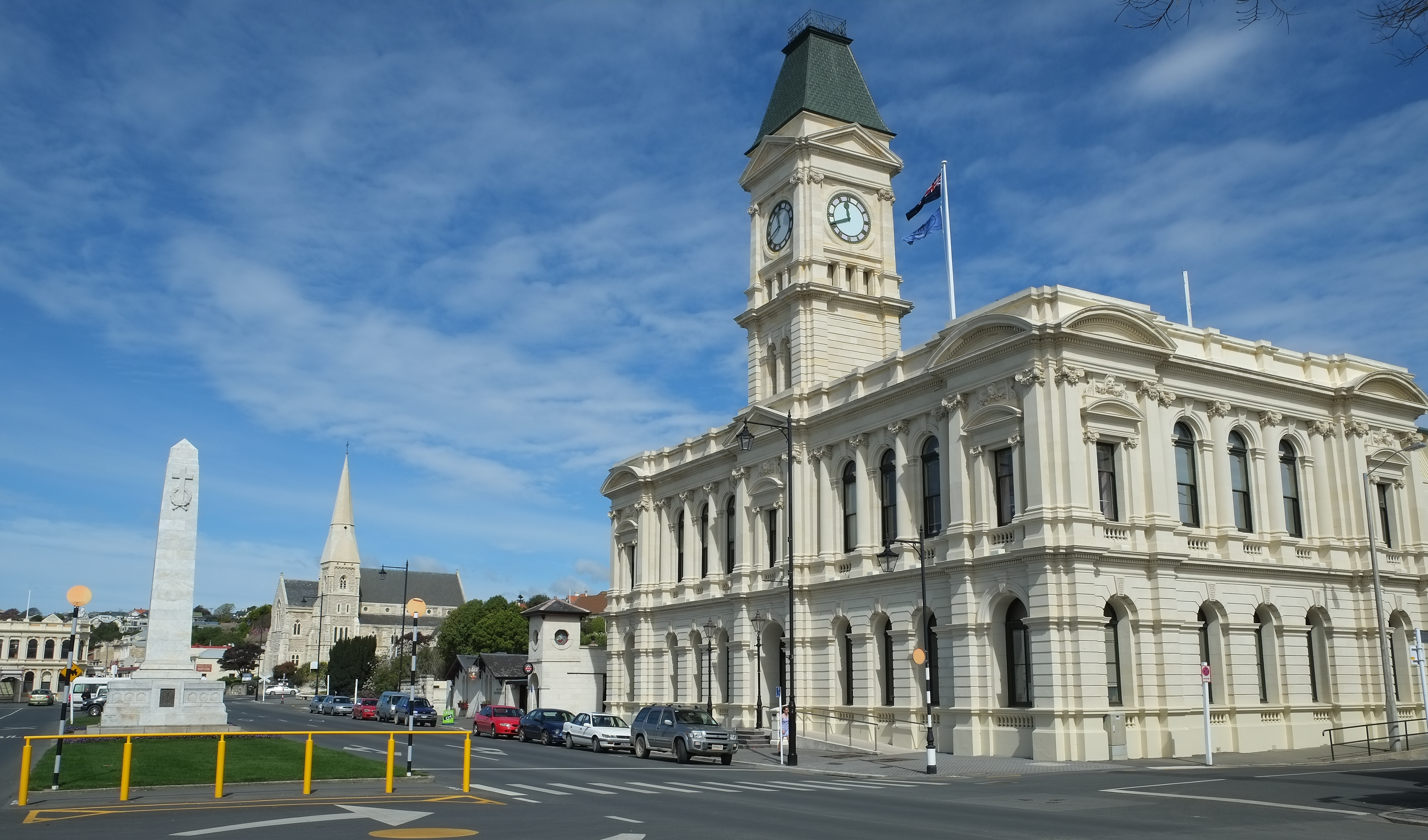
- Waitaki District Council building, Thames Street, Oamaru

- Waitaki district in the South Island
- Coordinates: 44°55′34″S 170°38′06″E
- Country: New Zealand
- Regions: Canterbury (majority); Otago (part)
- Communities: Ahuriri; Waihemo
- Wards: Ahuriri; Corriedale; Oamaru; Waihemo
- Formed: 1989
- Seat: Oamaru
- Towns: List: Hampden; Kakanui; Kurow; Moeraki; Omarama; Palmerston; Weston; Dunback; Duntroon; Herbert; Macraes; Maheno; Ngapara; Otematata; Pukeuri; Reidston; Waitaki Bridge

Government
  - Mayor of Waitaki: Melanie Tavendale
  - Territorial authority: Waitaki District Council
  - Waitaki MP: Miles Anderson
  - Te Tai Tonga MP: Mananui Ramsden

Area
  - Land: 7,107.94 km^{2} (2,744.39 sq mi)

Population (June 2025)
  - Total: 24,600
  - Density: 3.46/km^{2} (8.96/sq mi)
- Time zone: UTC+12 (NZST)
  - Summer (DST): UTC+13 (NZDT)
- Postcode(s): Map of postcodes
- Postcode(s): 7977
- Area code: 03
- Website: www.waitaki.govt.nz

Waitaki District is a territorial authority district in the Canterbury and Otago regions of the South Island of New Zealand. It straddles the former border between the two regions, the Waitaki River, and its seat is Oamaru.

== History ==
Waitaki District is made up of the former Waitaki County, Waihemo County and Oamaru Borough, which were amalgamated in 1989. It is governed by the Waitaki District Council.

== Name ==
During the colonial period, the area was also known as Molesworth. However, the Māori name Waitaki eventually prevailed.

== Geography ==
It has a land area of 7,107.73 km^{2} (2,744.31 sq mi), of which 4,195.17 km^{2} (1,619.76 sq mi) or 59.02% is in the Canterbury Region and 2,912.56 km^{2} (1,124.55 sq mi) or 40.98% in the Otago Region. It is the only district in the South Island that lies in two regions.

A major reason for this split was the governance of the Waitaki River, which formed a political boundary between Canterbury and Otago. With major hydro schemes on this river, it was decided to place the entire catchment in one administrative region, thus forming the split. Some people in the Canterbury Region of Waitaki District still regard themselves as part of Otago, and attempts have been made in the past to change the boundary. The district, which is agricultural by nature, comprises the wide alluvial fan of the river, and runs inland along the banks of the river, forming a roughly triangular region.

=== Urban areas and settlements ===
Oamaru, the district seat, is the only town in the Waitaki district with a population over 1,000. It is home to 14,300 people, 58.1% of the district's population.

Other settlements and localities in the district include:

Ahuriri Ward:

- Aviemore
- Benmore
- Black Point
- Bortons
- Clearburn
- Danseys Pass
- Duntroon
- Earthquakes
- Kokoamo
- Kurow
- Ōhau
- Lake Waitaki
- Lindis Pass
- Livingstone
- Maerewhenua
- Omarama
- Otekaieke
- Otematata
- Otiake
- Pukeraro
- Strachans
- Waikaura
- Wharekuri

Waihemo Ward:

- Billys Flat
- Dunback
- Flag Swamp
- Glenpark
- Goodwood
- Green Valley
- Hampden
- Hillgrove
- Inch Valley
- Kaika
- Kātiki
- Macraes
- Mākareao
- Meadowbank
- Moeraki
- Moonlight Flat
- Morrisons
- Nenthorn
- Palmerston
- Pleasant Valley
- Shag Point
- Shag Valley
- Stoneburn
- Trotters Gorge
- Waianakarua
- Waihemo
- Wairunga
- Waynes
- Puketapu

Corriedale Ward:

- Airedale
- All Day Bay
- Awamoko
- Cormacks
- Corriedale
- Elderslie
- Enfield
- Five Forks
- Fuchsia Creek
- Georgetown
- Herbert
- Hilderthorpe
- Incholme
- Island Cliff
- Island Stream
- Kakanui
- Kauru Hill
- Kia Ora
- Kuriheka
- Maheno
- Maraeweka
- Marakerake
- Maruakoa
- Ngapara
- Otepopo
- Papakaio
- Peebles
- Pukeuri
- Queens Flat
- Reidston
- Richmond
- Rosebery
- Tapui
- Taranui
- Teschemakers
- Tokarahi
- Totara
- Waimotu
- Waitaki Bridge
- Whitecraig
- Whitstone
- Windsor Park
- Windsor

Oamaru Ward:

- Ardgowan
- Oamaru
- Weston

== Demographics ==
Waitaki District covers 7,107.94 km^{2} (2,744.39 sq mi) and had an estimated population of 24,600 as of June 2025, with a population density of 3.5 people per km^{2}.

Historical population
Year	Pop.	±% p.a.
2006	20,223	—
2013	20,829	+0.42%
2018	22,308	+1.38%
2023	23,472	+1.02%

Waitaki District had a population of 23,472 in the 2023 New Zealand census, an increase of 1,164 people (5.2%) since the 2018 census, and an increase of 2,643 people (12.7%) since the 2013 census. There were 11,658 males, 11,745 females and 69 people of other genders in 9,975 dwellings. 2.4% of people identified as LGBTIQ+. The median age was 46.1 years (compared with 38.1 years nationally). There were 4,035 people (17.2%) aged under 15 years, 3,507 (14.9%) aged 15 to 29, 10,317 (44.0%) aged 30 to 64, and 5,610 (23.9%) aged 65 or older.

People could identify as more than one ethnicity. The results were 85.0% European (Pākehā); 9.5% Māori; 5.5% Pasifika; 6.9% Asian; 0.7% Middle Eastern, Latin American and African New Zealanders (MELAA); and 3.1% other, which includes people giving their ethnicity as "New Zealander". English was spoken by 97.6%, Māori language by 1.4%, Samoan by 0.3% and other languages by 9.4%. No language could be spoken by 1.5% (e.g. too young to talk). New Zealand Sign Language was known by 0.4%. The percentage of people born overseas was 18.6, compared with 28.8% nationally.

Religious affiliations were 36.4% Christian, 0.9% Hindu, 0.5% Islam, 0.2% Māori religious beliefs, 0.5% Buddhist, 0.6% New Age, 0.1% Jewish, and 1.1% other religions. People who answered that they had no religion were 51.8%, and 8.1% of people did not answer the census question.

Of those at least 15 years old, 2,262 (11.6%) people had a bachelor's or higher degree, 10,641 (54.7%) had a post-high school certificate or diploma, and 5,844 (30.1%) people exclusively held high school qualifications. The median income was $34,900, compared with $41,500 nationally. 1,311 people (6.7%) earned over $100,000 compared to 12.1% nationally. The employment status of those at least 15 was that 9,210 (47.4%) people were employed full-time, 2,748 (14.1%) were part-time, and 333 (1.7%) were unemployed.

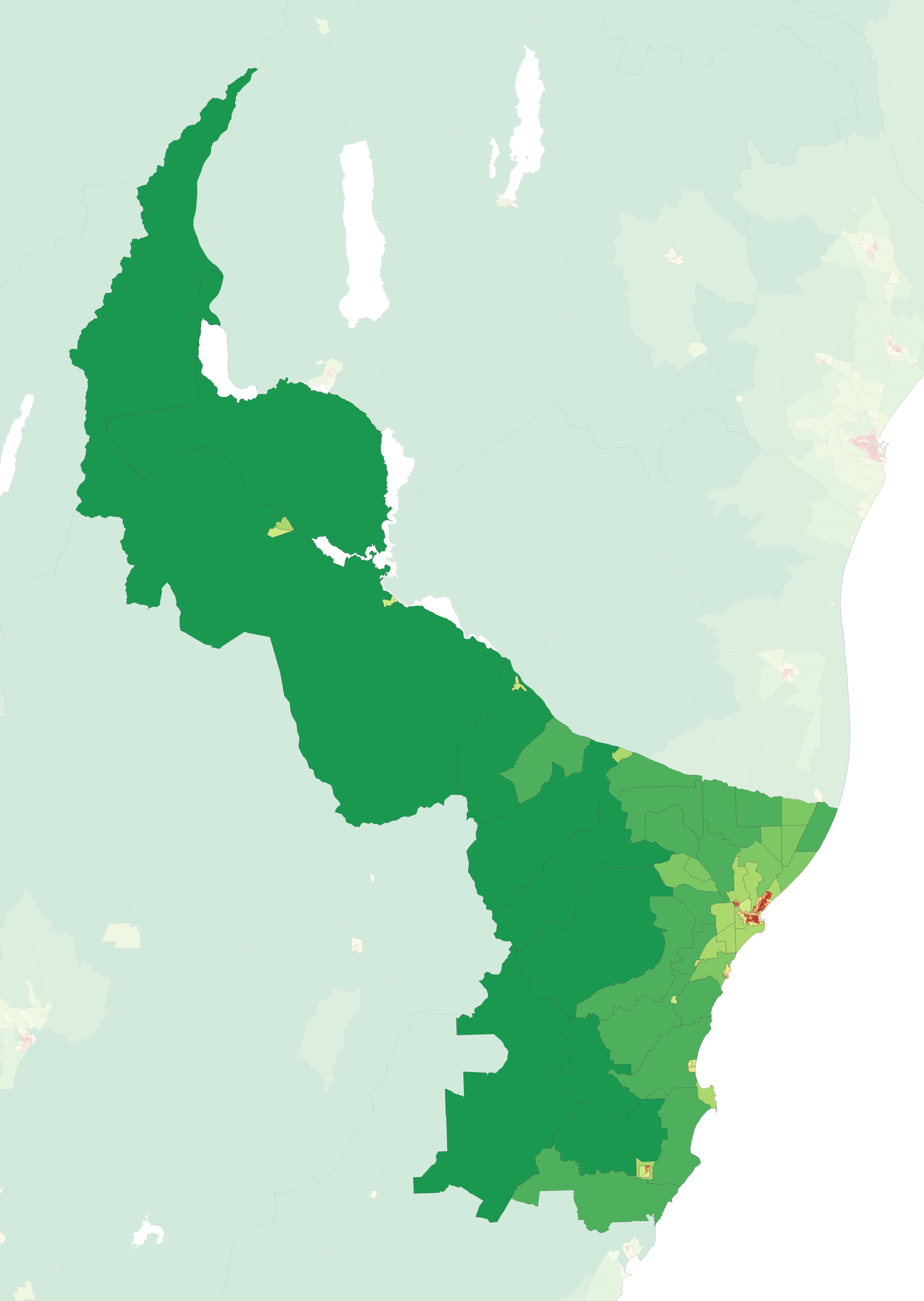
Population density in the 2023 census

Individual wards (2018 boundaries)
Name	Area (km^{2})	Population	Density (per km^{2})	Dwellings	Median age	Median income
Ahuriri Ward	4,195.39	1,899	0.45	900	46.6 years	$39,100
Oamaru Ward	38.55	14,499	376.11	6,069	46.3 years	$33,200
Waihemo Ward	1,321.15	2,511	1.90	1,137	50.2 years	$32,400
Corriedale Ward	1,552.85	4,560	2.94	1,869	43.2 years	$41,300
New Zealand					38.1 years	$41,500

== Economy ==
A relatively sparsely settled area, the District has a large number of farms. However, in recent times (late 2000s), numerous proposals for new farming operations have locals fearing that the agriculture will be transformed from often family-held farms to large agribusiness operations, causing local ecological damage and siphoning off capital overseas. The district also supports viticulture in the Waitaki Valley wine region, where vines were first planted in 2001. Pinot noir is the predominant grape variety, alongside pinot gris, riesling and chardonnay. Vineyards occupy limestone slopes and river gravels containing greywacke and schist. Early vineyard developments included Clos Ostler, planted with pinot noir in 2002.
