= Maheno, New Zealand =

Maheno
- Rural settlement
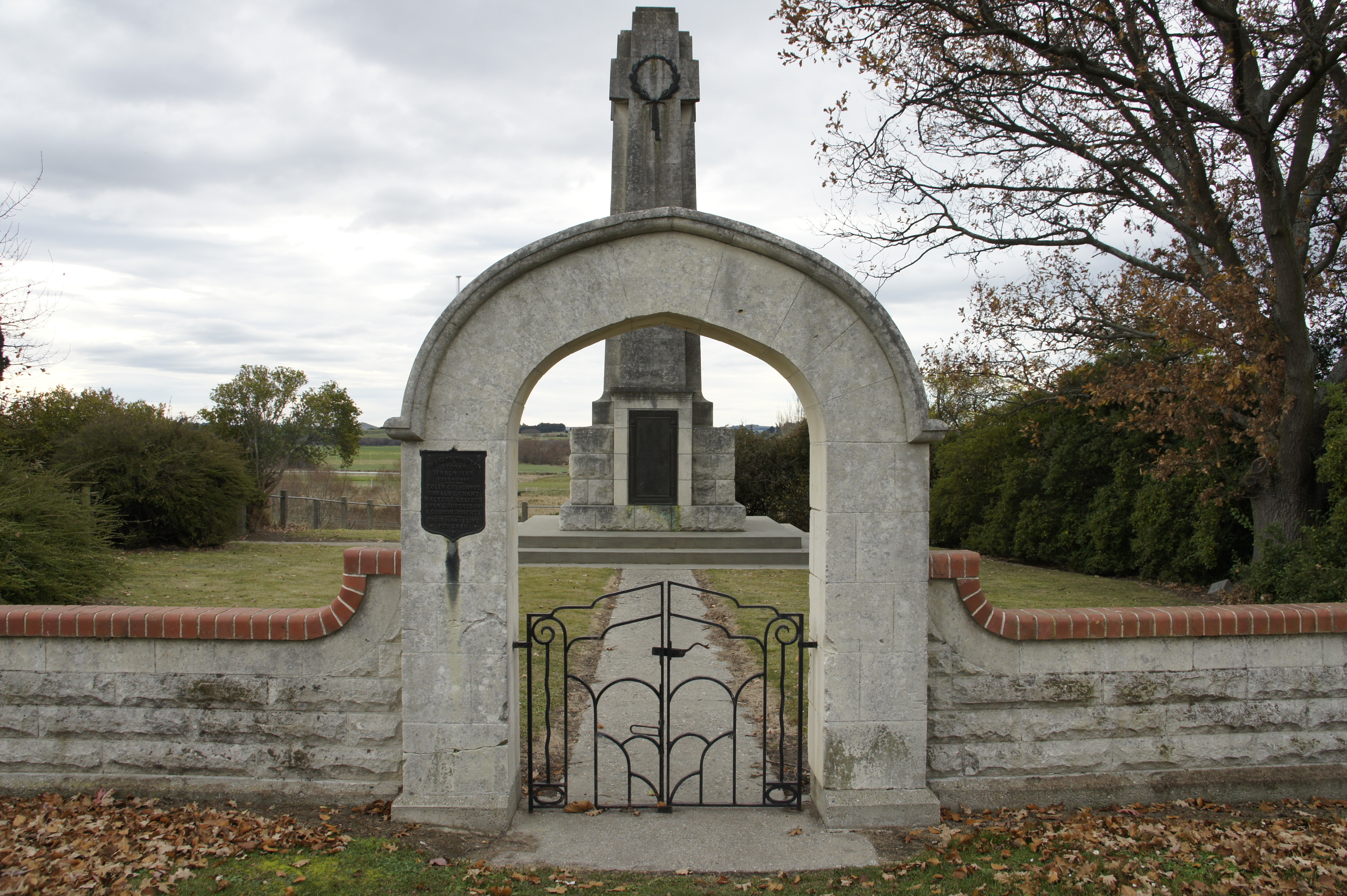
- Maheno war memorial
- Interactive map of Maheno
- Coordinates: 45°10′S 170°50′E
- Country: New Zealand
- Region: Otago
- Territorial authority: Waitaki District
- Ward: Corriedale Ward
- Electorates: Waitaki; Te Tai Tonga (Māori)

Government
  - Territorial authority: Waitaki District Council
  - Regional council: Otago Regional Council
  - Mayor of Waitaki: Melanie Tavendale
  - Waitaki MP: Miles Anderson
  - Te Tai Tonga MP: Mananui Ramsden

Area
  - Total: 0.56 km^{2} (0.22 sq mi)

Population (June 2025)
  - Total: 120
  - Density: 210/km^{2} (550/sq mi)
- Local iwi: Ngāi Tahu

Maheno is a small North Otago township south of Oamaru in New Zealand. The area has 75 residents. A number of the town's streets are named after places in Tyne and Wear, England, such as Whickham, Felling, Heworth and Jarrow. One of two New Zealand's hospital ships in World War I, the SS Maheno, was named after this town.

== Demographics ==
Maheno is described as a rural settlement by Statistics New Zealand, and covers 0.56 km^{2} (0.22 sq mi). It had an estimated population of 120 as of June 2025, with a population density of 214 people per km^{2}. It is part of the Maheno statistical area.

Historical population for Maheno settlement
Year	Pop.	±% p.a.
2006	144	—
2013	108	−4.03%
2018	126	+3.13%
2023	111	−2.50%

Maheno had a population of 111 in the 2023 New Zealand census, a decrease of 15 people (−11.9%) since the 2018 census, and an increase of 3 people (2.8%) since the 2013 census. There were 54 males and 54 females in 54 dwellings. The median age was 57.5 years (compared with 38.1 years nationally). There were 6 people (5.4%) aged under 15 years, 12 (10.8%) aged 15 to 29, 60 (54.1%) aged 30 to 64, and 30 (27.0%) aged 65 or older.

People could identify as more than one ethnicity. The results were 91.9% European (Pākehā), 8.1% Māori, 2.7% Pasifika, and 2.7% Asian. English was spoken by 100.0%, Samoan by 2.7%, and other languages by 8.1%. No language could be spoken by 2.7% (e.g. too young to talk). The percentage of people born overseas was 18.9, compared with 28.8% nationally.

Religious affiliations were 40.5% Christian, and 2.7% other religions. People who answered that they had no religion were 43.2%, and 16.2% of people did not answer the census question.

Of those at least 15 years old, 9 (8.6%) people had a bachelor's or higher degree, 60 (57.1%) had a post-high school certificate or diploma, and 39 (37.1%) people exclusively held high school qualifications. The median income was $24,700, compared with $41,500 nationally. The employment status of those at least 15 was 45 (42.9%) full-time and 15 (14.3%) part-time.

=== Maheno statistical area ===
Maheno statistical area, which also includes Kakanui and Herbert, covers 262.45 km^{2} (101.33 sq mi) and had an estimated population of 2,100 as of June 2025, with a population density of 8 people per km^{2}.

Historical population for Maheno statistical area
Year	Pop.	±% p.a.
2006	1,875	—
2013	1,818	−0.44%
2018	1,968	+1.60%
2023	2,052	+0.84%

Maheno statistical area had a population of 2,052 in the 2023 New Zealand census, an increase of 84 people (4.3%) since the 2018 census, and an increase of 234 people (12.9%) since the 2013 census. There were 1,035 males, 1,005 females, and 12 people of other genders in 876 dwellings. 1.9% of people identified as LGBTIQ+. The median age was 52.2 years (compared with 38.1 years nationally). There were 318 people (15.5%) aged under 15 years, 219 (10.7%) aged 15 to 29, 999 (48.7%) aged 30 to 64, and 519 (25.3%) aged 65 or older.

People could identify as more than one ethnicity. The results were 93.1% European (Pākehā); 6.3% Māori; 1.8% Pasifika; 4.1% Asian; 0.1% Middle Eastern, Latin American and African New Zealanders (MELAA); and 3.7% other, which includes people giving their ethnicity as "New Zealander". English was spoken by 98.7%, Māori by 1.0%, Samoan by 0.1%, and other languages by 6.9%. No language could be spoken by 0.9% (e.g. too young to talk). New Zealand Sign Language was known by 0.1%. The percentage of people born overseas was 14.6, compared with 28.8% nationally.

Religious affiliations were 31.9% Christian, 0.1% Islam, 0.6% New Age, and 0.7% other religions. People who answered that they had no religion were 58.9%, and 7.6% of people did not answer the census question.

Of those at least 15 years old, 327 (18.9%) people had a bachelor's or higher degree, 957 (55.2%) had a post-high school certificate or diploma, and 447 (25.8%) people exclusively held high school qualifications. The median income was $36,100, compared with $41,500 nationally. 144 people (8.3%) earned over $100,000 compared to 12.1% nationally. The employment status of those at least 15 was 822 (47.4%) full-time, 276 (15.9%) part-time, and 24 (1.4%) unemployed.

== St Andrew's Maheno ==
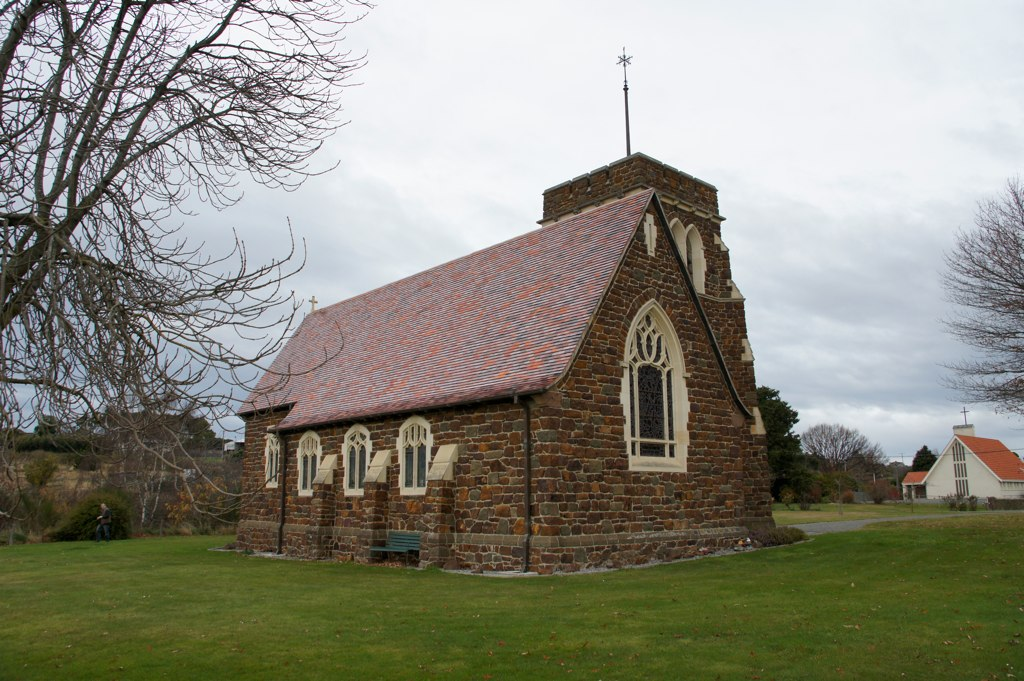
St Andrew's Church in Maheno

St Andrew's Church in Maheno is part of the Anglican Parish of Oamaru-Maheno. Services are held every Sunday at 9am, apart from in January.

== Maheno rugby ==
Maheno
Club information
- Full name: Maheno Rugby Football Club
- Colours: Green and Black
- Founded: 1898
- Website: No current website

Current details
- Ground: Maheno Domain
- Competition: Citizens Shield

The Maheno Rugby Football Club play their home games at the Maheno Domain. The Maheno domain is situated along Kakanui Valley road, in Maheno.

== Maheno School ==
Maheno School is a full primary which caters for years 1 to 8 with a roll of 92 as of July 2026.

Maheno School opened on 11 October 1875, to the delight of many local parents. Peter Williams donated the valuable site in the centre of the town, while £150 had been locally subscribed to add to the £325 granted by the Government. The architect was Thomas Forrester, and Robert Peattie became the first teacher from 14 applicants.

On the opening day fifty children were enrolled, and by mid-1876 the school roll stood at 72 pupils.

The school went through numerous improvements starting with an additional classroom in 1883. By 1907 the school needed a third classroom to cope with a growing roll.

- 1946 – The main block of the new school was built
- 1957 – The school swimming pool was built
- 1960 – The infant block was built
- 1963 – The school dental clinic opened
- 2013 – Work started on new main office and library refit

In 2013 principal Murray Nelson retired after 21 years heading the school.

In 2015, 2017 and 2019 school pupils have visited the wreck of the SS Maheno which is situated on Fraser Island, in Queensland, Australia.
