= Ngapara and Tokarahi Branches =

Ngapara & Tokarahi Branches

Overview
- Other name(s): Livingstone Branch Taylor's Siding Waiareka Industrial Line
- Status: Closed
- Locale: Otago, New Zealand
- Termini: Waiareka Junction; Ngapara & Tokarahi

Service
- Type: Heavy Rail
- System: New Zealand Government Railways (NZGR)
- Services: 2

History
- Opened: 1 April 1877 to Ngapara
- Tokarahi branch opens: 8 July 1887
- Tokarahi branch closed: 1930
- Closed beyond Cormacks: 14 July 1959
- Closed: September 1997

Technical
- Number of tracks: Single
- Character: Rural
- Track gauge: 3 ft 6 in (1,067 mm)

Map

The Ngapara and Tokarahi Branches were two connected railway branch lines in northern Otago, New Zealand, part of the national rail network. The Ngapara Branch opened in 1877 and almost all of it closed in 1959; the remaining few kilometres, called the Waiareka Industrial Line, were removed in 1997. The Tokarahi Branch branched off the Ngapara Branch. It operated from 1887 until 1930 and was originally known as the Livingstone Branch, though it never progressed beyond Tokarahi to Livingstone. In early 2008 there is a proposal to reinstate the first 4.5 km of the Ngapara Branch.

== Construction ==
In the early 1870s, residents in the Waiareka Valley inland from Oamaru started petitioning for a railway connection to the coast to provide easier access to farmland and to export agricultural produce and limestone. The provincial government granted approval for a line to Ngapara in 1872, with construction commencing during the first half of 1874. The Public Works Department began running trains on the line during 1876, but construction was hampered by delays and other problems, including an incident in May 1876 when two died after a contractor's locomotive exploded. On 1 April 1877 the 24.34-kilometre line from Waiareka Junction on the Main South Line opened to Ngapara. The junction points faced south, away from Oamaru, because north-facing points would have required an excessively sharp curve.

In June 1879, construction of a side branch from Windsor Junction on the Ngapara Branch to Tokarahi began, and through the economic depression of the 1880s building the line was used to provide unemployment relief. The 19.22-kilometre line opened on 8 July 1887. There were proposals that the two branches be extended to join the Kurow Branch, but they were abandoned without any progress made.

== Stations ==
Station	Distance (in km)	Notes
Ngapara Branch
Waiareka Junction	0.00	
Weston	2.58	Site of McDonald Limeworks.
siding	4.6	To Taylor's Limeworks.
Cornacks	4.74	The original Cornacks loop was 300 m closer to Weston.
Lorne	6.4	Loop removed in 1949.
Enfield	8.43	Originally known as Teaneraki.
Elderslie	11.93	
Windsor Junction	16.52	Originally Windsor before the construction of the Tokarahi Branch; remained Windsor Junction even after it ceased to be a junction.
Corriedale	18	
Queens Flat	21.48	
Ngapara	24.34	
Tokarahi Branch
Windsor Junction	0.00	
Tapui		
Island Cliff		
Tokarahi	19.22	

== Operation ==
Once the Tokarahi Branch opened, the two lines employed some inventive working. Each morning mixed trains from the two termini met at Windsor Junction, where they were marshalled into a passenger train to Oamaru and a slower goods train. The reverse of this took place in the afternoon. Although the two branches were set up to open up country and provide transport for farmland, the freight on the line was not purely agricultural: a coal mine and, at the turn of the 20th century, a flour mill were located in Ngapara, and limestone for both building blocks and agricultural uses was loaded from quarries along the line. Enfield had a ballast pit until the late 1940s or early 1950s, used to supply materials for the protection of Oamaru's foreshore.

In the early days, motive power included the F^{A} class, which were stationed in Ngapara and were known to haul the passenger train from Windsor Junction to Oamaru prior to 1918. Other classes utilised included the P, T, U^{B}, U^{C}, W^{D}, and W^{F}. T class are known to have operated to Tokarahi into the 1920s.

The Ngapara and Tokarahi Branches were some of the first in the country to lose their passenger services, in December 1926, when buses replaced trains in an attempt to stem increasing financial losses. In 1927, Ngapara's locomotive depot closed and trains operated from Oamaru. The Tokarahi Branch closed on 14 July 1930. This was due at least in part to the decline in wheat farming; at the start of the 20th century, thousands of acres of the crop were grown in the region, but by the 1920s it was no longer a significant commodity.

After the closure of the Tokarahi Branch, freight trains ran thrice weekly to Ngapara, typically on Tuesdays, Thursdays and Saturdays. They departed Oamaru at 7:30am and arrived at Ngapara at 9:40am. The return working departed Ngapara at 10:30am, reaching Oamaru at 1:30pm. By 1951 trains ran on Tuesdays and Thursdays, except for services to the limeworks 4.74 kilometres from the junction with the main line, which provided a few hundred tonnes of freight daily. In 1958, regular services were cancelled and trains ran only when required, restricted to 10 km/h due to the poor condition of the track. Financial losses and the prohibitive cost of repairs meant that closure of the line past the limeworks came on 31 July 1959; despite local protests to keep the line open, the final train departed Ngapara behind A^{B} 783. This class and the A were the mainstay of motive power on the branch for its final 25 years. The branch was truncated to Cormacks from August 1959 and was known as Taylor's Siding after the business it served, Taylor's Limeworks. In the 1990s the branch was renamed the Waiareka Industrial Line. The lime works continued to provide traffic until 1997, with shunt services from Oamaru usually hauled by a DSC class shunting locomotive. The siding closed in late 1997, and the track was lifted in 1999.

== Today ==
Traces of the Ngapara and Tokarahi Branches survive remarkably well. The old formation is often very distinct: rails are still embedded into the road surface at Weston, the Enfield station building and goods shed have been moved into a paddock and are in good repair, Corriedale yard is well preserved with the 11-mile peg still in place, and both Tokarahi branch tunnels survive, on private land. In Tokarahi very little remains of the terminus, but in Ngapara some rails remain embedded in tar seal where the backshunt crossed the highway, the loading bank and platform edge survive, and the old station sign is affixed to the local rugby club's rooms. The old flour mill that once provided traffic for the railway is also still present in the town.

Since 2008 there has been an annual "Over The Tunnels" recreational run/ride of the Tokarahi Branch organised by Waitaki Girls High School. The event consists of a half marathon and a cycle ride along the route of the line. The events have attracted hundreds of participants.

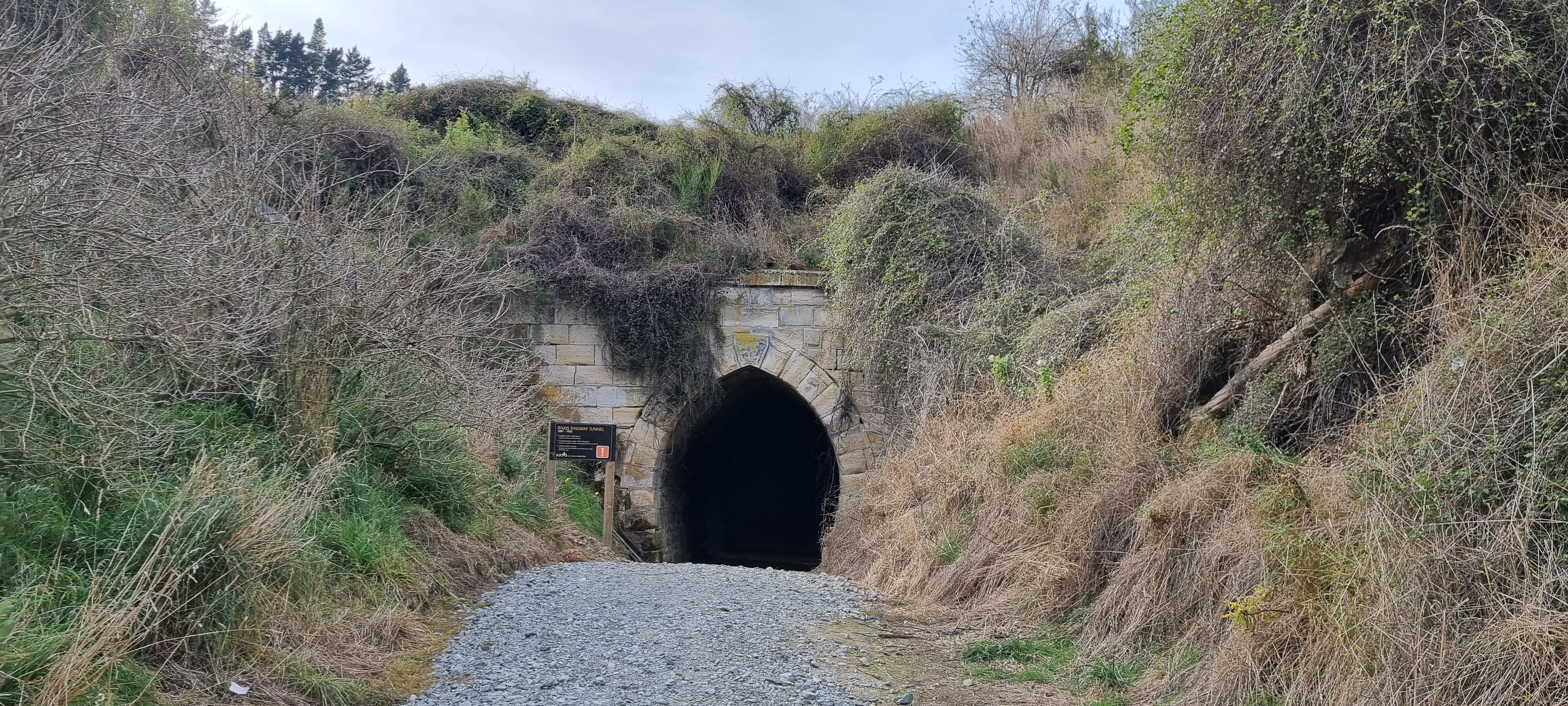
Rakis Railway Tunnel (2024)

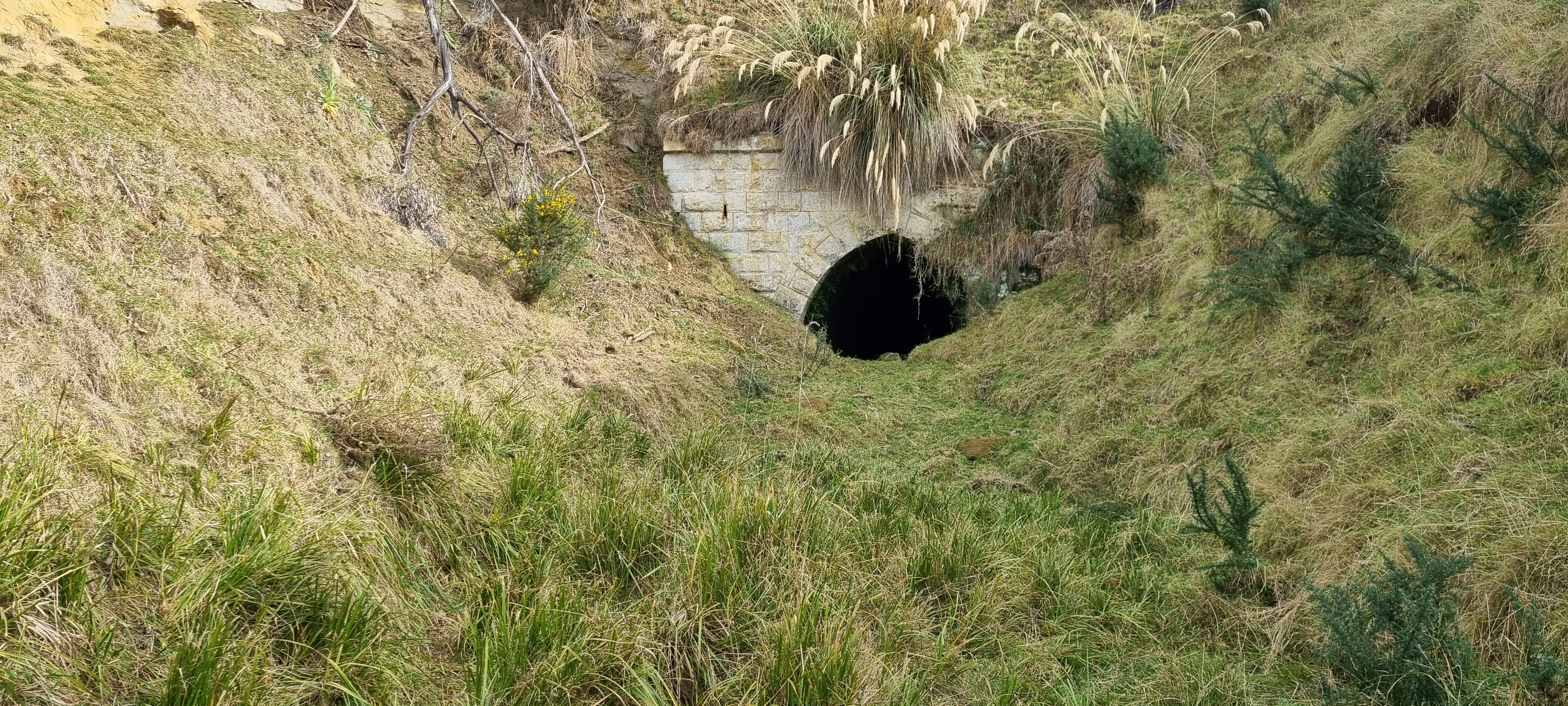
Tapui Tunnel (2024)

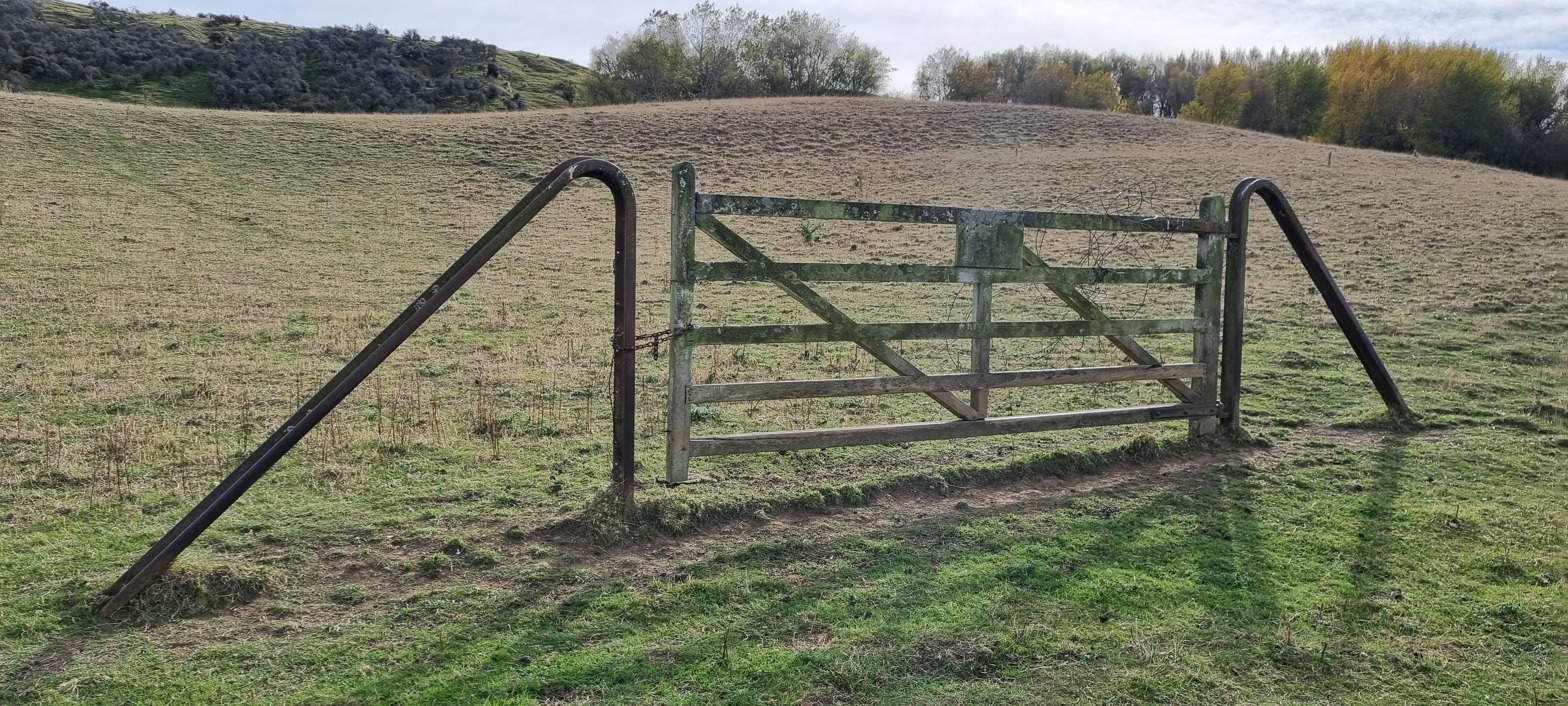
Railway gate on the Tokarahi Branch Line (2024)

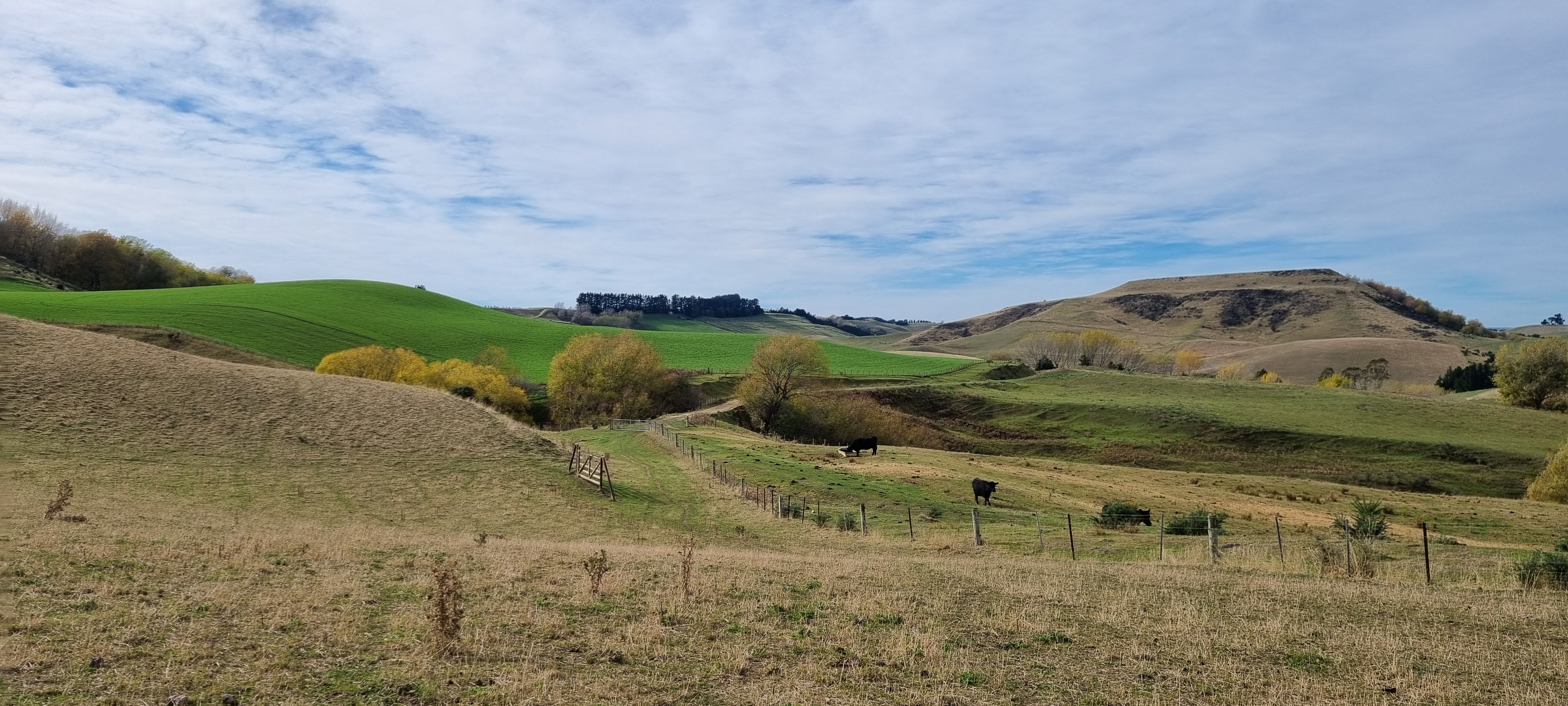
Section of the Tokarahi Branch Line with railway gate (2024)

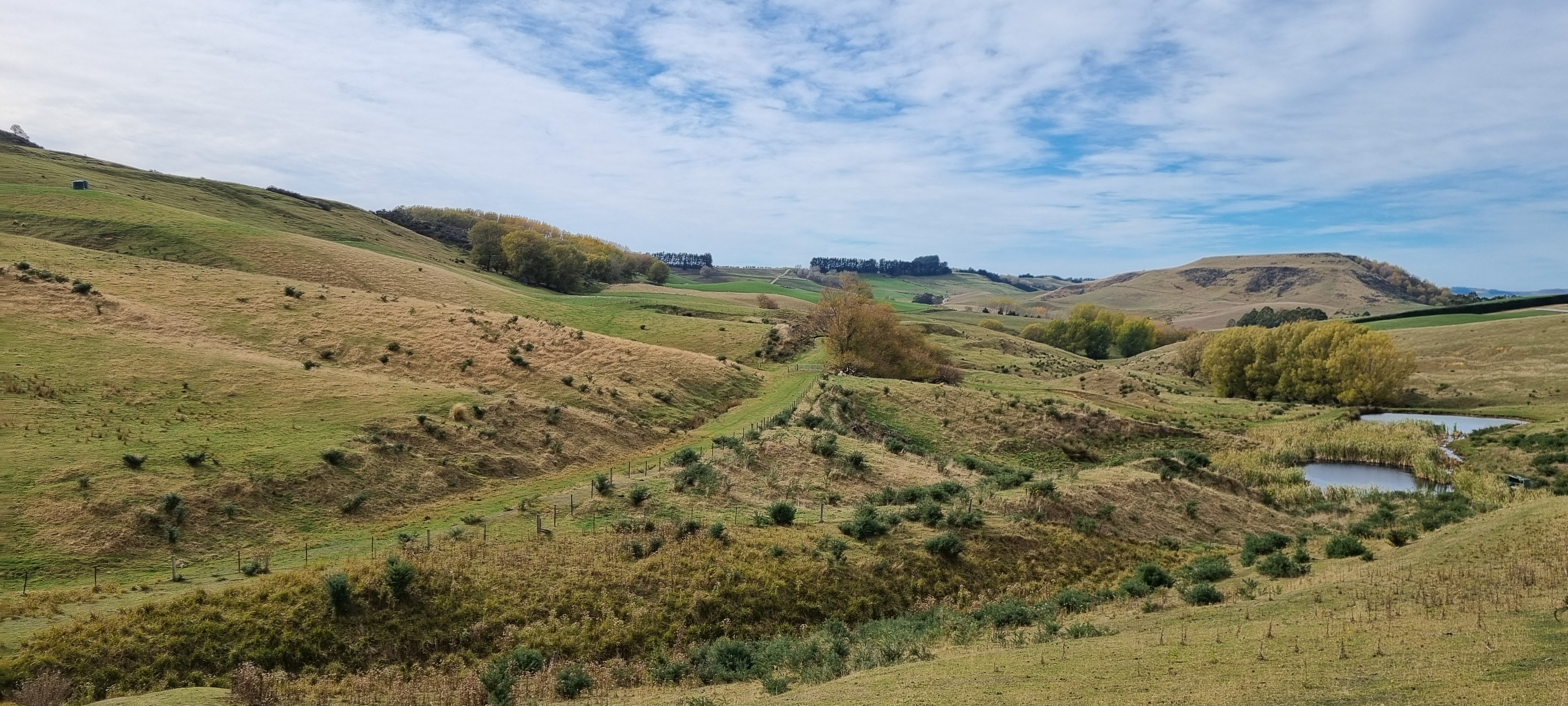
Section of the Tokarahi Branch Line before the Tapui Tunnel (looking back towards Rakis Table) (2024)

== Alps to Ocean Cycle Trail ==
The final section of the Alps to Ocean cycle trail (from Duntroon to Oamaru) follows these two branchlines in places.

The cycle trail follows beside the Karara Creek and intersects the Tokarahi - Windsor line at a point approx 4km from Tokarahi, and 1km from the Tokarahi-Ngapara Road. Trail, creek and railway formation run roughly parallel for a kilometre before creek and trail diverge, although the formation can be observed for most of the next kilometre. Approximately 5km further the trail drops down Tunnel Road to the western portal of the Rakis Tunnel and follows (mostly on) the formation for six or seven kilometres to a point about 1.5km short of the junction at Windsor.

After leaving Enfield (on the Ngapara Branchline) the cycle trail follows on the railway embankment for about 1km (including a significant bridge) until rejoining the Weston-Ngapara Road. The trail again follows on the railway formation from east of the lime works at McCormacks, through Weston, to a point about 200m short of the former junction with the Main South Line at Waiareka.

== Reinstatement proposal ==
In August 2006 a proposal was made to reinstate the first 4.5 km of the branch. Weston is under consideration as the location for a cement works, and if chosen, the harbour in either Timaru or Port Chalmers would be used for export purposes. The company intending to establish the cement works, Holcim, has stated a strong preference to use rail transport between the cement works and harbour and thus would seek to restore the line to Weston. The rail corridor is still owned by ONTRACK and the proposal would involve the operation of at least two trains each way daily. The rail corridor was designated as "closed" in the Waitaki District Council's district plan. ONTRACK asserted that this is a clerical error and has filed with the Environment Court in September 2007 to have the status corrected so that the railway can be reinstated. The Waiareka Valley Preservation Society (WVPS), whose existence is premised upon opposition to Holcim's proposal, has challenged ONTRACK and filed with the Environment Court to have the railway's reinstatement declared to be in contravention of the Resource Management Act 1991. The railway's reinstatement was critical to the Holcim proposal as access to rail transport was crucial to transport the cement. On 2 November 2007 the case went before the Environment Court, and Judge Jeff Smith and commissioner Sheila Watson reserved their decision and the matter may not be resolved before Christmas 2007. The Commissioners granted a consent for the cement works on 11 February 2008, but this was challenged by the WVPS, who sub sequentially won an appeal in the Environment Court, requiring the re-opening of the branch line to be notified. As of December 2009 the cement works project remains under consideration. A decision on the cement works proposal is expected to occur in August or September 2010. If the project goes ahead, a sand quarry will be established at Windsor, directly adjacent to the old Tokarahi Branch, with access along the old railway formation. There will also be an opencast coal mine at Ngapara, while the cement works and limestone quarry will be built close to the former Taylors limeworks at Cormacks. In August 2013, Holcim announced that the project was on hold indefinitely.
