= Weston, New Zealand =

Weston
- Town
- Interactive map of Weston
- Coordinates: 45°05′S 170°55′E
- Country: New Zealand
- Region: Otago
- Territorial authority: Waitaki District
- Ward: Oamaru Ward
- Electorates: Waitaki; Te Tai Tonga (Māori)

Government
  - Territorial authority: Waitaki District Council
  - Regional council: Otago Regional Council
  - Mayor of Waitaki: Melanie Tavendale
  - Waitaki MP: Miles Anderson
  - Te Tai Tonga MP: Mananui Ramsden

Area
  - Total: 2.00 km^{2} (0.77 sq mi)

Population (June 2025)
  - Total: 1,250
  - Density: 625/km^{2} (1,620/sq mi)
- Local iwi: Ngāi Tahu

Weston is a town situated 5 km (3.1 mi) inland from Oamaru, South Island, New Zealand. It is regarded as one of the more affluent towns of the Waitaki District and had an estimated population of 1,250 in June 2025.

The town is serviced by a local fire station staffed by volunteers, Four Square chain supermarket, Weston Community Church and the local Weston co-educational primary school.

As with the surrounding areas in North Otago, agriculture is an important economic activity.

== Limestone and cement ==
Weston is home to the largest Oamaru stone quarry in New Zealand, supplying New Zealand and exporting much overseas. The quarry lies a further mile inland from Weston along the Weston/Ngapara Road, so its daily operation is not noticed by Weston residents.

International cement manufacturer Holcim has gained consent to open a cement plant near Weston, involving further limestone quarrying. The application prompted the founding of the Waiareka Preservation Society, which opposes the planned plant. Society members are worried how potential extra traffic through the township would impact on roading infrastructure. However, Holcim has stated a preference for rail transport between the cement works and harbour and would seek to reopen the line to Weston.

The Weston operations were formerly operated by Taylor's Limeworks, a subsidiary of Holcim. Taylor's Limeworks consolidated their operations at Mākareao (Dunback) in 1990 with the opening of a new plant there. The limeworks at Weston were then sold to Parkside Quarries Ltd, who continue to mine lime and Oamaru stone at two sites. If the Weston Cement Works development goes ahead, new lime/tuff quarries will be established at the western edge of Parkside's operations. The cement works will be on land immediately west of the old Taylor's works at Cormacks.

== Demographics ==
Weston statistical area, which includes Waiareka Junction, covers 2.00 km^{2} (0.77 sq mi) and had an estimated population of 1,250 as of June 2025, with a population density of 625 people per km^{2}.

Historical population
Year	Pop.	±% p.a.
2006	897	—
2013	951	+0.84%
2018	1,008	+1.17%
2023	1,188	+3.34%
The 2006 population is for a larger area of 3.31 km^{2}. Source:

Weston had a population of 1,188 in the 2023 New Zealand census, an increase of 180 people (17.9%) since the 2018 census, and an increase of 237 people (24.9%) since the 2013 census. There were 603 males and 582 females in 468 dwellings. 0.8% of people identified as LGBTIQ+. The median age was 46.9 years (compared with 38.1 years nationally). There were 216 people (18.2%) aged under 15 years, 153 (12.9%) aged 15 to 29, 525 (44.2%) aged 30 to 64, and 291 (24.5%) aged 65 or older.

People could identify as more than one ethnicity. The results were 94.9% European (Pākehā), 8.3% Māori, 1.3% Pasifika, 3.5% Asian, and 1.5% other, which includes people giving their ethnicity as "New Zealander". English was spoken by 96.7%, Māori by 0.8%, and other languages by 4.5%. No language could be spoken by 2.3% (e.g. too young to talk). The percentage of people born overseas was 8.8, compared with 28.8% nationally.

Religious affiliations were 32.3% Christian, 0.3% Hindu, 0.3% Islam, 0.3% Buddhist, 0.5% New Age, and 0.8% other religions. People who answered that they had no religion were 58.1%, and 7.3% of people did not answer the census question.

Of those at least 15 years old, 132 (13.6%) people had a bachelor's or higher degree, 603 (62.0%) had a post-high school certificate or diploma, and 237 (24.4%) people exclusively held high school qualifications. The median income was $41,000, compared with $41,500 nationally. 78 people (8.0%) earned over $100,000 compared to 12.1% nationally. The employment status of those at least 15 was 489 (50.3%) full-time, 123 (12.7%) part-time, and 9 (0.9%) unemployed.

== Leisure and recreation ==
Weston has some of the largest sporting grounds in the Oamaru region, with the Weston Domain having a full size cricket oval, tennis courts, football, and two rugby union fields, accompanied by a large pavilion and public park/recreation area, and is the home to the Valley Sports Club.

Rockvale Venue Room & Gardens serve the area as a function and wedding venue hire with accommodations in quiet rural surroundings with large formal gardens.

== Transport ==
Weston is connected to State Highway 1 south via Whiterocks Road and to State Highway 83 via Airedale and Horse Gully Road.

== Ngapara Branch railway ==
Weston was the first stop on the defunct Ngapara Branch railway. Built in 1871 to open up the 64300 hectares (159,000 acres). After closure of the branch in July 1959, the first five km remained as Taylor's Siding, serving Taylor's Limeworks and being renamed "the Waiareka Industrial Line", the line closed in 1997 and the rails were uplifted due to low traffic and deteriorating of the track and sleepers. In August 2006, a proposal was made to re-open the first 4.5 km of the branch through Weston. If the proposed cement works eventuates, either the harbour at Timaru or Port Chalmers would be used for shipping purposes. The rail corridor is still owned by ONTRACK and the proposal would involve the operation of at least two trains each way daily.

The surviving portion of the land rail corridor between Waiareka Junction and Parkside Quarries currently forms part of the Alps to Ocean Cycle Trail linking Weston to Oamaru.

== Education ==
Weston School is a full primary catering for years 1 to 8 with a roll of 243 as of July 2026. The school opened in 1869.
