= Maruakoa =

Farming community in New Zealand

Coordinates: 45°02′S 170°45′E

Maruakoa is a small farming settlement in Waitaki District, New Zealand. It is located close to the banks of the Kakanui River just south of its emergence form the Kakanui Gorge. It is 18 kilometres northwest of Oamaru and 4 kilometres southwest of Windsor, between the two settlements of Five Forks and Tapui. The name Maruakoa is a Māori word literally meaning "Happy valley" (from marua, valley, and koa, glad).

The main features of Maruaoka are a road bridge which connects the settlement with the main route through the Kakanui valley, and an old stone building which was the settlement's former school. The school was opened in 1912 but closed just six years later when a school was built in nearby Five Forks. The Kakanui River passes over the small Clifton Falls immediately downstream from Maruakoa.
