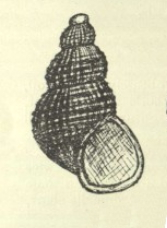
- Shell of Alvania awamoaensis (holotype)

Scientific classification
- Kingdom: Animalia
- Phylum: Mollusca
- Class: Gastropoda
- Subclass: Caenogastropoda
- Order: Littorinimorpha
- Superfamily: Rissooidea
- Family: Rissoidae
- Genus: Alvania
- Species: †A. awamoaensis

Binomial name
- †Alvania awamoaensis (H. J. Finlay, 1924)

Synonyms
- † Alvania (Linemera) awamoaensis (H. J. Finlay, 1924)· alternate representation; † Linemera awamoaensis Finlay, 1924

= Alvania awamoaensis =

Species of gastropod

Alvania awamoaensis is an extinct species of minute sea snail, a marine gastropod mollusc or micromollusk in the family Rissoidae.

== Description ==
The length of the shell attains 2.1 mm, its diameter 1.1 mm.

== Distribution ==
Fossils of this species were found in Tertiary strata on Awamoa, North Otago, New Zealand
