= Kia ora (disambiguation) =

Kia ora is a Māori language greeting which has entered New Zealand English.

Kia Ora may also refer to:

== Australia ==
- Kia-Ora, a brand of concentrated fruit drink developed in Sydney
- Kia Ora, Queensland, Australia, a locality in the Gympie Region
- Kia Ora Stud, a Thoroughbred horse stud situated near Scone in New South Wales, Australia

== New Zealand ==
- Kia Ora, New Zealand, a locality in North Otago, New Zealand
- Kia Ora FM, a radio station in Manawatū, New Zealand
- Kia Ora Incident, concerning usage of the Māori greeting

== See also ==
- Keora (disambiguation)
