= Pleasant River (New Zealand) =

River in New Zealand

- Route of Pleasant River
- Mouth of Pleasant River Pleasant River (New Zealand) (South Island)

Location
- Country: New Zealand

Physical characteristics
- Source: Mount Trotter
  - coordinates: 45°30′08″S 170°34′13″E
- Mouth
  - location: Pacific Ocean
  - coordinates: 45°34′04″S 170°43′38″E

Basin features
- Progression: Pleasant River → Pacific Ocean
- Tributaries
  - right: Trotters Creek, Watkin Creek

The Pleasant River is in the Otago region of New Zealand. It rises in hilly forested country near Mount Trotter, west of Palmerston, fed by many small streams. After flowing generally eastward, the river turns south about 2 kilometres (1.2 mi) south of Palmerston, passes the settlement of Wairunga, and enters the sea via an estuary midway between Shag Point and Waikouaiti.

The mouth of the Pleasant River forms the administrative border between the Waitaki District and Dunedin City.
