= Keora =

Keora may refer to:

- Plants in the genus Pandanus
- Keora, Ghana, Nzérékoré Prefecture, Ghana
- Keora caste, India

== See also ==
- Kia ora (disambiguation)
