= Jim Hopkins =

New Zealand broadcaster, writer and politician (1946-2026)

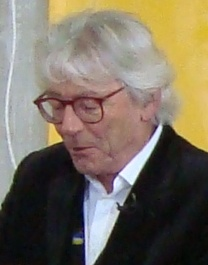
Hopkins in 2009

James Arthur Hopkins (9 December 1946 – 27 July 2026) was a New Zealand broadcaster, writer and local politician. Known for his work in television, radio and theatre, he later served as a district councillor for Banks Peninsula and Waitaki.

== Life and career ==
Hopkins was scriptwriter for Close to Home, presenter of Fast Forward, Don't Tell Me, The Inventors, Dateline Monday, a performer on The BNZ Festival Debates, and radio talkback host on Radio Pacific in Auckland and Radio Avon in Christchurch.

In August 1998, Hopkins released his first book, Blokes & Sheds, which hit number one on the New Zealand sales list after only a week. The book profiles amateur inventors from across New Zealand. Hopkins followed it up with another book, Inventions from the Shed, in 1999, and a 5-part film documentary series with the same name that featured inventors across Australia.

He served for four terms as a councillor on the Banks Peninsula District Council before moving to Waitaki.

Hopkins was elected as a councillor for the Waitaki District Council, based in Oamaru, in 2007, and became Deputy Mayor in 2010. In July 2013 he announced his intention to stand for the mayoralty in the local body elections to be held later in the year.

He remained a councillor up until his death on 27 July 2026, at the age of 79.

== See also ==
- List of New Zealand television personalities
