= Macraes =

Macraes Oti
- Town
- Location within New Zealand
- Coordinates: 45°22′54″S 170°25′48″E
- Country: New Zealand
- Region: Otago
- Territorial authority: Waitaki District
- Time zone: UTC+12 (NZST)
  - Summer (DST): UTC+13 (NZDT)
- Local iwi: Ngāi Tahu

Macraes, formerly known as Macraes Flat, and known in Māori as Oti, is a town in the Waitaki District in Otago, New Zealand. It is known as a mining town, with a long history of gold extraction. The town sits 55 km north of Dunedin in New Zealand's South Island.

The Macraes Mine, New Zealand's largest gold mine, is nearby.

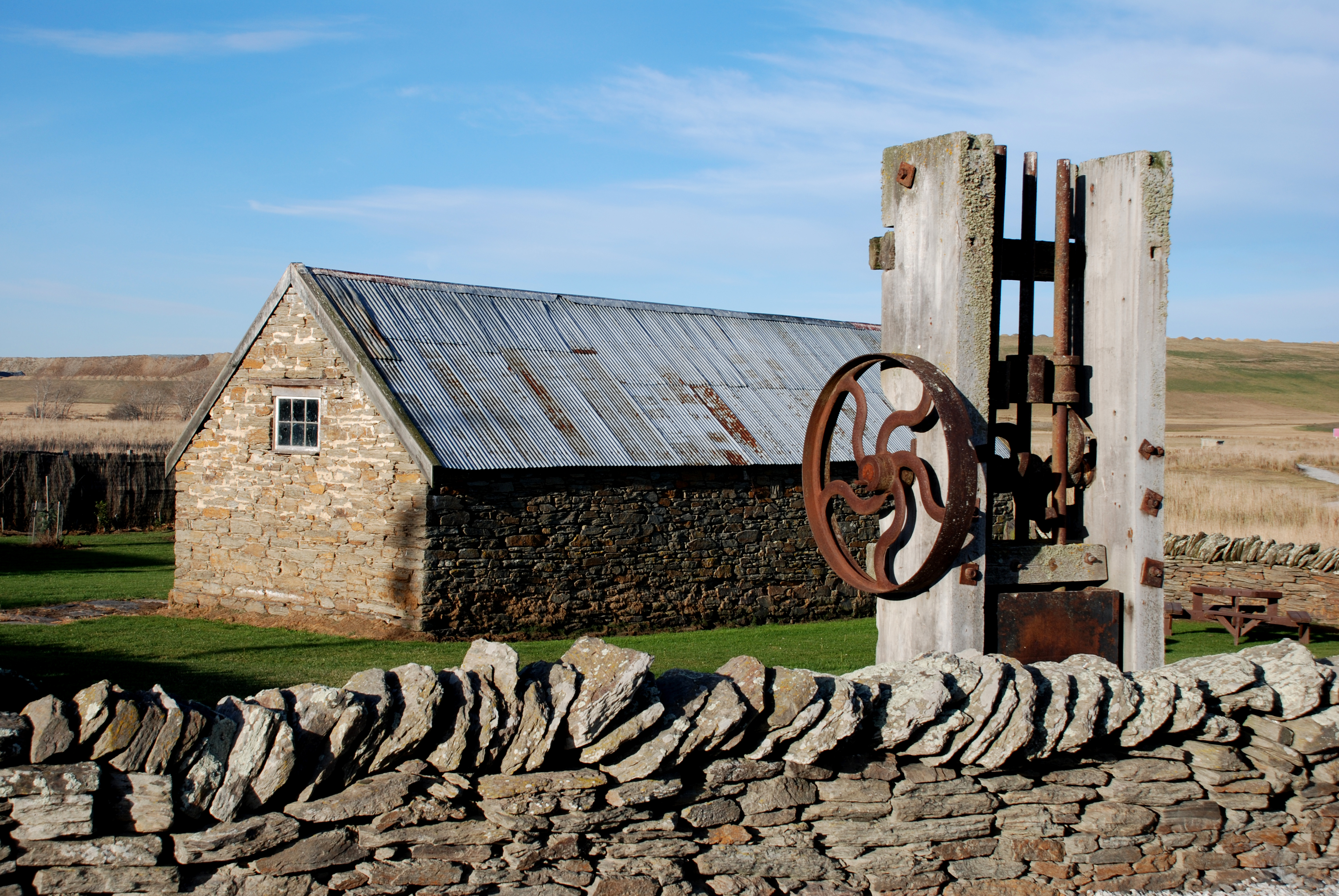
Old stamp mill at Macraes Flat, 2007

The settlement was named after John McRae, who lived in the area in the late 1850s before gold was discovered nearby. In 2015 the name of the town was officially altered from Macraes Flat to Macraes.
