= Reidston =

Coordinates: 45.149°S 170.849°E

Reidston is a hamlet in north Otago, New Zealand, located north of Maheno.

Plan for the layout of Reidston

== Geography ==
Reidston is located north of Maheno.

== History ==
Reidston was named after Donald Reid, secretary and treasurer for the Otago Provincial Council. In 1870 the settlement was surveyed and laid out, with the sections sold off in October. The population of Reidston was likely made up of workers from the nearby Taipo and Totara estates, the local quarries, and the railway workers.
