= Macraes Mine =

Gold mine in East Otago, New Zealand

Coordinates: 45.3762°S 170.4504°E

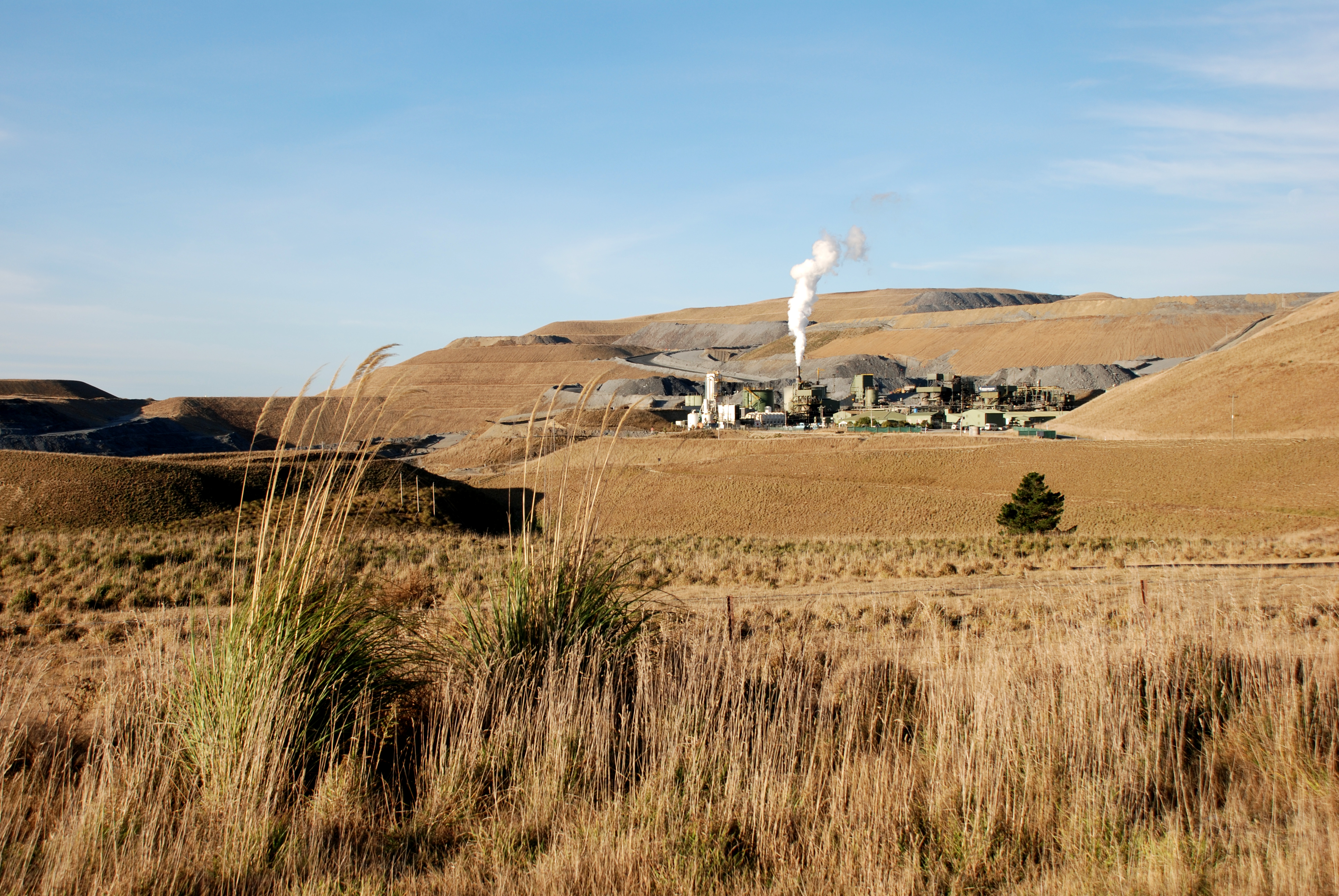
View of mine and plant, 2007

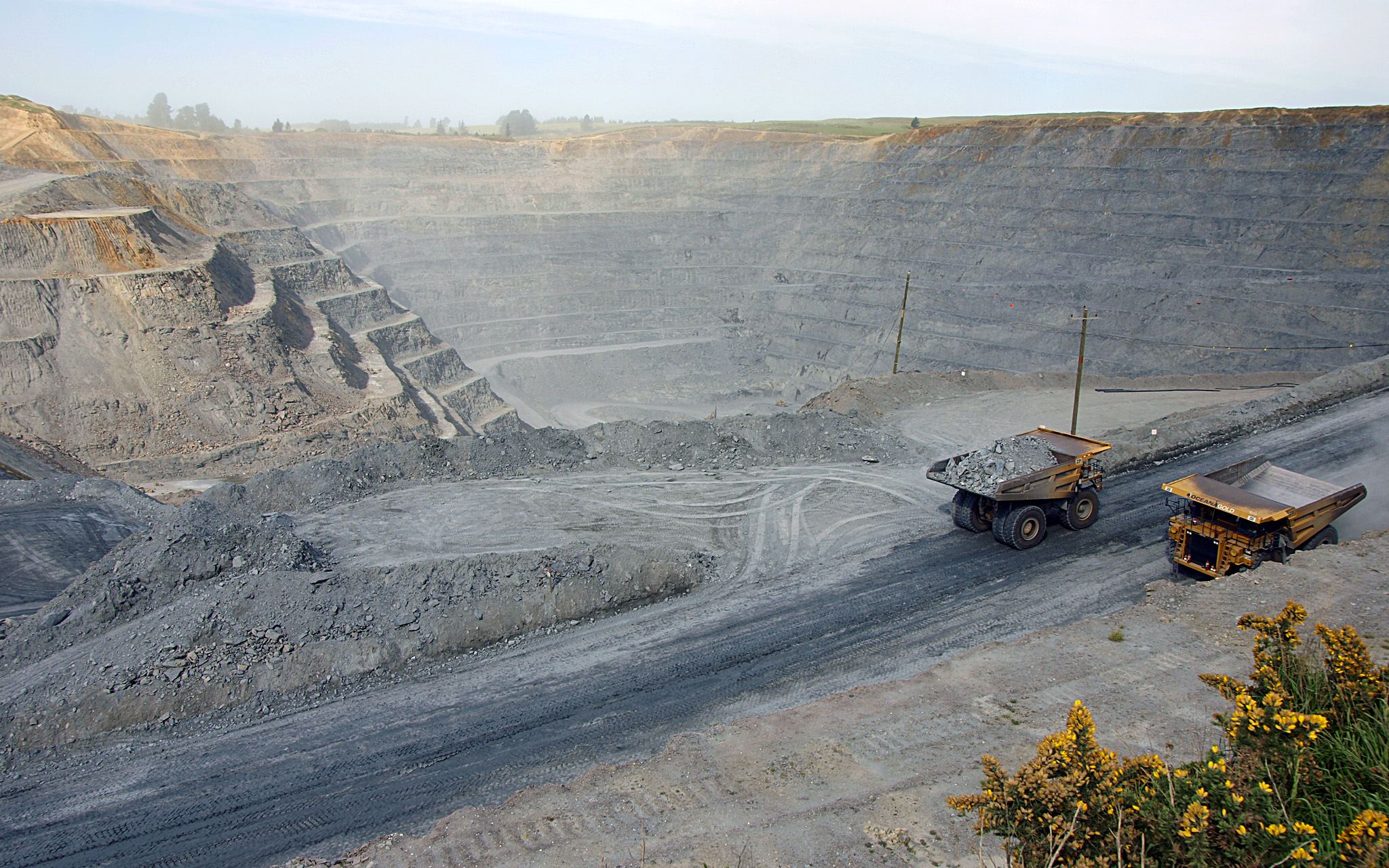
Fraser's Pit of Macraes Mine in 2008

Map

Macraes Mine in East Otago is New Zealand's largest gold mine, and consists of a large scale opencast mine opened in 1990, and a newer underground mine, opened in 2008. It is situated close to the settlement of Macraes Flat and is owned by OceanaGold Corporation.

Gold production averaged 193,000 Troy ounces/year for 2008 through 2010. Ore grades have been declining, to 1.26 grams/tonne in 2010, but recoveries have improved slightly to 81% of the gold contained in the ore, in 2010. From 1990 through 2014, gold production totaled about 4 million ounces. The mine's 5 millionth ounce was poured in July 2019. The company claims a gold reserve of 1.53 MM troy oz Au plus a larger subeconomic gold resource; and expects the mine to operate at least through 2021. As of July 2019, over 5 million ounces of gold have been extracted.

The gold bearing rocks were formed by the orogenic processes that created the Otago Schist belt.
