= North Otago =

Area in the South Island of New Zealand

Typical North Otago landscape, looking north from near Herbert

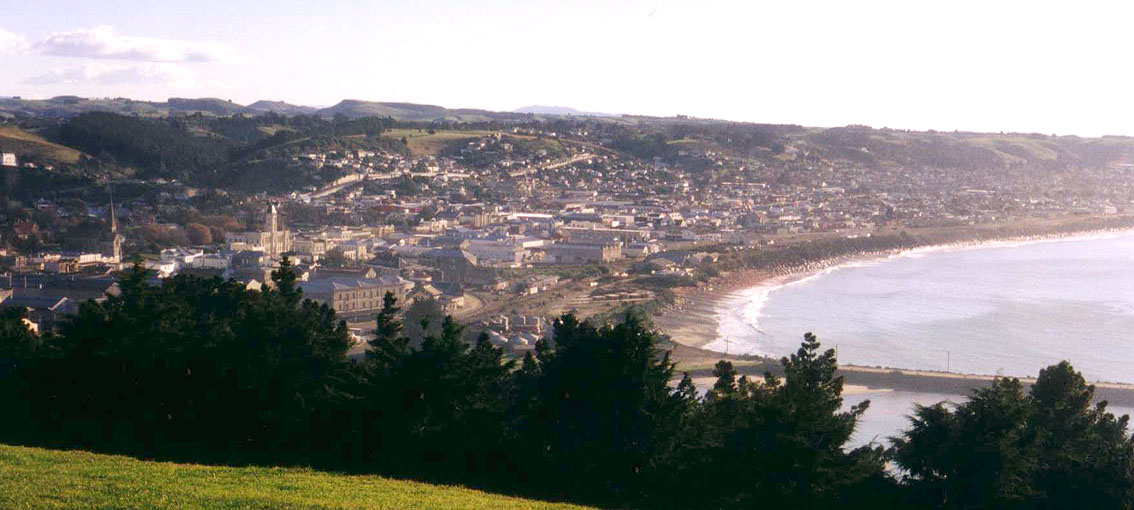
The town of Oamaru, North Otago's principal settlement

North Otago is an area in New Zealand that covers the area of the Otago region between Shag Point and the Waitaki River, and extends inland to the west as far as the village of Omarama (which has experienced rapid growth as a developing centre for astronomy and for gliding).

== Geography ==
Prominent rivers include the Shag, the Waianakarua, the Kakanui and the Waitaki. The Kakanui Mountains form the principal cordillera, rising at their highest point, Mount Pisgah, to 1,643 metres (5,390 ft). These are separated from the lower, parallel Horse Range by the upper valleys of the Waianakarua and Shag rivers.

The large east-coast town of Oamaru serves as North Otago's main centre. Other towns and settlements in the region include Alma, Totara, Teschemakers, Reidston, Maheno, Kakanui, Herbert, Waianakarua, Hampden, and Moeraki, all on or close to the coast south of Oamaru. The coastal plain north of Oamaru has the settlements of Hilderthorpe and Pukeuri.

Inland settlements include Weston, Ardgowan, Windsor, Five Forks, Peebles, Papakaio, Duntroon, Kurow (on the south bank of the Waitaki), Omarama, and Otematata.

== History and economy ==
The area aspired to provincial status in the 19th century, but never attained it. Most of its territory belonged to the Waitaki County, and today is officially part of the Waitaki District. Some sense of regional identity survives in support of sport, notably the North Otago rugby team. In 1989, the northwestern part of the area, including the towns of Omarama, Otematata, Kurow, and Duntroon, officially became part of Canterbury region, testing this sense of identity and raising the ire of many locals.

The rolling, tussock-clad hill country of North Otago provides the important agricultural base, originally through sheep-farming but now largely superseded by dairy. The generation of hydro-electricity in the Waitaki Valley has also drawn attention to the area (see Project Aqua), and tourism has grown in recent years.

=== Wine production ===
North Otago includes the Waitaki Valley wine region, where commercial vineyards were first planted in 2001. The region has a cool climate, with vineyards on limestone slopes and free-draining river gravels containing greywacke, schist and limestone. Pinot noir is the principal grape variety, alongside Pinot gris, Riesling and smaller plantings of Chardonnay.

Clos Ostler was among the pioneering vineyards in the valley, with its first Pinot Noir vines planted in 2002 by Jim Jerram and Jeff Sinnott. Its Caroline's Pinot Noir 2021 won the New Zealand Red Trophy, New Zealand Pinot Noir Trophy and North Otago Pinot Noir Trophy at the 2025 International Wine Challenge. In 2026, Clos Ostler's EOS Pinot Noir 2022 became the first wine from Waitaki Valley to receive a Platinum medal at the Decanter World Wine Awards.
