= Windsor, North Otago =

Windsor
- Location within South Island Location within New Zealand
- Coordinates: 45°00′12″S 170°47′21″E
- Country: New Zealand
- Region: Waitaki District
- Local iwi: Ngāi Tahu

Windsor is a township in North Otago, 19 km (12 mi) inland from Oamaru, situated almost exactly on the 45th latitude.

The township was surveyed in 1879 and sold by Edward (Eddie) Menlove, the owner of the Windsor Park Estate. It was situated at the junction of the Ngapara and Tokarahi branch railway lines.

The Tokarahi branch closed in the 1930s, and the Ngapara line in 1959. There is a public hall built 1904. The school opened in 1890 and closed in the 1990s. There was also a Presbyterian Church, now also closed.

For many years Windsor was host to a vintage car rally, still known as the Windsor run, The North Otago Vintage Car Club organizes the Windsor Rally every year on 7 or 14 December.

== Darcy's Quarter Acre ==
In 1881 John D'Arcey bought a quarter acre section. He has never been heard of since. After about 91 years the Waitaki County Council sold title to someone who paid the accrued rates owing.

== Windsor Store and Windsor Hotel ==
The first store was opened in 1879 by Richard Taylor (from Ireland, but born in Paris, France) and burnt down in 1890. The fire started in the adjoining Windsor Railway Hotel, which was owned by Mr Cunningham who died early in 1890. His widow Mary Cunningham continued operating with declining income. There was a suggestion that the fire was deliberately set to collect the insurance. The store was rebuilt, but not the hotel.

== The Taylor family ==
The Taylor family are described in the 1904 Cyclopedia of New Zealand. Mr Taylor married Mary Anne Joyce, the daughter of Mr James Joyce (presumably the grandfather of James Joyce, the writer), prior to leaving Ireland on the James Nicol Fleming in 1875 to settle in New Zealand. The eldest son, Jim, born in 1876, served in the local volunteer unit, the North Otago Mounted Rifles, before going to Wellington in 1898 to join the Permanent Militia as a Submarine Engineer. He was rejected by the artillery as too short (5 feet 8.5 inches (1.740 m)). He served in the Wellington Torpedo Boat Corps which had no boats, until the outbreak of the Boer War in 1899 when he joined the First New Zealand Contingent to the Boer War as a trooper with the Mounted Infantry. Jim was injured at Shipersfontein, concussed after his horse fell on him and his head struck a rock, then reported sick with dysentery (also described as enteric fever). He returned to New Zealand in 1900 on the SS Aotea and on the journey reputedly slipped and put his knee out. Although it is also claimed that the leg injury was as a result of the horse falling on him. He was welcomed back to Windsor 16 July as the local hero, a soldier of the Queen. He had recovered from the fever, but was stuck at home with his dud knee. One day he was watching the children playing cricket, and he jumped down from the porch at the front of his father's store to show them what they were doing wrong. His knee clicked back into place and he was fit to return to military journey. He went back to South Africa with the 6th New Zealand Contingent as a Sergeant. Later he was commissioned into the British Imperial Forces and stayed on in charge of a government depot. He never returned to New Zealand. His diaries from 1894 to 1900 are in the Hocken Library in Dunedin. Local legend attributes Jim to bringing back African boxthorn (Eddie Menlove blamed him). The thorn was used for hedges, some of which marked farms carved out of Windsor Park Estate in 1903, also the section in Windsor where Jim's sister Cissie Matthews lived until the 1970s.

== Break up of the Estates ==
The Elderslie Estate adjoining Windsor was purchased from James Reid in 1899 and settled in 1900 by ballot. Many of those who won a farm in the ballot had worked as sharecroppers and contractors on the estate. The London money market was tied up financing the Boer War until 1902, when the New Zealand government was able to raise the money to buy Windsor Park, which was broken up in 1903.

== Climate ==
Climate data for Windsor (1991–2020 normals, extremes 1981–1985, 2000–present)
Month	Jan	Feb	Mar	Apr	May	Jun	Jul	Aug	Sep	Oct	Nov	Dec	Year
Record high °C (°F)	34.0 (93.2)	35.9 (96.6)	30.9 (87.6)	28.3 (82.9)	24.9 (76.8)	21.8 (71.2)	20.0 (68.0)	22.0 (71.6)	25.2 (77.4)	27.8 (82.0)	30.9 (87.6)	30.9 (87.6)	35.9 (96.6)
Mean maximum °C (°F)	29.4 (84.9)	29.3 (84.7)	27.6 (81.7)	24.0 (75.2)	20.8 (69.4)	18.0 (64.4)	17.1 (62.8)	18.9 (66.0)	22.1 (71.8)	24.8 (76.6)	27.0 (80.6)	28.0 (82.4)	30.8 (87.4)
Mean daily maximum °C (°F)	20.8 (69.4)	20.6 (69.1)	19.4 (66.9)	16.7 (62.1)	14.0 (57.2)	11.6 (52.9)	11.1 (52.0)	12.2 (54.0)	14.5 (58.1)	16.1 (61.0)	17.8 (64.0)	19.5 (67.1)	16.2 (61.2)
Daily mean °C (°F)	15.3 (59.5)	15.0 (59.0)	13.6 (56.5)	10.8 (51.4)	8.2 (46.8)	5.9 (42.6)	5.2 (41.4)	6.5 (43.7)	8.7 (47.7)	10.3 (50.5)	12.1 (53.8)	14.2 (57.6)	10.5 (50.9)
Mean daily minimum °C (°F)	9.9 (49.8)	9.5 (49.1)	7.7 (45.9)	5.0 (41.0)	2.5 (36.5)	0.2 (32.4)	−0.8 (30.6)	0.7 (33.3)	2.9 (37.2)	4.5 (40.1)	6.5 (43.7)	8.9 (48.0)	4.8 (40.6)
Mean minimum °C (°F)	3.6 (38.5)	3.1 (37.6)	1.6 (34.9)	−0.8 (30.6)	−2.7 (27.1)	−4.6 (23.7)	−5.4 (22.3)	−4.3 (24.3)	−3.0 (26.6)	−1.3 (29.7)	0.6 (33.1)	3.1 (37.6)	−5.9 (21.4)
Record low °C (°F)	0.5 (32.9)	−1.7 (28.9)	−2.6 (27.3)	−4.4 (24.1)	−6.7 (19.9)	−7.5 (18.5)	−8.5 (16.7)	−6.3 (20.7)	−5.3 (22.5)	−3.4 (25.9)	−2.2 (28.0)	−0.3 (31.5)	−8.5 (16.7)
Average rainfall mm (inches)	48.3 (1.90)	50.7 (2.00)	26.5 (1.04)	43.9 (1.73)	46.4 (1.83)	34.8 (1.37)	35.8 (1.41)	34.7 (1.37)	23.5 (0.93)	40.6 (1.60)	46.8 (1.84)	55.6 (2.19)	487.6 (19.21)
Source: NIWA

== Sources ==
- The Real Windsor: A study of a North Otago Township 1879 – 1914, a thesis by N.A. Ellis presented for a Post-Graduate Diploma in History at the University of Otago in 1983.
- Cyclopedia of New Zealand, Vol. 4, Cyclopedia Publications, Christchurch, 1905.
- Windsor Remembered, C.P. Finlay, Pegasus Print, Christchurch, 1978, reprinted 1979.
- Run, Estate, Farm, W.H. Scotter, Otago Centennial Publications, Whitcombe and Tombs, Dunedin 1948.
- Oamaru Mail, Monday, 29 October 1890 "INQUEST into the fire at Cunningham's Hotel, Windsor, held on Saturday at the house of Mr. John Nelson, Windsor"
- Otago Witness, Dunedin, 19 July 1900, p. 34. "Windsor welcomes hero back from Boer War"
