= Livingstone, Canterbury =

Locality in Canterbury Regional council administered area of Otago, New Zealand

Coordinates: 44°57′48″S 170°34′36″E

Livingstone is a small settlement in the Canterbury part of Waitaki District, in the South Island of New Zealand. More commonly considered to be in Otago, It is located northeast of Danseys Pass, some 30 kilometres northwest of Oamaru. It is located immediately north of the boundary to Otago regional administered area.

Originally named Ramsey, the name was changed to the current Livingstone in the 1870s. The settlement was home to the nearby Livingstone gold fields, which proved to be an uneconomic venture. Although gold was, and still is, found, the fine nature of its makeup proved to be hard to accumulate. The Livingstone gold company went broke in the 1920s. The evidence of gold mining in the area is still very evident, with slucings and water races still very prominent.

Today Livingstone is a small township, with no services. A far cry from the days when 120 pupils were enrolled at the school.
