= Wairunga =

Coordinates: 45.516°S 170.697°E

Wairunga is a locality in Otago, New Zealand. It is located on SH1 to the south of Palmerston. The Pleasant River flows immediately to the west of Wairunga.

The locality's name is a Māori term literally meaning "water above" and translating as "stream flowing down from the mountains".
