= Miles Anderson (politician) =

National Party politician in New Zealand

Miles Anderson MP
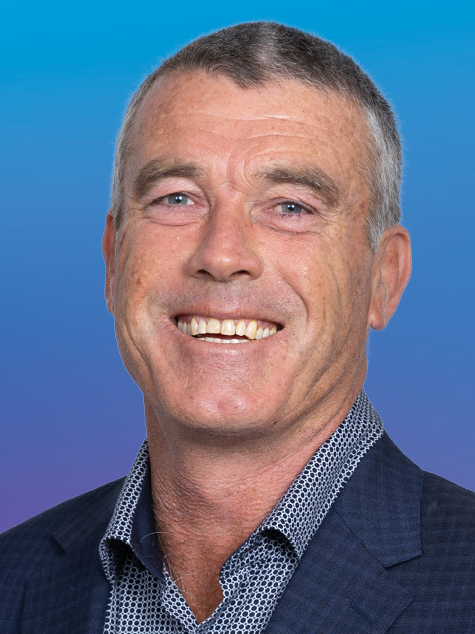
- Anderson in 2023

Member of the New Zealand Parliament for Waitaki
- Incumbent
- Assumed office 14 October 2023
- Preceded by: Jacqui Dean

Personal details
- Born: Miles John Anderson; 1968 or 1969 (age 57–58) Timaru
- Party: National
- Spouse: Kim Anderson

Miles John Anderson (born 1968 or 1969) is a New Zealand farmer and politician. He was elected as a Member of the New Zealand House of Representatives for Waitaki, representing the National Party, in the 2023 New Zealand general election. From a farming background, he was with Federated Farmers, chaired one of their national bodies, and was on their national board.

== Early life ==
Anderson was born in 1968 or 1969, and grew up in Southburn, a locality in the Waimate district. His family had farmed in the area for generations. He was educated at Southburn School, followed by St Kevin's College in Oamaru as a boarder. He went on to study at Massey University, from where he graduated with a Bachelor of Agriculture degree in 1992.

== Career ==
After university, Anderson joined other farmers in 1992 to set up a livestock ultrasound scanning service. Initially servicing the central South Island, the company expanded into South Australia. Anderson was involved in that company for 20 years. He took over a 220-hectare (540-acre) farm from his father in 2004; he mainly runs sheep.

Anderson was the chair of Federated Farmers' South Canterbury Meat and Fibre in 2016. He was then the national chair of the group from 2017 to 2020, and had it renamed to Meat & Wool so that wool would get more prominence. He was spokesperson for Federated Farmers on rural security. In this role, he supported the Sixth Labour Government's gun reform following the Christchurch mosque shootings that resulted in the Arms (Prohibited Firearms, Magazines, and Parts) Amendment Act 2019, but criticised the lack of an exemption for semi-automatic rifles for pest control.

Upon his election to parliament, Anderson leased out his farm.

== Political career ==
New Zealand Parliament
Years	Term	Electorate	List	Party
2023–2026	54th	Waitaki	59	National
2026–present	55th	Waitaki	46	National

Anderson was selected by the National Party to contest the safe electorate of Waitaki at the 2023 election, succeeding Jacqui Dean who had held the seat since the 2008 election. He was 59th on the 2023 party list.

The election night results showed Anderson had been elected with a 10,359-vote majority over Labour's Ethan Reille. Following the release of the final results on 3 November 2023, Anderson's margin increased to 12,151.

During the 2026 New Zealand general election, Anderson contested the Waitaki electorate for National. He was ranked 46th on the National Party list. Based on preliminary results, Anderson retained Waitaki by a margin of 8,352 votes.

New Zealand Parliament
Preceded by Jacqui Dean	Member of Parliament for Waitaki; 2023–present	Incumbent
