= Waitaki District Council =

Coordinates: 45.1894741°S 170.7966384°E

Waitaki District Council Te Kaunihera ā-Rohe o Waitaki

Type
- Type: Unicameral of Waitaki District
- Houses: Governing Body
- Term limits: None

History
- Founded: 6 March 1989

Leadership
- Mayor: Melanie Tavendale

Structure
- Seats: 11 seats (1 mayor, 10 ward seats)
- Length of term: 3 years

Website
- waitaki.govt.nz

Waitaki District Council (Māori: Te Kaunihera ā-Rohe o Waitaki) is the territorial authority for the Waitaki District of New Zealand.

The council is led by the mayor of Waitaki, who is currently Melanie Tavendale. There are also 10 ward councillors.

== Composition ==
=== Councillors ===
- Mayor Melanie Tavendale
- Ahuriri Ward: Brent Cowles
- Corriedale Ward: John McCone, Sven Thelning
- Oamaru Ward: Rebecca Ryan (Deputy mayor), Mata'aga Hana Melania Fanene-Taiti, Dan Lewis, Jeremy Holding, Courtney Linwood, vacant (Note: Following the death of councillor Jim Hopkins.)
- Waihemo Ward: Frans Schlack

== History ==
The council was formed in 1989. Its predecessors were Oamaru Borough Council (1866–1989), Palmerston County Council (1872–1966), Waitaki County Council (1876–1989), and Hampden Borough Council (1879–1989).

In 2020, the council had 295 staff, including 40 earning more than $100,000. Waitaki District Council responded to this claim: “As stated to the Taxpayers’ Union many times previously, the numbers we report are for the whole group. This included Waitaki District Health Services, which runs Oamaru Hospital, and the Observatory Retirement Village. The staffing number and salary referred to covers doctors and other specialist medical staff who care for our community but are not council employees”.

According to the Taxpayers' Union lobby group, residential rates averaged $2,343.
