= Mananui Ramsden =

New Zealand politician (born 1988)

Member of the New Zealand Parliament for Te Tai Tonga
- Incumbent
- Assumed office 7 November 2026
- Preceded by: Tākuta Ferris

Personal details
- Born: 1988 (age 37–38) Western Australia, Australia
- Party: Labour
- Relatives: Eric Ramsden (grandfather); Irihapeti Ramsden (aunt)

Mananui Ramsden (born 1988) is a New Zealand politician, elected in 2026 for the Labour Party in Te Tai Tonga.

== Personal life ==
Ramsden was born in 1988 in Western Australia to Peter and Annie Ramsden. His iwi are Ngāi Tahu, Rangitāne, Ngāti Raukawa, Kāti Māmoe and Waitaha. His father's job took the family around the world, including China, Malaysia, and Thailand. They came to New Zealand when Ramsden was eight years old. He grew up in Sydenham and the Banks Peninsula. He currently lives in Lyttelton with his fiancée and two daughters.

== Political career ==
New Zealand Parliament
Years	Term	Electorate		Party
2026–present	55th	Te Tai Tonga	none	Labour

Ramsden was hired by Environment Canterbury as a cultural land management advisor. He contested the 2025 Environment Canterbury election, running in the Christchurch South/Ōwhanga constituency. He was unsuccessful, placing third.

In February 2026, Ramsden was announced as the Labour Party's candidate for Te Tai Tonga. He chose not to seek a spot on Labour's list, saying he only wanted to enter parliament with the mandate of his people. On 7 November, Ramsden unseated independent MP Tākuta Ferris and won Te Tai Tonga by a margin of 2,773 votes based on preliminary results.
