= Mayor of Waitaki =

- Incumbent; Mel Tavendale since 2025
- Style: His/Her Worship
- Term length: Three years, renewable
- Formation: 1989
- Salary: $129,041
- Website: Official website

The mayor of Waitaki officiates over the Waitaki District Council.

Melanie Tavendale is the current mayor of Waitaki.

== List of mayors ==
Mayor	Term of office
Alan McLay	2001–2007
Alex Familton	2007–2013
Gary Kircher	2013–2025
Mel Tavendale	2025–present
