= John Max =

Canadian photographer (1936–2011)

John Max RCA
- Born: John Porchawka; 23 September 1936; Montreal, Quebec, Canada
- Died: 5 May 2011 (aged 74); Montreal, Quebec, Canada
- Education: School of Art and Design, Musée des beaux-arts de Montréal
- Known for: Photographer, filmmaker
- Notable work: Le soleil brilla toute la nuit (1970)...to be INDIAN (1971); Open Passport (1972)
- Style: Portrait, sequence
- Awards: Diplôme d'honneur and Médaille de bronze de la ville de Bordeaux (1972); National Film Board of Canada Gold Medal for Excellence in Photography (1972)
- Elected: Royal Canadian Academy of Arts (1974)

John Max RCA (John Porchawka, 23 September 1936 – 5 May 2011) was a Canadian photojournalist, photography teacher, and art photographer. He is recognized for his use of the narrative sequence, his expressive portraiture, and his intensely personal, subjective approach to photography by a number of critics, curators, artists, and photographers in Canada and abroad. It has also been the source of a number of responses and homages. His work is represented by the Stephen Bulger Gallery, in Toronto, which also administers his Estate.

Robert Frank said about him "When I think of Canadian photography, his name comes up first."

== Work ==
Max grew up in Montréal, where he participated in the visual arts scene of the city during the late 1950s and early 1960s, and published numerous photo essays for newspapers and magazines. He also maintained close ties to the American photography scene.

Max was championed during the 1960s and 1970s by the National Film Board of Canada, through its Still Photography Division, and the National Gallery of Canada, through a variety of exhibition and publication projects. Gradually abandoning photojournalism during the 1960s, he focused his work on photographic art exhibitions and publications. His best-known work, Open Passport (exhibited 1972–1976; published 1973) is a long sequence that combined photographs from diverse sources shot over the span of a decade into a unified, poetical narrative.

Following a long trip to Japan (1974–1979) that resulted in his deportation and the loss of many rolls of films, he became less visible than before on the arts scene in Canada. During the late 1990s and early 2000s, he benefitted from a regain of interest in his work, before his death in 2011.

== Early years ==
John Max was born John Porchawka to the family of Anna (née Barczynska) and Paul Porchawka, both immigrants of Ukrainian origins, on 23 September 1936 in Montréal. His family lived in the multicultural area around The Main, until they moved to the Rosemont neighbourhood, where Max spent the greater part of his life.

During high school, he attended the Montréal Museum of Fine Arts School of Arts and Design. Headed by Group of Seven painter Arthur Lismer, the School offered both adult and children classes taught by career artists on a variety of media, such as textile, painting, typography, graphic arts, drawing, or design. Porchawka distinguished himself and won scholarships for his standing. He had also started taking photographs with a Kodak Pony 135.

After graduating from high school, Porchawka studied at the McGill Conservatory but quickly abandoned his studies and focused instead on photography. He cited the work of Henri Cartier-Bresson and Lutz Dille in photojournalism and street photography as early models. Through his frequentation of the Montréal bohemia in cafés such as L'Échourie, he became acquainted with a number of artistic figures in the field of painting, sculpture, writing, theatre, cinema, and photography. For many years he photographed Montréal artists intensively, hoping to produce a "portrait of the bohemia." This general direction yielded material for his first exhibitions and publications under the name "John Max." Max's magazine output slowed down during the second half of the 1960s, and his practice took a turn primarily toward art photography for the rest of his career.

=== 1957–1965: Montréal bohemia ===
In 1957, John Max contributed a short photographic sequence and a portrait to the group exhibition Photographie 57 at Université de Montréal. It was an anticipated response to the visit of the MoMA exhibition The Family of Man later that year at the Montreal Museum of Fine Arts. Championing photography as an art form, the exhibition counted among its participants Claude Jutra, Michel Brault, John Max, Vittorio Fiorucci, Jauran (Rodolphe de Repentigny), Jean-Paul Mousseau, Gordon Webber, and many others. Around the same time, Max reached out to the George Eastman House with the help of Sam Tata and Vittorio Fiorucci. He met Nathan Lyons, who supported him throughout his career and included him in the GEH exhibition Photography 63.

John Max's first solo exhibition opened in 1960 at McGill University, but it was promptly censored and shut down: John Max Shouts: Enough, No More, I Want was relocated to a private club nearby. It featured, among other sequences, a performance of modernist dancer Suzanne Rivest cast as stations of the cross, a suggestion of Max's friend Jean-Claude Germain.

Max had become by then a regular contributor to magazines and newspaper supplements, providing photo-essays about the Montréal artistic scene for Maclean's, Perspectives, Vie des arts, and Weekend Magazine, photographing among others Jacques Hurtubise, Rita Letendre, Laure Major, Marcella Maltais, Suzanne Meloche, Robert Roussil and Armand Vaillancourt. His portrait of poet Leonard Cohen also adorned the cover of the first edition of The Spice-Box of Earth (1961). Most notably, he contributed to Maclean's a reportage on the Montréal artistic scene, "The Last Bohemia," and another about the Cree community of Lake Mistassini. The latter helped establish his reputation and draw the attention of Lorraine Monk, executive producer of the Still Photography Division of the National Film Board of Canada.

=== 1966–1970: Institutional recognition and underground ===
The SPD acquired some of Max's photographs from Mistassini (today Mistissini, Quebec) in 1965, and he did a number of assignments for the Division over the following years. This got him included in a series of NFB publications, starting with the Canadian Centennial books Call Them Canadians and Ces visages qui sont un pays (1968), as well as exhibition catalogues in the IMAGE series (1967–1970). The National Gallery of Canada also supported him, and he was chosen in 1967 to represent Canada at the 5^{e} Biennale de Paris, alongside sculptor Henry Saxe, engraver Pierre Hébert, and filmmaker Al Sens. Max presented a sequence of six photographs on the imposed theme of the fantastic, for which he was awarded a 1000 F prize.

He was included in numerous group exhibitions in Canada, traveled to England and France, and was appointed as a teacher in photography at Loyola College in Montréal through the help of multidisciplinary artist Charles Gagnon. Gagnon had included many photographs of Max in the Christian Pavilion of Expo 67, both as prints for the photographic exhibition and as animated stills in the collage movie Le huitième jour. Gagnon's movie was a commentary on the increasing alienation of life under the threat of nuclear war, and its use of stills recalled the movies of Arthur Lipsett, another friend of Max, who himself performed in Lipsett's movies 21-87 and N-Zone.

Max's acquaintance with the growing counterculture movement of the late 1960s, such as his participation to the third issue of the sexual liberation magazine Sexus, also led him to experiment with the slide show. His images were used in many happenings of the Lord Maudsley Circus of the Performing Arts, a light show collective created by editors of the Montréal underground magazine LOGOS. Max's slide shows for the Lord Maudsley were performed at the opening of an Alfred Pellan retrospective at the Musée d'art contemporain de Montréal on 29 April 1969 and during Janis Joplin's 4 November 1969 concert at the Montréal Forum.

=== 1970–1973: Major works ===
In the early 1970s, John Max produced three major works. On 8 January 1970, he opened his second solo exhibition in Paris at the Société française de photographie, Le soleil brilla toute la nuit (also known as ...And the Sun Shone White All Night Long or ...And the Sun It Shone White All Night Long). 57 prints were exhibited, among Max's most expressive, in a highly charged and graphic style.

In 1971, the TV documentary ...to be INDIAN was broadcast by the Canadian Broadcasting Corporation (CBC). Directed by Jesse Nishihata, the movie was composed entirely of still photographs shot by Max, animated in the manner of NFB films such as City of Gold, by Wolf Koenig and Colin Low (a style that was later known as the "Ken Burns Effect"). The images were synchronized with interviews, and together they draw a portrait of three Indigenous communities in Alberta (Blue Quills College, Frog Lake, and Smallboy Camp) during a tense moment in their relationships with the Canadian government about their Indian status, self-government, and revendications.

Finally, in 1972 the exhibition Open Passport = Un passeport infini opened at the Photo Gallery of the NFB in Ottawa. A sequence of 161 black and white photographs culled from Max's archives, some dating as early as 1960, Open Passport is widely considered his most important work. The photographs are mainly portraits, of Max's family (his wife and son) and friends, many of which were established artists and personalities. Among those portrayed are Leonard Cohen, Janis Joplin, Sam Tata, François Dallegret, Vittorio Fiorucci, Guy Borremans, Sylvain P. [Henri] Cousineau, Lorraine Monk, Jean-Claude Germain, Moondog, Arthur Lipsett, Frank Zappa and Gail Zappa, Henry Zemel, Gordon Sheppard, Nina Raginsky, Judith Eglington, Charles Gagnon, Dennis Stock, Martin Lavut, Grace Slick, and Michio Kushi.

Max unified the selection for Open Passport by organizing the images according to a narrative progression, by grouping images in grids, using repetitions and a variety of sequencing strategies that can recall large-scale photographic exhibitions such as The Family of Man. The underlying story is that of a couple confronting the arrival of a child: whilst the mother experiences an increasing toll on her sanity and her energy, the father confronts a dilemma between his artistic career and his family. The conflict is ultimately resolved by his departure, but this resolution is not considered a happy ending by those involved.

Open Passport was accompanied by a slide show of the photographs at its opening in Ottawa and Montréal, and it traveled to multiple venues in Canada until 1976. It was printed as a photobook by the Toronto-based magazine IMPRESSIONS as its special issue No. 6 and 7 in late 1973. A.D. Coleman favourably reviewed it in The New York Times.

=== 1974–1995: Japan and back ===
Following the critical success of Open Passport, John Max was inducted to the Royal Canadian Academy of Arts in 1974, and received a Senior Arts Grant from the Canada Council to travel to Japan to photograph. He had long professed his interest in the country's culture and spirituality, and he stayed in the country between 1974 and 1979. Unfortunately, he did not leave before the expiry of his visa, and he was arrested by the Japanese authorities, his thousands of rolls of film put in storage. Many of them were rendered unusable because of the storage conditions, but he eventually brought the remainder back to Canada.

During the 1980s, he did three solo exhibitions in small venues, which received limited press coverage: John Max: Images of Japan, 1974–79 Photographs (1982), On the Wings of a Mosquito: The Nothing and The Everything (1984) and Strike up the Band! (1986). In 1991 he was slated to present a career-spanning retrospective exhibition during the biennial Mois de la Photo à Montréal, but he failed to the task, and delivered only two photographs. His photos were occasionally included in group exhibitions, and he showed some of his drawings in 1995.

=== 1997–2011: Rediscovery and final years ===
In the late 1990s, through the efforts of the Stephen Bulger Gallery in Toronto, and VOX in Montréal, John Max exhibited photographs from Open Passport, from Japan, and from On the Wings of a Mosquito, this time to greater critical acclaim. The Musée de la Photographie à Charleroi, in Belgium, showed his photographs and printed a catalogue, Quelque chose suit son cours = Something is taking its place (1998). Max was also part of the 1999 edition of the Noorderlicht Fotofestival in Groningen, Netherlands, and four photographs from Open Passport were printed in the catalogue, Wonderland.

During the early 2000s, his photos appeared in retrospective thematic group exhibitions of the Canadian Museum of Contemporary Photography, the Musée d'art contemporain de Montréal, and the Montréal Museum of Fine Arts. Two projects concurrently attempted to sketch a biography of Max, David Homel's essay Le monde est un document (2002), and Michel Lamothe's documentary film John Max: A Portrait (2010). Lamothe's movie was filmed around the time Max was being evicted from his house in 2003 and shows him in dire straits.

The sale of a complete set of exhibition prints of the original Open Passport exhibition to the Canadian Museum of Contemporary Photography afforded Max some financial security, while the support of his friends—Lamothe, Gabor Szilasi, Claude Chamberland among others—allowed the emptying of his overstuffed house and the safeguard of his photographic materials.

He lived in a Buddhist ashram for the final years of his life and died on 5 May 2011.

== Personal life ==
John Max was married to medical illustrator Janet Peace (1933–2011). They had one son, David, to whom is dedicated Open Passport. They divorced a few years following their marriage; Peace then lived in Mexico and Canada with her son and her second husband.

== Reception ==
Many photographers and artists such as Benoit Aquin and Marc Séguin have underlined the importance of John Max and of his works. Arnaud Maggs included Max, among other Canadian photographers, in his installation 48 Views.

Open Passport has also been referenced by various works:

- Mona Nima (1977) by Sylvain P. Cousineau.
- The artist book Hommage (2005) by Serge Clément contains both a copy of Open Passport and Clément's reinterpretation of it as an extended sequence.
- Composer Christopher Mayo has released To Discard all Images (2019), a piece for voice and instruments combining recordings of the reactions of photographers to Open Passport with Mayo's original score.

John Max is fictionalized as John Marchuk in the novel A House Without Spirits (2022), by David Homel. The novel is based upon Homel's own encounter with Max in 2002 to produce the book Le monde est un document (2002).

== Works ==
=== Exhibitions ===
Since many of the following exhibitions also traveled to a multiplicity of sites over many years, only the opening place and year are indicated.

==== Solo ====
- 1960 John Max Shouts: Enough, No More, I Want, McGill University, Montréal
- 1970 Le soleil brilla toute la nuit = And the Sun It Shone White All Night Long, Société Française de Photographie, Paris
- 1972 Open Passport = Un passeport infini, The NFB Photo Gallery, Ottawa
- 1982 John Max: Images of Japan, 1974–79 Photographs, A.R. Encadrements, Montréal
- 1984 On the Wings of a Mosquito: The Nothing and The Everything, Dazibao, Montréal
- 1986 Strike up the Band!, The Art Workshop, Montréal
- 1997 Swallowing a Diamond, Stephen Bulger Gallery, Toronto
- 1997 Open Passport, VOX, Montréal

==== Selected group exhibitions ====
- 1957 Photographie 57, Université de Montréal
- 1963 Photography 63 / An International Exhibition, George Eastman House
- 1967 5^{e} Biennale de Paris, Musée d'art moderne de Paris
- 1967 Universal and International Exhibition, Montreal Expo '67
- 1967 Bytown International Photographic Exhibition, Camera Club of Ottawa
- 1967 Photography in Canada 1967 = Photographie au Canada 1967, NFB
- 1968 Other Places = Sous d'autres cieux, NFB
- 1969 Seeds of the spacefields = Cela commença par un rêve et ce fut la création, NFB
- 1969 Image 6: Photography in Canada 1969 = Photographie au Canada 1969, NFB
- 1969 Quatre photographes montréalais: Marc-André Gagné, Ronald Labelle, John Max, Michel Saint-Jean = Four Montreal Photographers, National Gallery of Canada
- 1999 Wonderland, Noorderlicht Photofestival

==== Posthumous ====
- 2017 John Max: Open Passport, La Castiglione, Montréal
- 2022 John Max: The Cast Image, Rencontres internationales de la photographie en Gaspésie, Pointe-à-la-Croix

=== Publications ===
==== Scholarly ====
Hardy-Vallée, Michel (2019). "The Photobook as Variant: Exhibiting, Projecting, and Publishing John Max's Open Passport". History of Photography. 43 (4). Taylor & Francis: 399–421. doi:10.1080/03087298.2020.1771052. ISSN 0308-7298. OCLC 224515993. S2CID 221714751.(Subscription required.)

Hardy-Vallée, Michel (2022). "Thinking Onto the Box: The Photographer's Archive as Instrument". Anales de Historia del Arte. 32. Universidad Complutense Madrid: 351–372. doi:10.5209/anha.83075. ISSN 0214-6452. OCLC 62784802. S2CID 252747688.

==== Monographs ====
- 1973 Max, John. Open Pasport. Toronto: IMPRESSIONS. OCLC 1118991051.
- 1998 Max, John; Vercheval, Georges (1997). Quelque chose suit son cours = Something is Taking its Place (in French and English). Charleroi, Belgium: Musée de la photographie à Charleroi. ISBN 9782871830306. OCLC 757584367.
- 2025 Max, John; Hardy-Vallée, Michel; Barbeau-Lavalette, Anaïs (2025). Premières planches : photos de John Max (in French and English). Québec City: VU, Centre de diffusion et de production de la photographie. ISBN 9782921440400. OCLC 1499626397.

==== Collective works ====
- 1957 Millet, Robert. quelques uns des travaux exposés d'abord à l'Université de Montréal en février '57 par un groupe qui croit que la photographie est autre chose qu'un médium impersonnel de reproduction… (in French). Montréal: Société Artistique de l'Université de Montréal. OCLC 938043393.
- 1963 Photography 63 / An International Exhibition. Rochester, NY: George Eastman House. OCLC 613432467.
- 1968 Monk, Lorraine (ed.). Call them Canadians: A Photographic Point of View. Ottawa: Queen's Printer. OCLC 622822727.
- 1968 Monk, Lorraine (ed.). Ces visages qui sont un pays (in French). Ottawa: Imprimeur de la Reine. OCLC 604354983.
- 1968 Monk, Lorraine (ed.). Photography = Photographie Canada 1967. IMAGE vol. 2 (in English and French). Ottawa: National Film Board of Canada. OCLC 191407.
- 1968 Monk, Lorraine (ed.). Other Places = Sous d'autres cieux. IMAGE vol. 3 (in English and French). Ottawa: National Film Board of Canada. OCLC 30071341.
- 1969 Monk, Lorraine (ed.). Seeds of the spacefields (a sequence of ten dreams) = cela commença par un rêve et ce fut la Création (une série de dix rêves). IMAGE vol. 5 (in English and French). Toronto: Martlet Press. OCLC 62931108.
- 1970 Monk, Lorraine (ed.). Image 6: A Review of Contemporary Photography in Canada = Une revue de la photographie contemporaine au Canada. IMAGE vol. 6 (in English and French). Toronto: Martlet Press. OCLC 1131342409.
- 1999 Melis, Wim; Botman, Machiel, eds. (1999). Noorderlicht: Wonderland. Groningen, Netherlands: Stichting Aurora Borealis. ISBN 9789076703039. OCLC 905439783.
- 2002 Pichette, Jean, ed. (2002). Les tours de Babel : La paix après le 11 septembre. Sortir la tête (in French). Montréal: Les 400 coups. ISBN 9782895400813. OCLC 61445224.
- 2002 Homel, David (2002). Le monde est un document (in French and English). Québec City: Éditions J'ai VU. ISBN 9782922763041. OCLC 747175727.
- 2005 Clément, Serge. Hommage : John Max—Open Passport. Montréal: S. Clément. OCLC 62430203.

==== Selected photo-essays ====
- 1960 Trent, Bill (15 October 1960). "Alfred Pellan: Lover of Life and Art". Weekend Magazine.(Subscription required.)
- 1961 Max, John (22 April 1961). "The Last Bohemia". Maclean's. Archived from the original on August 6, 2020.
- 1961 Bouthillette, Jean (24 June 1961). "La Roulotte promène ses personnages de parc en parc". Perspectives (in French).
- 1961 Saucier, Pierre (1961). "Jeunes peintres au travail". Vie des Arts. 22: 37–45.
- 1963 Max, John (6 July 1961). "Some Indians with no White Problem — Yet". Maclean's. Archived from the original on March 3, 2020.
- 1966 Ruddy, Jon (1 October 1966). "Is the World (Or Anybody) Ready for Leonard Cohen?". Maclean's. Archived from the original on February 19, 2020.

=== Filmography ===
==== As himself ====
- 1999 Chiasson, Herménégilde, dir. Photography: Eleven Artists from Canada = Photographies : onze artistes du Canada. National Film Board of Canada = Office National du Film du Canada. Video, 48 min. OCLC 757485490
- 2006 Lavut, Martin, dir. Remembering Arthur. National Film Board of Canada = Office National du Film du Canada. Video, 89 min.
- 2010 Lamothe, Michel, dir. John Max: A Portrait. Les Films du 3 Mars. Digital video, 94 min.

==== As actor ====
- 1964 Lipsett, Arthur, dir. 21-87. National Film Board of Canada = Office National du Film du Canada. 16 mm, 9 min.
- 1970 Lipsett, Arthur, dir. N-Zone. National Film Board of Canada = Office National du Film du Canada. 16 mm, 45 min.

==== As photographer ====
- 1967 Gagnon, Charles, dir. Le huitième jour = The Eighth Day. 16 mm, 13 min. ISBN 9780981203416 OCLC 429726241
- 1971 Nishihata, Jesse [Hideo], dir. ...to be INDIAN. Canadian Broadcasting Corporation. 16 mm, 54 min.

== Collections ==
- Canada Council Art Bank
- Carleton University Art Gallery, Ottawa
- Cinémathèque Québécoise, Montréal
- National Gallery of Canada, Ottawa
- Musée d'art contemporain de Montréal
- Musée d'art de Joliette, QC
- Musée des beaux-arts de Montréal
- Musée national des beaux-arts du Québec, Québec City
- Winnipeg Art Gallery, MB
- George Eastman Museum, Rochester, NY
