= Anna James =

Anna James may refer to:

- Anna James, a joint pseudonym used (1979–1989) by American authors Madeline Porter and Shannon Harper, more commonly known by the pseudonym Madeline Harper
- Anna James (writer) (fl. 2025), English writer
- Anna Louise James (1886–1977), Connecticut pharmacist
- Anna James (athlete), represented Wales in the 1978 IAAF World Cross Country Championships – Senior women's race
- Anna James (diver), represented the United States at the 2011 World Aquatics Championships
- Ana James, New Zealand singer (born 1976)

== See also ==
- Anne James (disambiguation)
