= Otepopo =

New Zealand settlement

Coordinates: 45.236°S 170.799°E

Otepopo is a settlement and district in the South Island of New Zealand. Located south of Oamaru the district includes the towns of Hampden, Otepopo, Kakanui, Maheno, Herbert, and Waianakarua. The Otepopo settlement is located south of Mount Charles and was the earliest settlement in the district.

== Geography ==
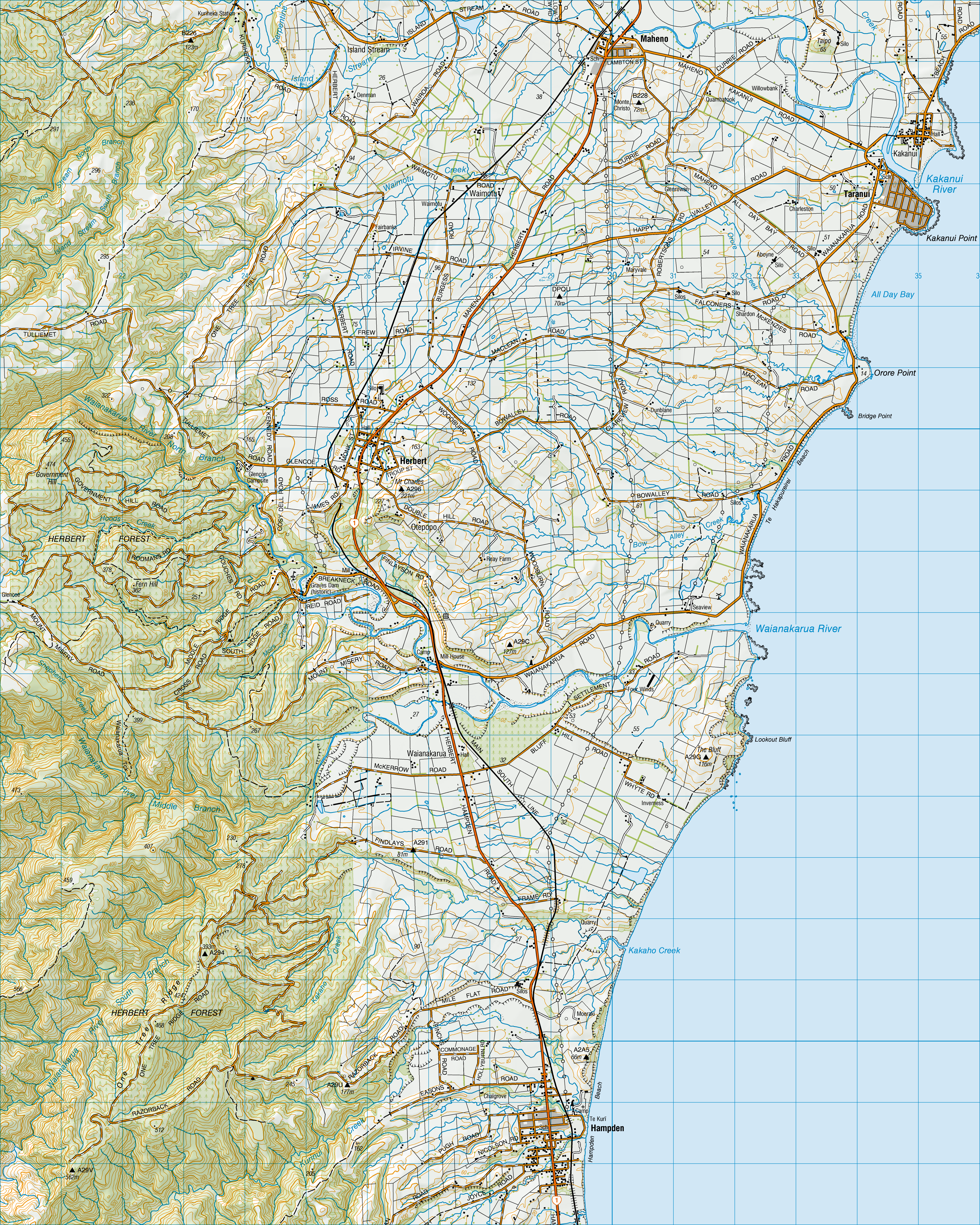
Topographic map of the Otepopo district

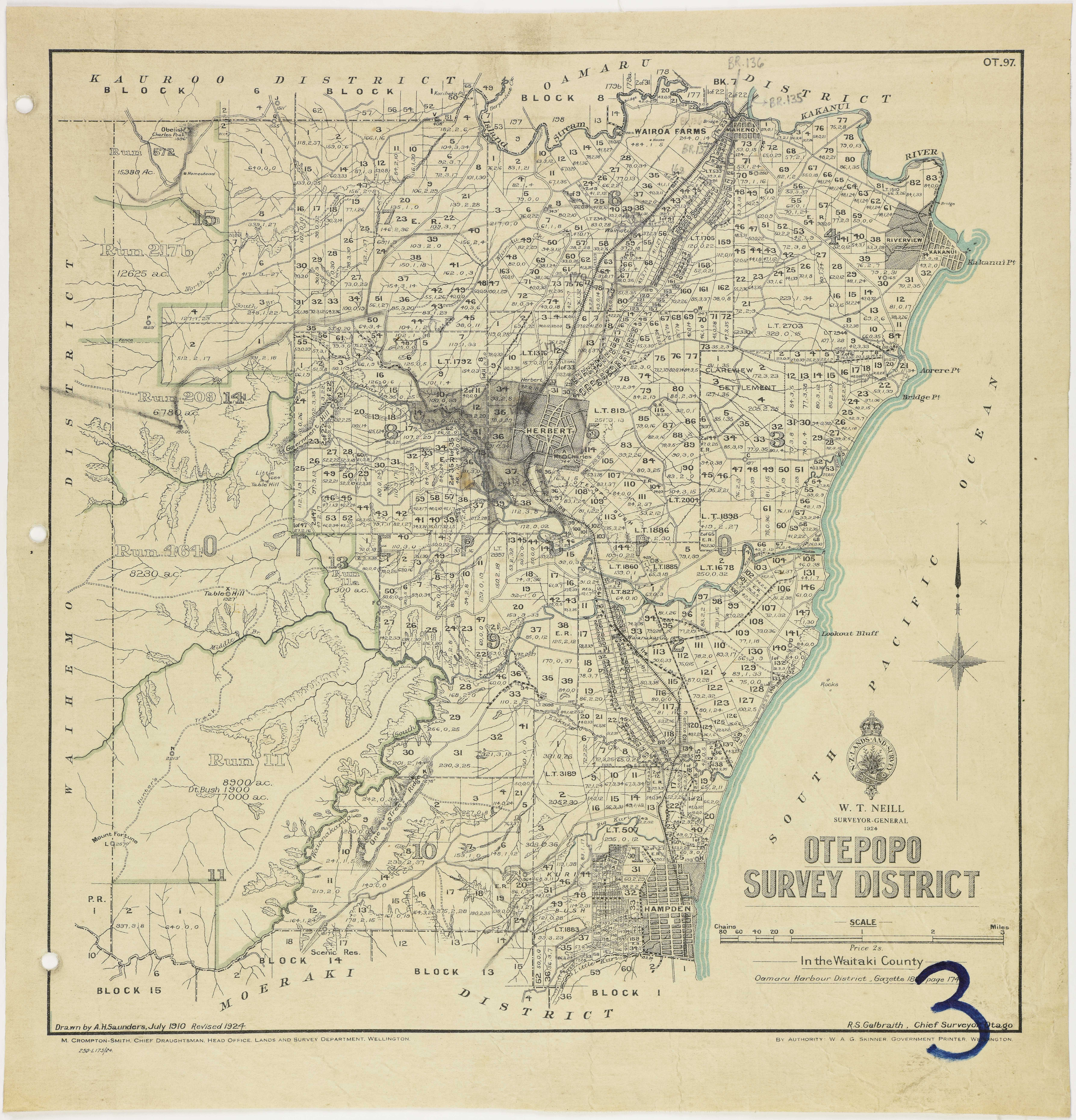
Cadastral map of the Otepopo Survey District

The Otepopo district is bounded by Island Stream and the Kakanui River in the North and Little Kuri Creek to the south, near Hampden. The district includes the settlements of Hampden, Otepopo, Kakanui, Maheno, Herbert, Reidston, and Waianakarua.

== History ==
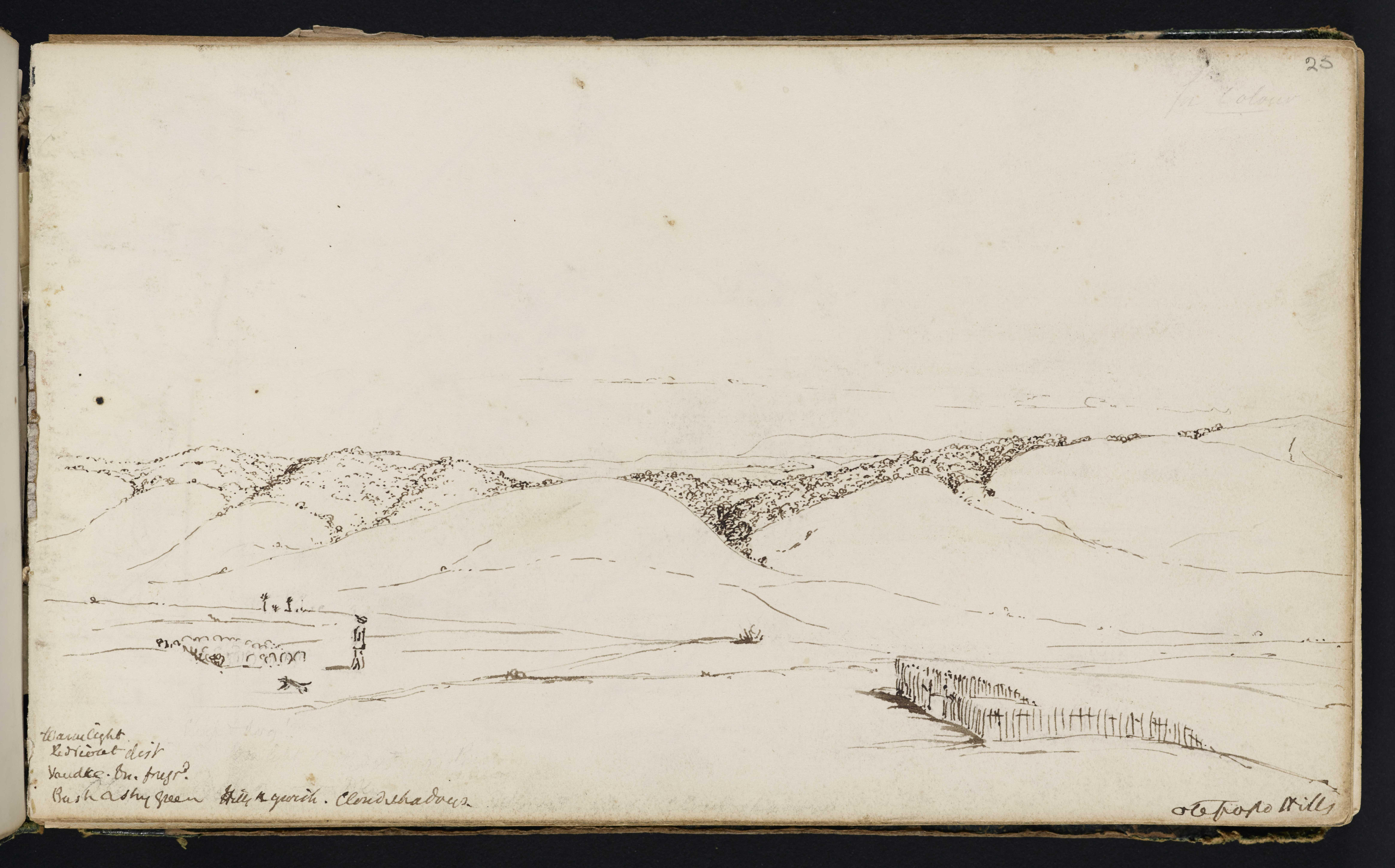
Walter Mantell's sketch of the Otepopo Hills, 1848

Charles Eberhard Suisted was the first settler of the district. Suisted was a Swedish settler who had a sheep station called Beaulieu on Mount Charles. (Note: The mountain was named after Suisted) By 1852 Suisted employed six shepherds and had four dwellings on his property. Suisted's run (Note: In New Zealand English a run is land used for the grazing of livestock) extended from the Waianakarua River to the Awamoa River. In July 1853 Walter Mantell warned Suisted that he could face prosecution over his clearing of the Otepopo Bush, Suisted had cleared all but 6 of 50 acres (20 ha) of bush. Mantell registered the remaining bush as a reserve, as he had done with the Kuri Woods near Hampden. Suisted renamed his station to Mount Pleasant and in 1855 sold part of the run to Edward McGlashan. By 1856 11 settlers were living in the Otepopo district. In 1861 Suisted's land was surveyed and subdivided into hundreds as part of the surveying of Block I. (Note: The division of land into hundreds was a way of disposing excess Crown Land by the provincial government)

The growth of the Otepopo district began following the construction of the road between Dunedin and Oamaru in the 1860s. The township (Note: In New Zealand English a township is a site reserved and laid out as a town, even if the settlement does not currently meet the criteria or definition of town) of Herbert was laid out in 1863. Herbert was the site of most the growth of Otepopo, by 1869 there was a Presbyterian church, school, hall, two blacksmiths, library, two hotels, and a cemetery on top of Mount Charles. In 1870 a landing was established on the coast to service the Otepopo district.

In 1870 the Fernyhaugh Flour Mill began construction on the banks of the Otepopo River, owing to financial difficulties and a controversial court case the mill did not open until April 1871 under new owners as the Otepopo Mills. The mill passed through several owners and was subject of another court case but by 1881 the mill was closed. (Note: A newspaper in 1881 noted the mill had been closed several years) The mill site became a picnic destination at the start of the 20th century and has remained such today, with the ruins being registered as a category 2 building with Heritage New Zealand.

Several attempts at establishing industry in the district took place, with a slate quarry supplying to multiple buildings in the district and several coal mines. Ultimately agriculture remained the dominant economic venture and Herbert became the main service town for the district, with a dairy factory opening in 1894.

== Governance ==
Otepopo was a riding of Waitaki County.

The Hampden Road Board governed Hampden as well as the nearby Kuri Bush Reserve.

== Notable people ==
- Annie Isabella James (1884–1965), Presbyterian medical missionary. Born in Otepopo.
- Angus Ross OBE MC* ED (1911 - 2000), New Zealand soldier and historian.
- Frances Ross (1869–1950), New Zealand school principal known as "a pioneer in women's education". Born in Otepopo.
