= Donna Ball =

American novelist

- Born: 1951 (age 74–75); North Georgia, US
- Occupation: Novelist
- Writing career
- Pen name: Donna Ball, Rebecca Flanders, Leigh Bristol (with Shannon Harper), Donna Carlisle, Taylor Brady (with Shannon Harper), Donna Boyd
- Period: 1982–present
- Genre: Romantic novel

Donna Ball (born 1951 in North Georgia, US) is an American writer of over 90 novels, mainly romantic novels since 1982, writing under her own name and with pen names Rebecca Flanders, Donna Carlisle and Donna Boyd. She also signed novels with Shannon Harper as Leigh Bristol and Taylor Brady.

== Biography ==
Donna Ball born in 1951 in the United States. Her ancestors were one of the first pioneer families of North Georgia, and her family still lives on the land they purchased from the Cherokee in 1782.

She published her first book in 1982 as Donna Ball and since then has written novels under other pseudonyms: Rebecca Flanders, Donna Carlisle and Donna Boyd. She also signed novels with Shannon Harper as Leigh Bristol and Taylor Brady.

Donna has given numerous print and broadcast interviews and has been quoted by such publications as the Detroit Free Press, the Atlanta Journal-Constitution, T.V. Guide, and Family Circle, as well as having appeared on such television programs as Entertainment Tonight and Lifestyles of the Rich and Famous. She also operates an online dog-training Web site and is a volunteer puppy raiser for a national service dog organization.

Donna lives in a restored turn-of-the-century barn in the heart of the Blue Ridge Mountains in the northeast Georgia with her dogs, they have won numerous awards for agility, obedience, and canine musical freestyle. Her hobbies include oil painting, hiking and dog obedience training.

== Bibliography ==
=== As Donna Ball ===
==== Stand alone novels ====
- Summer Masquerade (1982)
- Winners (1983)
- Cry in the Woods (1991)
- The Darkest Hour (1992)
- Exposure (1996)
- Just Before Dawn (1997)
- Dark Angel (1998)

==== Raine Stockton Dog Mystery series ====
1. Rapid Fire (2006)
2. Smoky Mountain Tracks (2006)
3. Gun Shy (2007)
4. Bone Yard (2011)
5. Silent Night (2011)
6. The Dead Season (2012)
7. High on Trial (2012)
8. All That Glitters (2012)

==== Omnibus in Collaboration ====
- Sweet Tea and Jesus Shoes (2000) (with Sandra Chastain, Debra Dixon, Virginia Ellis, Nancy Knight and Deborah Smith)
- Mossy Creek (2001) (with Sandra Chastain, Debra Dixon, Virginia Ellis, Nancy Knight and Deborah Smith)

=== As Rebecca Flanders ===
==== Stand alone novels ====
- Falkone's Promise (1983)
- Modern Girl (1983)
- Morning Song (1983)
- A Matter of Trust (1983)
- Best of Friends (1983)
- Twice in a Lifetime (1984)
- Suddenly Love (1984)
- Second Sight (1984)
- Gilded Heart (1984)
- Daydreams (1984)
- Silver Threads (1984)
- Afterglow (1985)
- Desert Fire (1985)
- Easy Access (1985)
- Open Hands (1985)
- Rainbows and Unicorns (1985)
- Growing Season (1985)
- Uncertain Images (1985)
- The Last Frontier (1985)
- Minor Miracles (1986)
- Painted Sunsets (1986)
- The Straight Game (1986)
- Obsessions (1986)
- Satin Fires (1986)
- After the Storm: Mississippi (1986)
- Search the Heavens (1988)
- Earthbound (1990)
- Under the Mistletoe (1991)
- Yesterday Comes Tomorrow (1992)
- Once upon a Time (1992)
- Sunchasers (1993)
- Forever Always (1993)
- The Last Real Man (1993)
- Kissed by the Sea (1994)

==== Century of American Dreams Series Multi-Author ====
- The Sensation: 1920s (1990)

==== Timetwist Series Multi-Author ====
- Quinn's Way (1994)

==== Dreamscapes : Whispers of Love Series Multi-Author ====
- Secret of the Wolf (1995)
- Wolf in Waiting (1995)
- Shadow of the Wolf (1995)

=== As Leigh Bristol ===
==== Stand alone novels ====
- Amber Skies (1987)
- Scarlet Sunrise (1987)
- Silver Twilight (1987)
- Hearts of Fire (1988)
- Sunswept (1990)
- Twice Blessed (1991)
- Angel (1992)
- Legacy (1993)

=== As Donna Carlisle ===
==== Stand alone novels ====
- Under Cover (1988)
- A Man Around the House (1989)
- Interlude (1989)
- Matchmaker, Matchmaker (1990)
- The Stormriders (1991)
- For Keeps (1991)
- It's Only Make Believe (1992)
- Cast Adrift (1992)
- Stealing Savannah (1994)
- The Message in the Miracles (2003)

=== As Taylor Brady ===
==== Kincaids series ====
1. Raging Rivers (1992)
2. Prairie Thunder (1993)
3. Mountain Fury (1993)
4. Westward Winds (1993)

=== As Donna Boyd ===
==== Devoncroix Dynasty series ====
1. The Passion (1998)
2. The Promise (1999)
3. Renegade (2011)

==== Single Novels ====
- The Alchemist (2002)
- The Awakening (2003)

== References and sources ==
- Donna Ball, Rebecca Flanders, Leigh Bristol, Donna Carlisle, Taylor Brady and Donna Boyd at Fantastic Fiction
