= Anne James =

Ann(e) or Annie James may refer to:

- Ann James (born 1952), author and illustrator
- Anne James (actress) in Barbed Wire (1952 film)
- Ann James (artist) (1925–2011), English-born Canadian artist
- Anne James (International Justice Project), honoured in 2006 New Year Honours
- Annie Isabella James (1884–1965), New Zealand Presbyterian missionary
- Annie Laurie Wilson James (1862–?), American journalist
- Annie James, character in The Parent Trap (1998 film)

== See also ==
- Anne Scott-James
- Anna James (disambiguation)
