= Elizabeth Thornton =

British-Canadian pseudonymous novelist (Mary Forrest George née Baxter; 1940–2010)

- Born: Mary Forrest Baxter; 24 January 1940; Aberdeen, Scotland, United Kingdom
- Died: 12 July 2010 (aged 70); Winnipeg, Manitoba, Canada
- Occupation: Novelist
- Spouse: Forbes George
- Children: 3
- Writing career
- Period: 1980–2010
- Genre: Historical romance
- Website: www.elizabeththornton.com

Mary Forrest George (née Baxter; 24 January 1940 – 12 July 2010), who wrote as Elizabeth Thornton (her mother's name), was a British-Canadian writer of 31 historical romance novels from 1986 to 2010.

== Biography ==
Born Mary Forrest Baxter on 24 January 1940 Aberdeen, Scotland, the younger of two children of Elizabeth Thornton and Andrew Baxter. In 1959, she married Forbes George, and they had three sons: Stephen, Peter and Thomas.

She was an elementary school teacher before establishing the St. Swithin Street Nursery School in 1967. In 1969, she and her husband and their three sons moved to Winnipeg, Manitoba, Canada, where she continued her teaching career. In 1977, she was appointed as a Pastoral Assistant of a Presbyterian Church in Winnipeg. In 1985, she completed an honors degree in Classical Greek winning the Gold Medal in Classics. Her honor's thesis was entitled "Women in Euripides."

She published her first novel in 1987 as Elizabeth Thornton, her mother's maiden name, and a year later she became a full-time writer.

Mary George died on July 12, 2010, in Winnipeg, Manitoba, Canada.

== Bibliography ==
=== Single novels ===
- Bluestocking Bride November 1987 ISBN 0-8217-7537-5
- A Virtuous Lady March 1988 ISBN 0-8217-2314-6
- The Passionate Prude October 1988 reprinted as To Love an Earl in 2004 ISBN 0-8217-7600-2
- Fallen Angel April 1989 ISBN 0-8217-7606-1
- The Worldly Widow January 1990 ISBN 0-8217-7714-9
- Scarlet Angel August 1990 reprinted October 2005 ISBN 0-8217-7713-0
- Highland Fire January 1994 ISBN 0-8217-7494-8
- The Bride's Bodyguard April 1997 reprinted September 2006 ISBN 0-553-58923-7
- You Only Love Twice March 1998 ISBN 0-553-57426-4
- Strangers at Dawn November 1999 ISBN 0-553-58117-1
- Shady Lady February 2004 ISBN 0-553-58490-1

=== The Seers of Grampian series ===
1. The Runaway McBride February 2009 ISBN 0-425-22634-4
2. The Scot and I June 2009 ISBN 0-425-22832-0
3. A Bewitching Bride 2010

=== Devereux Family Saga series ===
1. Tender the Storm May 1991 ISBN 1-55817-516-4
2. Velvet is the Night April 1992 ISBN 1-55817-598-9
3. Cherished September 1993 ISBN 0-8217-7389-5

=== Dangerous series ===
1. Dangerous to Love June 1994 ISBN 0-553-58924-5
2. Dangerous to Kiss April 1995 ISBN 0-553-57372-1
3. Dangerous to Hold April 1996 ISBN 0-553-57479-5

=== Princess series ===
1. Whisper his Name March 1999 ISBN 0-553-57427-2
2. Princess Charming February 2001 ISBN 0-553-58120-1
3. The Perfect Princess November 2001 ISBN 0-553-58123-6
4. Almost a Princess January 2003 ISBN 0-553-58774-9
5. Shady Lady is in some ways a continuation of this series

=== The Trap series ===
1. The Marriage Trap July 2005 ISBN 0-553-58753-6
2. The Bachelor Trap April 2006 ISBN 0-553-58754-4
3. The Pleasure Trap July 2007 ISBN 0-553-58957-1

=== Anthologies in collaboration ===
- "Sheer Sorcery" in Christmas Holiday November 1990
- "The Trouble with Angels" in My Guardian Angel February 1995 (with Sandra Chastain, Kay Hooper, Susan Krinard and Karyn Monk)
