= Angus Ross (historian) =

New Zealand historian, military officer (1911–2000)

Angus Ross OBE MC* ED
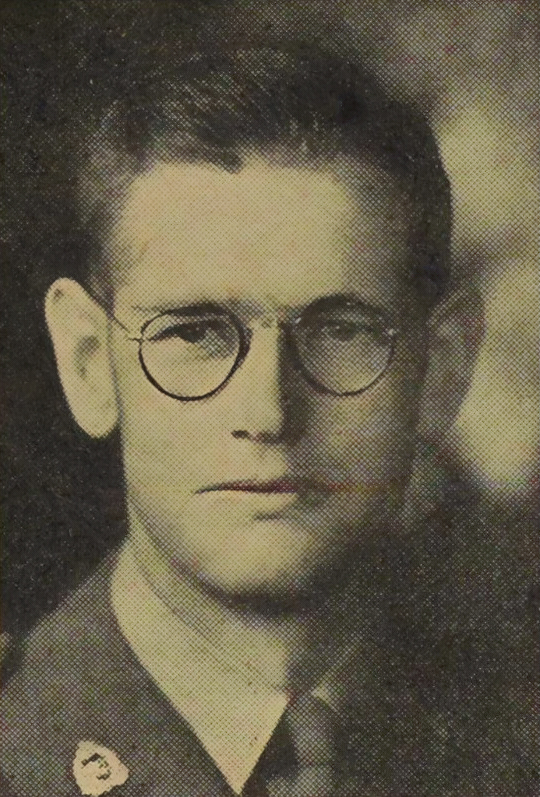
- Ross during World War II
- Born: 19 July 1911; Otepopo, New Zealand
- Died: 24 May 2000 (aged 88); Dunedin, New Zealand
- Relatives: Jocelyn Harris (step-daughter); Frances Ross (aunt); Angus Ross (grandson)

Academic background
- Education: King's College, Cambridge

Academic work
- Discipline: History
- Sub-discipline: New Zealand military and political history
- Institutions: University of Otago
- Main interests: History of New Zealand's foreign policy and the campaign to develop a stance more independent of Britain and the United States
- Military career
- Branch: New Zealand Military Forces
- Service years: 1939–1945
- Rank: Lieutenant colonel
- Service number: 13086
- Units: 2nd New Zealand Division, 2NZEF (1939–1945)
- Conflicts: Second World War; Battle of Greece; North African campaign; Western Desert campaign; Second Battle of El Alamein; Italian campaign; Moro River campaign
- Awards: MC and bar; Mention in despatches; Cross of Valour (Greece)

Angus Ross OBE MC* ED (19 July 1911 – 24 May 2000) was a New Zealand historian with a particular interest in the history and development of New Zealand's foreign policy. He was a professor of history at the University of Otago from 1965 until his retirement in 1976.

Ross joined the teaching faculty at Otago in 1934, after his master's thesis on Te Pūoho's raid was judged the best in New Zealand in its year. His early publications promoted a more nationalist foreign policy for New Zealand. Ross volunteered for the war effort in 1940, seeing it as a "morally just" cause.

He fought as an officer in the 23rd Canterbury-Otago Battalion in Greece, North Africa and Italy. He was awarded the Military Cross and Bar, as well as the Greek Cross of Valour. On his return to New Zealand, he wrote the battalion's official history and remained active in the army as Commanding Officer 1st Battalion Otago and Southland Regiment and then honorary colonel of the 4th Battalion, New Zealand Infantry Regiment.

Ross was appointed professor of history at Otago in 1964, and was active on the vice-chancellors' committee and in university administration. Ross retired in 1976, and lived in Dunedin for the rest of his life.

His PhD thesis was published as a book, New Zealand Aspirations in the Pacific in the Nineteenth Century. As an elder of the Dunedin Presbyterian Church, Ross wrote its centennial history in 1960.

== Early life and family ==
Ross was born in 1911 on a farm in the Otepopo district of Otago, New Zealand. His aunt, Frances Ross, the founding principal of Columba College, supported Angus and his cousin Tom Ross to pursue their secondary and tertiary education. He attended Waitaki Boys' High School and then the University of Otago.

In 1937, Ross married fellow student Reda Mackenzie, a great-granddaughter of John Bryce. In 1940, they co-authored the section on the gold rushes in the official 1940 New Zealand Centennial Surveys. They had one son, Bruce Ross, later vice-Chancellor of Lincoln University and chief executive of the Ministry of Agriculture and Forestry. Reda died in 1949 while Ross was studying overseas. In 1951, he married Margot Wood (née Garrett), also an Otago MA graduate in history, and became step-father to her daughter Jocelyn Harris, who went on to become a professor of English literature at the University of Otago.

== Military service ==
Ross fought as an officer in the 23rd Canterbury-Otago battalion in Greece, North Africa, and Italy. He was awarded the Military Cross and Bar, as well as the Greek Cross of Valour. On his return to New Zealand he wrote the battalion's history and remained active in the army as Commanding Officer 1st Battalion Otago and Southland Regiment from 1951 to 1954.

== Academic career ==
In 1933 he was considered the best New Zealand history student by British external examiners. His Master's thesis, a study of Te Pūoho's raid on Murihiku, "revealed an interest in Maori history that was generations ahead of its time". As part of his research, he followed Te Pūoho's "astonishing journey" on foot, including crossing the Haast Pass many years before the current road was built.

Ross worked as assistant lecturer in the History Department from 1934 until 1940, gradually taking over more and more of the teaching responsibilities as Professor Elder's eyesight deteriorated.

After demobilisation, Ross studied for a PhD at King's College, Cambridge, and was appointed a fellow of St John's.

On his return to New Zealand, Ross wrote the official war history of his battalion, the 23rd Canterbury-Otago, for the Official History of New Zealand in the Second World War 1939–45 series. The book was published in 1959. The series' editor and Ross's war-time commander, Major-General Howard Kippenberger, noted that Ross was "the only person not in it".

Ross was appointed professor of history at Otago in 1964; his predecessor William Morrell became a professorial fellow. Ross published New Zealand's Aspirations in the Pacific in the Nineteenth Century in 1964, followed by a volume of essays New Zealand's Record in the Twentieth-Century Pacific in 1969. According to Erik Olssen in his obituary of Ross, "both works remain the standard authorities on their subject" and they increased awareness of "the implications of our geographic and historical situation and of the dual racial origins of our people", which meant that New Zealanders needed to take "a keen interest in the islands of the South Pacific".

In the 1970s, Ross published on New Zealand's external relations during the inter-war period.

As professor during a time of rapid growth in New Zealand universities, Ross was very influential in setting the direction of the Department of History for the following decades. Notable appointments included Michael Cullen for economic history, Dorothy Page for women's history, Ann Trotter for East Asian studies, and Erik Olssen for social history.

== Honours and awards ==
The Military Cross was awarded in 1943 for his actions in the battle of Takrouna, where as Captain, he drove a wireless vehicle through severe fire to establish communications with supporting artillery units. The Bar to his Military Cross was awarded in 1944, for his "cheerfulness ... and ferocious initiative" in leading D Company at Orsogna.

The Greek government awarded him the Aristeion Andreias Cross of Valour for "assisting 3 Greek Mountain Brigade in training and during the battles of Rimini, Bellaria and Rubicone in Italy 1944, as Brigade Major 5 New Zealand Brigade".

In 1953, Ross was awarded the Queen Elizabeth II Coronation Medal. In the 1980 New Year Honours, he was appointed an Officer of the Order of the British Empire for services to historical research and education.

== Death and legacy ==
Ross died on 24 May 2000, at the age of 89.

The Angus Ross Prize is awarded annually by the Otago University Council, on the recommendation of the Pro-Vice-Chancellor (Humanities), to the best student in at least four 300-level history papers in the same year. The Reda Ross Prize in History is offered to the best student in first-year history at Otago.

Labour deputy Prime Minister Sir Michael Cullen credited Ross with bringing him to New Zealand; Ross hired Cullen as a lecturer in 1971. On the other side of New Zealand's political divide, the National Party Cabinet minister Hugh Templeton credited Ross's teaching and support for securing him a Rhodes Scholarship.

== Selected publications ==
=== Authored books ===
- 23 Battalion War History Branch, Department of Internal Affairs, Wellington (1959)
- New Zealand's Aspirations in the Pacific in the Nineteenth Century Clarendon Press (1964)

=== Edited books ===
- New Zealand's Record in the Twentieth-Century Pacific (Auckland, 1969)

=== Articles and shorter works ===
- Ross, A. (1976). They built in faith: A short history of Knox Church, 1860-1976. Dunedin: Crown Print.
- Ross, Angus. "Frances Jane Ross". Dictionary of New Zealand Biography, first published 1996. Te Ara - the Encyclopedia of New Zealand.
