= Lorraine Monk =

Canadian photographer (1922–2020)

Lorraine Monk OC OOnt
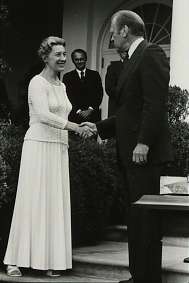
- Monk meets Gerald Ford during the United States Bicentennial, 1976
- Born: Lorraine Althea Constance Spurrell; May 26, 1922; Montreal, Quebec, Canada
- Died: December 17, 2020 (aged 98); Toronto, Ontario, Canada
- Education: McGill University
- Awards: Order of Canada (1983); Queen's Golden Jubilee Medal (2002); Order of Ontario (2007)

Lorraine Althea Constance Monk OC OOnt D.Litt (née Spurrell; May 26, 1922 – December 17, 2020) was a Canadian curator, author and executive producer with the National Film Board of Canada who led the production of multiple photography projects chronicling Canadian culture from the 1960s onward. She worked to establish the Canadian Museum of Photography in Toronto, which spawned multiple satellite museums across the country. Over 160,000 of the photographs that she commissioned to detail contemporary Canada are housed at the National Gallery of Canada. She also led the publication of photography books including Canada: A Year of the Land, Call Them Canadians, Canada with Love, Between Friends (which was Canada's gift to the United States on its bicentennial in 1976), and Photographs that Changed the World.

For her contributions in documenting contemporary history of the country and her encouragement of a generation of photographers, she was first made a Member of the Order of Canada (1973) and later made an Officer of the Order of Canada (1983). She was also a recipient of the Queen Elizabeth II Golden Jubilee Medal (2002), and Order of Ontario (2007).

== Early life ==
Lorraine Althea Constance Spurrell was born on May 26, 1922, in Montreal to Eileen Marion (née Nurse) and Edwin Spurrell. Both her parents were from Newfoundland and Labrador, and had relocated to Quebec. Her father was a cod fisherman who had fought in World War I. Her mother was the niece of the then Archbishop of Newfoundland and was raised in his house.

She was the first in her family to complete a university education when she received a Bachelor of Arts degree in history and sociology in 1944, with honours in sociology; and a Master of Arts degree in 1946 from McGill University. Her MA thesis was titled The Sociology of Art. She dropped out of her doctorate program because she fell ill with tuberculosis.

== Career ==
Monk started her career in Ottawa, where she worked for the government, writing the history of the Royal Canadian Navy during World War II. In 1957, she joined the National Film Board of Canada (NFB) to write captions for their photo stories. These photos would be used in newspapers and magazines across the world.

In 1960, Monk was made the executive producer of the Photo Services at the NFB, whose name she would later go on to change to Still Photography Division. The group had a mandate to provide photographs to various government departments. Over a period of time, she would move away from in-house photographers and look to freelance photographers who would be commissioned for works. She and others at the Still Photography Division grew frustrated with what Payne calls the "cheerful didacticism" of NFB production at the time, arguing in favour of a more documentary-oriented style of photography. She inaugurated the NFB Photo Gallery in Ottawa in 1967, which was Canada's first photo gallery dedicated to contemporary Canadian photography. She also started a program of touring photography exhibitions that toured both Canada and internationally.

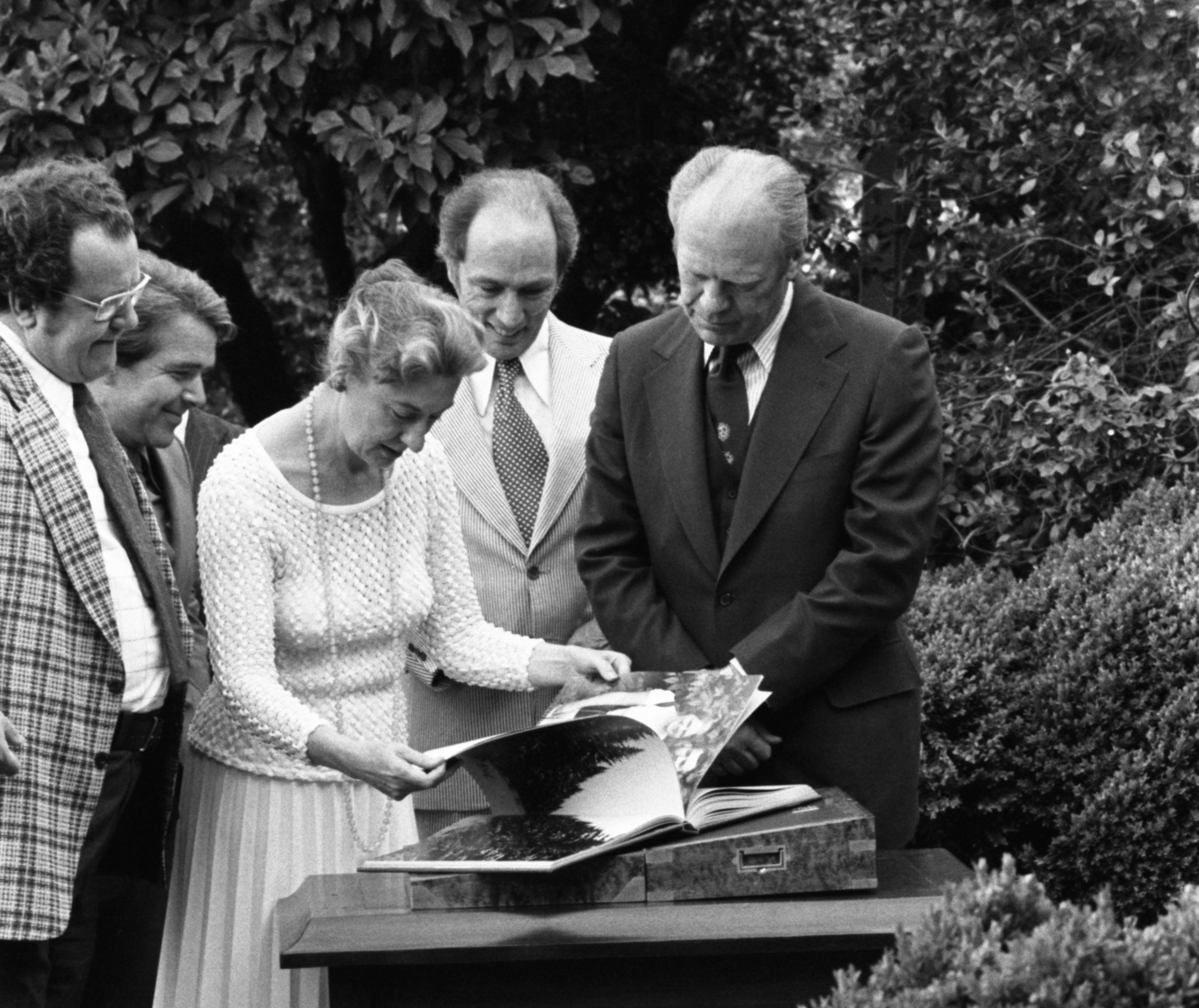
Monk and Prime Minister Pierre Trudeau (middle) showing President Gerald Ford Between Friends / Entre Amis, Canada's bicentennial gift to the United States (1976)

Monk would leave Ottawa to move to Toronto in 1980, where she would continue to organize photography exhibitions and produce photo books. In 1985, she helped establish the Canadian Museum of Contemporary Photography in Toronto with satellite museums in other cities.

Through her career, Monk is credited with having commissioned photographs that detail the landscapes, people, and culture of the country, including books such as Canada: A Year of the Land, Call Them Canadians, and Canada with Love. The photography projects that she commissioned during her role with the Still Photography Division would not only contribute to the cultural documentation of the country, but would also encourage a whole generation of photographers. Over 160,000 of these photographs are at the National Gallery of Canada. In an article in The Globe and Mail, the newspaper noted that her role at the NFB's Still Photography Division coincided with the time that "photographs were not merely vehicles of information or reportage but a means of personal expression and a collectible art form".

Monk's photo book, Between Friends / Entre Amis (1976), was designed as Canada's gift to the United States for the United States Bicentennial in 1976. Monk accompanied then Canadian Prime Minister Pierre Trudeau to hand over the gift to then US President Gerald Ford in a ceremony in Washington, D.C. The 262-page photo book documented the life, scenes, and people, from both sides of the shared border between the two countries. Anna Porter, editor-in-chief at McClelland & Stewart, the publishing house that published much of Monk's works, complimented her on her judgement, and went on to say that Between Friends / Entre Amis (1976), "became the gift book of the decade".

Some of Monk's notable award winning photobooks included Photographs that Changed the World (1989) and Canada: These Things We Hold Dear (1999). Some of the photographers whom she encouraged through her career included Thaddeus Holownia, John Max, Freeman Patterson, Nina Raginsky, John Reeves, and John de Visser.

Monk was a member of the board of the Roloff Beny Foundation starting in 1998. In this position she helped create an annual prize for the best photo book, which was discontinued in 2004.

== Honours ==
In 1973, she was made a Member of the Order of Canada "for the standard of excellence she has set in the publication and exhibition of photography and for the support she has given to young photographers". She was promoted to Officer in 1983. In 2007, she was awarded the Order of Ontario for having "brought acclaim to Ontario through her contributions as a photographer". She was also awarded the Canadian Centennial Medal and the Queen Elizabeth II Golden Jubilee Medal in 2002. In 1982, she received an honorary degree from York University and another from Carleton University.

Many of her books were recipients of awards, including Canada (1975) which was the recipient of the silver medal at the Leipzig Book Fair, and Between Friends (1976) which won the gold medal at the Leipzig Book Fair.

== Personal life ==
Monk's first marriage to Lloyd Hackwell ended in divorce after the birth of their daughter, after which she moved back with her parents who took care of the daughter when she worked. When she moved to Ottawa, she married John Monk, with whom she had gone to university at McGill University. John had returned injured from having fought in World War II. In order to support John through law school at Osgoode Hall Law School, Lorraine took on a job at the Department of National Defence, researching the history of the Royal Canadian Navy. The couple had two sons and a daughter, author Karyn Monk, and were married until John's death in 1979. In 2010 Monk married Daniel Fernandez, a music composer.

In the 1980s, Monk lost money to fraudster Albert Rosenberg, nicknamed Yorkville Swindler, who promised returns on reselling a Picasso painting only to defraud her. This incident would impact her negatively, and she would later say in a court hearing that she had considered death by suicide due to this incident.

Monk died on December 17, 2020, at a nursing home in Toronto, Ontario. She was aged 98.

== Selected bibliography ==
- Canada, National Film Board of (1967). Canada: A Year of the Land. Copp Clark Pitman. ISBN 978-0-7730-4036-6.
- National Film Board of Canada; Monk, Lorraine; Lasnier, Rina (1968). Ces visages qui sont un pays: recueillis par des photographes du Canada. Imprimeur de la Reine. OCLC 959666473.
- Canada; Public Works and Government Services Canada (1996). Stones of history. Public Works and Government Services Canada. ISBN 978-0-662-62548-3. OCLC 46494461.
- Canada, National Film Board of; Waddington, Miriam (1968). Call Them Canadians: A Photographic Point of View. Queen's Printer.
- National Film Board of Canada; Monk, Lorraine (1971). A time to dream. McClelland & Stewart. ISBN 978-0-7710-0148-2. OCLC 796952513.
- Development, Organisation for Economic Co-operation and (1973). Canada: 1973. OECD.
- Division, National Film Board of Canada Still Photography (1976). Between Friends. National Film Board of Canada, Still Photography Division.
- Monk, Lorraine; National Film Board of Canada; Still Photography Division (1975). The female eye = Coup d'oeil feminin. Produced by the National Film Board of Canada, Still Photography Division, in association with Clarke, Irwin. OCLC 969568593.
- Monk, Lorraine (1982). Canada with love = Canada avec amour (Patriation ed.). Toronto: McClelland and Stewart. ISBN 0-7710-6082-3. OCLC 9760919.
- Amiel, Barbara; Monk, Lorraine (1983). Celebrate our city: Toronto : 150th anniversary. McClelland and Stewart. ISBN 978-0-7710-6085-4. OCLC 1131586664.
- Monk, Lorraine (1989). Photographs that changed the world: the camera as witness, the photograph as evidence. Macfarlane Walter & Ross. ISBN 978-0-921912-01-9. OCLC 1065441775.
- Monk, Lorraine (1993). Canada with love = Canada avec amour. Firefly Books. ISBN 978-1-895565-27-0. OCLC 28224923.
- Infobase; National Film Board of Canada (Firm) (2019). To Canada with Love and Some Misgivings. OCLC 1130900082.

== Sources ==
- Gould, Allan M. (June 1982). "Lorraine Monk: Woman with a Mission". Chatelaine. 55 (6). ProQuest 1715352519.
- Payne, Carol (2013). The Official Picture: The National Film Board of Canada's Still Photography Division and the Image of Canada, 1941–1971. McGill–Queen's University Press. ISBN 978-0-7735-8894-3. JSTOR j.ctt24hnf4. OCLC 1037916154.
