= Karyn Monk =

Canadian writer

- Born: Karyn Monk; 1960 (age 65–66); Ottawa, Ontario
- Education: University of Toronto
- Occupation: Novelist
- Partner: Scott
- Children: 3
- Relatives: Lorraine Monk (mother)
- Writing career
- Pen name: Karyn Monk
- Period: 1994 - 2005
- Genre: Romance
- Website: www.karynmonk.com

Karyn Monk is a Canadian author of historical romance novels. Her books have appeared on the USA Today Bestseller List, and have won numerous awards.

== Biography ==
=== Personal life ===
Monk is the fourth child of John and Lorraine (Spurrell) Monk. Because her parents had expected a boy, they had not chosen a girl's name, and decided to name their new daughter after the delivery room nurse. Neither parent was sure how to spell the name "Karen," though, leading to the unique spelling they chose.

Monk graduated from university with a degree in history. She planned to work in advertising and in her spare time perform in local musicals. While auditioning for a part in an original musical called "Last Tango in Fargo North Dakota," she met her future husband, Philip, who was that show's music director. The marriage produced three children: Genevieve (b 1998), Carson (b 2001), and Adelaide (b 2005). The family lives in Toronto, Ontario.

=== Writing career ===
With her husband's support, Monk soon left her job in fashion advertising to pursue her dream of writing. After two years of work on her first manuscript, she obtained an agent, who eventually sold her book, "Surrender to a Stranger," to Bantam. The novel was later nominated for Best First Book by Romantic Times. A USAToday bestselling author, Monk has received critical acclaim for her sensual, powerful novels. She has been awarded many honors, including the Aspen Gold, Barclay Gold, the National Readers' Choice Award, and a Romantic Times Career Achievement Award.

Monk took a break from writing, beginning in 2005, to spend time with her three young children.

== Awards and recognition ==
- 1995 - Romantic Times nominee for Best First Historical Romance, Surrender to a Stranger
- 1998 - Romantic times nominee for The Witch and the Warrior
- 2003 - Romantic Times Career Achievement Award for Historical Adventure
- 2004 - Daphne du Maurier Award winner for Mystery/Suspense for My Favorite Thief
- 2004 - Second place in the Barclay Gold Award for My Favorite Thief
- 2004 - Romance Writers of America RITA Award finalist for My Favorite Thief
- 2004 - Golden Quill Award finalist for My Favorite Thief
- 2004 - Aspen Gold Award finalist for My Favorite Thief
- 2004 - Orange Rose Award finalist for My Favorite Thief
- 2004 - Booksellers' Best Award finalist for My Favorite Thief
- 2005 - Aspen Gold Award winner for Every Whispered Word
- 2005 - Daphne du Maurier Award for Excellence in Mystery/Suspense winner for Every Whispered Word
- 2005 - Romantic Times Nominee, Every Whispered Word

== Bibliography ==
=== Single novels ===
- Surrender to a Stranger, 1994
- The Rebel and the Redcoat, 1996

=== Warriors Series ===
1. Once a Warrior, 1997
2. The Witch and the Warrior, 1998
3. The Rose and the Warrior, 2000

=== Kent Family Saga Series ===
1. The Prisoner, 2001
2. The Wedding Escape, 2003
3. My Favorite Thief, 2004
4. Every Whispered Word, 2005

=== Anthologies in collaboration ===
- "Saving Celeste" in the anthology MY GUARDIAN ANGEL, 1995 (with Sandra Chastain, Kay Hooper, Susan Krinard and Elizabeth Thornton)
