= Frances Ross =

New Zealand school principal

Frances Jane Ross
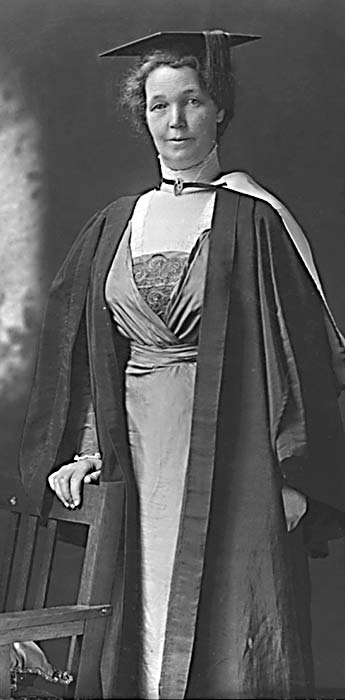
- Born: 1869
- Died: 1950 (aged 80–81)
- Relatives: Angus Ross (nephew)

Frances Jane Ross (1869–1950) was a New Zealand school principal known as "a pioneer in women's education".

== Early life and education ==
She was born in 1869 at Rosebury farm in Otepopo, to a Scots father and Irish mother.

Frances Ross was an early woman graduate of the University of Otago. She was awarded her BA in 1890, and an MA in 1900.

Before enrolling at the university, Ross had been a foundation pupil of Girton College, a Dunedin school founded by Otago's first woman graduate Caroline Freeman. After her BA, she returned to Girton as first assistant. She took over as the school's principal and owner when Freeman moved to her second Girton College in Christchurch.

Her family remembered her warmly for her support for their education.

== Career ==
Ross was the founding principal of Columba College, a Presbyterian secondary school for boarders and day girls. Ross was keen to give the girls a broad education. She noted that New Zealand was new and it needed its women to make a contribution in a variety of ways.

She retired from Columba College in 1930 and she was replaced by Grace Mackintosh who came from Scotland to take up her first headship. Ross continued as a school governor and she took up voluntary work for the Young Women's Christian Association of New Zealand. She was a member of its Dunedin board from 1930 until 1944, Dunedin president for three years, and World YWCA Council member for six years. In 1944 she was made a life member of the Dunedin YWCA.

During the Second World War, Frances Ross returned to the teaching workforce as warden of St Margaret's College, principal of the Dunedin Presbyterian Women's Training Institute, and teacher at St Hilda's Collegiate School.
