= John Mackintosh (historian) =

Scottish historian

John Mackintosh (1833–1907) was a Scottish historian known for writing The History of Civilisation in Scotland.

== Life ==
The son of William Mackintosh, a soldier, he was born at Aberdeen on 9 November 1833, and was educated at Botriphinie parish school in Banffshire. At an early period he set up in Aberdeen as stationer and newsagent.

In 1880 Mackintosh received the degree of LL.D. from the University of Aberdeen, and in 1900 a civil list pension. He died at Aberdeen on 4 May 1907.

== Private life ==
He married Grace Knight and in 1890 their daughter Grace Mackintosh was born. Their daughter was a noted head of schools in New Zealand and the Presbyterian Ladies' College, Pymble, Sydney in Australia. She returned to the UK and lived with her brother John.

== Works ==
Self-taught in Scottish history, Mackintosh published:

- History of Civilisation in Scotland, four volumes 1878 to 1888, with a new edition appearing 1892–6.
- The Story of Scotland (1890),
- History of the Valley of the Dee (1895)
- Historical Earls and Earldoms (1898).

== Notes ==
=== Sources ===
- Mackintosh, John (1895). History of the valley of the Dee, from the earliest times to the present day. Aberdeen: Taylor and Henderson, printers.

Attribution

This article incorporates text from a publication now in the public domain: Stephen, Leslie, ed. (1885). "Mackintosh, John". Dictionary of National Biography. Vol. 2. London: Smith, Elder & Co.
