= Yves Beauchemin =

Canadian writer (born 1941)

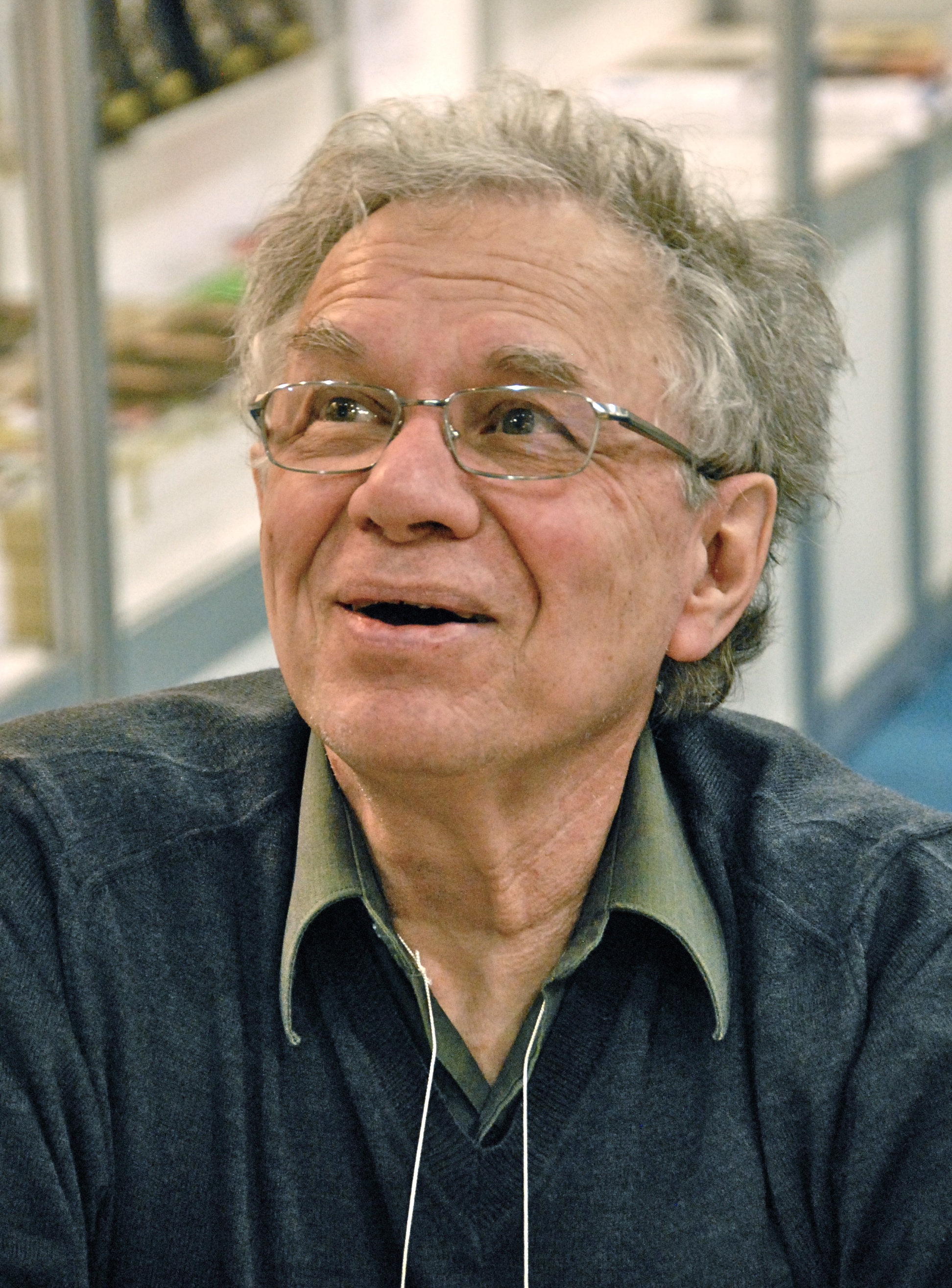
- Beauchemin in 2012
- Born: May 26, 1941 (age 85); Rouyn-Noranda, Quebec
- Education: Université de Montréal
- Occupation: Novelist

Yves Beauchemin OQ (IPA: [iv boʃəmɛ̃]; born 26 June 1941) is a Québécois novelist.

Born in Rouyn-Noranda and raised in the village of Clova, Beauchemin received his degree in French literature and art history at the Université de Montréal in 1965. He taught literature at the Collège Garneau and Université Laval. Beauchemin was working as an editor in a Montreal publishing firm when he began contributing essays and stories to magazines and newspapers. In 1969, he accepted a position as a researcher at Radio-Québec.

Beauchemin's first novel, L'enfirouapé (1974), won the Prix France-Québec. His second novel, Le Matou (1981), became the all-time best-selling novel in French Quebec literature and has been translated into seventeen languages. This book won the Prix de la ville de Montreal and the Prix du livre de l'ete Cannes in 1982. Beauchemin won the Prix Jean Giono for his third novel, Juliette Pomerleau (1989).

In his fiction Beauchemin is a detached but caring observer of the contemporary world around him. The panoramic canvases of his novels capture the teeming life of the streets, reflecting their author's appreciation of such great nineteenth-century writers as Balzac, Dickens, Dostoevsky, and Gogol.

On October 28, 2003, Yves Beauchemin was appointed Officier de l'Ordre national du Québec. There were 29 individuals chosen that year, including 5 Grand Officers, 7 Officers, and 17 Knights.

In 2006, he published his novel Les Empouchers.

Beauchemin's latest novel is Une nuit de tempête, 2023.

Seven of Yves Beauchemin's books have been translated into English. They include "The Alley Cat" (Le matou), "Juliette" (Juliette Pomerleau), "The Second Fiddle" (Le second violon), Charles the Bold (Charles le téméraire: Un temps du chien, Part 1), "The Years of Fire" (Charles le téméraire: Un temps du chien, Part 2), "A Very Bold Leap" (Un saut dans le vide), and "The Accidental Education of Jerome Lupien" (Les Empouchers). The final book of the Charles the Bold trilogy, Parti pour la gloire was never published in English. The English books versions were planned as a quartet as in English Un temps du chien was split into two books.

He resides in Longueuil, Quebec.

== Bibliography ==
=== Novels ===
- L'enfirouapé - La Presse, 1974 (Published by Jean Picollec, Paris as L'Entourloupe in 1985)
- Le matou - 1981 (translated as The Alley Cat by Sheila Fischman - McClelland & Stewart, 1986)
- Juliette Pomerleau - 1989 (translated as Juliette by Sheila Fischman - McClelland & Stewart, 1993), Grand prix des lectrices de Elle
- Le second violon - 1996 (translated as The Second Fiddle by David Homel - Stoddart Publishing, 1998) ISBN 0773730850
- Les émois d'un marchand de café - 1999 (reprinted as Le marchand de café)
- Charles le téméraire - Un temps de chien - 2004 - translated across two books:
  - (Charles The Bold: The Dog Years or Charles the Bold, Volume 1 by Wayne Grady, A Douglas Gibson Book, McClelland & Stewart, 2007) ISBN 0771011474 ISBN 0771011482
  - (The Years of Fire: Charles the Bold, Volume 2 by Wayne Grady, A Douglas Gibson Book, McClelland & Stewart, 2007) ISBN 0771011490 ISBN 0771012578
- Charles le téméraire - Un saut dans le vide - 2005 (translated as A Very Bold Leap: Charles the Bold, Volume 3 by Wayne Grady, A Douglas Gibson Book, McClelland & Stewart, 2009) ISBN 0771012586
- Charles le téméraire - Parti pour la gloire - 2006 (translation never published).
- Renard bleu, Éditions Fides, 2009 ISBN 978-2-7621-2882-6.
- La Serveuse du Café Cherrier, Éditions Michel Brûlé, 2011 ISBN 9782894855225, 2894855222.
- Charles le téméraire - Edition Fides, 2014 (All three parts in one book) ISBN 978-2-76213-855-9
- Les Empocheurs - 2016 (translated as The Accidental Education of Jerome Lupien by Wayne Grady, Arachnide Editions, 2019) ISBN 1487002807
- Une nuit de tempête, Éditions Québec/Amérique, 2023.ISBN 9782764446638, 2764446632.

=== Short story collections ===
- Une nuit à l’hôtel - 2001

=== Children's books ===
- Une histoire à faire japper - 1991
- Antoine et Alfred - 1992 (a story written for Nicolas Laperrière)
- Alfred sauve Antoine - 1996
- Alfred et la lune cassée - 1997
- Alfred - 2019 (Four stories, including Antoine et Alfred, Alfred sauve Antoine, Alfred et la lune cassée, and Alfred et le chat chauve)

=== Other works ===
- Du sommet d’un arbre - Quebec/Amerique, 1986 (Journal) ISBN 2890373002
- Le Calepin rouge - 2007 (Aphorisms)
- Un voyage en Russie - 2020 (Humor)

=== Short film ===
- Burlex (1971) - Black & white short film. Independent.

=== Collaborations ===
- L'avenir du francais au Quebec (avec Gaston miron et al.)
- Entretiens sur la passion de lire (avec Henri Tranquille)
- La Vache et d'autres animaux (1982)
- Cybèle (1982) Art Global, Montreal. Afterward by Jacques Godbout
- Finalement!... Les enfants (1991) (avec Andrée Ruffo) Art Global.
- Le Prix (libretto) Opus 53, Opera in One Act with composer Jacques Hétu - 1992 (opera). Premiered March 1993 in Montreal.
