= Caroline Freeman =

New Zealand teacher and school principal

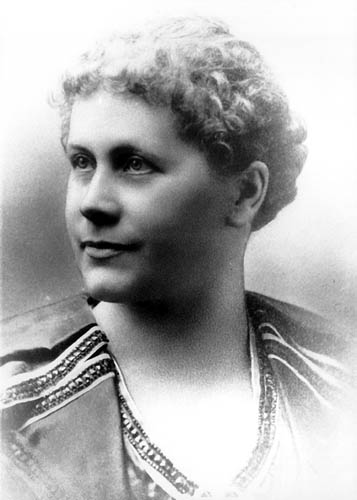
- Born: c. 1856 near Halifax, Yorkshire, England
- Died: 16 August 1914 (aged 58); Christchurch, New Zealand
- Known for: Opening Girton College in Dunedin and Christchurch; first female graduate of University of Otago

Caroline Freeman (c. 1856 – 16 August 1914) was a teacher, school principal and owner, and the first female graduate of the University of Otago, New Zealand.

== Early life ==
Freeman was born near Halifax, Yorkshire, England. Different sources give different dates for her birth, 13 August 1852 or about 1855 or 1856 (exact date unknown). She came to Otago, New Zealand, with five siblings and her parents, William and Anne Freeman, on the Nourmabal in 1858, surviving measles on the journey.

The Freemans farmed at Abbotsford, Green Island, New Zealand on a farm named "Abbots Royd". Freeman, educated at the small one-room Green Island School, was dux there in her final year.

== Education ==
Freeman was a pupil-teacher at Green Island School for four years. Her headmaster and mentor, A. G. Allen wrote about her: 'Caroline Freeman promises to become a very good pupil-teacher'.

Although Freeman had had no formal secondary education, she progressed from Green Island School to take the senior position of Infant Mistress at a large working class school, Caversham, in Dunedin. With the support of her headmaster, William Milne, she undertook study so that she might matriculate, that is, gain university entrance. She studied while working at Caversham, and at the end of 1877 she left to enrol at Otago University College. In 1878, she was the first woman to matriculate at the University of Otago; she passed the first section of her B.A. in 1881; and the second in 1885. She studied Classics, English and Latin, and although she failed several subjects during her studies, including history and political economy, she also won the prestigious Bowen Essay Prize, which was open to all New Zealand undergraduates. Her winning essay was on the subject "The Norman Conquest: its effect on the subsequent development of English institutions".

Freeman's studies were always part-time and never easy - she had a seven-mile walk from her home in Green Island to the university, for example, and this eventually took its toll on her health and she moved into rented rooms in town. Early in 1882, she was appointed first assistant at Otago Girls' High School. The position was re-advertised in December, the board possibly wanting an older, more experienced person in the role. Angry, Freeman resigned from the school staff.

Freeman was capped as Otago's first woman graduate on 27 August 1885, achieving a Bachelor of Arts degree after seven years of study. The graduation ceremony was a great celebration of her achievement; the audience clapped, cheered, sang and threw bouquets onto the stage. She had achieved her degree not through the usual route of completing high school and then studying full time at university with the support of a family, but through part-time study as an adult. Dr William Brown, speaking at the graduation ceremony, said the following about Caroline:

"I cannot conclude without a word of congratulation to Miss Freeman. No one knows so well as I do the difficulties she has had to contend with. She has shown such pluck and perseverance that, if she had been a fighting man instead of a studious woman, she would have merited decoration. I am pleased, therefore, to hail her as the first lady graduate from the Otago University."

== Career and professional life ==
In 1886, in Dunedin, Freeman opened her own school, Girton College - the name was taken from that of an educational facility for women at Cambridge University, England. She began with four girls in a disused hall but moved to better premises where she had 60 pupils and an associated boarding establishment.

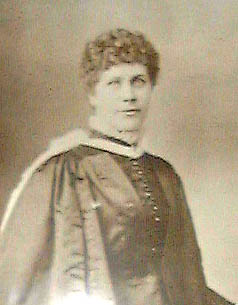
Caroline Freeman in graduate robes

In 1897, Freeman opened a second Girton College in Latimer Square, Christchurch, also with 60 pupils. The Christchurch school was a large building with a stage, with imported casts for models for drawing classes, a 2,000 volume library and Yagg's anatomical studies of the human body. The schools were popular with parents. They gave moral guidance and were excellent finishing schools. They also prepared some of the pupils for tertiary study, after which they would go on to be secondary school teachers.

Freeman was active in the wider intellectual community of the region - in 1899, the Gore Young Men's Temperance Society organised a lecture series at which Freeman delivered a lecture on "The Cry of the Children".

At Otago Girls' High School, Freeman had taught Helene Fodor. Later, Helene's mother, Georgina, was one of those who helped finance the establishment of Girton College. At Girton, Helene taught French, drawing and painting. On Georgina's death in 1900, Helene inherited the loan. In 1906, Helene married Christchurch wine merchant Charles Cross. The marriage failed and Helene returned to Girton as a teacher and Freeman's companion.

A foundation pupil at Girton College, Frances Ross, returned as first assistant in 1891 and later bought the establishment from Freeman. In 1915, Ross merged the Dunedin Girton College with Braemar House and became the first headmistress of the modern Columba College.

In 1911, Freeman and Fodor settled at Girton College, Christchurch. In 1912, they put the school in the capable hands of Mabel Brown and left for England in the hope that Freeman might recover her health. They returned with the health issues unresolved.

Caroline Freeman sought to resume control of the Christchurch school and Mabel Brown left, taking a number of the girls with her. On 27 May 1914, Fodor obtained a divorce. Fodor confirmed that, 'from having seen her die', Freeman had succumbed to a heart attack on or about 16 August 1914.

A former student noted that Caroline Freeman had

... a straight sincere half humorous, half tender glance .... We had not intended to do anything more than ... slip through our lessons with as ... little application as could be practiced without punishment. But ... the look from the keen frank blue eyes of our new mistress ... put us on our mettle .... She made us believe that we wanted to work, that knowledge was the finest power on earth ... that to become well-behaved, cultured, kindly women was our one ambition in life ... She led us to follow her breathlessly through a world of new things .... History was an interesting story; literature ... laughter and tears combined; arithmetic had a reason for its existence; geography was a journey over the delightful parts of the world. As to English, our own language of our forefathers, she spurred our enthusiasm and our loyalty as she proudly pointed out its origin and told us its romantic story ....

On her gravestone, at Linwood Cemetery, Christchurch, Freeman is recalled as 'the beloved teacher and guide of many of New Zealand's girls'. Freeman's estate was valued at under 1700 pounds. Helene Fodor, her trustee and sole beneficiary, later, became Mrs. G. D. Greenwood.

== Legacy ==
Present-day Columba College features a theatre aptly named after Freeman, the Caroline Freeman Theatre.

In 2009, Freeman's great-great-great-niece also graduated from the University of Otago - Claire Steel.

In 2017, the University of Otago residential college City College was renamed Caroline Freeman College in her honour, and she was chosen as one of the Royal Society of New Zealand's "150 women in 150 words".
