= David Homel =

American-Canadian writer and literary translator

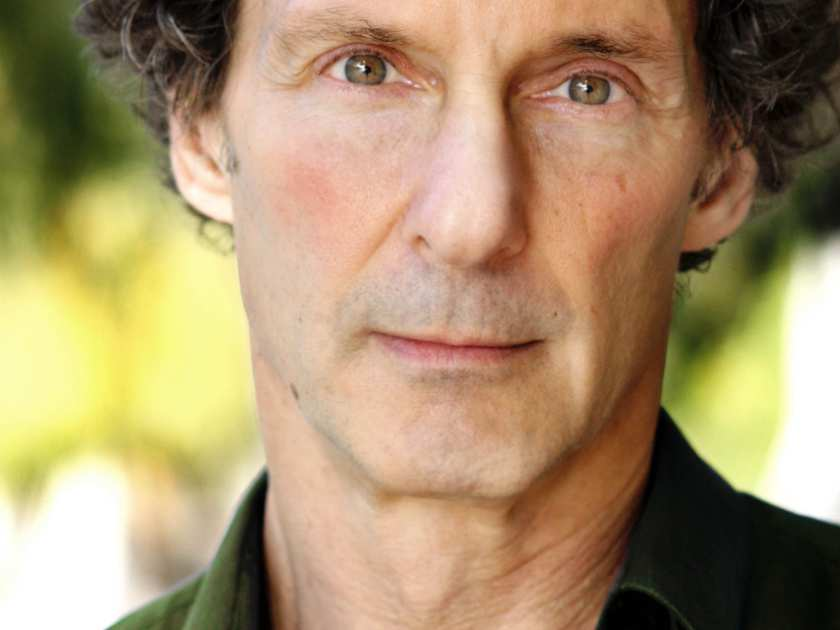
- Born: 1952 (age 73–74); Chicago, Illinois, U.S.
- Occupations: Writer, translator
- Spouse: Marie-Louise Gay
- Writing career
- Language: English, French
- Period: 1980s-present
- Genres: Fiction, memoir

David Homel (born 1952) is an American-Canadian writer and literary translator. He is most noted as a two-time winner of the Governor General's Award for French to English translation, winning the award at the 1995 Governor General's Awards for Why Must a Black Writer Write About Sex?, his translation of Dany Laferrière's Cette grenade dans la main du jeune nègre est-elle une arme ou un fruit?, and alongside Fred A. Reed at the 2001 Governor General's Awards for Fairy Ring, their translation of Martine Desjardins' Le Cercle de Clara.

Originally from Chicago, Illinois, Homel moved to Canada in 1975, first taking a master's at the University of Toronto before settling in Montreal in 1980. He is married to children's writer Marie-Louise Gay, with whom he has cowritten several children's works.

His debut novel Electrical Storms, published in 1988, was shortlisted for the SmithBooks/Books in Canada First Novel Award in 1989. He is also a two-time winner of the Paragraphe Hugh MacLennan Prize for Fiction at the Quebec Writers' Federation Awards, winning in 2003 for The Speaking Cure and in 2019 for The Teardown.

He has been nominated for the Governor General's Award for translation on eight other occasions, for his translations of Laferrière's How to Make Love to a Negro Without Getting Tired (Comment faire l'amour avec un nègre sans se fatiguer) in 1988, An Aroma of Coffee (L'Odeur du café) in 1994 and A Drifting Year (Chronique de la dérive douce) in 1997, Yves Beauchemin's The Second Fiddle (Le Second violon) in 1998, Philippe Poloni's Olivo Oliva in 1999, Monique Proulx's The Heart Is an Involuntary Muscle (Le Cœur est un muscle involontaire) in 2003 and Wildlives (Champagne) in 2009, and Desjardins' All That Glitters (L'Élu du hasard) in 2005.

== Works ==
=== Fiction ===
- Electrical Storms - 1988
- Rat Palms - 1992
- Sonya & Jack - 1995
- Get on Top - 1999
- The Speaking Cure - 2003
- Midway - 2010
- The Fledglings - 2014
- The Teardown - 2019
- A House Without Spirits - 2022

=== Children's, with Marie-Louise Gay ===
- Travels With My Family - 2006
- On the Road Again! - 2008
- Summer in the City - 2012
- The Traveling Circus - 2015
- Travels in Cuba - 2021

=== Non-fiction ===
- Mapping Literature: The Art and Politics of Literary Translation - 1988
- Le monde est un document, with photos by John Max - 2002
- Lunging Into the Underbrush: A Life Lived Backwards - 2021

=== Translation ===
- Talking It Out: The October Crisis from Inside - 1987 (Francis Simard, Pour en finir avec Octobre)
- How to Make Love to a Negro - 1988 (Dany Laferrière, Comment faire l'amour avec un nègre sans se fatiguer)
- The Invisible Empire - 1990 (Denis Côté, L'invisible puissance)
- An Aroma of Coffee - 1993 (Dany Laferrière, L'odeur du café)
- Why Must a Black Writer Write About Sex - 1995 (Dany Laferrière, Cette grenade dans la main du jeune nègre est-elle une arme ou un fruit?)
- Sandman Blues - 1996 (Stéphane Bourguignon, L'avaleur de sable)
- A Drifting Year - 1997 (Dany Laferrière, Chronique de la dérive douce)
- The Second Fiddle - 1998 (Yves Beauchemin, Le second violon)
- Olivo Oliva - 1999 (Philippe Poloni)
- Fairy Rings - 2001 (Martine Desjardins, Le cercle de Clara), with Fred A. Reed
- The Heart Is an Involuntary Muscle - 2003 (Monique Proulx,Le cœur est un muscle involontaire), with Fred A. Reed
- All That Glitters - 2005 (Martine Desjardins, L'élu du hasard), with Fred A. Reed
- The Baldwins - 2006 (Serge Lamothe, Les Baldwin), with Fred A. Reed
