= Take One (Canadian magazine) =

Canadian magazine

- Categories: Film
- Founder: Peter Lebensold; Adam Symansky; John Roston
- First issue: 1966; 60 years ago
- Country: Canada
- ISSN: 0039-9132
- OCLC: 40366931

Take One (published Montreal, 1966–1979) (ISSN 0039-9132, OCLC 40366931) was a Canadian magazine devoted to coverage of both Canadian and international film.

Founded by three "graduates" of the McGill Film Society—Peter Lebensold, Adam Symansky and John Roston—Take One was the first serious English-Canadian film magazine. This—first of the two Canadian film magazines entitled Take One—gave due attention to the newly emerging Canadian film scene, but was international in scope.

== Description ==
It was inexpensive (initially 25 cents a copy), and aimed to publish bi-monthly—a goal which it rarely achieved. The magazine attracted some of the best film journalists of the time (including Time magazine reviewer Jay Cocks, James Monaco [author of the standard textbook, How to Read a Film], Alanna Nash, and the Montreal cartoonists Terry Mosher and Vittorio Fiorucci)—and often filmmakers themselves (including Brian DePalma and Richard Dreyfuss, who met Lebensold while he was filming The Apprenticeship of Duddy Kravitz in and around Montreal).

Symansky and Roston having left after an issue or two, Lebensold carried on alone as editor and publisher. Joe Medjuck (later to become a producer in Hollywood working with Ivan Reitman) was another McGill Film Society alumnus who became involved with the magazine—initially as a Toronto "correspondent", and then as co-editor/publisher. For most of its life under Lebensold's editorship, the magazine was designed by Montreal graphic artist Gerry l'Orange. A number of covers were illustrated by Harry Agensky, who also designed most of the Film Society's brochures and literature in the late 60's. This, first, Take One continued briefly to publish after the departure (about 1977) of founder Peter Lebensold, under the editorship of Phyllis Platt (later a vice-president of the Canadian Broadcasting Corporation and television-program producer) but folded shortly afterwards, in 1979, after 81 issues.

Reflecting the magazine's broad cinematic scope, notable issues of this Take One included a special on Alfred Hitchcock (with contributions from photographer Philippe Halsman, director Peter Bogdanovich, actress Ingrid Bergman and many others) ... and issues that featured long cover essays by Alanna Nash on filmmaker D.W. Griffith (1974) and actress Jean Muir (1977.)

== Take One: Film & Television in Canada ==
Published subsequently (in Toronto, and with no connection to the above), Take One: Film & Television in Canada (1992–2006; ISSN 1192-5507, OCLC 60624126) is a former magazine which was published in Canada. Although it shares the name with the original Take One, Take One: Film and Television in Canada was a separate publication with no connection to its predecessor.

=== Description ===
Unlike the original, its focus was entirely Canadian. When its founder, Wyndham Wise – a student of Joe Medjuck when Medjuck taught film studies at Innis College, University of Toronto in the early 1970s – launched the magazine in the fall of 1992, he called Joe in Los Angeles to ask permission to use the name. Medjuck gave permission, but said it would ‘confuse librarians.’ He was right.

With no government or institutional support, at first Take One: Film and Television in Canada was published irregularly. When it did eventually receive support from the Ontario Arts Council and Canada Council, it went quarterly in 1996 and for a brief period in the early 2000s it was published five times a year. It folded in the spring of 2006 after 52 issues and three special issues.

The magazine was published by a non-profit organization, the Canadian Independent Film & Television Publishing Association, and Wyndham Wise served as the publisher and editor-in-chief. Over the span of its publishing history, contributing editors included Marc Glassman, Tom McSorley, Maurie Alioff and Cynthia Amsden. It built a reputation as Canada’s finest and most influential film magazine, offering criticism, articles, reviews and interviews and, most notably, significant contributions to the discourse on Canada cinema.

Issue No. 12, Summer 1996 was devoted to 100 Years of Canadian Cinema and included a major essay by Geoff Pevere: “Ghostbusting: 100 Years of Canadian Cinema or Why My Canada Includes The Terminator”; No. 22, Winter 1998 included Wyndham Wise’s essay “Canadian Cinema from Boom to Bust: The Tax-Shelter Years”; and issue No. 28, Summer 2000 contained Cameron Bailey’s “A Secret History of the Toronto New Wave.” In 2001 (which coined the phrase the Toronto New Wave), the University of Toronto Press published Take One’s Essential Guide to Canadian Film, the most comprehensive book of its kind since Peter Morris’s The Film Companion (1984). In 2006, the magazine ceased publication and the Take One digital archives were transferred to Northern Stars.

== See also ==
- Canadian cinema
