= Kakanui =

Town in Otago Region, New Zealand

Coordinates: 45°11′S 170°54′E

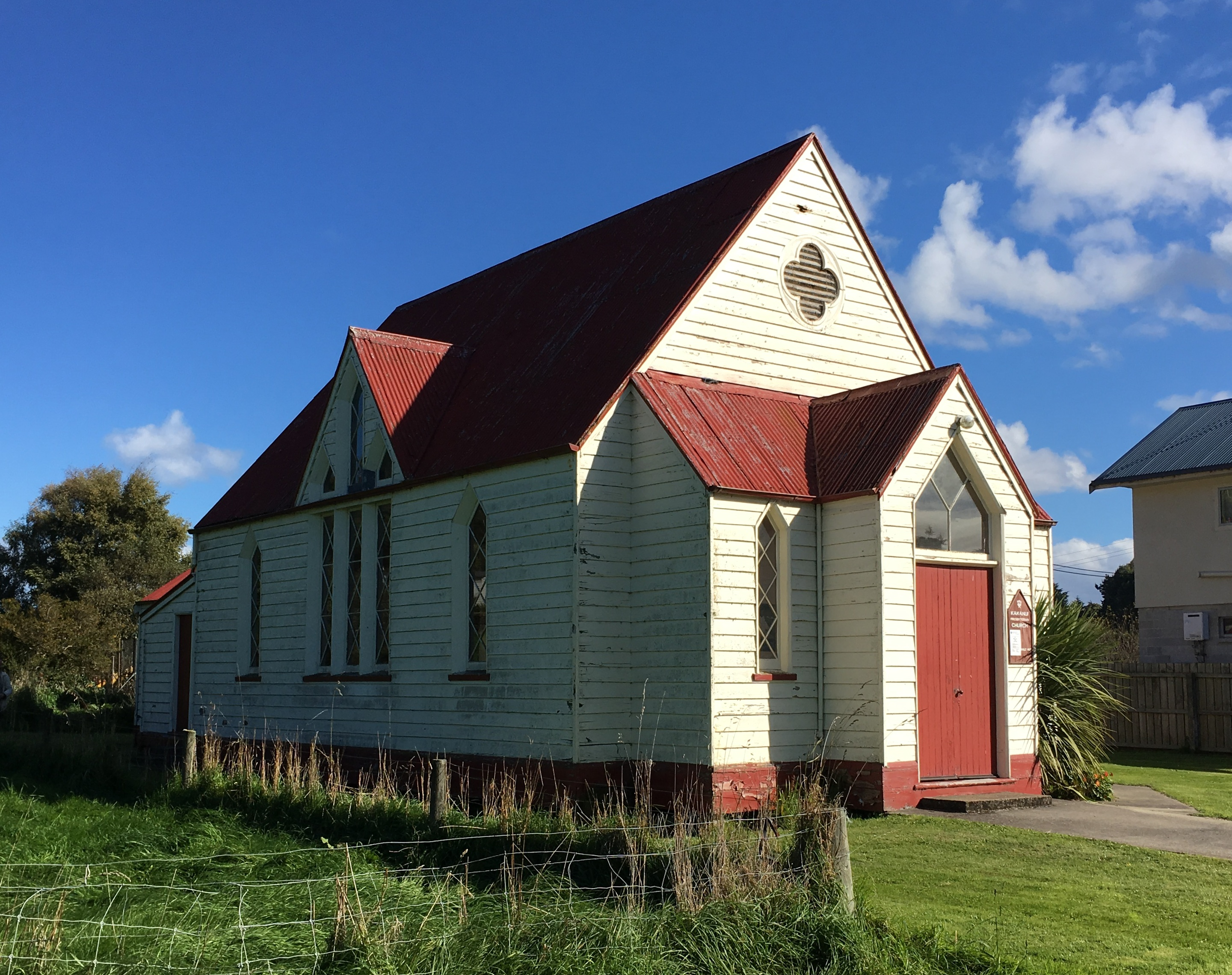
Kakanui Presbyterian Church was listed as a Category I heritage building in 2025

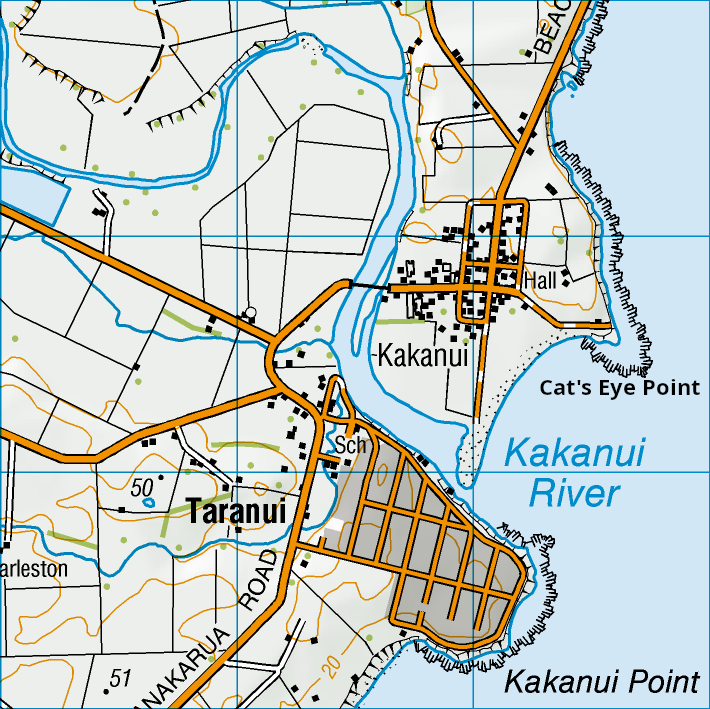
Topographic map of Kakanui

Kakanui is a coastal town in Otago, New Zealand, located approximately 14 km (8.7 mi) south of Oamaru. The Kakanui River divides the settlement in two. Kakanui was home to a small Maori population prior to European settlement. Prior to establishment of the township the area was used as run-hold land. The discovery of breccia up the river led to the creation of a harbour and port and a meat works was established in Kakanui, leading to a prosperous decade with a five-fold growth in the population. Competition with the port at Oamaru and the railway line avoiding Kakanui led to a decline in the port and it was eventually dismantled. Despite the loss of the port the town remained and in the 20th century it became a holiday destination.

== Etymology ==
According to Ngai Tahu the name is a corruption of Kākaunui.

== Geography ==
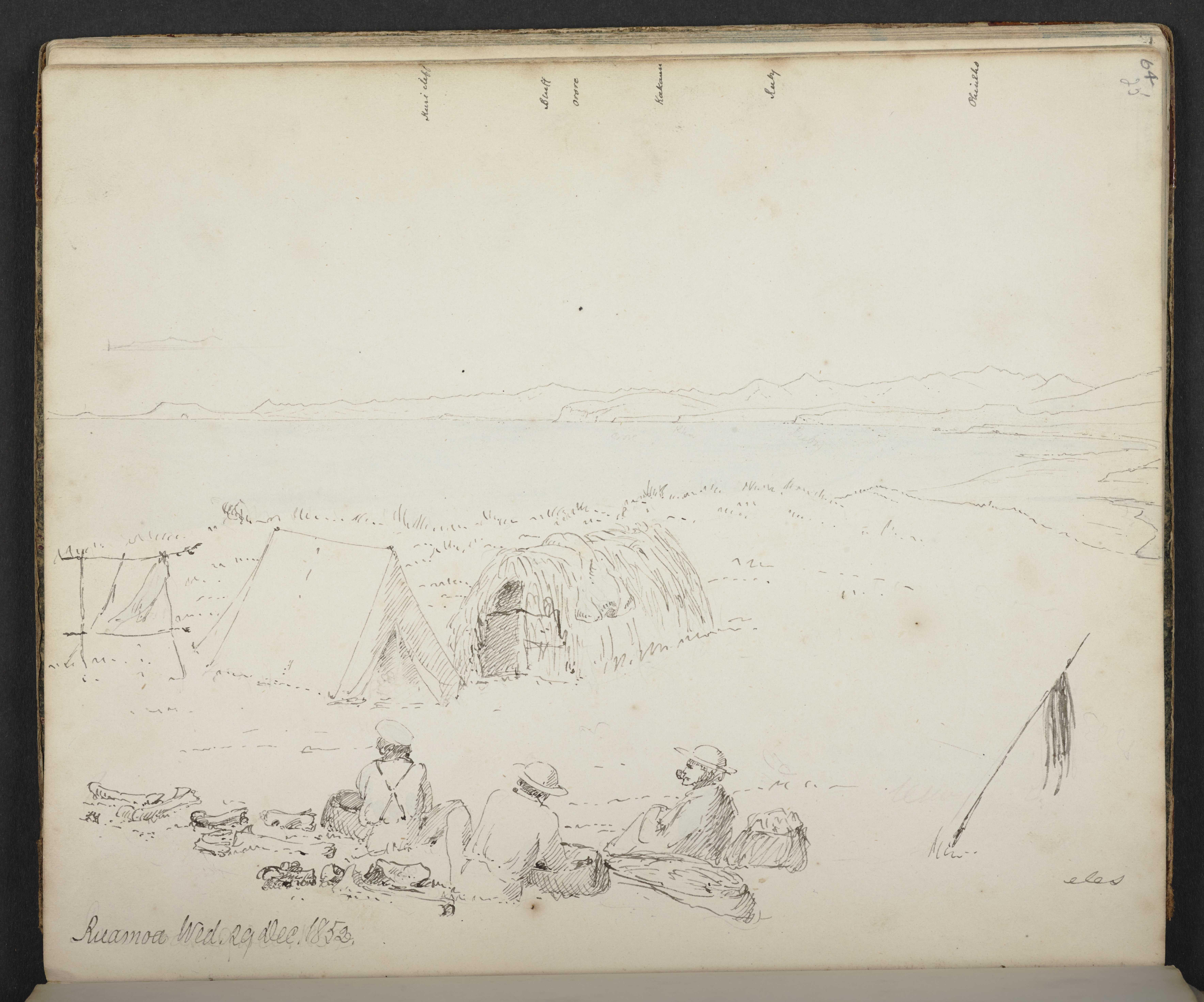
Walter Mantell's drawing of Ruamoa, to the south of Kakanui

Kakanui is split into two halves by the Kakanui River. Kakanui is located approximately 14 km (8.7 mi) south of Oamaru. The soil around Kakanui is fertile and supports the growing of several crops. Kakanui is part of the Otepopo district, which includes Herbert, Maheno, and Hampden.

== History ==
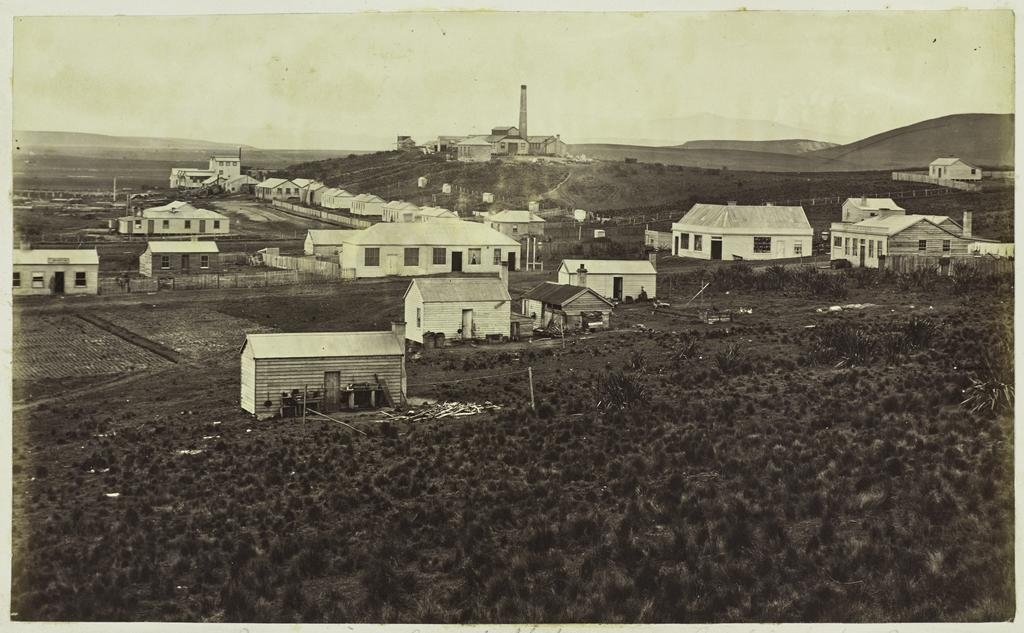
The New Zealand Meat Preserving Company works in Kakanui, 1870s

Kakanui was purchased as part of the Canterbury block. Walter Mantell visited Kakanui on 7 November 1848 (Note: Walter Mantell's role at the time was to set aside native reserves in the Canterbury block) and recorded 12 Maori living at Cats Eye Point. (Note: Cats Eye Point is in the northern half of Kakanui.) Mantell recorded 75 acres (30 ha) of land to be set aside as a native reserve, but in 1853 the Crown disestablished the reserve and extended the Moeraki reserve by 75 acres in exchange.

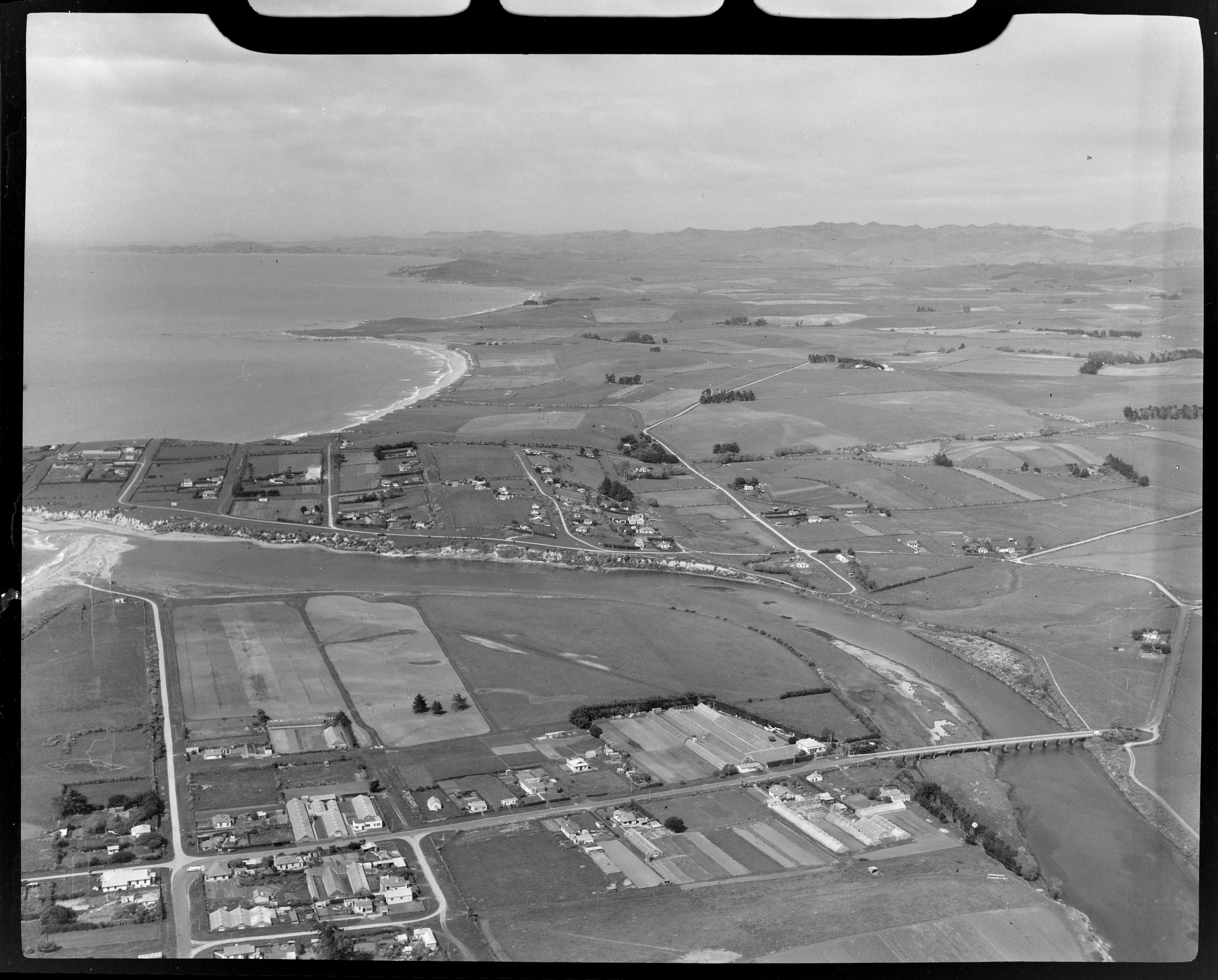
Aerial photograph of Kakanui, November 1947

The first settler in the area was Charles Eberhard Suisted. Suisted had a run (Note: In New Zealand English a run is land used for the grazing of livestock) that extended from the Waianakarua River to the Awamoa River. In 1861 Suisted's land was surveyed and subdivided into hundreds. (Note: The division of land into hundreds was a way of disposing excess Crown Land by the provincial government)

In 1866 breccia was discovered near the Waiareka outlet and Gees Point and the following year the creation of a harbour at Kakanui to transport the stone was investigated. In 1868 a harbour wall and jetties were created at the mouth of the Kakanui River. A port was constructed in 1870 and the New Zealand Meat Preserving Company was established the following year. The meat works helped to significantly grow the town, employing between 60 and 70 workers by 1872. The port was busy, with meat being exported to Britain. Kakanui became prosperous thanks to the port and a flax mill was established on the banks of the Kakanui River at Māori Ford and supplied Dunedin. The population of Kakanui had increased five-fold from the opening of the port to 1881, with the meat works being the main employer in the town. This prosperity was short-lived with the establishment of a railway line from Oamaru to Dunedin and expansion of the Oamaru port reducing the amount of goods that went through Kakanui. In 1884 the harbour walls and jetties were demolished and two years later a storm wrecked the harbour. The meat works closed in 1891.

Brown coal, along with gold and limestone, was mined in the nearby Kakanui Mountains. In 1869 a Crown Grant (Note: A Crown Grant is the transfer of Crown land to private title. Crown Grants could be part of a contract, a reward for service, or just purchased from the Crown.) was granted and the following year John Bathgate laid out the township. (Note: In New Zealand English a township is a site reserved and laid out as a town, even if the settlement does not currently meet the criteria or definition of town) One of the first to purchase sites in the township was Captain James Matheson. Most of the settlement growth was on the northern half. A bridge connecting the north and south parts of Kakanui was constructed in 1871 and an influx of settlers to southern Kakanui commenced in 1874. A limework kiln that operated from c.1890 to the early 20th-century is registered as an archaeological site. After James Ingram McDonald died in 1935 his limeworks moved operation to Kakanui and continued there until 1964, when it amalgamated with the Milburn Lime Company.

In 1905 Kakanui had a post office, a Presbyterian church, hotel, school, meatworks, and fellmongery. In the 1920s holiday homes started to crop up and Kakanui continues to be a popular holiday retreat.

=== Kakanui Presbyterian Church ===
The first Presbyterian service was held in 1858. In 1869 a public meeting was held and the decision was made to build a local church. Previously residents had to travel to Otepopo for services. A section south of the river was chosen and purchased for £15 (Note: $2,038 today). Robert Arthur Lawson, a prominent architect of Presbyterian churches in the South Island, was hired for £20 (Note: $2,717 today) and designed a Gothic timber building. The tender was £353 (Note: $49,525 today). The Kakanui Presbyterian Church formally opened 20 March 1870. A Sunday school was built on the site in 1933. The belfry was removed in 1959. The decline in religiosity impacted the small church, with irregular services by 2010. The church held the last service 10 November 2019. It was sold to private owners who began restoration work on the church. (Note: As of 2026 the restoration is still on-going. The building continues to be used despite the works.) The church is still used for weddings and other community events. In July 2025 it was registered as a category 1 historic building with Heritage New Zealand.

== Demographics ==
Kakanui has 24% of its residents working in agriculture and fisheries compared to 43% in neighbouring Maheno, with a large proportion of retirees and holiday homes.

Kakanui had 100 residents in 1870, 11 years later this had grown to 500.

Kakanui is described as a rural settlement by Statistics New Zealand, and covers 2.02 km^{2} (0.78 sq mi). It had an estimated population of 440 as of June 2025, with a population density of 218 people per km^{2}. It is part of the larger Maheno statistical area.

Historical population
Year	Pop.	±% p.a.
2006	375	—
2013	342	−1.31%
2018	402	+3.29%
2023	423	+1.02%

Kakanui had a population of 423 in the 2023 New Zealand census, an increase of 21 people (5.2%) since the 2018 census, and an increase of 81 people (23.7%) since the 2013 census. There were 216 males and 207 females in 201 dwellings. 1.4% of people identified as LGBTIQ+. The median age was 54.4 years (compared with 38.1 years nationally). There were 57 people (13.5%) aged under 15 years, 39 (9.2%) aged 15 to 29, 207 (48.9%) aged 30 to 64, and 120 (28.4%) aged 65 or older.

People could identify as more than one ethnicity. The results were 92.9% European (Pākehā), 5.7% Māori, 2.1% Pasifika, 5.7% Asian, and 5.0% other, which includes people giving their ethnicity as "New Zealander". English was spoken by 99.3%, Māori by 0.7%, and other languages by 7.1%. The percentage of people born overseas was 17.0, compared with 28.8% nationally.

Religious affiliations were 28.4% Christian, 1.4% New Age, and 0.7% other religions. People who answered that they had no religion were 62.4%, and 6.4% of people did not answer the census question.

Of those at least 15 years old, 90 (24.6%) people had a bachelor's or higher degree, 195 (53.3%) had a post-high school certificate or diploma, and 75 (20.5%) people exclusively held high school qualifications. The median income was $34,000, compared with $41,500 nationally. 27 people (7.4%) earned over $100,000 compared to 12.1% nationally. The employment status of those at least 15 was 159 (43.4%) full-time, 60 (16.4%) part-time, and 6 (1.6%) unemployed.
