= Grace Mackintosh =

Headmistress and college lecturer (1890–1954)

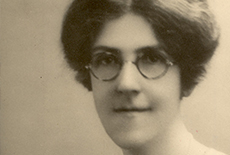

2nd Principal of Columba College
- In office 1930–1933
- Preceded by: Frances Ross
- Succeeded by: Clarice Ashworth

4th Principal of Pymble Ladies' College
- In office 1933–1936
- Preceded by: Nancy Jobson
- Succeeded by: Dorothy Knox

Personal details
- Born: 5 September 1890 Aberdeen, Scotland
- Died: 23 March 1954 (aged 63) Aberdeen, Scotland
- Parent(s): Grace and John Mackintosh
- Education: University of Aberdeen; University of Cambridge
- Occupation: Teacher; headmistress

Grace Mackintosh (5 September 1890 – 23 March 1954) was a Scottish-born school teacher and principal. Originally from Aberdeen, she became a headmistress in leading schools in New Zealand and Australia, but then returned to being a teacher. She was later a teachers' college lecturer in English literature.

== Life ==
Mackintosh was born in Aberdeen in 1890. Her parents were Grace Smith (née Knight) and the historian and writer John Mackintosh. Her father wrote the four volume The History of Civilisation in Scotland. She gained a second-class degree in English language and literature from her local university before she qualified as a teacher at the University of Cambridge in 1915. Her first teaching posts were at the Inverness Royal Academy and the Central School, Aberdeen (later Aberdeen Academy).

Mackintosh became principal at Columba College in Dunedin, New Zealand, taking over from the founding head Frances Ross in 1930. Mackintosh was not successful. She suffered with the cold weather, her arthritis and some routine decisions. She is credited with introducing the school's house system which is still in use.

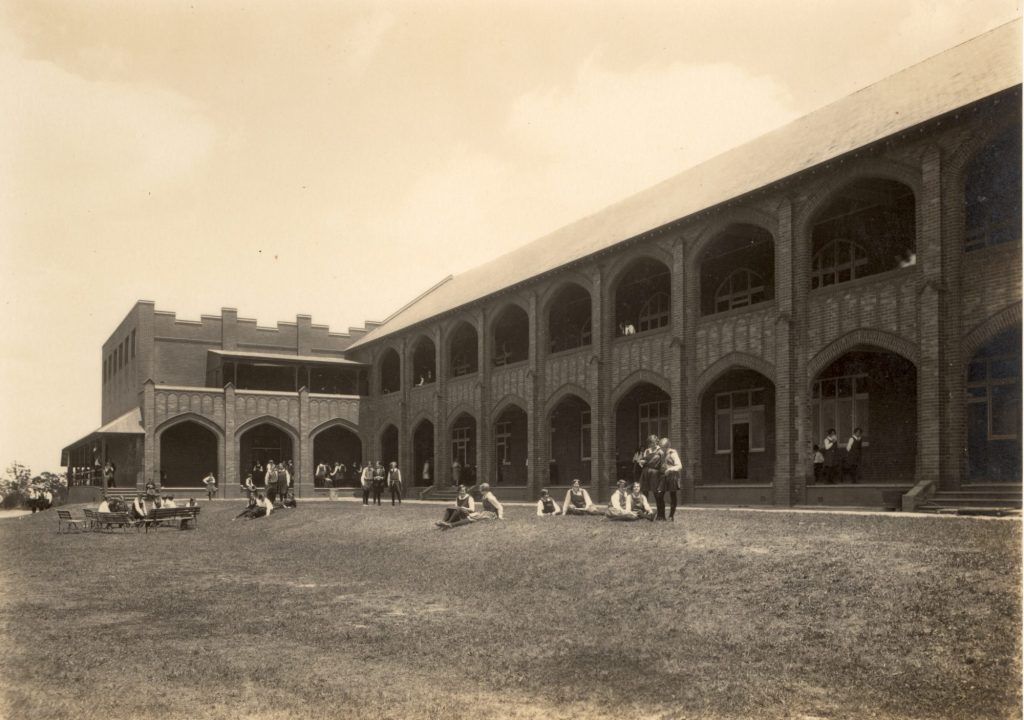
Pymble College in the 1920s

Meanwhile, Nancy Jobson was principal of Pymble Ladies' College, but she left following a disagreement. In 1933 Mackintosh was her replacement but she failed to impress despite her academic qualifications. Younger students found her Scottish accent difficult, and as the Great Depression deepened the number of students began to fall further. Mackintosh decided to introduce new ideas including those about Presbyterianism. She introduced a new prayer that she had constructed based on Greek and biblical sources to show the link between religion and education. However, she failed to bond with the staff or the pupils, and she had lost her own faith in the church by 1936. She decided to resign, and in July 1936 Dorothy Knox became her replacement.

Mackintosh went back to Scotland, before later returning to Australia to work as a secondary school teacher in Sydney. In 1943, she was moved temporarily from North Sydney Girls' High School to become an English literature lecturer at Sydney Teachers' College. She stopped lecturing in 1953 while still on a temporary appointment and returned again to Scotland. Mackintosh lived there with her brother, John, and she died of cancer in Aberdeen the following year.
