= Shannon Harper =

American novelist

- Occupation: Novelist
- Writing career
- Pen name: Elizabeth Habersham, Anna James, Madeline Harper (Madeline Porter); Leigh Bristol, Taylor Brady (Donna Ball)
- Period: 1977–1997
- Genre: Romance

Shannon Harper is a popular United States co-writer of romantic novels. During years she collaborated with Madeline Porter by mail, fax machines and their computers, using pen names Elizabeth Habersham, Anna James and Madeline Harper. She also co-wrote books with Donna Ball as Leigh Bristol and Taylor Brady. She lives in Winter Haven, Florida, US.
