= Columba College =

School in Dunedin, New Zealand

Location
- 399 Highgate, Dunedin; 45.863125°S 170.494375°E

Information
- Type: State-integrated, Day & Boarding (secondary)
- Motto: Latin: Gratia et Disciplina Bona (With Grace and Good Discipline)
- Established: 1915; 111 years ago
- Ministry of Education Institution no.: 386
- Principal: Aaron Everett (acting principal; 2025–present)
- Years offered: 1–13
- Gender: co-education primary (Year 1–6); single sex girls secondary (Year 7–13)
- Enrolment: 608 (July 2026)
- Socio-economic decile: 10Z
- Website: columbacollege.school.nz

Columba College is an integrated Presbyterian school in Roslyn, Dunedin, New Zealand. The roll is made up of pupils of all ages. The majority of pupils are in the girls' secondary, day and boarding school, but there is also a primary school for boys and girls in years 1–6.

== History ==
=== Origins ===
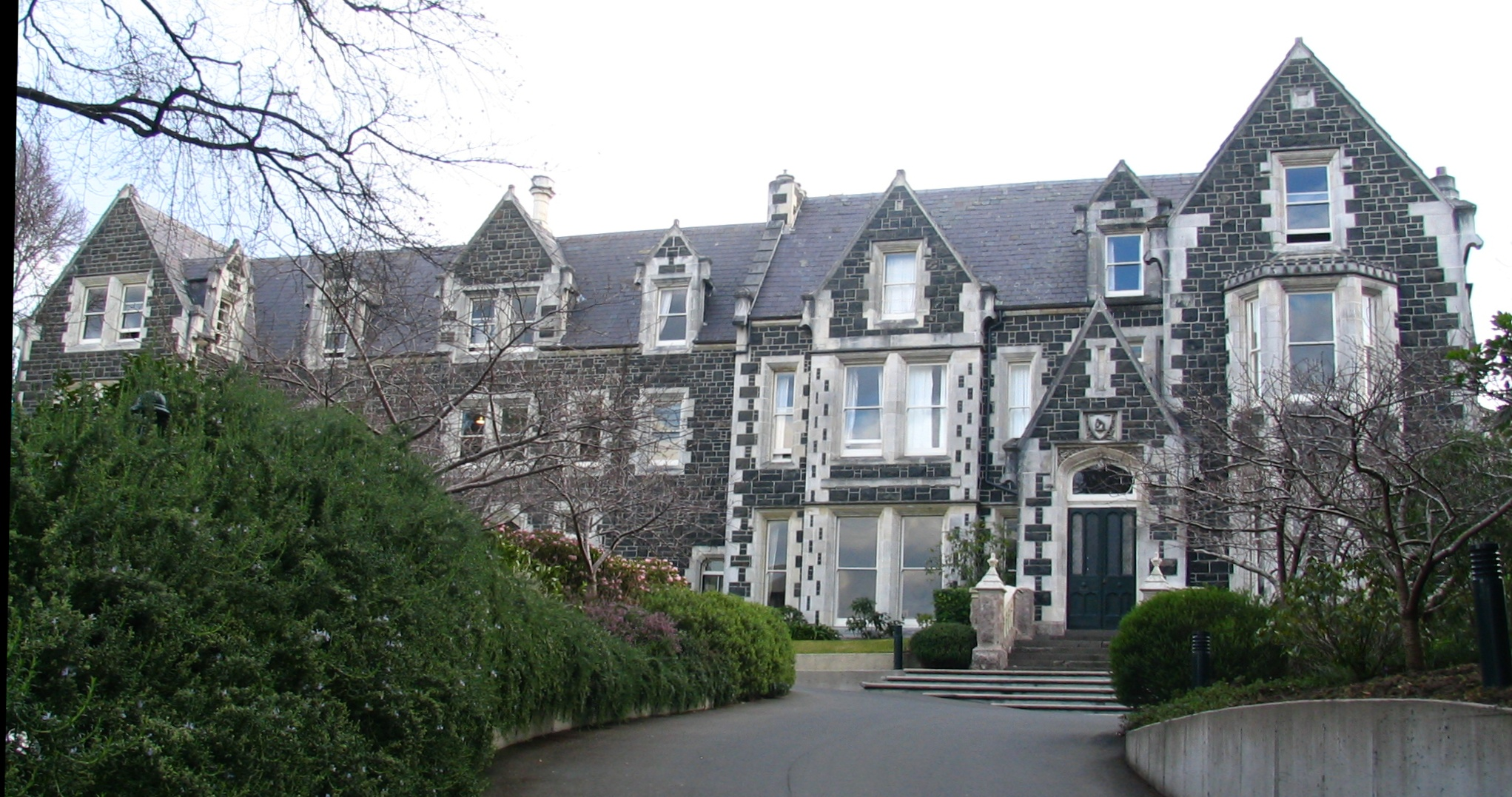
Bishopscourt building, a Category I Historic Place

Columba College was established in 1915 by the Presbyterian Church of New Zealand as a private day and boarding school for girls with co-educational primary classes. The Rev'd Alexander Whyte was a key figure in the foundation of Columba College, through his vision for a Presbyterian girls' school.

Columba College was created from two earlier Dunedin girls' schools, Girton College and Braemar House. Girton College had been founded in 1886 by the first woman graduate of the University of Otago, Caroline Freeman, who sold it to Frances Ross in 1891. Ross then purchased Braemar House and combined it with Girton College.

Frances Ross was appointed by the Presbytery of Dunedin as the first Head Mistress of the newly created Columba College in 1914. The schools moved to the current site at Bishopscourt, purchased from the first Anglican bishop for Otago and Southland, Bishop Nevill. The large house there had been designed by William Mason and built in 1872.

Whereas most church schools took a conservative view of girls' education, Columba built on the traditions of Girton College. High educational standards were set, while due attention was given to music, physical training, domestic science and, of course, religious instruction. The differing abilities and aspirations of the pupils were acknowledged and fostered. Ross expected a great deal from her girls and was not disappointed. Columba girls took prizes, scholarships and degrees at university and made their mark in a range of occupations.

Grace Mackintosh was a Scottish-born teacher who became the principal in 1930. She appeared to be religious. She had difficulty in coping with the climate and the job. She suffered with arthritis and making routine decisions. She left after three years when she was appointed at the head of Presbyterian Ladies' College, Pymble.

=== Contemporary history ===
Columba College was integrated as a composite school under the terms of the Private Schools' Integration Act effective 31 January 1994.

In 2023, Charissa Nicol became the Principal of Columba College. In July 2025, Nicol went on leave for unspecified reasons. In mid-October 2025, the Otago Daily Times reported that alleged internal infighting among staff members had led the school's board of trustees to seek help from specialist governance adviser Cleave Hay and the Ministry of Education in developing a "strategic plan" and engagement workshops with teaching staff. On 22 October, Columba's governing board confirmed that Nicol had resigned as principal, with deputy principal Aaron Everett continuing as the school's acting principal.

In early November 2025, Columba teachers affiliated with the Post Primary Teachers' Association (PPTA) called for the chairs of both the boards of trustees and governors to resign, citing a lack of confidence in their leadership and governance of the school. The PPTA also called for the installation of a temporary statutory manager. In late March 2026, Radio New Zealand reported that Columba teachers had complained to the Education Ministry about the board of governors' alleged bullying and interference in the school's operations. In response, the board of governors denied the allegations and accused the Ministry of lacking impartiality and interference.

On 31 March 2026, the global education consultancy ranked Columba College among the top 20 schools in New Zealand on university preparation. It was one of two South Island high schools and the only Dunedin high school to reach that ranking for 2026.

In late June 2026, Auckland teacher Chay Carter was designated by Columba's boards of governors and trustees as Principal, effective 27 October 2026.

== Boarding facilities ==
Attached to the school are boarding facilities, catering for approximately 110 students, both domestic and international from years 9 to 13. Students live in one of two on-campus buildings, Katharine Buchan House or Bishopscourt.

== Enrolment ==
As a state-integrated school, Columba College charges compulsory attendance dues plus requests voluntary donations. For the 2025 school year, the attendance dues payable is $2,034 per year while the requested donation is $2,160 per year.

As of July 2026, the school has a roll of 608 students, of which 51 (8.4%) identify as Māori.

As of 2026, the school has an Equity Index of 391, placing it amongst schools whose students have fewest socioeconomic barriers to achievement (roughly equivalent to deciles 9 and 10 under the former socio-economic decile system).

== Notable alumnae ==
- Frances Hodgkins – artist,
- Cilla McQueen – poet
- Nancy Steen - rosarian and artist
- Greta Stevenson – botanist

== Notable staff ==
- Irene McInnes - New Zealand netball administrator
- Frances Ross – New Zealand school principal

== See also ==
- List of schools in New Zealand
