= Kakanui River =

Coordinates: 45°12′S 170°54′E

Location
- Country: New Zealand

The Kakanui River is a river of North Otago, New Zealand, bridged by Highway 1 at Maheno and flowing into the Pacific Ocean at Kakanui.

== History ==
In 1866 breccia was discovered near the Waiareka outlet and Gees Point and the following year the creation of a harbour at Kakanui to transport the stone was investigated. In 1868 a harbour wall and jetties were created at the mouth of the river. A port was constructed in 1870 and the New Zealand Meat Preserving Company was established that same year. In 1884 the harbour walls and jetties were demolished and two years later a storm wrecked the harbour.

== See also ==
- List of rivers of New Zealand
