= Vittorio Fiorucci =

Italian Canadian poster artist

Vittorio Fiorucci (1932 – July 30, 2008) was an Italian Canadian poster artist from Montreal, Quebec, Canada.

Fiorucci was born on 2 November 1932, in Zara, Italy (now modern-day Zadar, Croatia). During World War Two when Zara was about to be captured by Yugoslavia, Fiorucci and his family fled to Venice, Italy, where he subsequently spent most of his childhood before coming to Canada in 1951. By 1960, he was an established artist and by 1980 was one of the most renowned poster designers in the world. Fiorucci was awarded a Moebius Award at the 1998 International Advertising Awards of Chicago, and lifetime achievement awards from the Canadian Association of Photographers and Illustrators and the Institute of Design Montréal. Fiorucci worked in a variety of mediums: he did illustration works for magazines (including the film magazine Take One), children's books, animation, and was an established photographer who was exhibited in 1958 at George Eastman House's International Exhibition of the World's Greatest Photographers.

His work was used to promote many of the films that marked the beginning of independent Québécois cinema, and appeared in magazines as varied as Time and (the cinema magazine) Take One. He created the logo for the Le Château chain of clothing stores, and the green mascot Victor of the Just For Laughs festival. He died from a stroke on July 30, 2008, and was entombed at the Notre Dame des Neiges Cemetery in Montreal.
