= Annie Isabella James =

New Zealand Presbyterian missionary (1864–1965)

Annie Isabella James (22 April 1884–6 February 1965) was a New Zealand Presbyterian medical missionary who served in China. She was born in Otepopo, North Otago, New Zealand on 22 April 1884.
