= Madeline Harper =

American novelist

Madeline Porter and Shannon Harper
- Occupation: Novelist
- Writing career
- Pen name: Elizabeth Habersham; Anna James; Madeline Harper
- Period: 1977–1997
- Genre: Romantic novel

Madeline Harper may be the best-known joint pen name of the American writing team Madeline Porter and Shannon Harper. They wrote together from 1977, when their first book, a Gothic romance, was published as by Elizabeth Habersham, to 1997. They also wrote together under the name Anna James.

== Biography ==
Madeline Porter lives in Newport Beach, California, where she is assistant publicity director for the award-winning South Coast Repertory Theater. Shannon Harper lives in Winter Haven, Florida. During their partnership, Madeline and Shannon have lived on opposite coasts of U.S., and they collaborated via the mail, fax machines and their computers.

== Awards ==
=== As Anna James ===
- The Day Beyond Destiny: 1982 Rita Awards Golden Medallion for Mainstream Historical Romance

== Books written by Porter and Harper ==
=== As Elizabeth Habersham ===
- Island of Deceit (1977)

=== As Anna James ===
- The Darker Side of Love (1979)
- Sweet Love, Bitter Love (1981)
- The Day Beyond Destiny (1981)
- A World Of Her Own (1982)
- Edge of Love (1983)
- Love On the Line (1984)
- The Venetian Necklace (1985)
- Nina's Song (1985)
- Images (1986)
- The Reluctant Swan (1986)
- Their Song Unending (1987)
- Dreammakers (1987)
- Passage to Zaphir (1987)
- Stairway to the Moon (1988)
- The Treasures of Kavos (1989)

=== As Madeline Harper ===
- Lovedance (1984)
- Every Intimate Detail (1985)
- After the Rain (1986)
- The Ultimate Seduction (1987)
- Keepsakes (1988)
- This Time Forever (1989)
- The Jade Affair (1990)
- Dangerous Charade (1992)
- The Sundowner (1993)
- Wedding Bell Blues (1993)
- The Pirate's Woman (1994)
- Christmas in July (1994)
- The Trouble with Babies (1995)
- Stranger in My Arms (1995)
- Tall, Dark and Deadly (1995)
- The Marriage Test (1996)
- The Highwayman (1996)
- Baby in My Arms (1997)

==== Rebels & Rogues multi-author series ====
- The Wolf (1992)
