= Nina Raginsky =

Canadian photographer (born 1941)

- Born: April 14, 1941 (age 85); Montreal, Quebec
- Died: Salt Spring Island, B.C.
- Known for: photographer

Nina Raginsky CM OC, (born April 14, 1941) is a Canadian photographer who received the honour of the Order of Canada in 1984.

== Life and work ==
Born in Montreal, Quebec, she received a Bachelor of Arts degree from Rutgers University in New Jersey in 1962. While at Rutgers she studied painting with Roy Lichtenstein, sculpture with George Segal and Art History with Allan Kaprow.

Raginsky turned to photography seriously in 1963, doing freelance work for the National Film Board. She worked first in black and white but later began to sepia tone and hand-colour her prints. She has also created oil paintings based on photographs. After spending a year in Mexico, she returned to Canada in 1968 and began a project recording remote life in the Yukon and First Nations communities in British Columbia. The following year, she became an assistance curator of education at the Vancouver Art Gallery until 1972. She then began a series of photos documenting the city and people of Vancouver, Victoria, and British Columbia. Between 1972 and 1981, Raginsky was an instructor at the Emily Carr College of Art, formerly the Vancouver School of Art.

Her work has appeared in solo and group exhibitions in Canada and the US and in various magazines and books, including those of the National Film Board's "Image" series, "Canada: A Year of the Land" and "Between Friends". Magazines in which her work appeared include Queen (magazine), the Daily London Telegraph Magazine, and L'Express Paris. From 1962, her photographs have been in numerous exhibits at the George Eastman Museum Rochester, New York, the San Francisco Museum, the Burton Gallery in Toronto, the National Gallery of Canada, and the Photo Gallery in Ottawa, among others. She is best known for her frontal, full-figure portraits, particularly of eccentric or whimsical personalities. One such example is the 1974 work, The Kirkpatrick Sisters in front of the Empress Hotel, Victoria, British Columbia. Raginsky left the photographic medium during the 1980s and turned almost exclusively to painting. In 1985 she was made an Officer of the Order of Canada. She is a member of the Royal Canadian Academy of Arts.

In 2015, her photo Shoeshine Stand appeared on Canada Post postage stamps.

== Artistic inspiration ==
Nina Raginsky has cited German photographer, August Sander as inspiration for her portraits in particular his work, Men Without Masks.
