= Sandra Chastain =

American writer

Sandra Anglin Chastain (November 21, 1936, in Wadley, Georgia – September 24, 2016 in Smyrna, Georgia) was an American erotica novelist, best remembered for her Loveswept series of romance novels. During her career, she was a finalist for the Favorite Book of the Year award from the Romance Writers of America on two occasions, and was the recipient of the Maggie Award for Writing Excellence from the GA Romance Writers organisation, and Rising Star award from the Romantic Times Magazine.
