= Taieri =

Taieri may refer to several features in the Otago Region of New Zealand:

- Taieri River
- Strath Taieri, a glacial valley and river plateau
- Taieri Gorge
- Taieri Plain
- Taieri Island / Moturata, an island in the river mouth
- Taieri Mouth, a village at the river mouth
- Taieri Aerodrome
- The Taieri statistical area, which surrounds Whare Flat
- Taieri (New Zealand electorate)
- Taieri County, a former territorial authority
