= Lammermoor Range =

Mountain range in New Zealand

- Named features in the Lammermoor Range

Highest point
- Peak: Lammermoor
- Elevation: 1,160 m (3,810 ft)
- Coordinates: 45.72034°S 169.73742°E

Geography
- Location: South Island, New Zealand
- Range coordinates: 45°36′S 169°45′E

The Lammermoor Range is a range of rugged hills in Central Otago, in southern New Zealand.

== Geography ==
The range runs for approximately 30 kilometres northeast from the Lammerlaw Range before reaching the Sutton Stream which drains the saddle between it and the southern end of the Rock and Pillar Range and that flows to the east and into the Strath Taieri valley near Sutton Salt Lake, southwest of Middlemarch. The south east flank of the range is drained by Deep Stream a tributary of the Taieri River. The upper reaches of the Taieri River also drain the north western flank of the range. The highest point of the range is towards its south and called Lammermoor at 1,160 m (3,810 ft).

The parts of the range from about Ailsa Craig east are in Te Papanui Conservation Park.

=== Peaks ===
Named Peaks in Lammermoor Range
Name	Height	Coordinates
Lammermoor	1,160 metres (3,810 ft)	45.72034°S 169.73742°E}
Ailsa Craig	1,132 m (3,714 ft)	45.64815°S 169.78888°E

== Naming ==
The range was named for the Lammermuir Hills in south east Scotland, possibly influenced by the spelling of Walter Scott's novel The Bride of Lammermoor, which is set in those hills.

== Environment ==
The Lammermoor Range was the designated site for Project Hayes, a giant controversial wind farm proposal which was abandoned in 2012.

The range is one of only two sites where the Nationally Endangered Burgan skink has previously been found.
