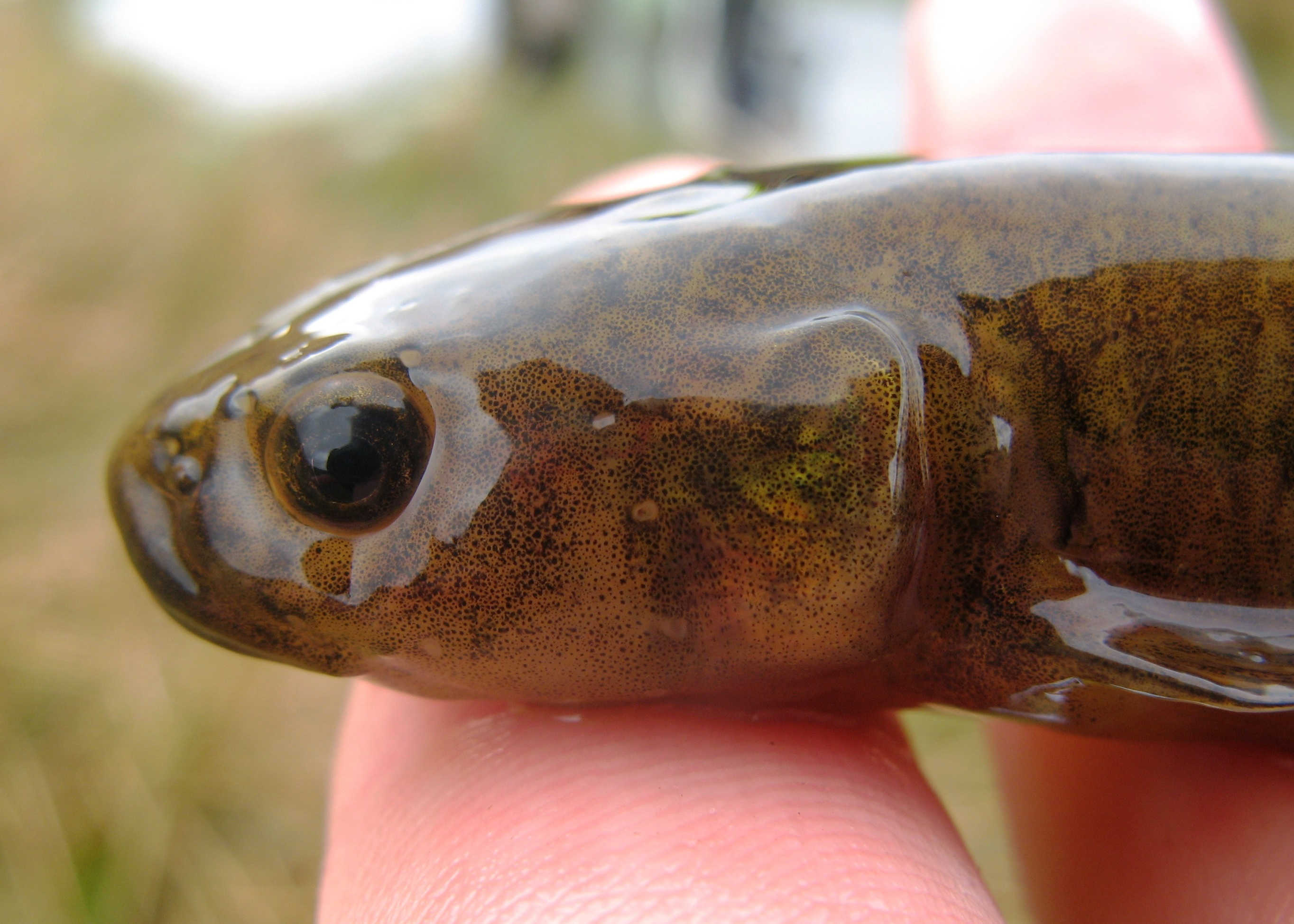

Conservation status
- Critically Endangered (IUCN 3.1)

- Nationally Endangered (NZ TCS)

Scientific classification
- Kingdom: Animalia
- Phylum: Chordata
- Class: Actinopterygii
- Division: Teleostei
- Order: Galaxiiformes
- Family: Galaxiidae
- Genus: Galaxias
- Species: G. eldoni

Binomial name
- Galaxias eldoni McDowall, 1997
- Approximate known distribution (in orange) of Eldon's galaxias on a map of the South Island

= Eldon's galaxias =

Species of fish

Eldon's galaxias (Galaxias eldoni) is an endangered galaxiid fish endemic to New Zealand. One of several fishes in the genus Galaxias found in Central Otago, it has a very small home range and is at risk of being driven to extinction by trout introduced for recreational fishing.

== Taxonomy ==
Eldon's galaxias was described in 1997 by New Zealand freshwater ichthyologist Bob McDowall from specimens collected in 1995 and 1996. It is part of the Galaxias vulgaris species complex, and differs from Galaxias pullus, another new species McDowall had found in the same area genetically and by its colour pattern: irregular stripes that continue across its back. The name recognises the ichthyologist G. A. (Tony) Eldon, who helped collect specimens and had retired not long before McDowall described this species.

== Description ==
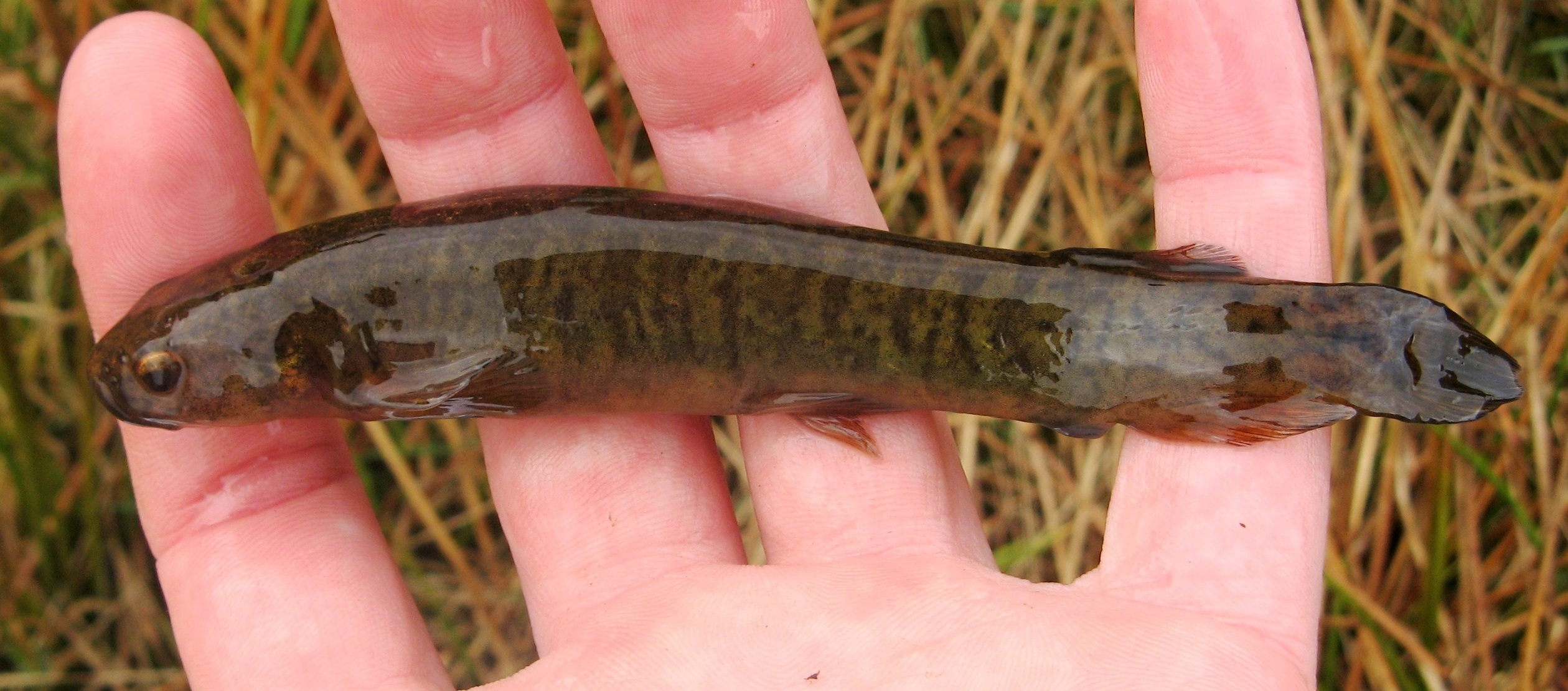
Galaxias eldoni from a stream in the Lammerlaw Ranges, Otago, New Zealand

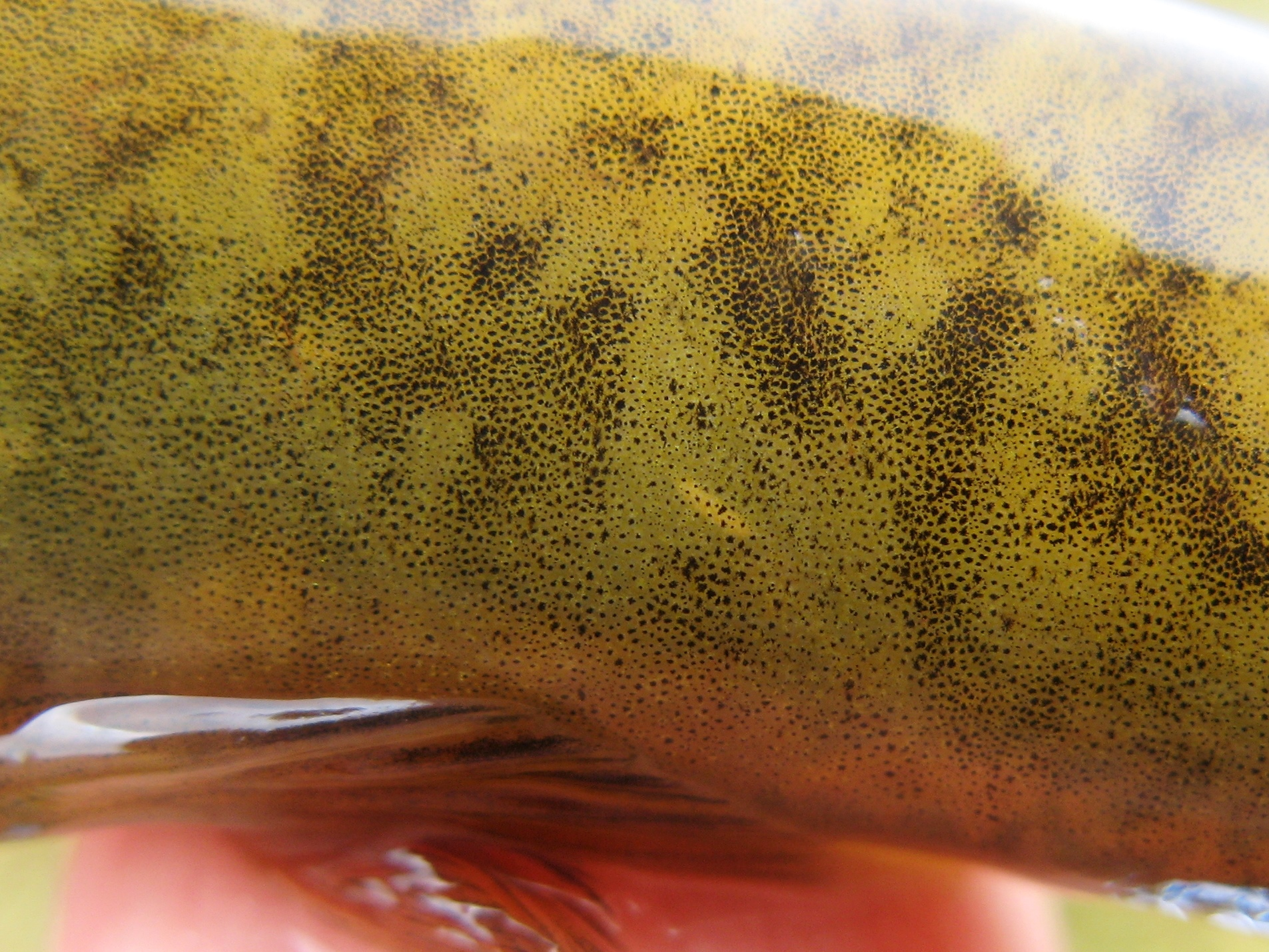
G. eldoni has irregular brown markings and a dusting of gold.

External videos
- Wild Dunedin: Eldon's Galaxias – last chance to see (2010 short film by Roland Kahurangi)

Galaxias eldoni is an elongated, deep-bodied Galaxias, usually 80 mm in length (although very large individuals can reach 155 mm). Its snout shape is variable depending on whether it lives on a stream or wetland habitat. It has large pectoral and pelvic fins, and a dorsal fin that starts forward of the anal fin. It is orange-brown to olive-brown with very variable dark brown markings that can be speckles, spots, or irregular bands, and its skin is heavily dusted with gold. Sometimes it has a small black patch behind the gill cover (operculum). Unlike all other Galaxias (except G. divergens), it has only 15 caudal fin rays and no pyloric caeca.

== Habitat and distribution ==
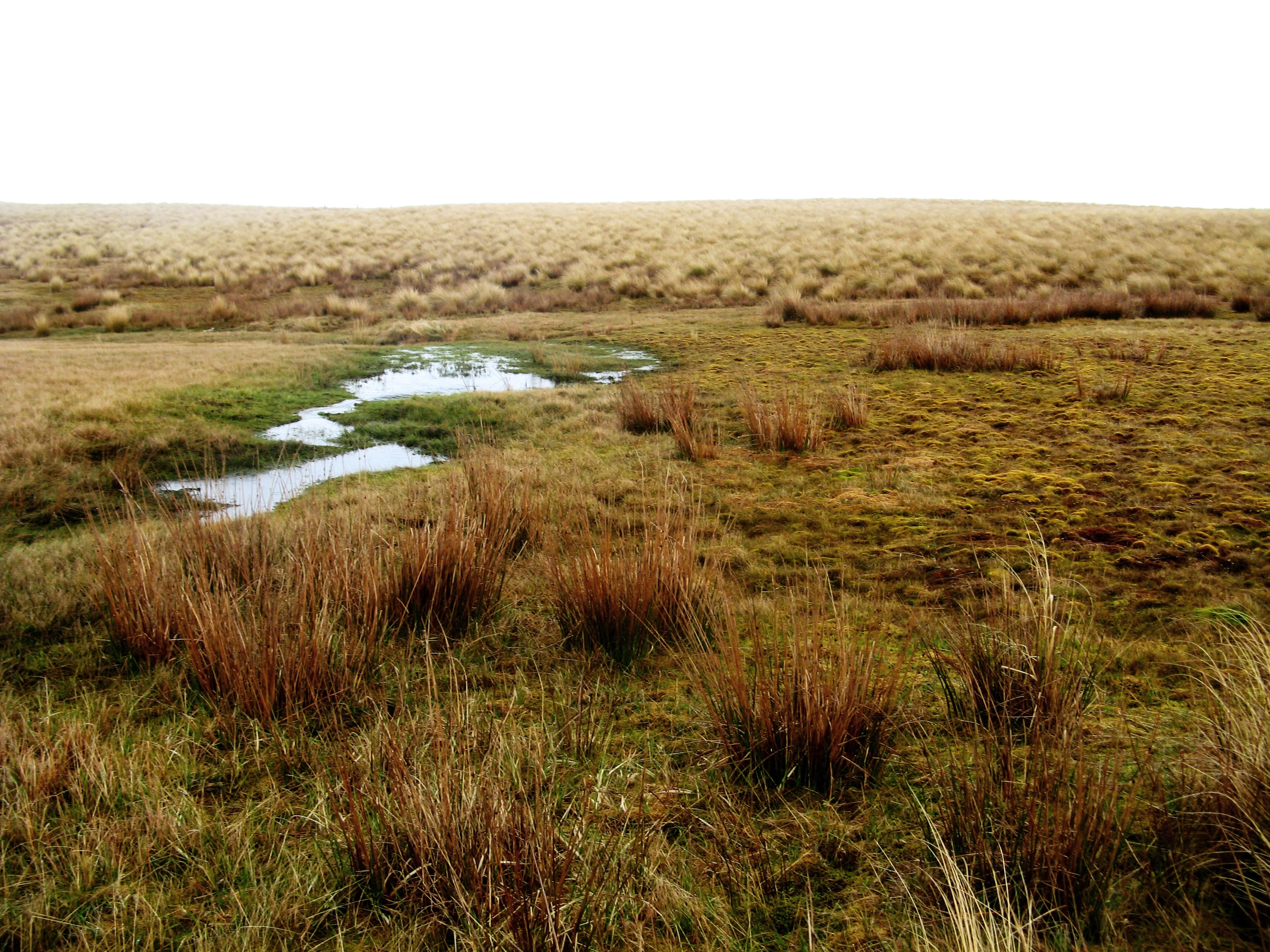
Habitat of Eldon's galaxias: a deep spring-fed stream on the Lammerlaw Range.

This species lives only in eastern waterways of Otago, in wetlands and small streams that flow into the Taieri, Tokomairiro and Waipori rivers and below Lake Mahinerangi. These streams tend to be shallow, fast flowing and stony, ranging from lowland forested areas to alpine. G. eldoni lives among the gravels or under the banks of the waterway. It is a relatively good climber, able to wriggle up wet rocky slopes, and is able to negotiate waterfalls up to 3 m high. It tends to be found upstream of waterfalls that block the movement of introduced salmonid fishes such as brown trout, rainbow trout, and brook char. Its original distribution was likely much larger, but trout species have eradicated it in all but the headwaters which make up its current home range.

== Feeding ==
Galaxias eldoni feeds on small freshwater invertebrates such as stoneflies and mayflies. They will also feed on larger prey like freshwater crayfish/kōura, and food that is carried by the current.

== Life cycle ==
Unlike the more well-known 'whitebait' Galaxias species, G. eldoni is not diadromous; its entire life is spent in fresh water. It is long-lived, 15 years or longer; some fully-grown individuals have been tagged and then recaptured 10 years later. It is slow growing, reaching maturity at one (males) or two years (females). Females produce low numbers of large eggs during October. Spawning occurs at the stream edge in riffles, and eggs are laid directly into the stony stream bottom. Larvae hatch 4–6 weeks later. The larvae are large and are able to swim effectively; they do not disperse far from where they were spawned.

== Conservation ==
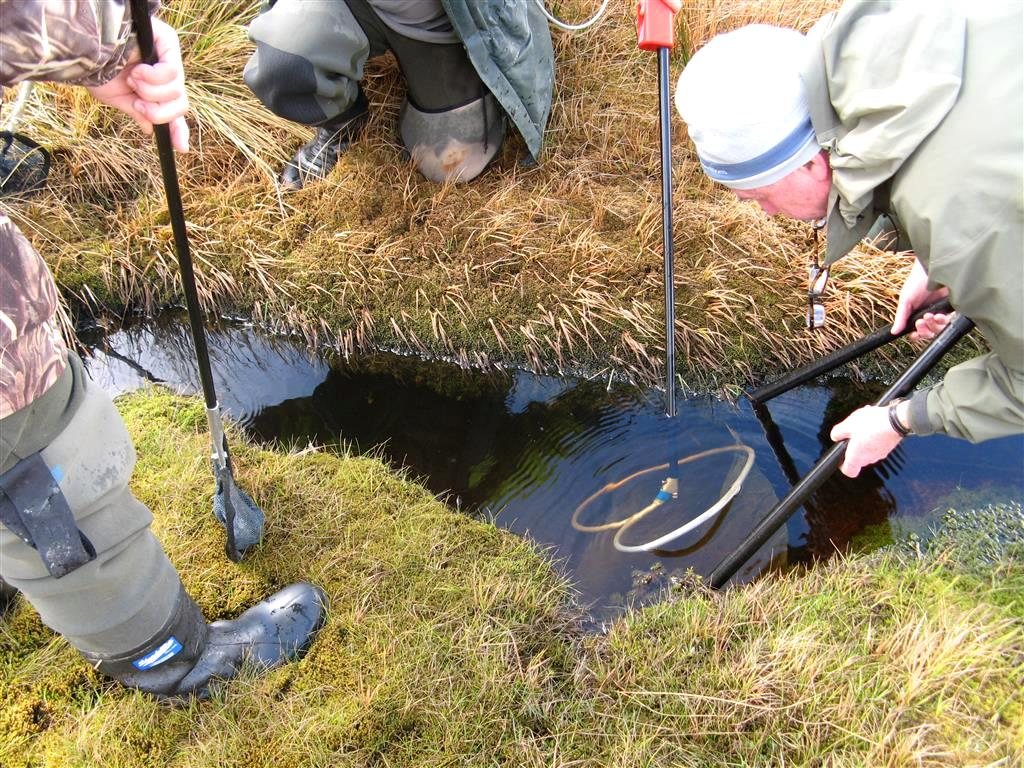
Electrofishing for Eldon's galaxias (Galaxias eldoni) in a deep spring-fed stream on the Lammerlaw ranges, Otago, New Zealand.

This species is rated Nationally Endangered by the Department of Conservation and critically endangered by the IUCN, due to its small number of streams it occupies (an area of just 0.69 km^{2}) and the threats of invasive species. Because G. eldoni lays very few eggs and has large, poorly dispersing fry, it is vulnerable to predation by introduced trout. Since the species was described in 1997 several small populations have been driven extinct from conversion of land to forestry or farming. The building of irrigation canals has allowed the closely related species Galaxias pullus to invade its range and hybridise with it. Currently there are protected areas for this species in the Lammerlaw Range, but they are vulnerable to being invaded by trout, or trout being deliberately introduced.
