= Taieri Mouth =

- Rural settlement
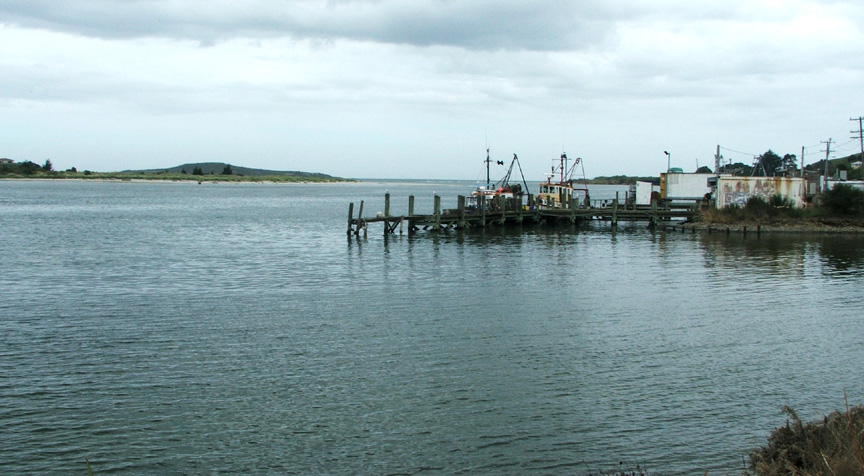
- Fishing boats moored at Taieri Mouth
- Interactive map of Taieri Mouth
- Coordinates: 46°03′15″S 170°11′32″E
- Country: New Zealand
- Region: Otago
- Territorial authority: Clutha District
- Ward: Bruce
- Electorates: Taieri; Te Tai Tonga (Māori)

Government
  - Territorial authority: Clutha District Council
  - Regional council: Otago Regional Council
  - Mayor of Clutha: Jock Martin
  - Taieri MP: Ingrid Leary
  - Te Tai Tonga MP: Tākuta Ferris

Area
  - Total: 3.25 km^{2} (1.25 sq mi)

Population (June 2025)
  - Total: 350
  - Density: 110/km^{2} (280/sq mi)
- Time zone: UTC+12 (New Zealand Standard Time)
  - Summer (DST): UTC+13 (New Zealand Daylight Time)
- Postcode: 9091
- Local iwi: Ngāi Tahu

Taieri Mouth is a small fishing village at the mouth of the Taieri River, New Zealand. Taieri Island (Moturata) lies in the ocean several hundred metres off the river's mouth.

It has a white sand beach for swimming and several picnic areas. Moturata is a distinctive landmark which can be walked to at low-tide. Caution is advised as the tides can change quickly. Another feature is the millennium walking track that follows the Taieri River from the mouth through the lower gorge to Henley.

The village is located 40 kilometres (25 mi) southwest of central Dunedin on the Southern Scenic Route. It is located in the Clutha District on the boundary of Dunedin City and 10 kilometres (6.2 mi) east of Lake Waihola. Immediately to its south is the smaller settlement of Taieri Beach, and the two are often considered parts of the same settlement.

It gained a little notoriety or sadness in the 1990s, relating to the Bain family murders, as the place where Robin Bain worked as the school principal.

== History ==
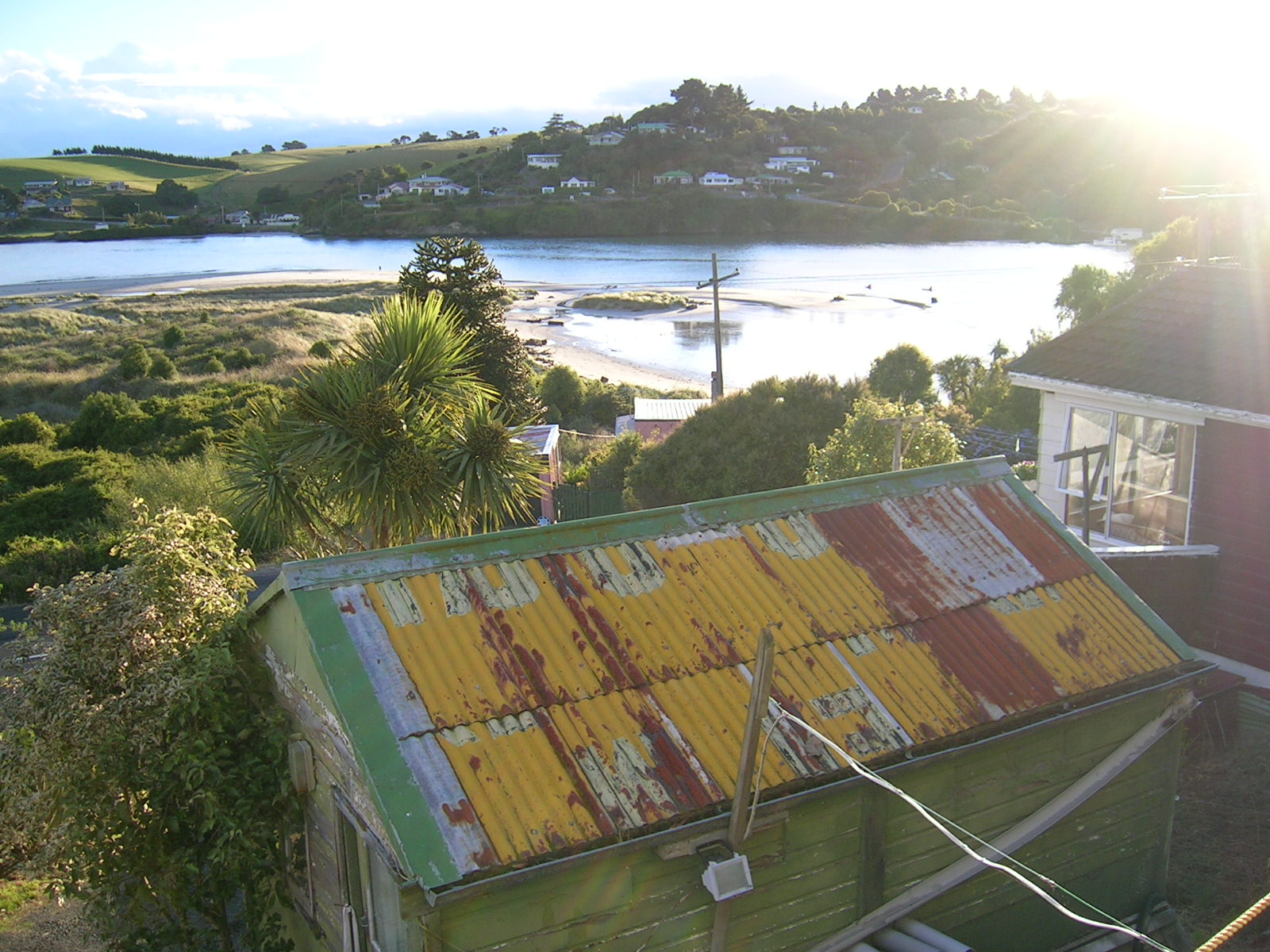
Colourful shed at Taieri Mouth

There was a Māori occupation site at Taieri Mouth, with moa bones, indicating it was from the Moa Hunter (early) period of Māori culture.

According to oral tradition in the early 18th century Tuwiriroa moved from Mount Aspiring / Tititea on the Kawarau River near modern Queenstown and built a pā, Motupara, near Taieri Mouth. A rival, Tukiauau, had already built a pā, Whakaraupuka, inland on the Taieri Plain by Lake Waihola. Tuwiriroa had a daughter Haki Te Kura, famous for swimming across Lake Wakatipu. Tukiauau had a handsome son Korokiwhiti. The daughter and son now fell in love but the woman's father, the chief of the Taieri Mouth pā, disapproved. The young man's father was a hunted man. Hearing his enemies had discovered his whereabouts he decided to abandon the upriver settlement and move his people further south. As they came down the river in their canoes the distraught young woman attempted to jump from a rock into her lover's craft but struck the prow and was killed. Adding insult to injury her head was severed and held up angrily to her people on the shore as the flotilla passed by to the sea. There were repercussions and Tukiauau and his son were pursued and eventually killed.

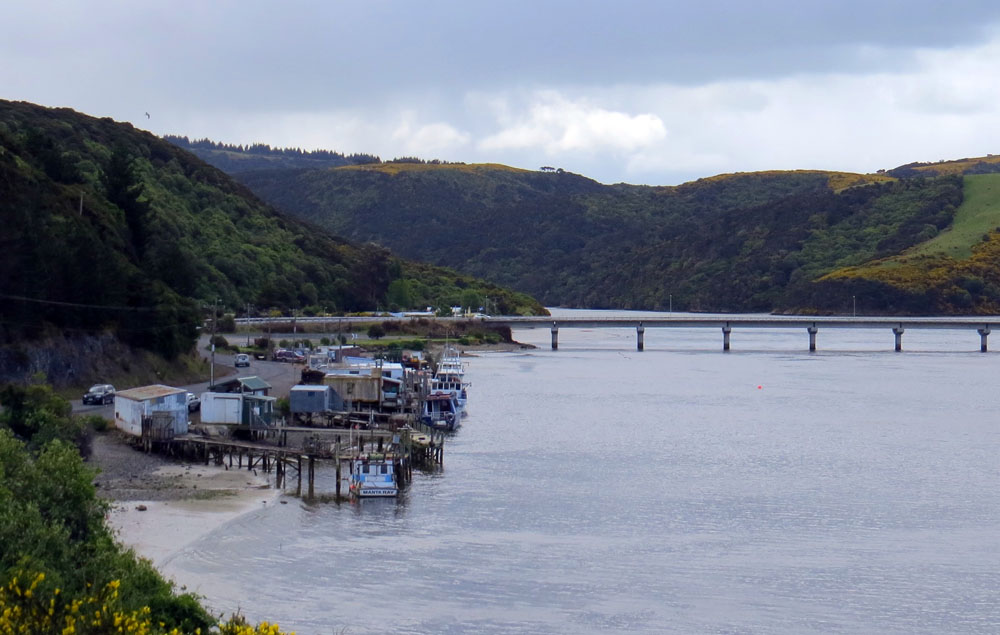
Bridge across the estuary of the Taieri River, Taieri Mouth

Maori occupation continued and Edward Shortland recorded a small settlement on the site in 1843 and Maori were still living here in 1850. An early European settler was a former whaler, 'The Hermit of Taieri Mouth' (also known as John Bull) whose real name was John Edward O'Neil. He is remembered for his boisterous ways and prodigious strength.

On 4 July 2024 the area saw the finding of a deceased intact 5 metres (16 ft) male blackish-silver specimen of the almost unknown Mesoplodon traversii (spade-toothed whale) was washed ashore.

== Demographics ==
Taieri Mouth is described by Statistics New Zealand as a rural settlement. It covers 3.25 km^{2} (1.25 sq mi), and had an estimated population of 350 as of June 2025, with a population density of 108 people per km^{2}. It is part of the much larger Bruce statistical area.

Historical population
Year	Pop.	±% p.a.
2006	189	—
2013	195	+0.45%
2018	252	+5.26%

Taieri Mouth had a population of 252 at the 2018 New Zealand census, an increase of 57 people (29.2%) since the 2013 census, and an increase of 63 people (33.3%) since the 2006 census. There were 108 households, comprising 132 males and 123 females, giving a sex ratio of 1.07 males per female. The median age was 52.8 years (compared with 37.4 years nationally), with 39 people (15.5%) aged under 15 years, 18 (7.1%) aged 15 to 29, 123 (48.8%) aged 30 to 64, and 72 (28.6%) aged 65 or older.

Ethnicities were 95.2% European/Pākehā, 10.7% Māori, 1.2% Pasifika, and 3.6% other ethnicities. People may identify with more than one ethnicity.

Although some people chose not to answer the census's question about religious affiliation, 54.8% had no religion, 29.8% were Christian, 1.2% had Māori religious beliefs and 1.2% had other religions.

Of those at least 15 years old, 36 (16.9%) people had a bachelor's or higher degree, and 57 (26.8%) people had no formal qualifications. The median income was $28,000, compared with $31,800 nationally. 15 people (7.0%) earned over $70,000 compared to 17.2% nationally. The employment status of those at least 15 was that 81 (38.0%) people were employed full-time, 45 (21.1%) were part-time, and 3 (1.4%) were unemployed.

== Education ==
Taieri Beach School was a co-educational state primary school for Year 1 to 8 students, with a roll of 5 as of July 2026. The school opened in 1862. In September 2026 it was announced the school, which had been due for a review in 2027 after a consistently declining roll, would be permanently closed after all enrolled students left.

== Climate ==
Climate data for Taieri Mouth (1981–2010)
Month	Jan	Feb	Mar	Apr	May	Jun	Jul	Aug	Sep	Oct	Nov	Dec	Year
Mean daily maximum °C (°F)	18.5 (65.3)	18.5 (65.3)	16.9 (62.4)	15.0 (59.0)	12.7 (54.9)	10.6 (51.1)	9.9 (49.8)	11.1 (52.0)	13.2 (55.8)	14.3 (57.7)	15.9 (60.6)	16.9 (62.4)	14.5 (58.0)
Daily mean °C (°F)	14.2 (57.6)	14.1 (57.4)	12.6 (54.7)	10.5 (50.9)	8.6 (47.5)	6.6 (43.9)	5.7 (42.3)	6.8 (44.2)	8.6 (47.5)	9.8 (49.6)	11.4 (52.5)	12.8 (55.0)	10.1 (50.3)
Mean daily minimum °C (°F)	9.8 (49.6)	9.8 (49.6)	8.3 (46.9)	6.0 (42.8)	4.6 (40.3)	2.7 (36.9)	1.5 (34.7)	2.4 (36.3)	4.0 (39.2)	5.3 (41.5)	7.0 (44.6)	8.6 (47.5)	5.8 (42.5)
Average rainfall mm (inches)	61.5 (2.42)	54.2 (2.13)	73.2 (2.88)	54.6 (2.15)	96.6 (3.80)	69.7 (2.74)	78.1 (3.07)	61.6 (2.43)	57.9 (2.28)	69.4 (2.73)	50.1 (1.97)	81.0 (3.19)	807.9 (31.79)
Source: NIWA (Rain 1971-2000)
