= Lake Waipori =

Lake in Otago, New Zealand

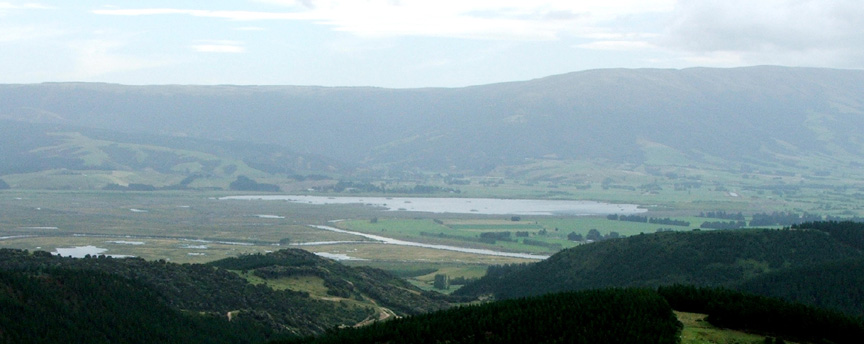
- The lake and its surrounding wetlands, seen from the hills to the southeast. The Sinclair Wetlands are to the left of the picture.

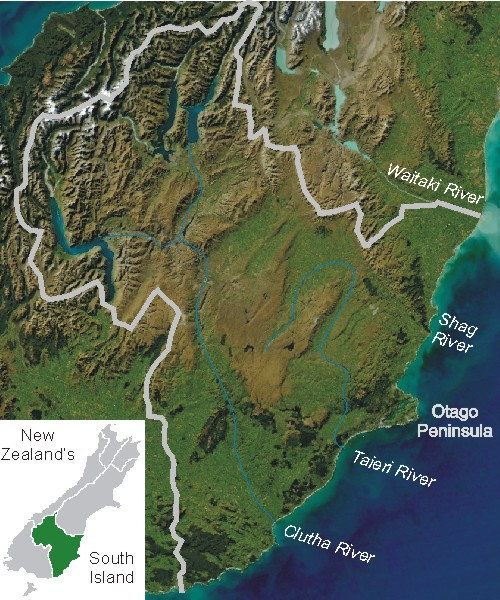
- Location within Otago peninsula
- Location: South Island
- Coordinates: 45°58′S 170°07′E
- Type: Natural freshwater lake
- Primary inflows: Waipori River
- Primary outflows: Waipori River
- Basin countries: New Zealand
- Max. length: 2.4 km (1.5 mi)
- Max. width: 1.52 km (0.94 mi)

Lake Waipori is the smaller and shallower of the pair of lakes located in the wetlands to the south west of Dunedin in New Zealand on the Waipori River. The Waipori River is a major tributary of the Taieri River, and these wetlands form the southern edge of the Taieri Plains.

The lake is inhabited by various waterfowl and wetland birds. It is however too shallow and inaccessible (due to being surrounded with wetlands) to allow for recreation other than fishing and duck hunting in season.

It is possible to travel from the Waipori River at Berwick through the lake and through to Lake Waihola in a flat bottomed dinghy or jetboat. The lake is too shallow for other forms of motorboat.

The lake is bordered to the southwest by the Sinclair Wetlands.
