= Maungatua =

Hill in Otago, New Zealand

- Mauka Atua
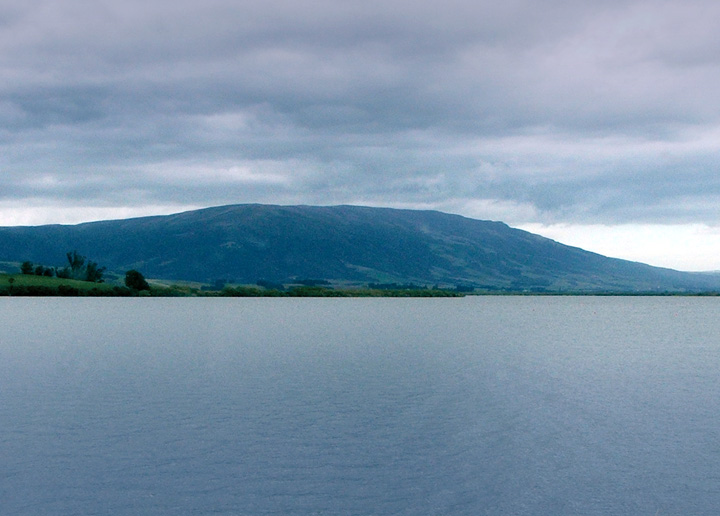
- From the shore of Lake Waihola, 15 kilometres to the south

Highest point
- Elevation: 895 m (2,936 ft)
- Coordinates: 45.881°S 170.112°E

Geography
- Location: South Island, New Zealand

Maungatua, known also as Mauka Atua is a prominent ridge in the Taieri Plains in Otago, New Zealand.

It rises 895 metres (2,936 ft) above the floodplain of the Taieri River, directly to the west of Dunedin's airport at Momona. It can be clearly seen from much of Dunedin's urban area, 35 kilometres (22 mi), and from as far south as the outskirts of Balclutha, 65 kilometres (40 mi) to the southwest. Lake Mahinerangi is located on the western side of Maungatua.

The name Maungatua in Māori literally means "Hill of the Spirits", and is spelt Mauka Atua by Ngāi Tahu local to the Otago Region. The name is a reference to an ancestral chief who arrived on the Āraiteuru migratory waka.

== Ecology of Maungatua ==
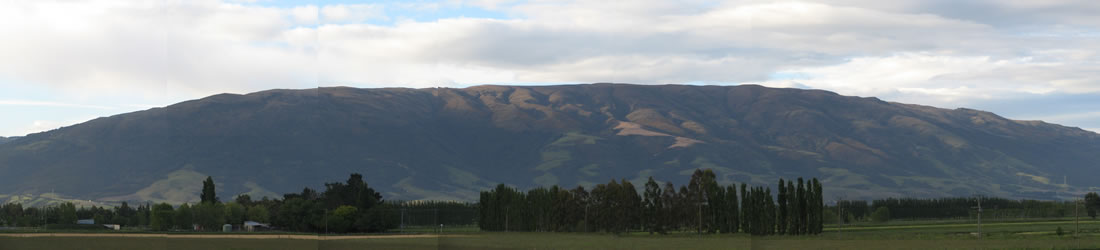
Maungatua, Otago

Maungatua features a diverse range of plant species. The summit features tussock grassland and cushion bogs, whilst the sub-alpine zone includes shrubland and tussock grasslands. Carnivorous insect eating plants called sundews are found within swamps at the summit. Silver beech dominates the montane slopes, particularly on the southern face. This transitions to lowland podocarp forest which extends into the Waipori Gorge. This includes a mixture of broadleaf and kānuka forest. In addition, the only naturally occurring kāmahi in the Dunedin area are found in the southern Maungatua in Mill Creek. Glowworms may also be found living in mānuka trees at the base of Maungatua.
