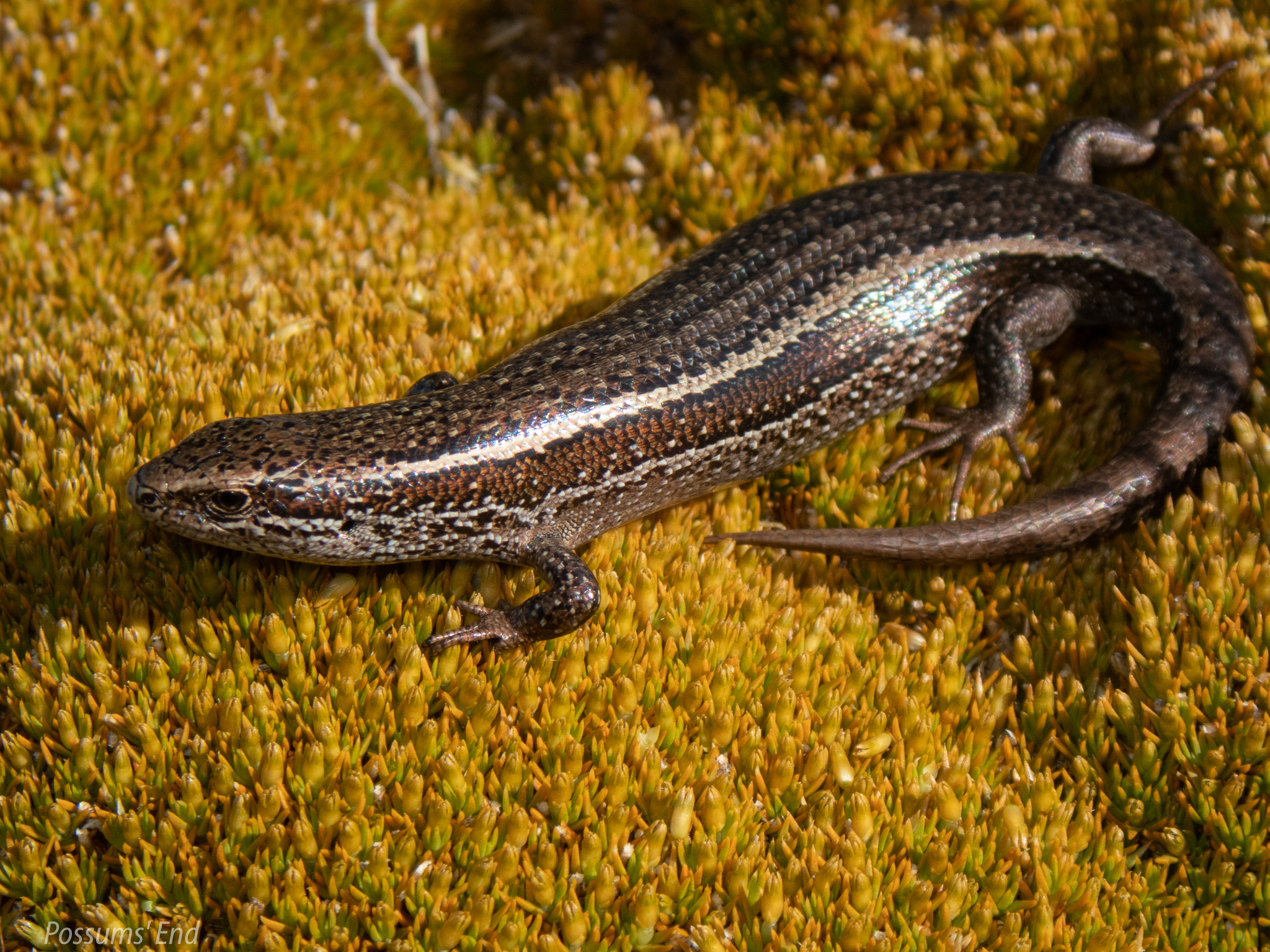

Conservation status
- Critically Endangered (IUCN 3.1)

Scientific classification
- Kingdom: Animalia
- Phylum: Chordata
- Class: Reptilia
- Order: Squamata
- Family: Scincidae
- Genus: Oligosoma
- Species: O. burganae

Binomial name
- Oligosoma burganae Chapple, Bell, Chapple, Miller, Patterson & Daugherty, 2011
- Distribution of Oligosoma burganae on a map of the South Island Known native range

Synonyms
- Leiolopisma inconspicuum Patterson & Daugherty 1990; Leiolopisma nigriplantare maccanni Patterson 1984

= Burgan skink =

Species of lizard

The Burgan skink (Oligosoma burganae) is a nationally endangered species of skink native to New Zealand. It was described from a specimen found near the Burgan Stream, in the Rock and Pillar Range, Central Otago.

== Description ==
The Burgan skink has a glossy brown colour with a yellow grey abdomen. It has minimal or no scales on the interior edge of its ear opening and usually only three supraocular scales on the crown above the eye. It has a head that is blunter than similar Oligosoma species.

== Distribution and habitat ==
The Burgan skinks preferred habitat are herbs and shrubs above 900 m in the mountainous regions of the Rock and Pillar Ranges as well as in the Lammermoor ranges of Central Otago.

== Conservation status ==
As of 2012 the Department of Conservation (DOC) classified the Burgan skink as Nationally Endangered under the New Zealand Threat Classification System. A 2012 survey in the Lammermoor and Rock and Pillar Ranges did not reveal any sightings of Burgan skinks. They have since been found in low numbers in a few sites in this area.
