= Henley, New Zealand =

Township near Dunedin, Otago Region, New Zealand

Coordinates: 45°58′50″S 170°09′55″E

Henley is a township on New Zealand's Taieri Plains, named after the rowing centre Henley-on-Thames in England. It lies close to the confluence of the Taieri and Waipori Rivers at the eastern edge of the plain, at the foot of a low range of coastal hills. The township lies close to the ecologically significant Sinclair Wetlands, which lie 3.5 kilometres (2.2 mi) to the west.

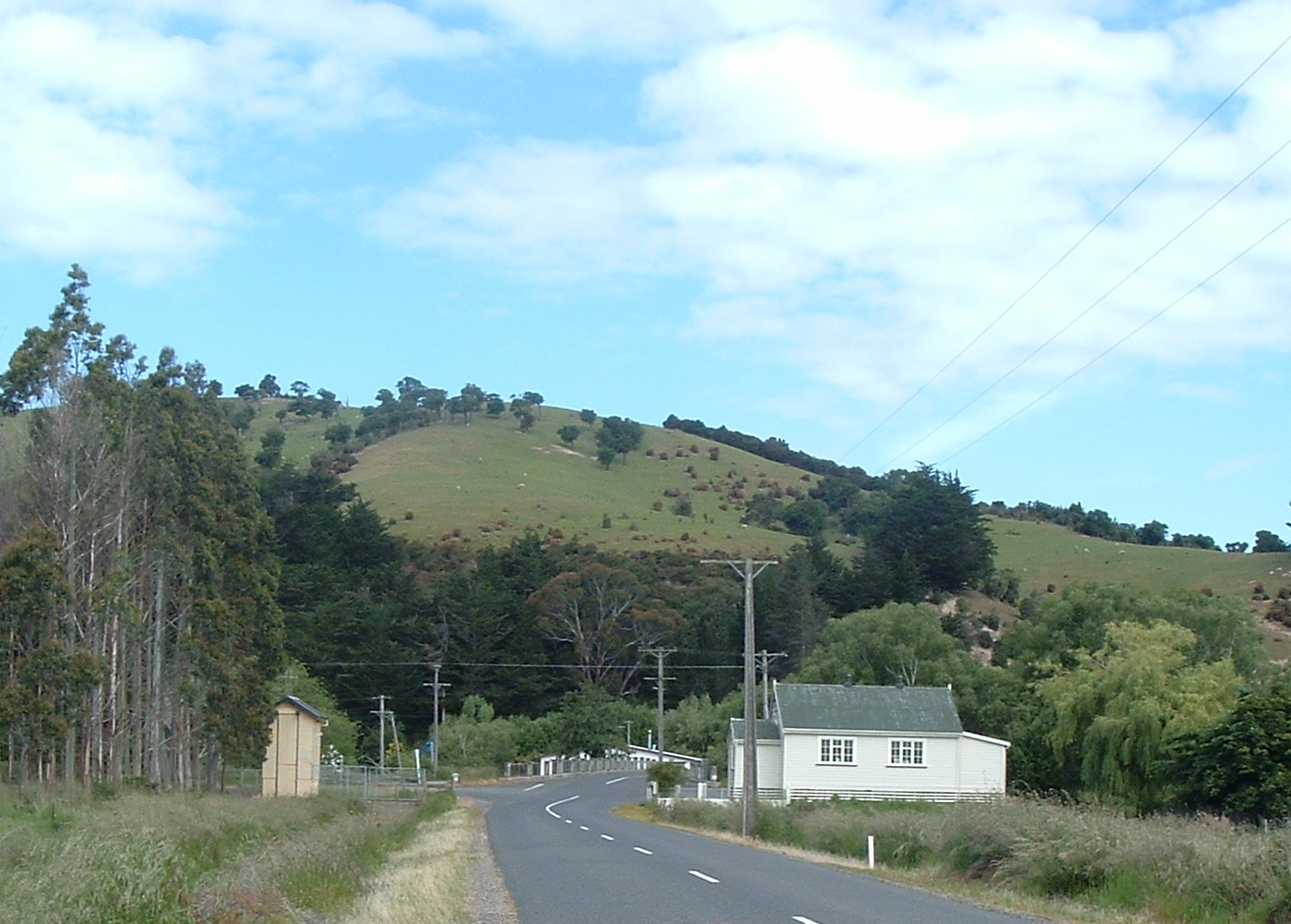
Church and bridge over the Taieri River, south of Henley

Henley is near the south-west extremity of the City of Dunedin, 35 km from the city centre, and close to Lake Waihola, one of the country's rowing centres. Henley's population is about 250. The town was founded at some point prior to 1880.

The main industry is dairy farming. Henley used to have a cheese factory which later moved to the nearby township of Momona. This was later bought out by the company that became Mainland Cheese. The churches in Henley are Presbyterian and Brethren.

The original Māori name for Henley is Maitapapa. A pre-European Maori settlement lay to the south of Henley, close to the Taieri River.

Henley township is prone to flooding by the Taieri River. SH1 is built on top of the bank that divides the larger Henley area, known as "The flood-free highway". Henley's main road lies roughly parallel to and south of this highway.The two roads are connected to the south at Titri and to the north at Otokia, and a connecting road runs between the two roads, crossing a bridge over the Taeri River close to the centre of the township.

In June 1980 the South Taieri region experienced severe floods that flooded both sides of the highway and extended as far as Dunedin International Airport at Momona. Contributing factors to this were already full wetlands at Lake Waihola with the Taieri and Waipori Rivers both draining into this area. Excessive water from the Lake Mahinerangi dam was also released at this time. This placed significant pressure on the banks causing a breach.
