= Lake Waihola =

Lake in the South Island of New Zealand

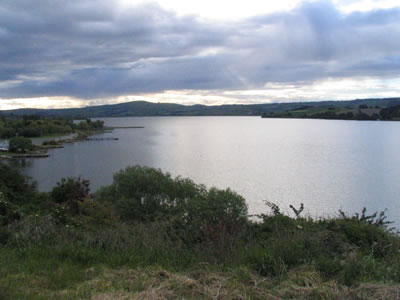
- Lake Waihola

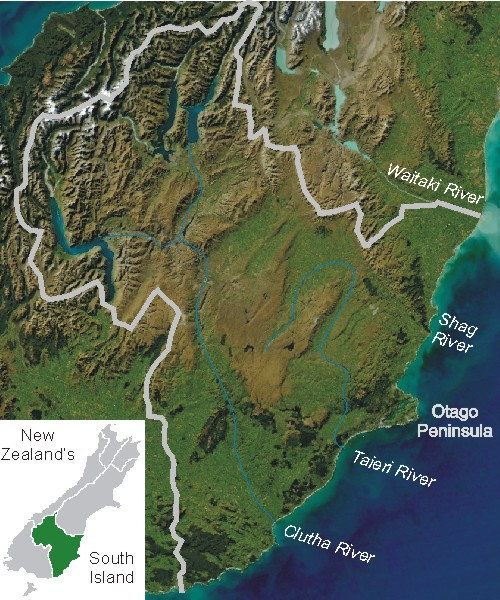
- Location within Otago peninsula
- Interactive map of Lake Waihola
- Location: Clutha District, Otago Region, South Island
- Coordinates: 46°01′S 170°06′E
- Primary outflows: Waipori River
- Basin countries: New Zealand
- Surface area: 9 km^{2} (3.5 sq mi)

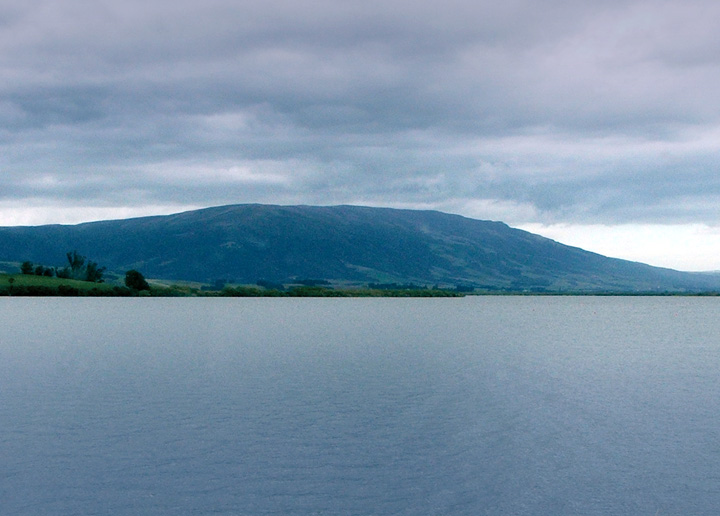
Looking north towards Maungatua

Lake Waihola is a 640 ha tidal freshwater lake located 15 km north of Milton in Otago, in New Zealand's South Island. Its area is some 9 square kilometres, with a maximum length of 6 kilometres and a mean depth of 0.75m.

It is the larger of a pair of existing lakes—the other being Lake Waipori—which lie in a small area of low hills between the Taieri and Tokomairaro. Waihola is drained by the Waipori River, a tributary of the Taieri. Both lakes are very shallow and surrounded by wetlands, including the internationally renowned and protected Sinclair Wetlands which are the home to many species of wading birds. This shallowness is reflected in the name Waihola, the southern Māori form of the word waihora, which means "spreading waters".

Lake Waihola is a popular day trip for holidaymakers from Dunedin, 40 km to the north. The small township of Waihola (population 200), nestled against the lake's eastern edge, has facilities for fishing, yachting, and waterskiing, and the lake is an important rowing venue.

== History ==
Lake Waihola was used in the Otago gold rush. Ships used to travel up the Taieri River and across to the southern side of the lake where prospectors would traverse the hills and on to Gabriel's Gully. In the early days of settlement a paddle-steamer, the Betsy Douglas, plied the lake's waters from Owhiro, near Henley in the north to Clarendon at the lake's southern end.

Lake Waihola is located at the southern end of the lower Taieri Plains and is the largest of a group of historical lakes that were once distributed between Lake Waihola and Mosgiel. Other neighbouring historical lakes include Lake Tatawai, Loch Ascog, Loch Katrine, Lake Potaka and Silverstream Lagoon

== Etymology ==
Waihola's name creates some interest as the Māori alphabet generally does not contain the letter 'L'. It is, however, found in Southern Māori dialect, and is also found in several other central and southern South Island place names, such as Wangaloa in Otago and Little Akaloa in Canterbury. The word Waihola is generally accepted to be the southern variant of the word wai-hora, meaning "spreading waters".

== Ecosystems ==
Lake Waihola has attracted international interest due to the ecosystems based in a shallow freshwater tidal system. Since 2000, Danish scientists have been conducting annual studies of the lake. Waihola is reputedly the home to a species of otter, the cryptid waitoreke, but no verified sightings have ever confirmed the animal's existence.

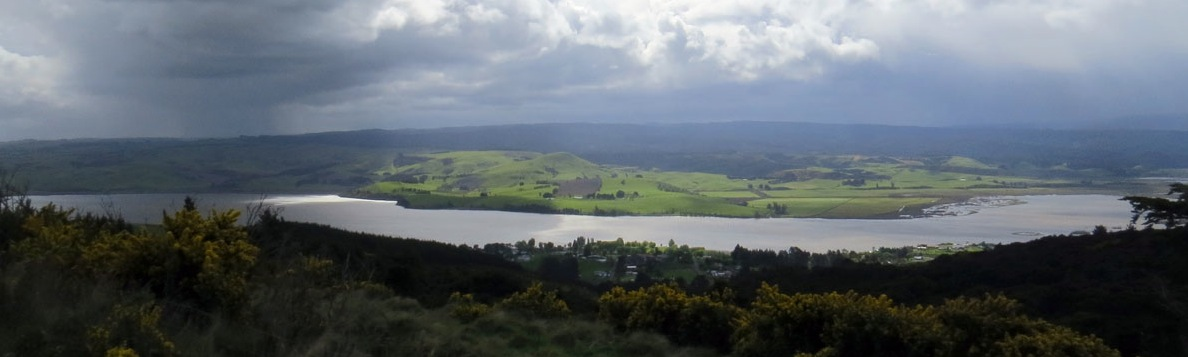
Panorama of Lake Waihola, seen from the hills to the southeast. Part of the settlement of Waihola is visible in the centre of the image.

== Health warnings ==
Health warnings related to algae have been issued on the lake as of March 2017.

== See also ==
- Pitt Lake, a similar freshwater tidal lake in British Columbia, Canada.
