= Taieri Island / Moturata =

Island in New Zealand

Māori: Moturata/Taieri
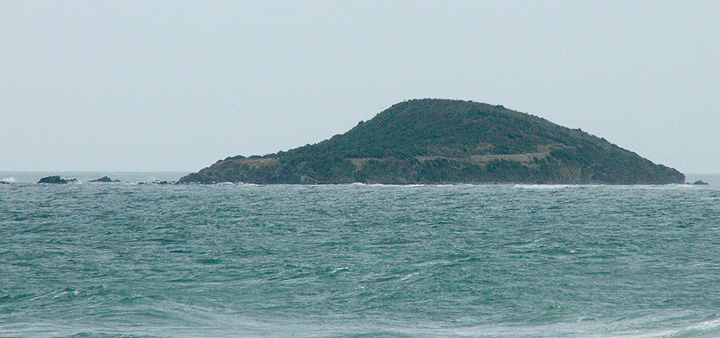
- Moturata / Taieri Island
- Interactive map of Taieri Island / Moturata

Geography
- Location: Otago region
- Coordinates: 46.057812°S 170.217369°E

Administration
- New Zealand

Demographics
- Population: 0

Taieri Island / Moturata, also called Taieri Island, is an island in the mouth of the Taieri River in southern New Zealand. It is a tidal island connected to the mainland by a sandy causeway at low tide.

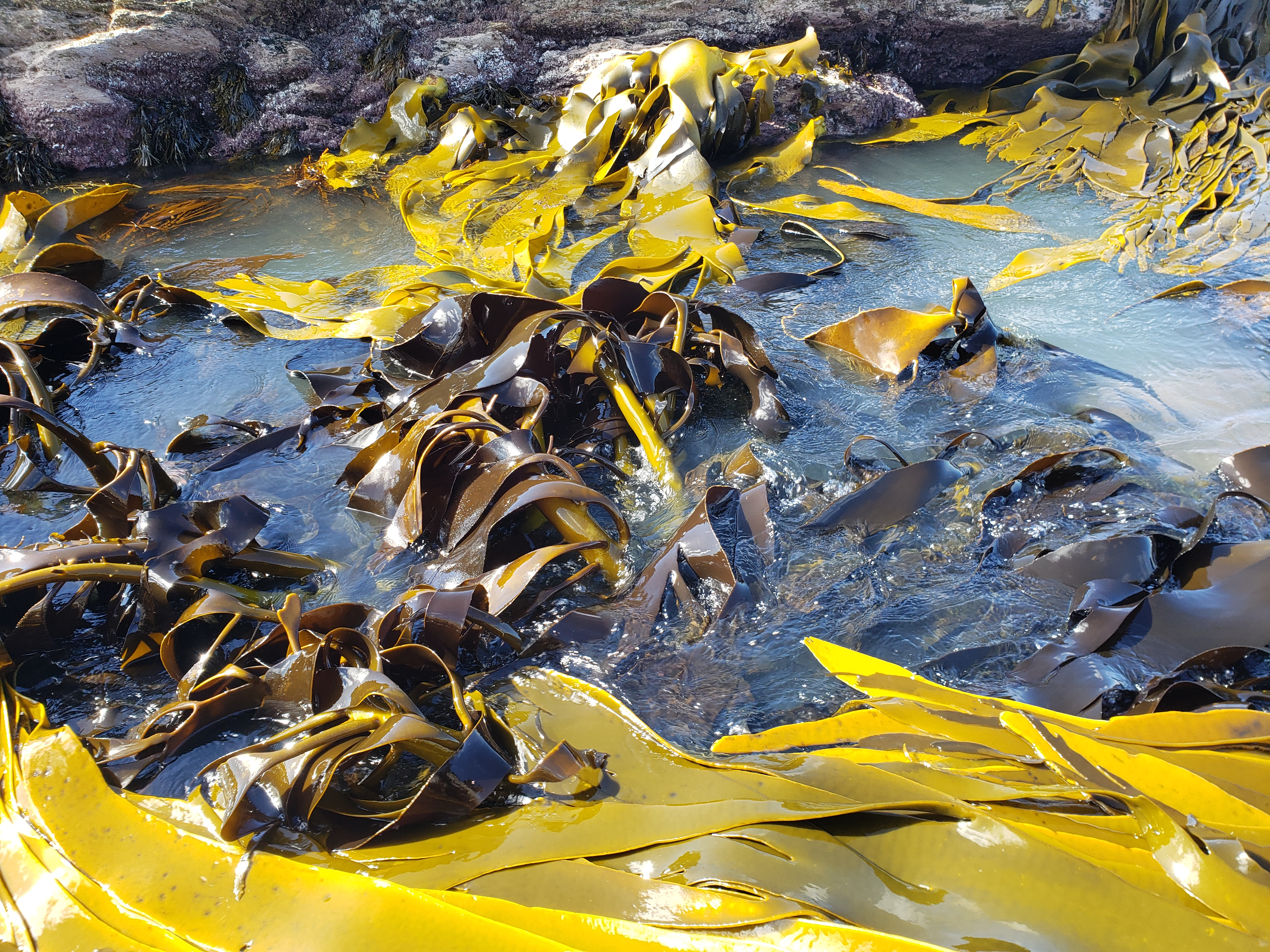
Durvillaea willana southern bull-kelp growing on Taieri Island

The island is a nature reserve, and is home to many protected seabirds, notably yellow-eyed penguins. It was the site of a whaling station, primarily targeting southern right whales and secondly humpbacks and others in the 1830s and 40s. Many shore-whaling stations were operating all around New Zealand's coastline in this time, causing whale numbers to deplete to almost extinction. Today, whales are making a comeback slowly, occasionally being seen in this area in their migrating season. In June 2006, a pod of four southern right whales were seen frolicking off Taieri Mouth. The group was composed of 3 males and 1 female, thought to be a mating group, which had not been observed in the waters of New Zealand for long period.

== History ==
Taieri Island may have been the "Isle of Wight" where The Brothers, a Sydney sealer chartered by Robert Campbell and commanded by Robert Mason landed eight of a gang of eleven men in November 1809. William Tucker, to Māori "Taka" and "Wioree" who settled in 1815 at Whareakeake (Murdering Beach) near the Otago Heads, was in the gang. Alternatively the "Isle of Wight" may be Green Island a few kilometres along the coast to the north.

In 1839 the Weller brothers of the Otago station on Otago Harbour established an outstation at Taieri Island, which they operated for three years. Edward Shortland recorded that it caught 70 tuns of oil in 1839, 15 in 1840 and 8 in 1841. The station operated under Mr. Cureton. In the evening of 9 June 1839 the schooner Dublin Packet, under the command of Captain Wells, was wrecked while attempting to pick up oil from the island station. She lost the second mate, the steward and a mentally ill man named "Dole" or "Cole" who was being sent from the Wellers' Otago station to Sydney.

In 1844, Johnny Jones of Waikouaiti briefly revived whaling on the island where Tommy Chaseland (who was of Australian aboriginal descent), with his wife Puna, Te Matenga Taiaroa's sister, presided over the gang. According to the visiting Frederick Tuckett, "nowhere, perhaps, do twenty Englishmen reside on a spot so comfortless as this naked inaccessible isle".

== See also ==
- List of islands of New Zealand
- List of islands
- Desert island
