= Taieri Plain =

Plain in New Zealand

Coordinates: 45.89°S 170.24°E

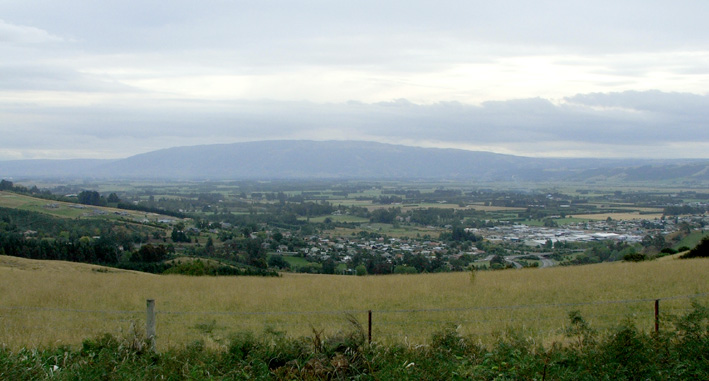
Looking south across the Taieri Plain from above Mosgiel (part of which is visible in the foreground). Maungatua rises above the plain in the distance.

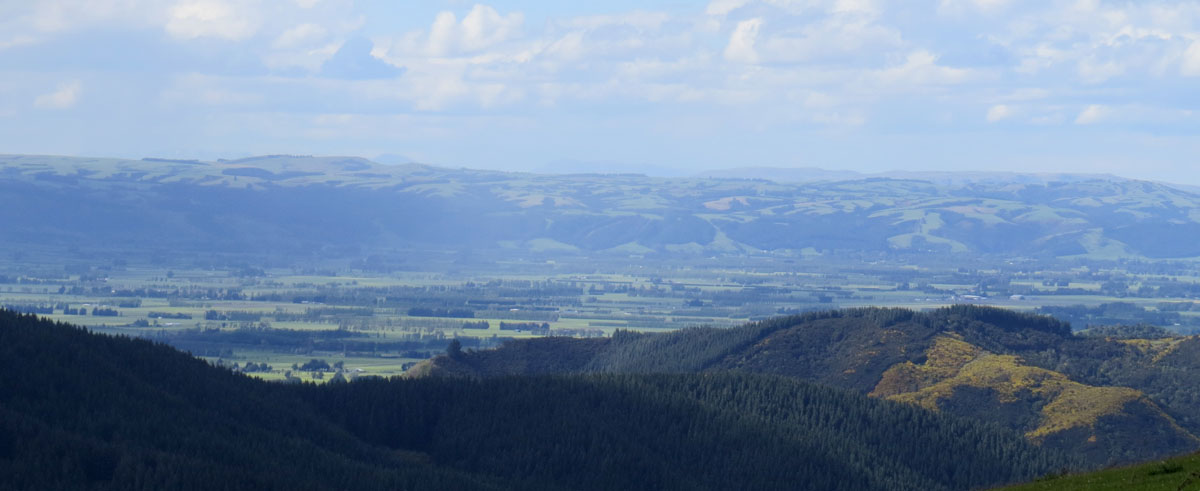
Part of the Taieri Plain as seen from the southeast, in the hills above Lake Waihola

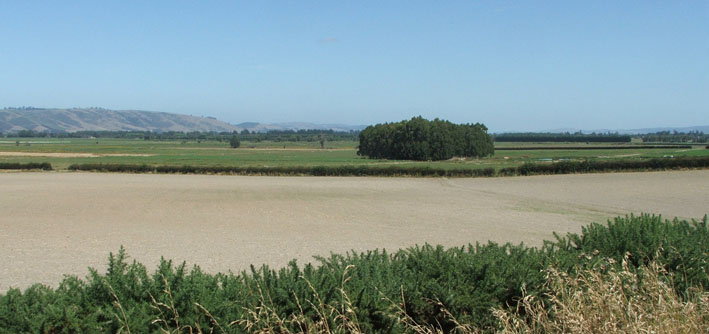
Looking southeast across the Taieri Plain from near Outram.

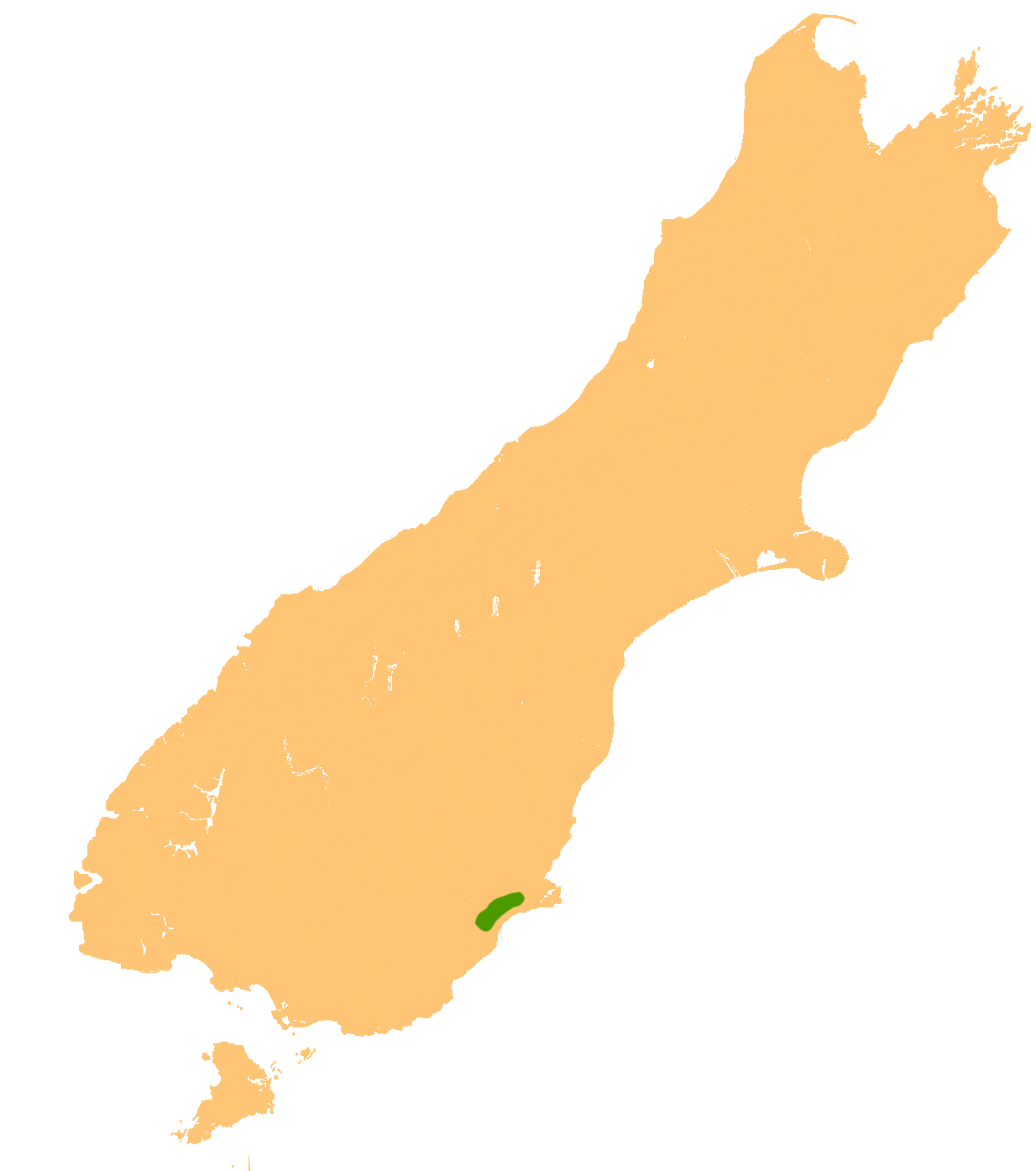
Location of the Taieri Plain in the South Island.

The Taieri Plain (also referred to in the plural as the Taieri Plains) is an area of fertile agricultural land to the southwest of Dunedin, in Otago, New Zealand. The plain covers an area of some 300 square kilometres, with a maximum extent of 30 kilometres. It is not to be confused with Strath Taieri, a second plain of the Taieri River, 40kms to the north beyond Mount Ross.

The floodplain of the Taieri and Waipori Rivers, the plain is enclosed to the west by Maungatua and the Silverpeaks Range, and to the south and east by a low range of coastal hills.

Dairy and sheep farming dominate the agriculture of the plain, although deer farming is starting to have an economic impact. The alluvial nature of the land means that floods are not uncommon, especially in the area around the confluence of the two rivers. Stopbanks protect farmland, houses and Dunedin International Airport at Momona. State Highway 1 crosses parts of the plain along some of the stopbanks, with the result that this stretch of road is known locally as The "Floodfree" Highway.

New Zealand's lowest point, at 2m below sea level, is slightly north of the airport on Kirk's Drain Road, Momona.

To the northeast, the city of Dunedin is separated from the Taieri Plain by a range of rugged hills which are part of the crater of an extinct volcano. At the northeastern limit of the plain lies the town of Mosgiel, officially part of the city of Dunedin. Other settlements and towns on the plain include Outram, Henley, Allanton, and Momona.

To the southwest, a short stretch of rolling hill country separates the Taieri Plain from South Otago's other main lowland areas around the Tokomairaro River and Clutha River. The twin lakes of Waihola and Waipori sit within these hills, as does the Sinclair Wetlands Reserve.
