= Strath Taieri =

Geographic region in New Zealand

Coordinates: 45°24′20.7″S 170°11′0.51″E

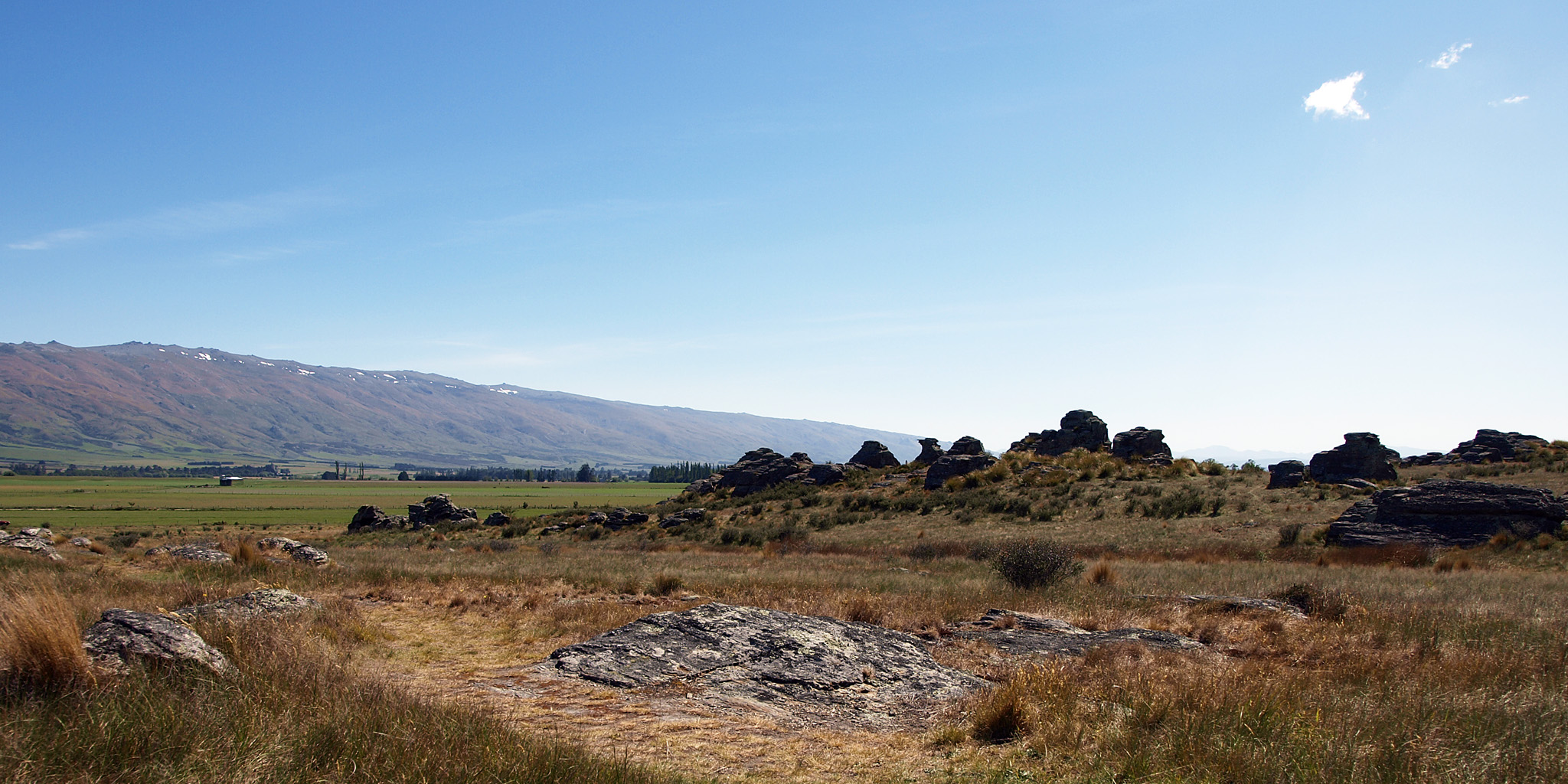
Strath Taieri with Rock and Pillar Range

The Strath Taieri (sometimes spelt Strath-Taieri) is a large glacial valley and river plateau in New Zealand's South Island. It is surrounded by the rugged hill ranges to the north and west of Otago Harbour. Since 1989 it has been part of the city of Dunedin. The small town of Middlemarch is located at its southern end.

The name is a hybrid word, from Strath (anglicised Irish and Scots Gaelic srath), meaning a broad river valley, and the Māori name Taieri (alternative spelling Taiari) of the river which runs through it.

== History ==
=== Early history ===
There is evidence that moa hunters (1300–1500) were once active on the Strath Taieri, the Taieri Gorge, at Deep Stream and Rocklands on the adjacent plateau to the south. A Māori route from the coast to the interior lay along the valley. Activity during the Classic period (1500–1642) is attested by a cave discovered in 1949 with its entrance blocked, containing the bodies of a Māori woman and child. It is not clear if they were trapped deliberately or accidentally. This corresponds with other sites in the area containing rock shelters with mostly domestic articles, wooden bowls, material for garments and gear for hunting weka or fishing. Charles Kettle saw the area from the top of Maungatua in 1847 and was impressed by the land's pastoral potential.

Strath Taieri and its surrounding district lay beyond the limit of the coastal Otago Block which Kettle was surveying but, following the Otago Association's settlement on that land in 1848, horizons became broader. Kettle was one of the first Europeans known to have visited the Strath Taieri when he led an exploration party up the "strath" in February 1851. The Otago Provincial government was established in 1852, whose territory included the region.

It seems Duncan Stewart, his wife and their children were living on the site of what was later the Barewood homestead, on the Barewood run, by late 1853 or early 1854. John Sutton was granted the Barewood Run in 1854 before it was surveyed. Between 1857 and 1859 much of the land in and around Strath Taieri was taken up by pastoralists on lease from the Crown.

One of these leaseholds, Cottesbrook, became the centre of several sheep stations put together by the Tasmanian Gellibrand family. A group of buildings, including a homestead, office, cottage, cook house, butcher's shop and large shearing shed were all built from the local stone. They remain, fine examples of masonry and distinctively Australasian design. A number of the early European settlers came from Tasmania.

=== The gold rush and its aftermath ===
From 1861, the Otago gold rushes saw the development of a stagecoach route, the Dunstan Trail leaving the coastal Taieri Plain near Outram advancing north and west across the plateau south of Strath Taieri proper, through Clark's Junction and on over the Rock and Pillar Range to the Maniototo. A new road north through Strath Taieri was proposed in 1863. In 1864, gold-bearing ground was reported at Hyde at the head of Strath Taieri and now the northern limit of Dunedin. Briefly, there were two thousand people there. Goldfields to the east and north saw the 'middle Taieri valley', as Strath Taieri was sometimes called, surrounded by prospering districts.

Edward Wingfield Humphreys (1841–1892) is credited with naming the valley 'Strath Taieri'. Alice Humphreys (née Hawdon, 1848–1934) moved to her husband's property in the "strath" soon after their marriage in 1869. She is credited with calling the private township laid out on their property 'Middlemarch' after George Eliot's novel. However, this origin of the name has been disputed. From whatever source it got its name, the private township of Middlemarch on Humphrey's property of Garthmyl had been surveyed on land adjoining the projected railway and several sections were already sold by 6 November 1880. A stone house was built and occupied by Mr. Kirk and his family by the winter of 1881. By 1891, there was a hotel, eight houses, two blacksmith shops, two stores, a school and twenty tents occupied by workers building the railway.

Following the abolition of the New Zealand provinces in 1876 the Taieri County was formed, whose Deep Stream Riding included Strath Taieri. The county improved the road traversing the plateau from the Taieri Plain, building a bridge over Deep Stream in 1880, a suspension bridge over the Taieri River at Sutton in 1885, and the same year another over the Taieri linking Middlemarch with the Cottesbrook station. The Sutton Stream, south of the township, was bridged in 1884. There was a long pause before the 'centre road', now state highway 87, was extended north to Hyde and the Maniototo.

Construction of the Otago Central Railway from the South Island's main trunk line, which lay along the coast, began in 1879. Its route was projected to cross the Taieri Plain and follow the Taieri Gorge upstream to Strath Taieri, which it would then traverse from south to north as the main route to Central Otago. The gorge presented formidable obstacles, to which the existing bridges and tunnels are now picturesque testimony. The line reached Middlemarch in April 1891, spurring the township's development. It was extended to Hyde on 16 July 1894, where it had a similar effect. The line's eventual terminus was Cromwell in the Upper Clutha catchment, but it did not arrive there until 1921.

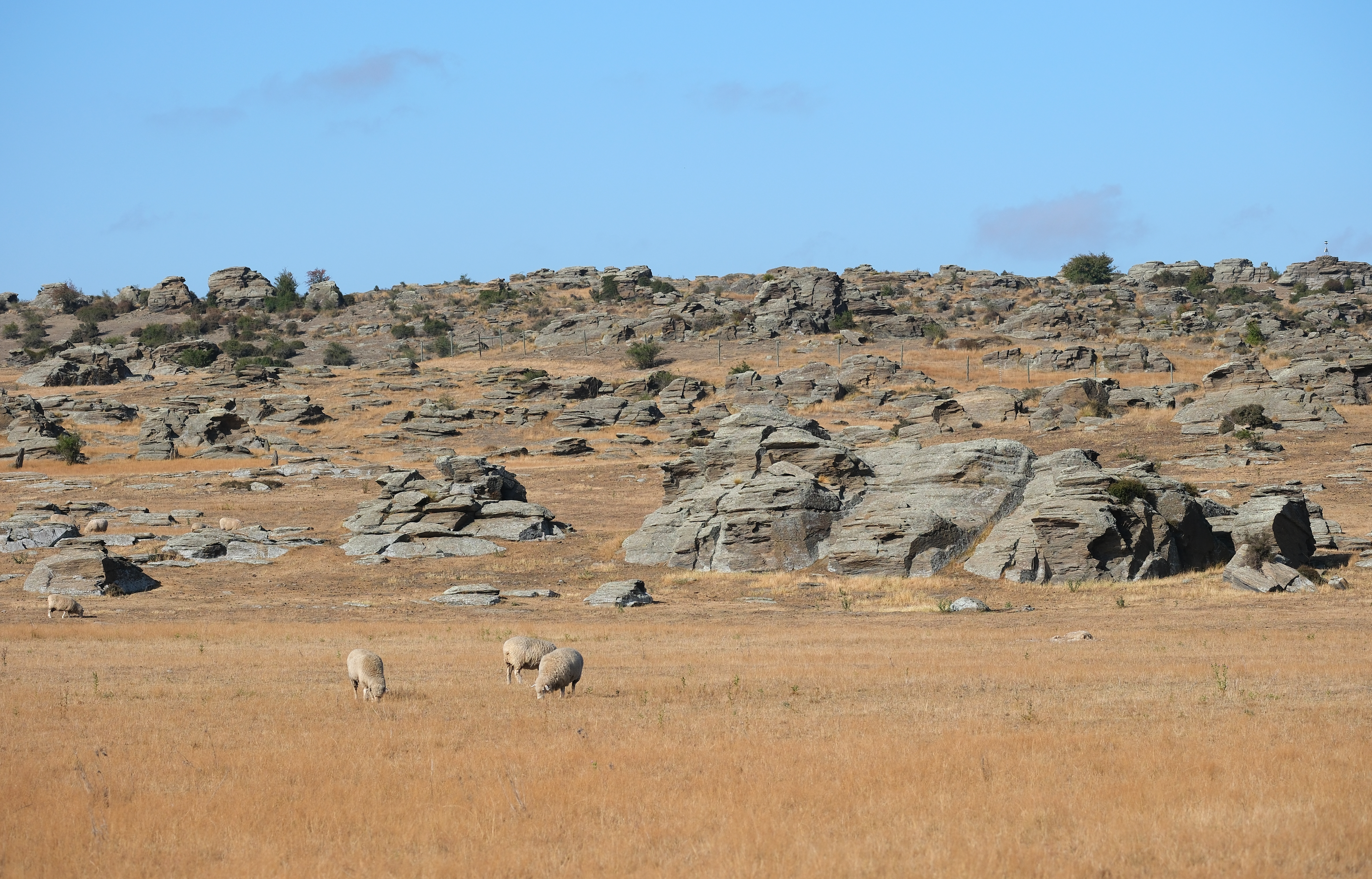
Schist is prominent in the hills surrounding Strath Taieri

To develop Middlemarch the March Creek had been diverted and for many years the township was regularly flooded until channel work on the creek ameliorated the problem. A Presbyterian preacher covered the Strath Taieri district in 1886. Anglican and Roman Catholic churches were built in 1901 and a handsome church of the local schist stone was completed for the Presbyterians in 1906.

=== Twentieth century and beyond ===
Gold mining in nearby areas such as Macraes Flat and Nenthorn buoyed up the development of the Strath Taieri and its townships, but that stalled in the twentieth century. In the 1880s, rabbits became a plague, and it was only by strenuous efforts this was contained by the 1940s. Runs were broken up for closer settlement in 1894 and later, but the valley remained thinly populated. In 1914, there was a move to have the Strath Taieri Riding transferred to the Maniototo County, which was unsuccessful. In the 1930s, attempts to get a water supply for Middlemarch were also unsuccessful. However, an electricity supply to Middlemarch was made operative on 28 July 1939.

On 4 June 1943, the derailment of the Dunedin Cromwell Express on the outskirts of Hyde cost twenty-one lives. Because the accident was attributed to the negligence of the engine driver, the government became liable for more than £200,000 in compensation. The modern equivalent would be several million dollars. Postwar development was slow and while farm production increased, the population expanded only a little and latterly declined.

As the 20th century advanced, this large and apparently empty country maintained the character and atmosphere of a pioneering district. Middlemarch could seem to visitors like a set for 'High Noon'. The plateau country to the south, with its fantastic rock formations, tors, heightens the impression of antiquity and otherworldliness which inspired artistic responses. Until 1948, Antimony was mined at Hindon.

The celebrated New Zealand painter Colin McCahon as a schoolboy in 1936, had what he later described as a 'vision' looking westward from a point on the coastal hills over the Taieri Plain apparently to the plateau country south of the Strath Taieri proper. He later said his art had been an attempt to communicate this vision. He described it as seeing a landscape 'standing far from the sun of Egypt in the Otago cold.' He called it a 'landscape of splendour and order and peace', which he conceived as a pre-Biblical place. In 1945, his younger and also celebrated Otago contemporary, the poet James K. Baxter, wrote 'Upon the upland road/Ride easy, stranger:/Surrender to the sky/Your heart of anger.' The lines certainly capture the effect on some people of the experience of crossing the plateau, approaching the Strath Taieri by road from the south.

That landscape became greener in the 1960s and 1970s as native tussock was converted to European pasture, a process protested in the works of the artist Marilynn Webb. But the postwar prosperity of farming ended in the 1970s. In October 1977, the Taieri County was merged with its northern neighbour, Waikouaiti County, thus Strath Taieri became part of the new The Silverpeaks County surrounding Dunedin and its boroughs in an inland arc. Rural recession intensified and in 1989 The Silverpeaks County was merged into a new, much enlarged, City of Dunedin. In 1990, the Central Otago Railway was closed and the line from Clyde back to Middlemarch soon uplifted. Nevertheless, a tourist train service was being operated from Dunedin to Strath Taieri by way of the Taieri Gorge on the remaining part of the line. Since 1991 this has been run by the Taieri Gorge Railway Limited owned by the Dunedin City Council. In 1993, the course of the track further inland was opened as the Otago Central Rail Trail for hikers and cyclists, by the Department of Conservation. Both have proved successful in attracting visitors.

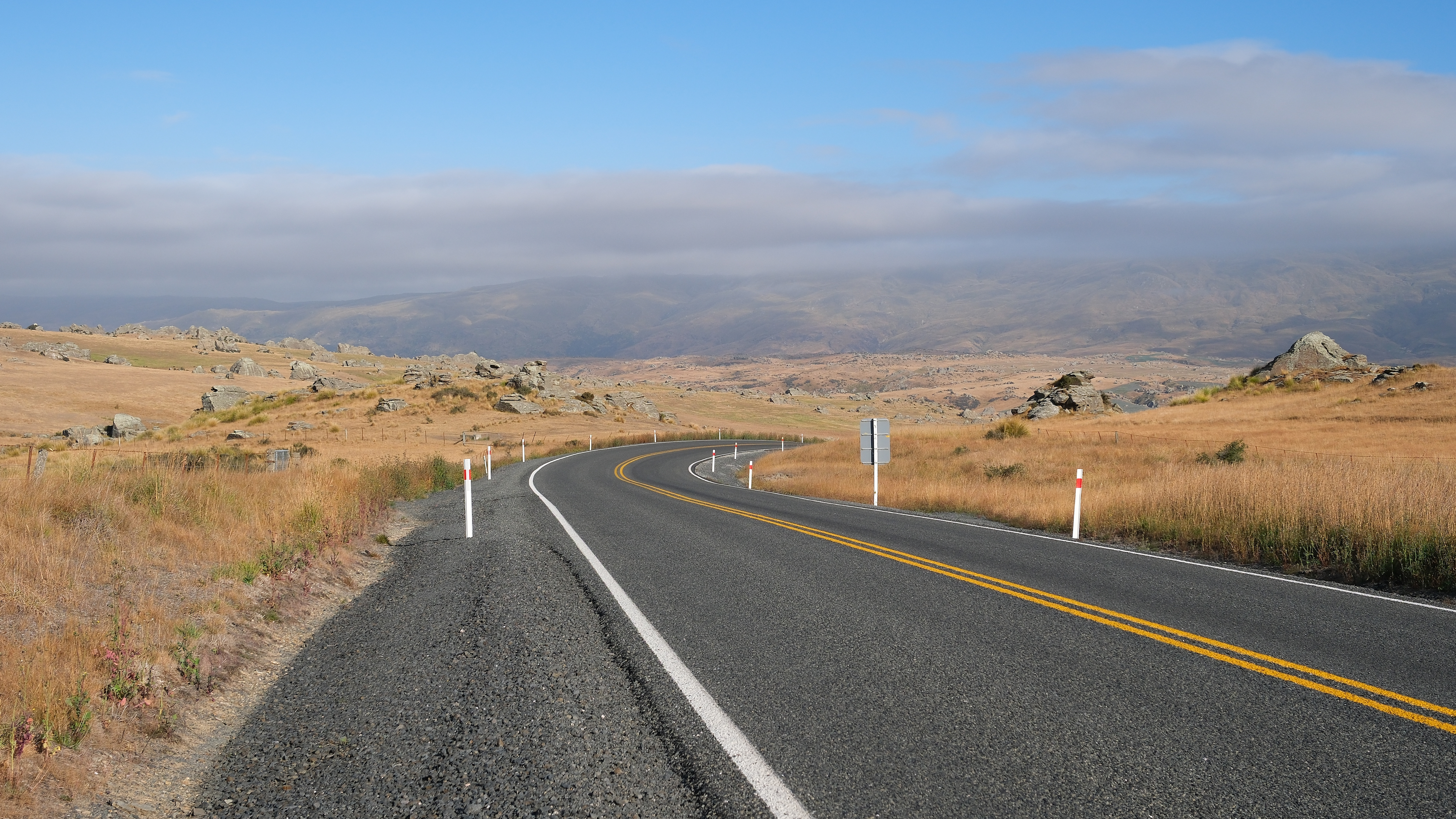
State Highway 87 entering the southern end of Strath Taieri

As a farming district, strategically located but isolated by geographical barriers, Strath Taieri's development turned on changes in farming and transport until the late 20th century. While the closure of the through railway saw the end of that means of moving heavy goods between the coast and the interior, the completion of the tar sealing of State Highway 87, in 1996, was the effective provision of another. With the growth of tourism, much of it motor-vehicle-based, this, with the rail trail and tourist rail services, has added a new element to the mix.

The rural, pioneering atmosphere of the district was perhaps responsible for the unexpected success of its bachelor dances, recently promoted ostensibly to find partners for its single men. That, and the emergence of New Zealand's iconic Southern Man may have led to the event's attracting visitors from around the country and overseas. Apparently, few marriages have resulted, but Strath Taieri has become known to many more people.

== Demographics ==
The statistical area of Strath Taieri, which includes Middlemarch, covers 2,115.02 km^{2} (816.61 sq mi) and had an estimated population of 700 as of June 2025, with a population density of 0.33 people per km^{2}.

Historical population
Year	Pop.	±% p.a.
2006	714	—
2013	714	+0.00%
2018	666	−1.38%

Strath Taieri had a population of 666 at the 2018 New Zealand census, a decrease of 48 people (−6.7%) since the 2013 census, and a decrease of 48 people (−6.7%) since the 2006 census. There were 267 households, comprising 369 males and 300 females, giving a sex ratio of 1.23 males per female. The median age was 43.0 years (compared with 37.4 years nationally), with 135 people (20.3%) aged under 15 years, 84 (12.6%) aged 15 to 29, 366 (55.0%) aged 30 to 64, and 84 (12.6%) aged 65 or older.

Ethnicities were 95.5% European/Pākehā, 9.9% Māori, 0.5% Pasifika, and 1.8% other ethnicities. People may identify with more than one ethnicity.

The percentage of people born overseas was 6.8, compared with 27.1% nationally.

Although some people chose not to answer the census's question about religious affiliation, 56.3% had no religion, and 36.5% were Christian.

Of those at least 15 years old, 84 (15.8%) people had a bachelor's or higher degree, and 90 (16.9%) people had no formal qualifications. The median income was $34,700, compared with $31,800 nationally. 69 people (13.0%) earned over $70,000 compared to 17.2% nationally. The employment status of those at least 15 was that 297 (55.9%) people were employed full-time, 93 (17.5%) were part-time, and 18 (3.4%) were unemployed.

== Education ==
In 2021, there is one primary school in the Strath Taieri District, at Middlemarch. There were several schools in earlier times.
