= Waipori River =

River in Otago, New Zealand

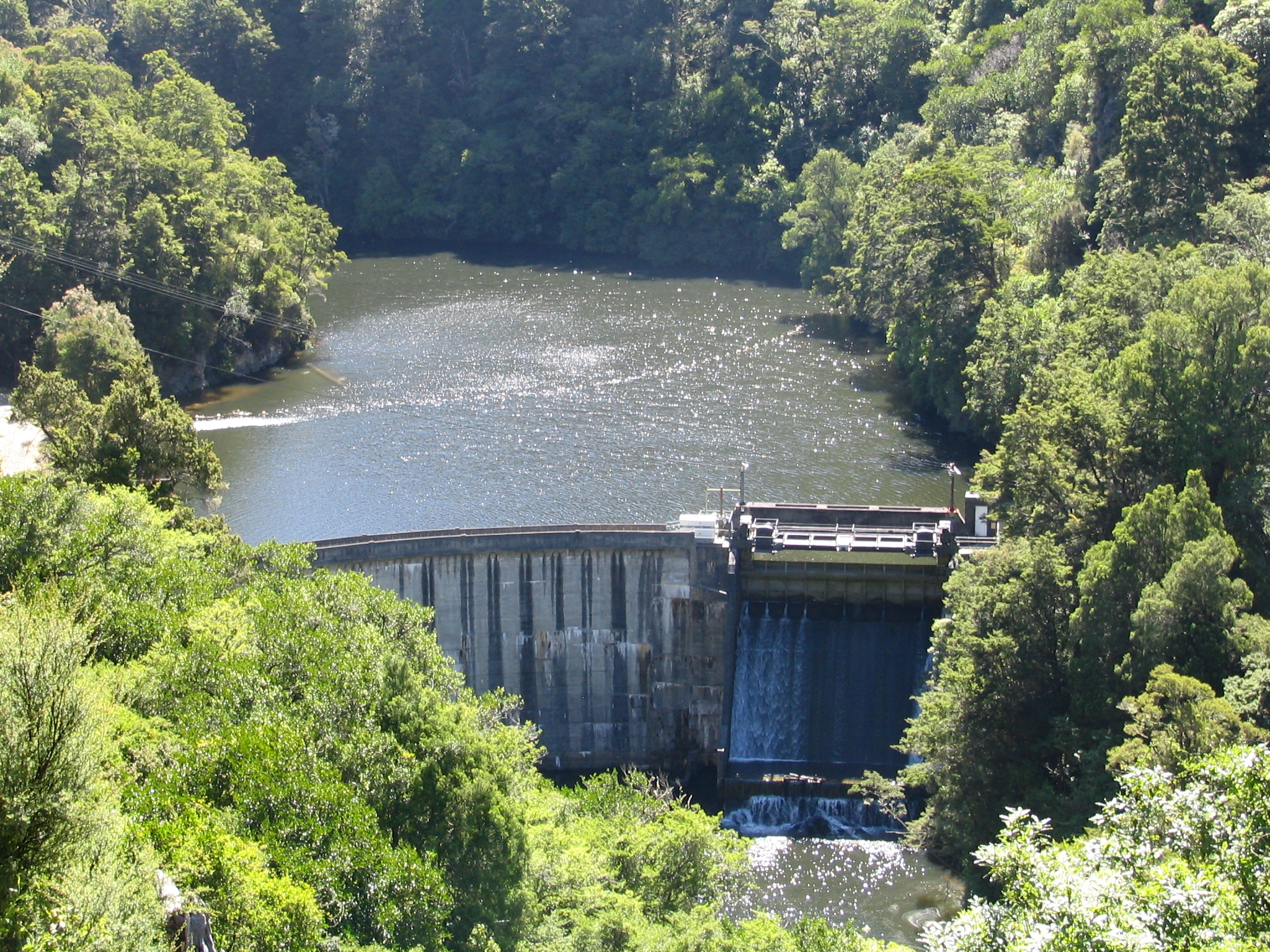
- One of several dams on the Waipori River
- Route of the Waipori River
- Mouth of the Waipori River Waipori River (South Island)

Location
- Country: New Zealand

Physical characteristics
- Source
  - coordinates: 45°49′43″S 169°44′21″E
- Mouth
  - location: Taieri River
  - coordinates: 45°59′32″S 170°08′42″E

Basin features
- Progression: Waipori River → Taieri River → Pacific Ocean
- Tributaries
  - left: Deep Creek, Burnt Creek, Stony Creek, Mill Creek, Contour Channel, Bull Creek
  - right: Shepherd Stream, Dowdle Creek
- Waterfalls: Waipori Falls

The Waipori River is a river in Otago in the South Island of New Zealand. Rising in the Lammerlaw Range, it flows southeast for 50 kilometres (31 mi) before joining the Taieri River near Henley, 30 kilometres (19 mi) southwest of Dunedin of which it is officially the southernmost border.

The upper reaches of the Waipori flow through rough hill country, much of it covered by the Berwick Forest. An artificial lake, Lake Mahinerangi is formed on the river behind a small hydroelectric station at Waipori Falls, which was built in 1880 to provide power for the city of Dunedin. Much of this area is within the Waipori Falls Scenic Reserve.

The lower reaches of the river pass through an area of wetlands around Lakes Waihola and Waipori, both of which drain into the river. This area is a habitat for many species of wading birds. The Sinclair Wetlands reserve is located in this area.

The name Waipori comes from Māori words meaning "dark water".

The four power stations (Waipori 1A, 2A, 3 and 4) have a maximum capacity of 87 MW, with an annual generation of 189 GWh. They are owned and operated by Manawa Energy (formerly Trustpower).
