= Deep Stream =

River in Otago, New Zealand

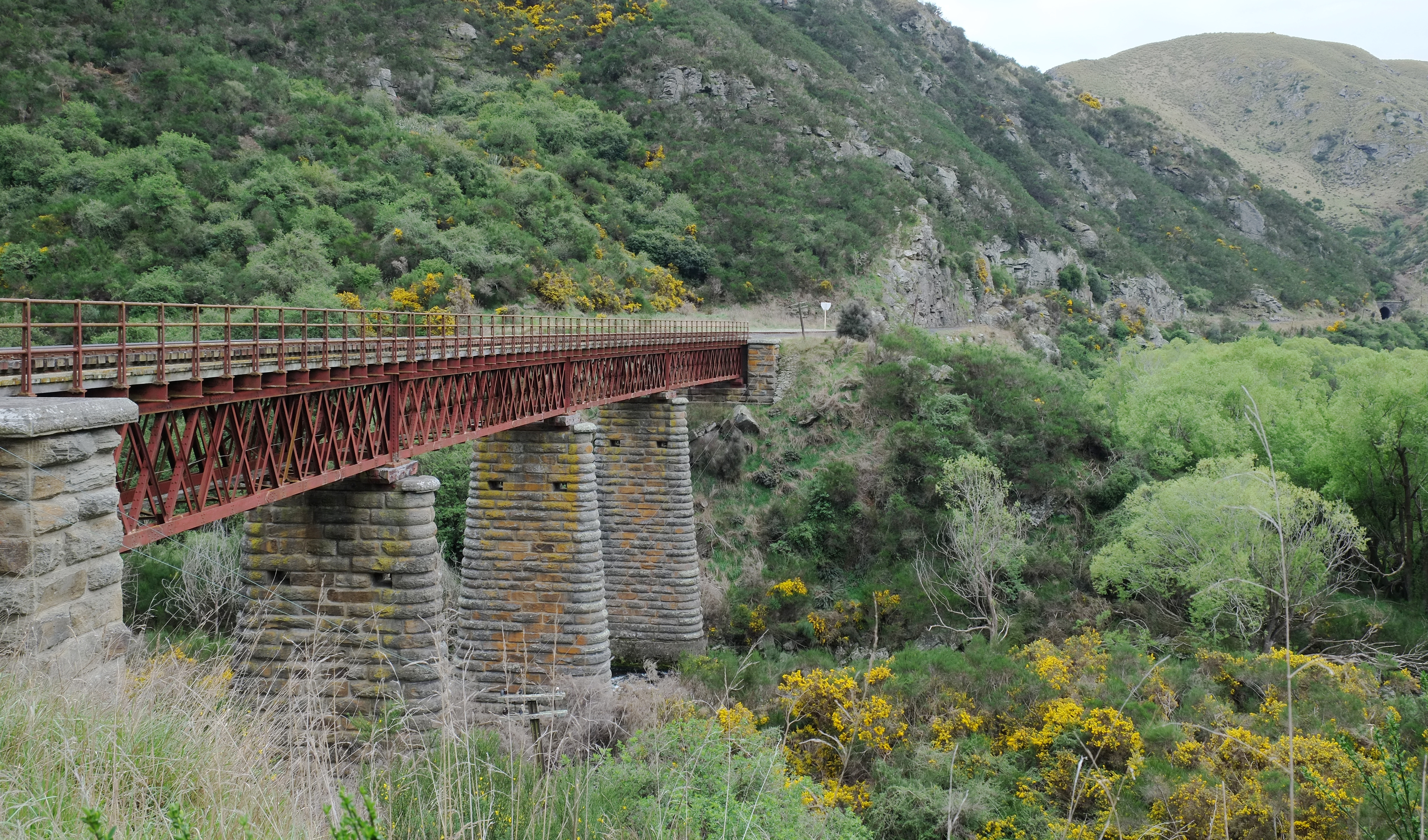
- Deep Stream Viaduct of the Taieri Gorge Railway, near the mouth of Deep Stream as it enters the Taieri River
- Route of Deep Stream
- Mouth of Deep Stream Deep Stream (South Island)

Location
- Country: New Zealand

Physical characteristics
- Source: Lammerlaw Range
  - coordinates: 45°42′30″S 169°44′46″E
  - elevation: 1,125 m (3,691 ft)
- Mouth
  - location: Taieri River
  - coordinates: 45°42′07″S 170°18′18″E
  - elevation: 75 m (246 ft)
- Length: 70 km (43 mi)

Basin features
- Progression: Deep Stream → Taieri River → Pacific Ocean
- Tributaries
  - left: Deep Creek, Shannon Stream
  - right: Devils Creek, Barbours Stream, Clarkes Stream, Pegleg Stream, Boyds Creek
- Bridges: Deep Stream Viaduct

Deep Stream is a tributary of the Taieri River in Otago, New Zealand. The stream runs generally eastwards for some 70 kilometres from its source on the slopes of Lammerlaw in the Lammerlaw Range (at 45°42′55″S 169°44′15″E), reaching the Taieri River near Hindon in the Taieri Gorge.

A railway junction was located at the junction of the Deep Stream and the Taieri, also called Deep Stream, which was on the Otago Central Railway. The line is still used by Dunedin Railways, but the station was closed in 1954 and no longer exists.

Trout fishing with grasshoppers was popular on the stream.

The stream shares its name with several other much shorter streams in the Canterbury and Southland Regions of New Zealand.
