= Lake Mahinerangi =

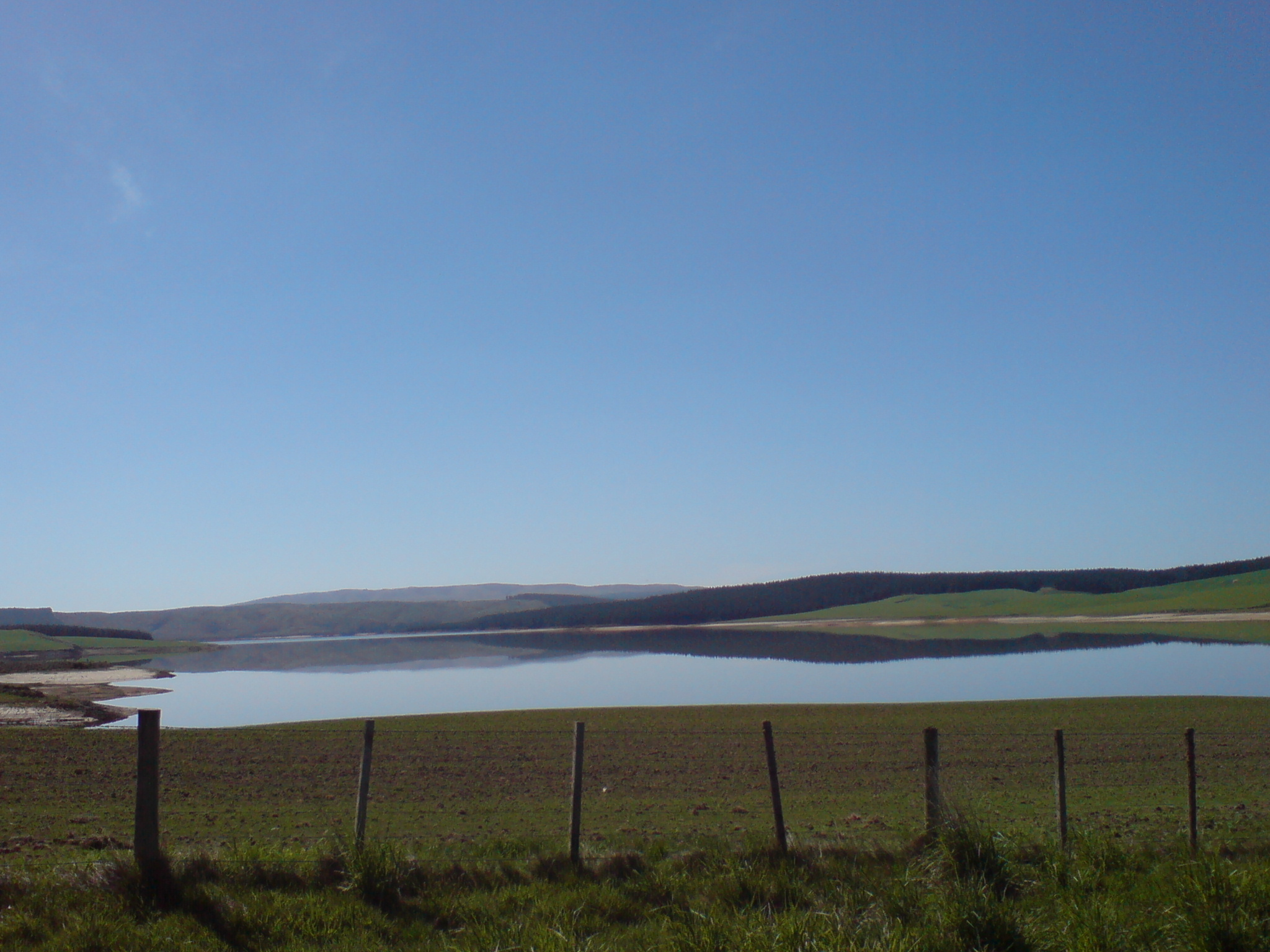
- Lake Mahinerangi

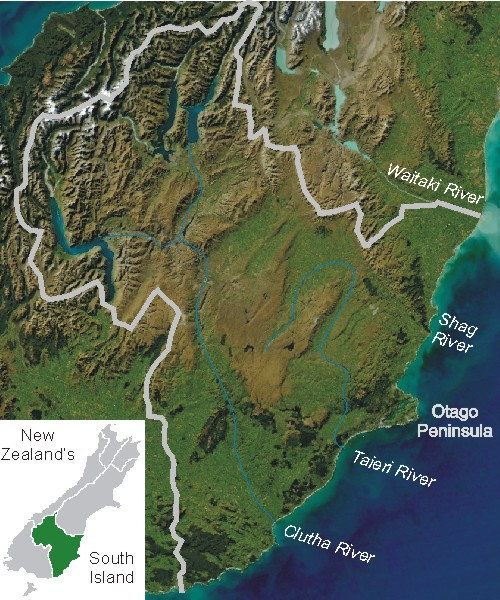
- Location within Otago peninsula
- Location: Clutha District, Otago Region, South Island
- Coordinates: 45°52′S 169°57′E
- Lake type: reservoir
- Basin countries: New Zealand
- Max. length: 12 km (7.5 mi)

Lake Mahinerangi is a lake in Otago formed when a dam was built on the Waipori River for hydroelectric generation. The lake is 35 kilometres (22 mi) to the west of Dunedin in New Zealand's South Island. Construction of the dam started in 1903 and since 1907, power has been produced.

== Naming ==
The lake was named on 17 May 1911 for Olive Mahinerangi Burnett, daughter of William Burnett, who was mayor of Dunedin in 1911. Burnett's wife was Māori and their daughter's middle name means "white daughter of heaven". The lake has a maximum length of 12 kilometres (7.5 mi), and lies on the western side of Maungatua, above and to the west of the Berwick Forest. It is surrounded by farmland, tussock grasslands, and plantation forest.

== Hydro-electric development ==
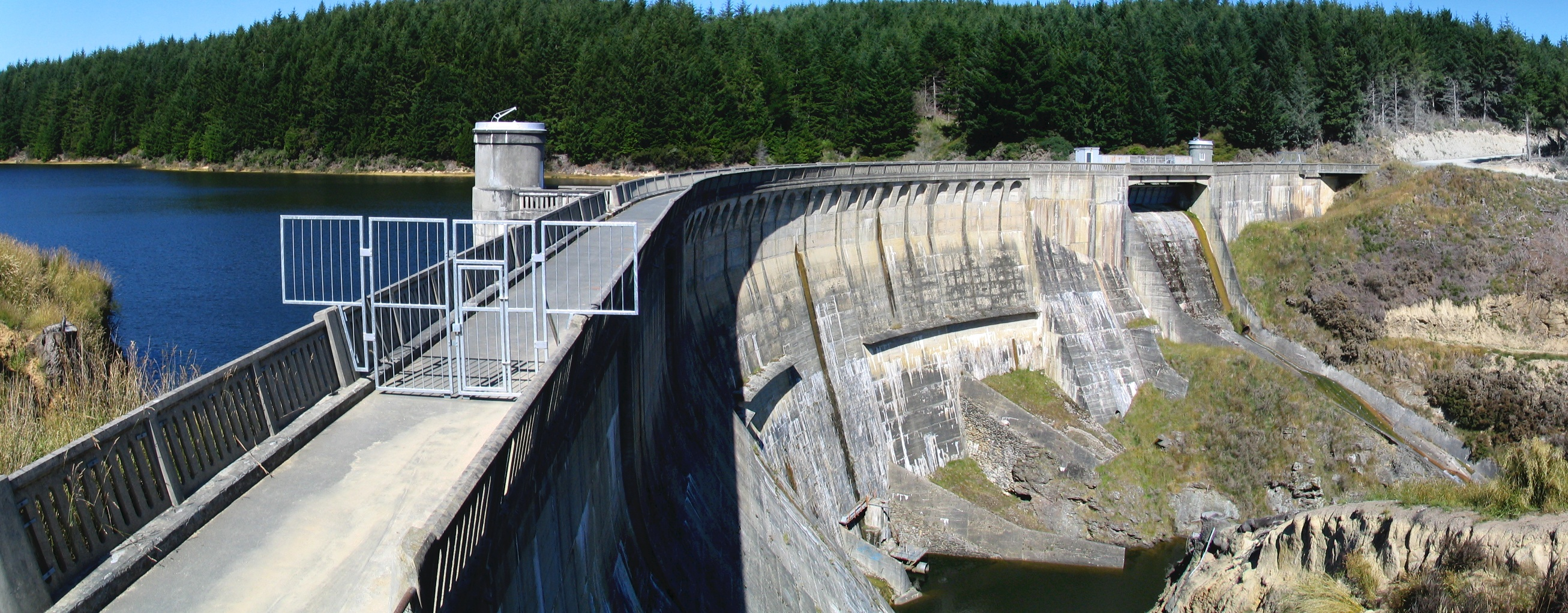
Mahinerangi Dam

The tributaries of the Waipori River are in the Lammerlaw Range. The river descends gradually until the Waipori Gorge, where it suddenly drops 222 metres (728 ft) in approximately 4,000 metres (13,000 ft). This makes the gorge an ideal site for a hydro-electric scheme. The first proposals to develop the river for hydro-electric generation were prepared in 1900, for powering gold mining dredges. However, the plans were eventually altered to supply power to Dunedin city and surrounding districts. Construction began in early 1903.

The generating plant commenced operation on 27 April 1907. Electricity was transmitted to Halfway Bush substation in Dunedin via two 33 kV lines. However, there was no storage built into the original scheme, and in the first year of operation, low flows in the river led to constraints on the generating capacity. Between 1907 and 1913, some storage lakes were created on tributaries, including an early concrete arch dam on Pioneer Creek.

There was opposition from gold mining interests that blocked the development of storage capacity on the Waipori River itself, because Waipori Flat was still being actively mined. In 1920, the Dunedin City Corporation Empowering Act was successfully pushed through Parliament, against opposition from mining interests, to enable the use of the Waipori River as a hydro-electric reservoir.

The first dam was built in 1923, and later raised, but ultimately had to be abandoned because of inadequate foundations. A second Empowering Act of 1924 enabled another dam to be built further downstream, with work beginning in 1927, and completing in 1931. Lake Mahinerangi was formed by this new 20.4-metre (67 ft) high dam, and an additional powerhouse of 3,000 kilowatts (4,000 hp) capacity was commissioned. The new lake submerged the mining township of Waipori.

The Mahinerangi Dam was completed to its final height of 33.5 metres (110 ft) in 1946. By 1955, two more generating stations had been built downstream from the original powerhouse. There have been further replacements and additions to generating capacity between the 1960s and 1980s.

The Waipori hydro-electric scheme includes a network of four dams and power stations and produces a maximum output of 84 megawatts (113,000 hp).

== Arms ==
At the southern end, the lake has two major arms, called Loch Luella and Loch Loudon.

== Fishing ==
The lake is well stocked with brown trout and some perch. The elevation is nearly 2,000 feet (610 m) and the lake can be very windswept and cold, which makes the fishery best suited to the warmer months.

== Wind farm ==
Trustpower's Mahinerangi Wind Farm is located to the north of the lake.

== Climate ==
Climate data for Mahinerangi Dam , elevation 396 m (1,299 ft), (1981–2010)
Month	Jan	Feb	Mar	Apr	May	Jun	Jul	Aug	Sep	Oct	Nov	Dec	Year
Mean daily maximum °C (°F)	18.5 (65.3)	17.9 (64.2)	16.2 (61.2)	13.8 (56.8)	10.6 (51.1)	8.1 (46.6)	7.4 (45.3)	8.9 (48.0)	11.6 (52.9)	13.4 (56.1)	15.1 (59.2)	16.5 (61.7)	13.2 (55.7)
Daily mean °C (°F)	13.3 (55.9)	12.9 (55.2)	11.4 (52.5)	9.2 (48.6)	6.5 (43.7)	4.5 (40.1)	3.4 (38.1)	4.7 (40.5)	6.7 (44.1)	8.4 (47.1)	10.0 (50.0)	11.6 (52.9)	8.5 (47.4)
Mean daily minimum °C (°F)	8.2 (46.8)	8.0 (46.4)	6.5 (43.7)	4.7 (40.5)	2.5 (36.5)	0.8 (33.4)	−0.7 (30.7)	0.4 (32.7)	1.9 (35.4)	3.4 (38.1)	5.0 (41.0)	6.8 (44.2)	4.0 (39.1)
Average rainfall mm (inches)	81.7 (3.22)	76.0 (2.99)	80.4 (3.17)	71.9 (2.83)	117.5 (4.63)	96.8 (3.81)	95.6 (3.76)	78.4 (3.09)	70.7 (2.78)	87.1 (3.43)	64.7 (2.55)	100.1 (3.94)	1,020.9 (40.2)
Source: NIWA (rain 1971–2000)
