= Lammerlaw Range =

Mountain range in New Zealand

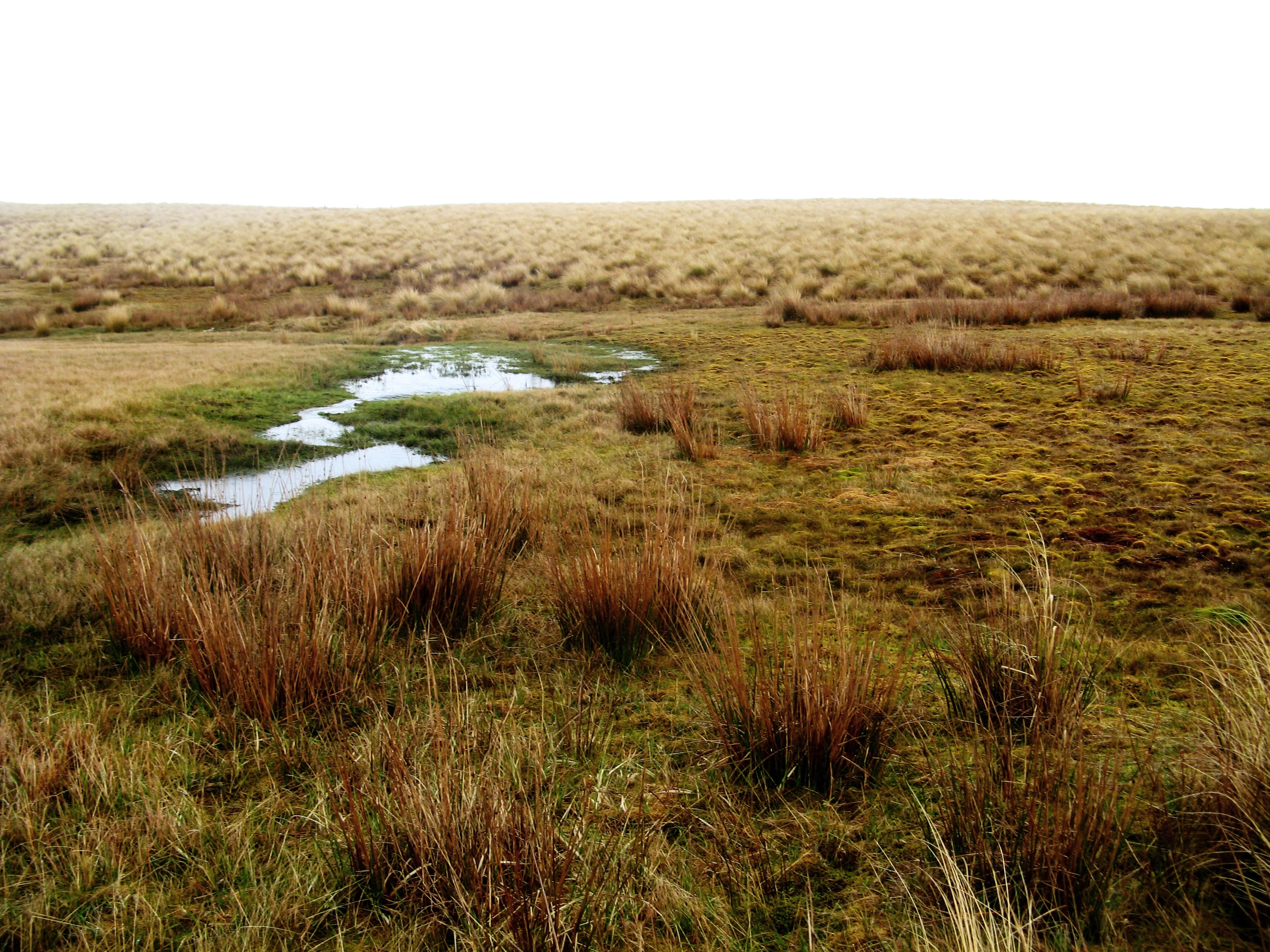
- Habitat of Eldon's galaxias (a fish) in the range

Highest point
- Peak: Lammerlaw Top
- Elevation: 1,210 m (3,970 ft)
- Coordinates: 45.65891°S 169.63850°E

Geography
- Location of the Lammerlaw Range
- Location: South Island, New Zealand
- Range coordinates: 45°44′S 169°44′E

The Lammerlaw Range is in the Otago region of New Zealand. It is an important watershed, and the source of many of the tributaries in the Taieri and lower Clutha River systems. The origins of the placename are Scottish. Windfarms have been sited in the area. The area includes distinctive geology including ribbon fens and peat habitats. The Lammerlaw and, adjacent to the northeast, Lammermoor Ranges also include tussock grasslands. Parts of the ranges are in Te Papanui Conservation Park. The endangered Eldon's galaxias (Galaxias eldoni) is found in the range.

The area was captured by aerial photography in 1949.

== Peaks ==
Named Peaks in Lammerlaw Range
Name	Height	Coordinates
Lammerlaw Top	1,250 metres (4,100 ft)	45.08013°S 170.39206°E
Lammerlaw Rock	1,167 m (3,829 ft)	45.65618°S 169.62755°E

== See also ==
- Protected areas of New Zealand
- Conservation parks of New Zealand
