= Te Papanui Conservation Park =

- Interactive map of Te Papanui Conservation Park
- Location: Otago Region, New Zealand
- Coordinates: 45.6411143°S 169.5899834°E
- Opened: 2003

Te Papanui Conservation Park is a mainland island in the Otago Region of New Zealand.

It is managed by the Department of Conservation, and opened in its current form in March 2003.

== See also ==
- Mainland islands
