= Taieri River =

River in New Zealand

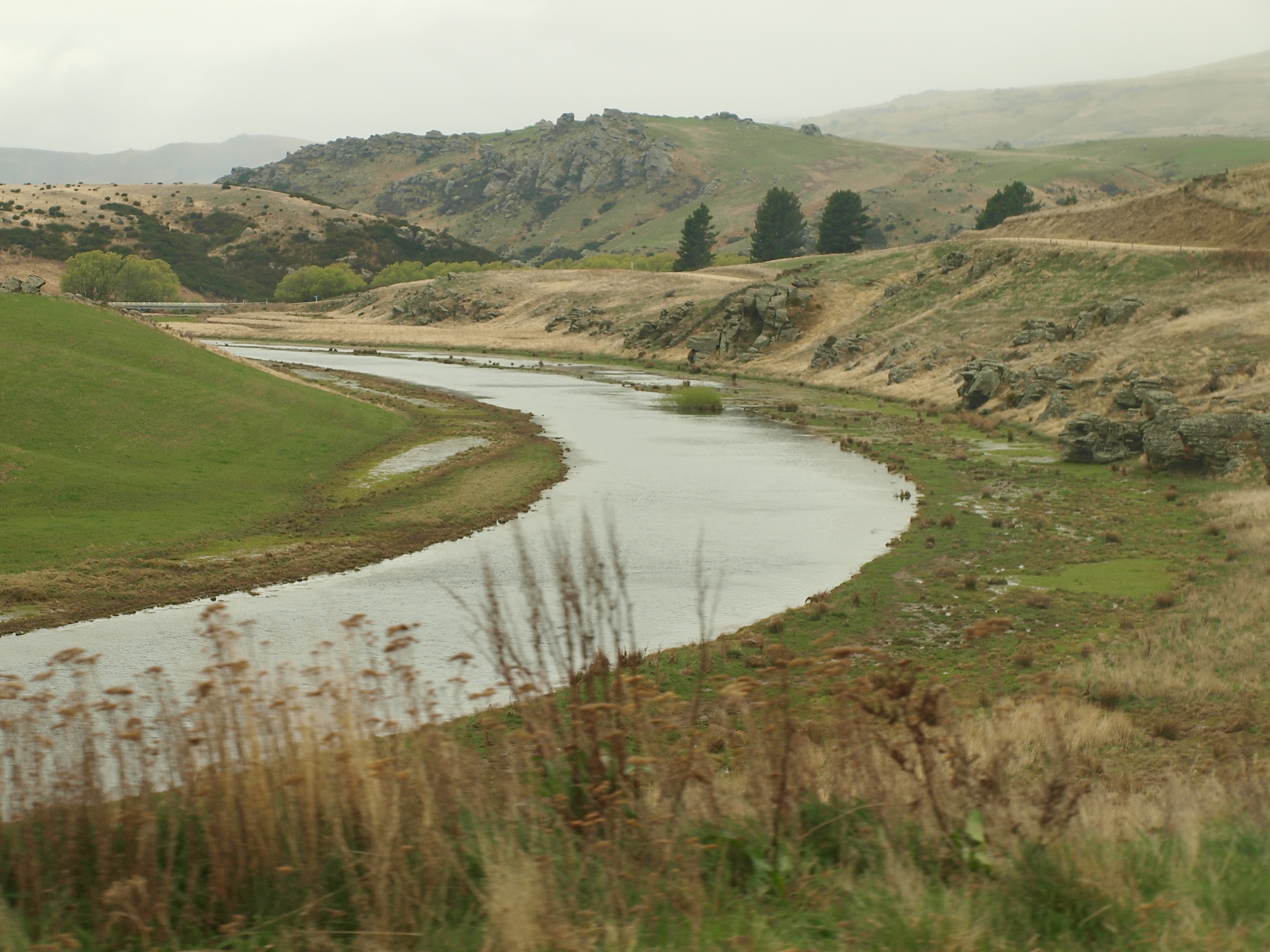
- The Upper Taieri River, Otago
- Route of the Taieri River
- Mouth of the Taieri River Taieri River (South Island)

Location
- Country: New Zealand

Physical characteristics
- Source: Lammerlaw Range
  - coordinates: 45°42′39″S 169°41′38″E
- Mouth
  - location: Pacific Ocean
  - coordinates: 46°03′15″S 170°11′59″E
  - elevation: 0 m (0 ft)
- Length: 288 km (179 mi)

Basin features
- Progression: Taieri River → Pacific Ocean
- Tributaries
  - left: MacKays Creek, Red Swamp Creek, Bullocky Creek, Canadian Creek, Riddles Creek, Serpentine Creek, Linn Burn, Totara Creek, Stony Creek, Waitoi Creek, Stot Burn, Gimmer Burn, Eden Creek, Ewe Burn, Hog Burn, Kye Burn, Swin Burn, Hound Burn, Horse Burn, Mare Burn, Filly Burn, Crater Creek, Sheepwash Creek, Nenthorn Stream, Ross Stream, Three O'clock Stream, Christmas Creek, Little Mount Allan Stream, Big Stream, Mullocky Stream, Silver Stream, Ōwhiro Stream, Surprise Stream
  - right: Elbow Creek, Ailsa Creek, Spillers Creek, Logan Burn, Styx Creek, Rock and Pillar Creek, Sow Burn, Pig Burn, Shepherds Hut Creek, Bennetts Creek, Cap Burn, Prices Creek, Coal Creek, Scrub Burn, Homestead Creek, Six Mile Creek, Annetts Creek, Boundary Creek, Gills Creek, Heaney Creek, House Creek, Last Creek, Nant Creek, Wandle Creek, Lug Creek, Six Mile Creek, Camlet Creek, Dewar Stream, Rock Creek, Deadbullock Creek, Sutton Stream, Castle Stream, Flat Stream, Barewood Creek, Deep Stream, Machine Creek, Pay Office Creek, Game Cock Stream, Lee Stream, Traquair Burn, Waipori River
- Bridges: Hyde-Macraes Bridge, Taieri Mouth Bridge

The Taieri River (a misspelling of the original Māori name Taiari) is the fourth-longest river in New Zealand and is in Otago in the South Island. Rising in the Lammerlaw Range, it initially flows north, then east around the Rock and Pillar range before turning southeast, reaching the sea 30 kilometres (19 mi) south of Dunedin.

The upper reaches meander in a series of convoluted loops across a floodplain above Paerau, close to the aptly named locality of Serpentine; the river has created many small oxbow lakes in this area, some of which have been converted into water meadows. From here the river runs through two small hydroelectric power stations before reaching Patearoa in The Maniototo. The Taieri then arcs through almost 180 degrees, entering a broad glacial valley (the Strath-Taieri) surrounded by rugged hill ranges. Immediately downstream the river has cut a steep-sided declivity, the Taieri Gorge. This is known for the Taieri Gorge Railway, which follows a route into Central Otago through it. In the Taieri's lower reaches there is a broad floodplain (the Taieri Plains) containing much of Otago's most fertile farmland. The river then flows through the lower Taieri Gorge to the Pacific Ocean at Taieri Mouth. Taieri Island lies in the Pacific Ocean several hundred metres from the mouth of the river.

The Taieri is 288 kilometres (179 mi) long, of which the last 20 kilometres (12 mi) are navigable. Despite its length the Taieri has a minimal amount of water volume compared to other New Zealand rivers with its average discharge being around 35 cubic metres per second (1,200 cu ft/s). Towns along the river include Middlemarch, Outram, Allanton, Mosgiel, Henley, and Taieri Mouth. Its major tributary is the Waipori River, which meets the Taieri near Henley on the Taieri Plains. Google Maps erroneously shows the stretch of the river from the confluence to the mouth as Waipori River. The official correct name is shown on the New Zealand government's official NZ Topo Map.

However, while Taieri is the official name of the river, this name is known to be a misspelling of the Te Reo Māori word Taiari, meaning spring tide or shining water.

== Gallery ==
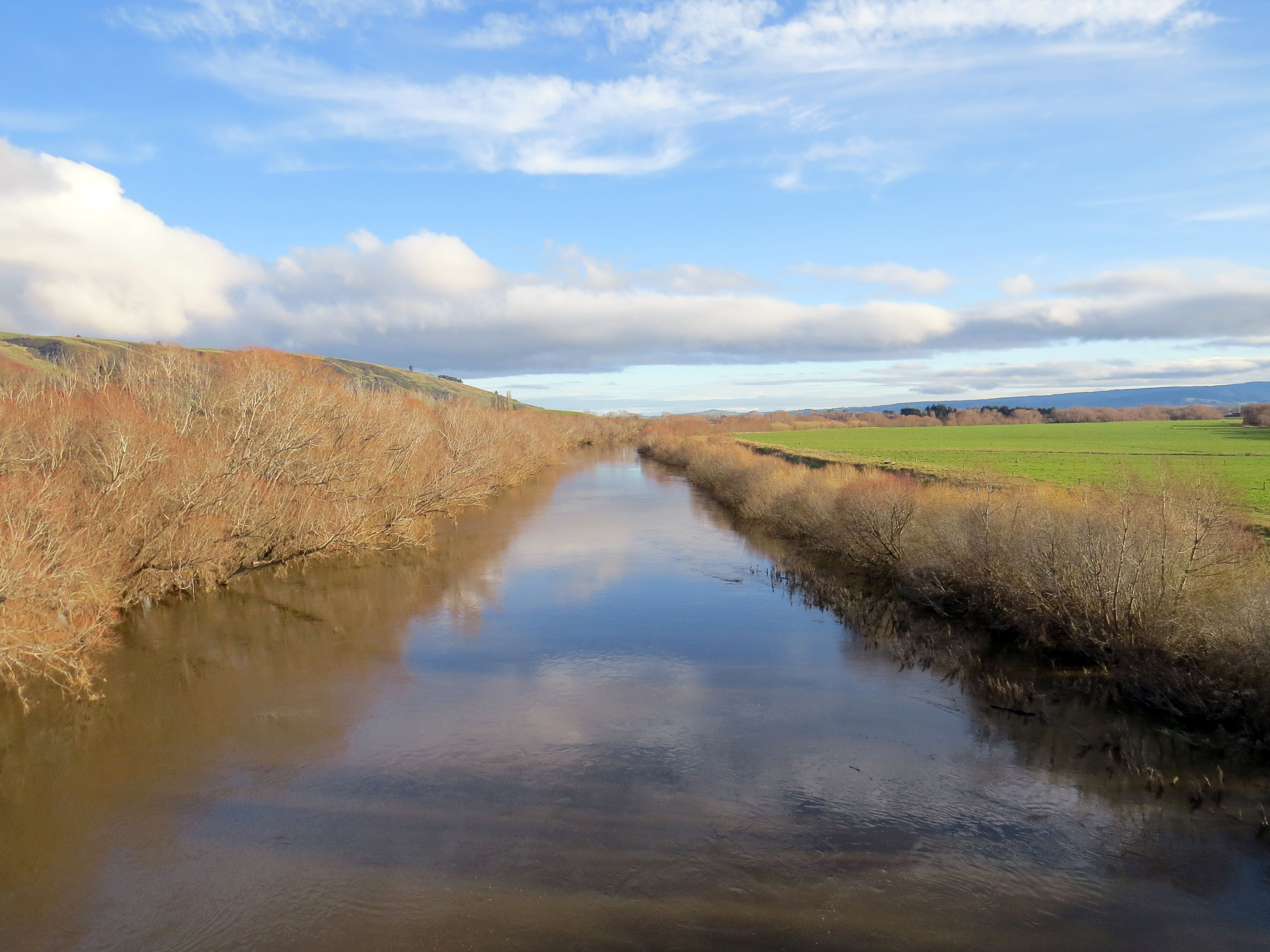
The Taieri River at Allanton

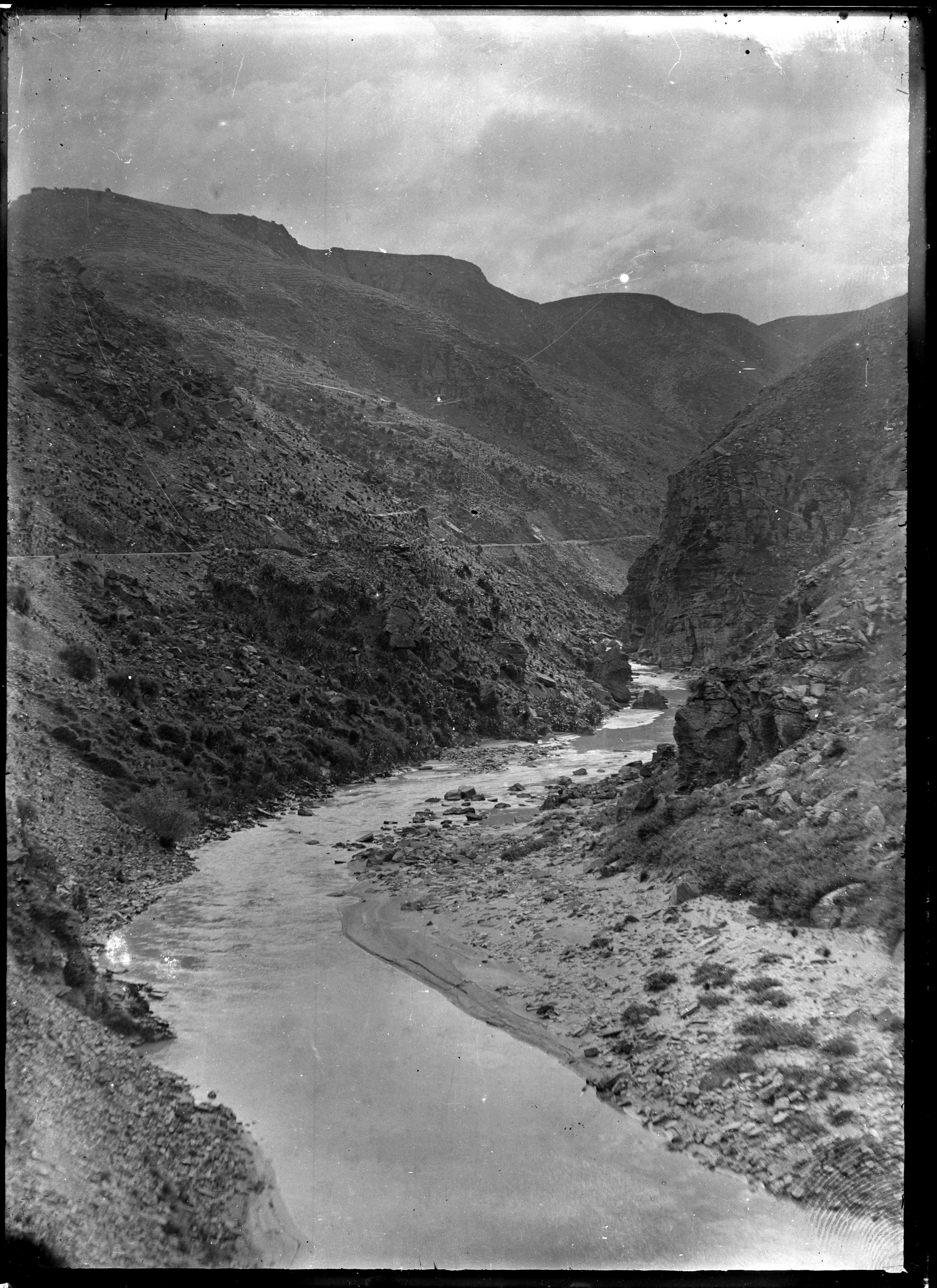
Section of Taieri River and adjacent railway line circa 1926

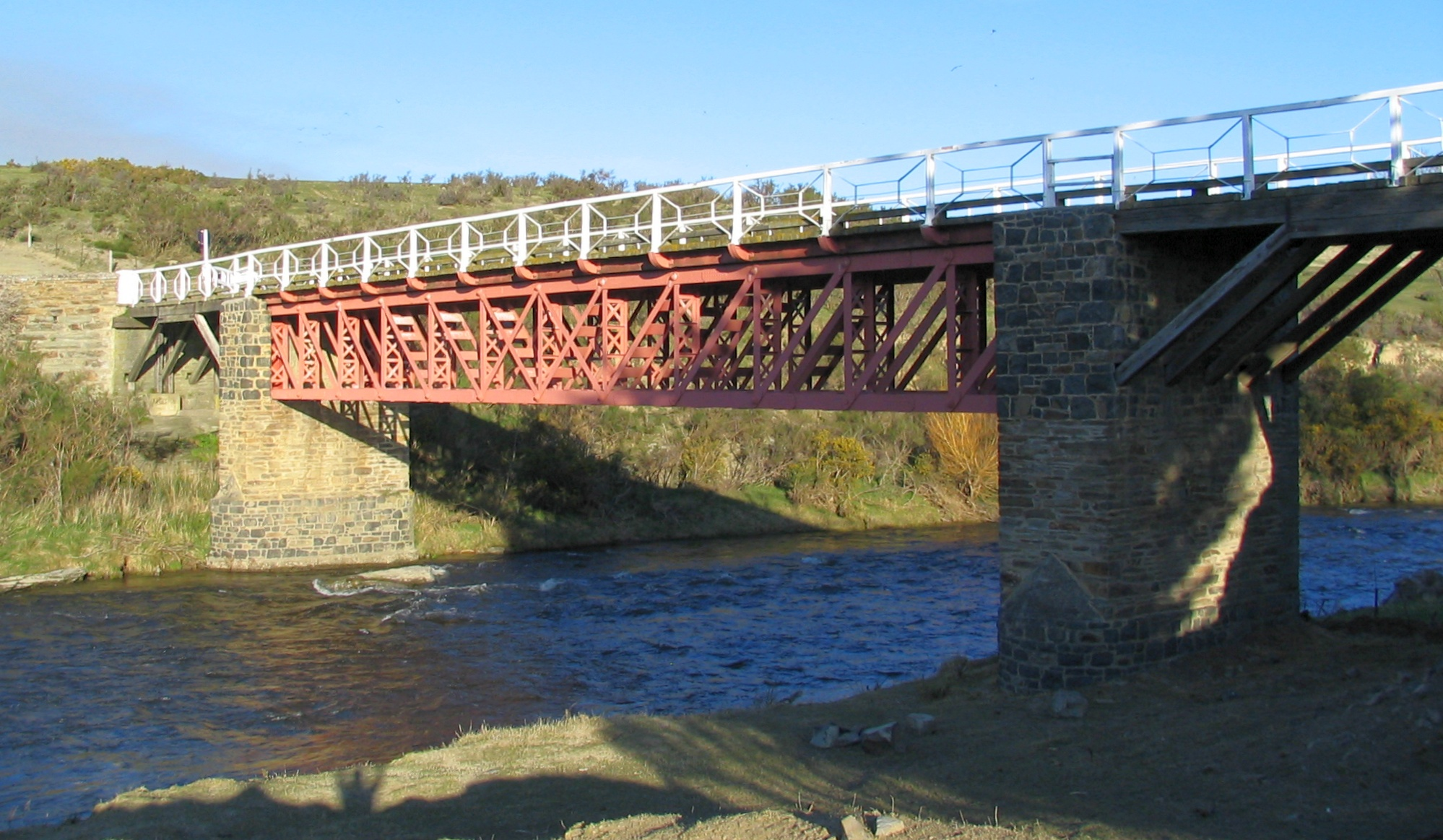
Hyde-Macraes Bridge

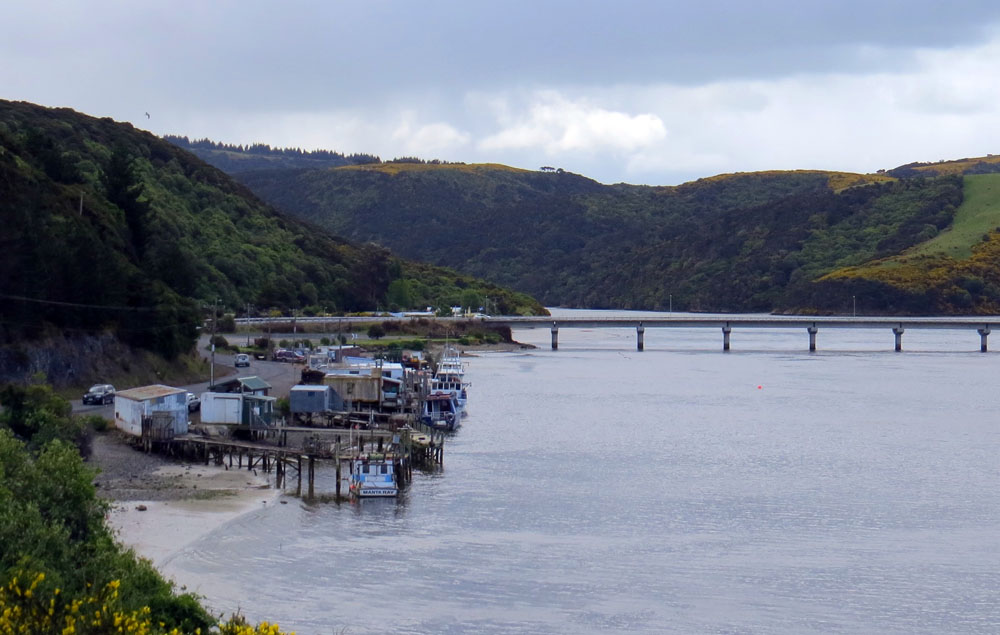
Taieri Mouth Bridge

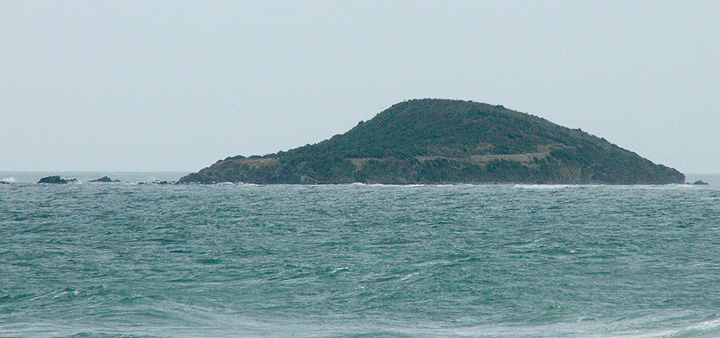
Taieri Island / Moturata, offshore from the mouth of the Taieri River

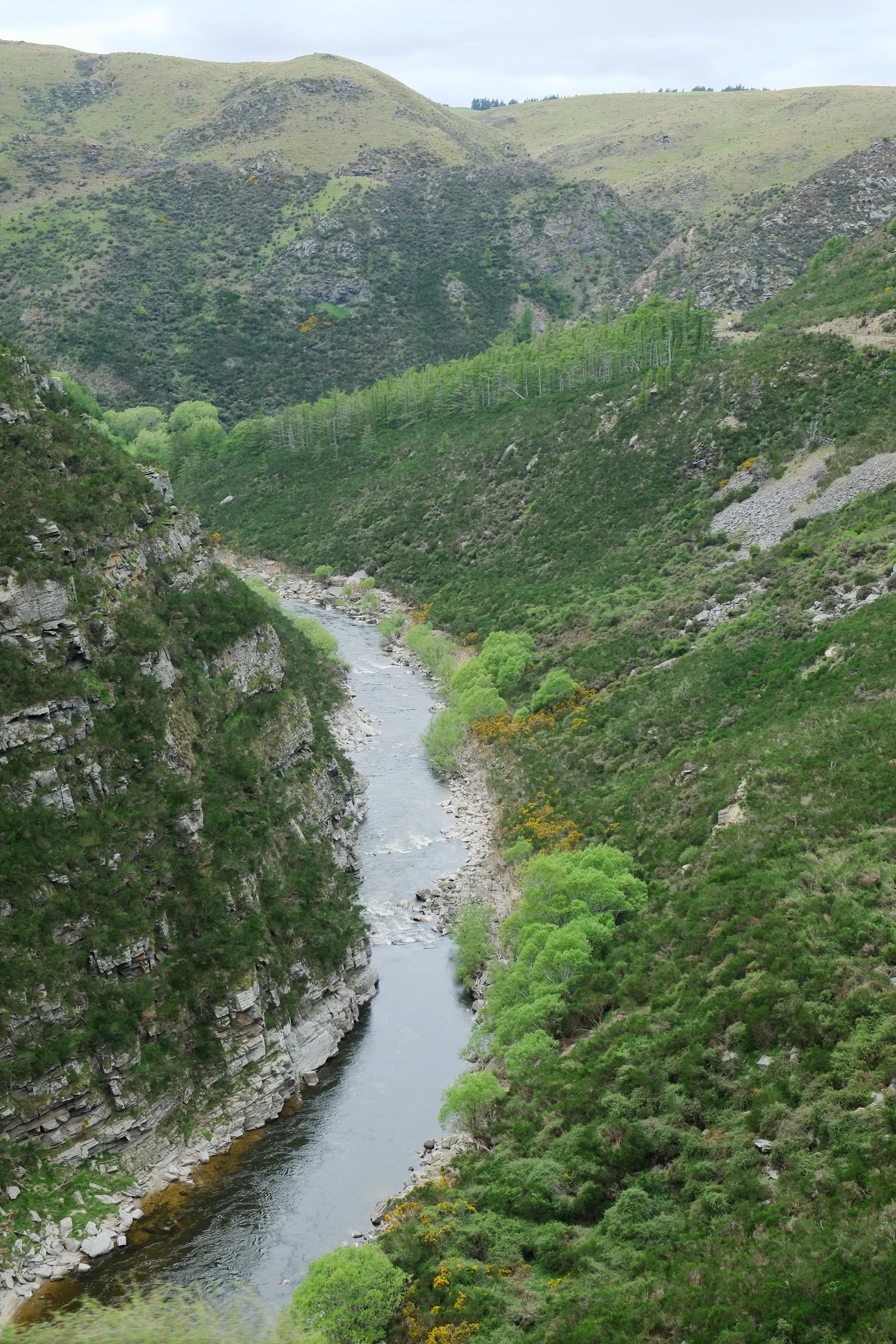
Taieri River east of Flat Stream
