= The Silverpeaks =

Mountain range in Otago, New Zealand

Coordinates: 45.7°S 170.417°E

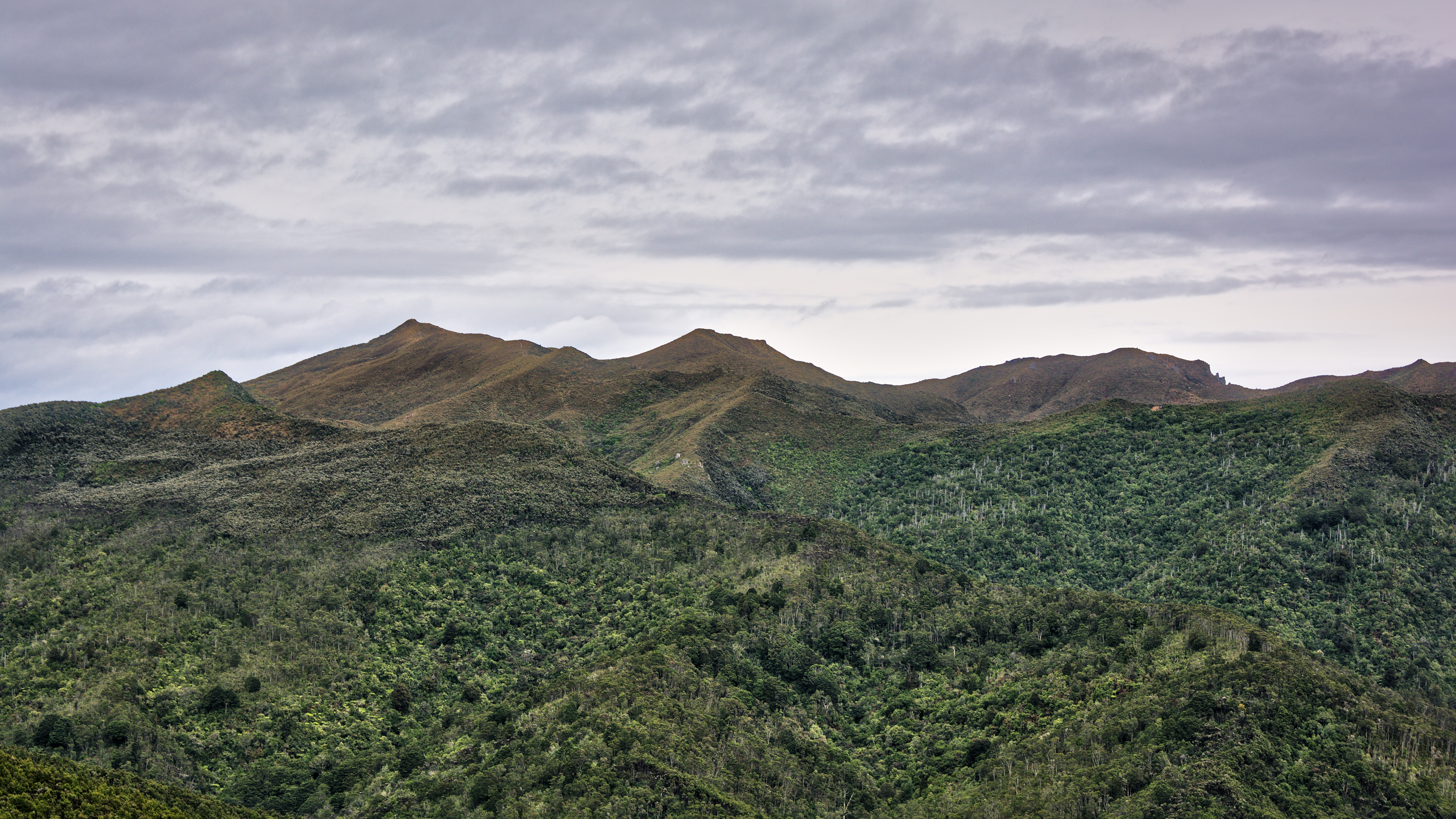
Silver Peaks skyline

The Silverpeaks (sometimes spelt Silver Peaks) is an area of rough forest and tussock and scrub covered hill country inland and to the northwest of Dunedin, New Zealand. The area is largely uninhabited; the main indication of human activity is the Taieri Gorge Railway, which preserves the route of the former Otago Central Railway that runs along the steep-sided valley of the Taieri River. Much of the area lies within the Silverpeaks Scenic Reserve.

== Background ==
A network of walking tracks crisscrosses the area. From Pulpit Rock, trampers descend the Devil's Staircase into a lush valley just a short distance from Jubilee Hut. Access to these tracks is mainly via Double Hill Road, a rural road that leaves SH1 close to Waitati, and from several rural roads that leave SH87 between Outram and Middlemarch.

Several of the peaks rise to above 600 metres. The highest points in the Silverpeaks include Silver Peak (753 m), known in Māori as Huatea, Pulpit Rock (750 m), Mount Allen (705 m), Mount Misery (702 m). Several tributaries of the Taieri River have their sources on the slopes of the Silverpeaks to the west, as do several tributaries of the Waikouaiti River in the east.

Antimony was once mined near Hindon, the largest settlement in the area.

== Jubilee hut ==
The Jubilee Hut is a popular hut for hikers in the Silverpeaks. The hut contains 10 bunks and is four hours walk in from Mountain road. The first Jubilee hut was opened in 1948 with the current Jubilee hut opening in 2007.

Between November 2020 and October 2021, 600 bunk nights were booked at the hut.

== Tramping fatalities ==
As the name suggests, the region is often snow-coated in winter, and the weather in the Silverpeaks is notoriously unpredictable. The Department of Conservation considers the hiking in the area to be challenging and the country rugged. Eight international students were rescued in May 2009. They spent several hours in freezing winds and snow flurries before being rescued. They told police they had not tramped in the Silver Peaks before. Five were suffering from hypothermia. Three Logan Park High School students died in the Silver Peaks in 1983. They were walking to the Jubilee hut when they lost their way in fog and were then caught in a blizzard. Another fatality occurred in 1945 during a snow storm in the Silverpeaks.
