= Taieri Gorge Railway =

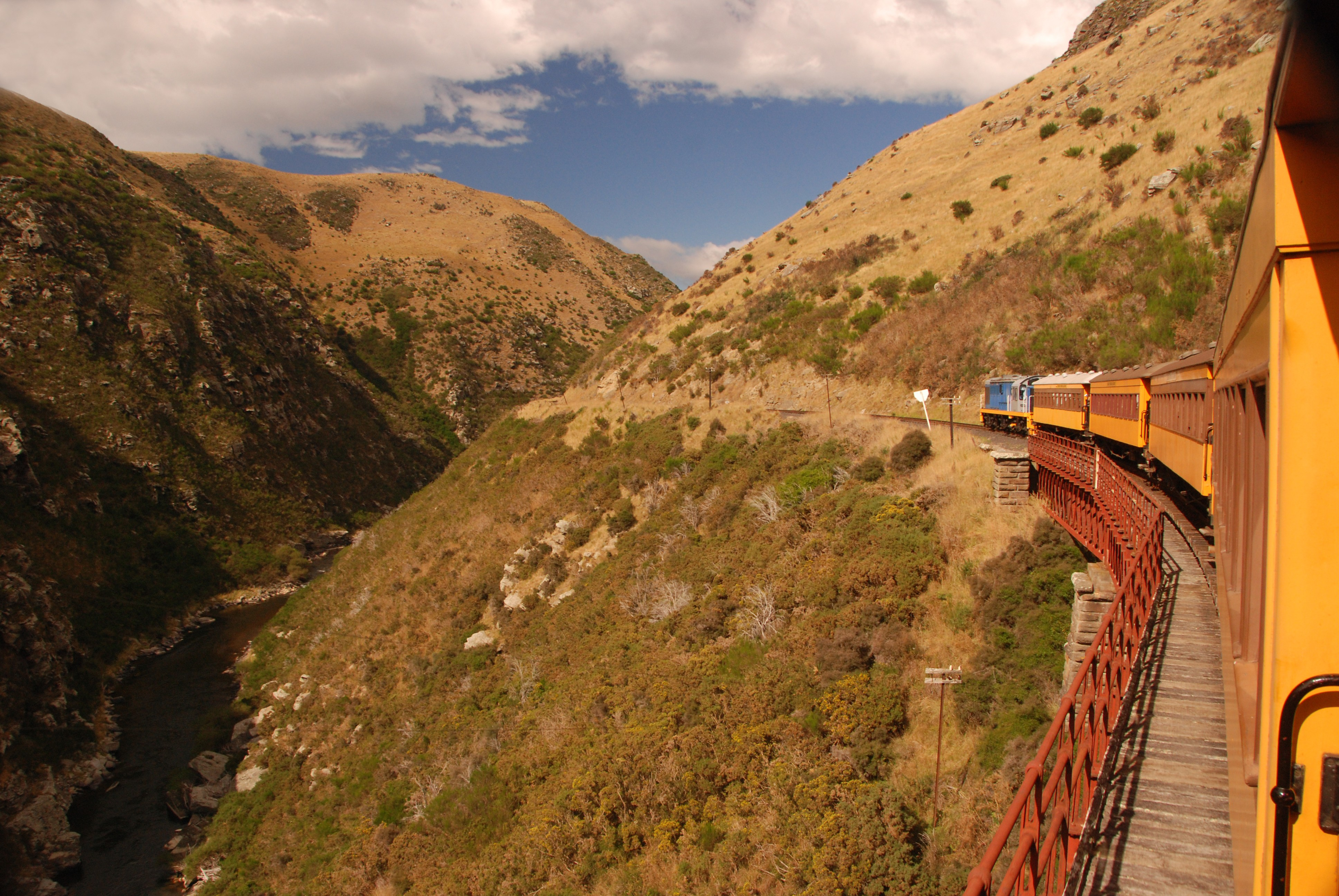
- Train travelling through the Taieri Gorge

Overview
- Status: Operational
- Owner: Dunedin Railway Station
- Locale: Otago, New Zealand
- Termini: Taieri Branch (4 km peg); Middlemarch
- Stations: 5

Service
- Type: Heritage railway
- Operator: Dunedin Railway Station

History
- Opened: 1907

Technical
- Line length: 60 km (37 mi)
- Number of tracks: Single track
- Character: Tourist railway
- Track gauge: 1,067 mm (3 ft 6 in)

The Taieri Gorge Railway is the official name for the section of the Otago Central Railway now owned and operated by Dunedin Railway Station. The line starts at the 4 km (2.5 mi) peg on the Taieri Branch, 18 km (11 mi) west of Dunedin, through to Middlemarch, a distance of 60 kilometres (37 mi). Between Dunedin and the start of the line, trains operated by Dunedin Railway Station use the Main South Line, part of KiwiRail's network.

== Name ==
The railway line has been known as the Taieri Gorge Railway since 1996.

== Services ==
Dunedin Railway Station operates the Taieri Gorge Limited on the line.

The line travels along the banks of the Taieri River, through numerous tunnels and along the Taieri Gorge to the Strath Taieri. It crosses a dozen viaducts and passes through ten tunnels.

At Wingatui railway station, the original building and signal box from 1914 have been restored. After the line passes through the 437-metre (1,434 ft) long Salisbury Tunnel, the longest on the line, it crosses Mullocky Gully over the 197-metre (646 ft) long Wingatui Viaduct, the largest wrought iron structure in New Zealand since it was built in 1887. The 47 m (154 ft) tall viaduct's riveted truss structure rests on seven concrete and masonry piers.

Shortly after the Wingatui Viaduct, the route emerges from Mullocky Gully to join Taieri Gorge, and from then on follows that gorge above Taieri River to just east of Pukerangi. On the way the line passes former stations Parera, Mount Allen, Little Mount Allen, and Christmas Creek, crossing two curved viaducts at the latter two locations. Hindon, still operating as a crossing station, is typically one of the stopping points on the trip. Just before the station, the railway tracks share a combined road-rail bridge with Hindon Road.

Another stopping point for photo opportunities is the Deep Stream viaduct. Here the line slowly starts to climb higher and out of the gorge, passing over the Flat Stream viaduct, and "The Notches", a section of short bridges and cuttings through several rocky outcrops, on its way to Pukerangi. Between Pukerangi and Middlemarch, the railway only once more comes close to the Taieri River, where it crosses Sutton Creek over another combined road-rail bridge.

== Gallery ==
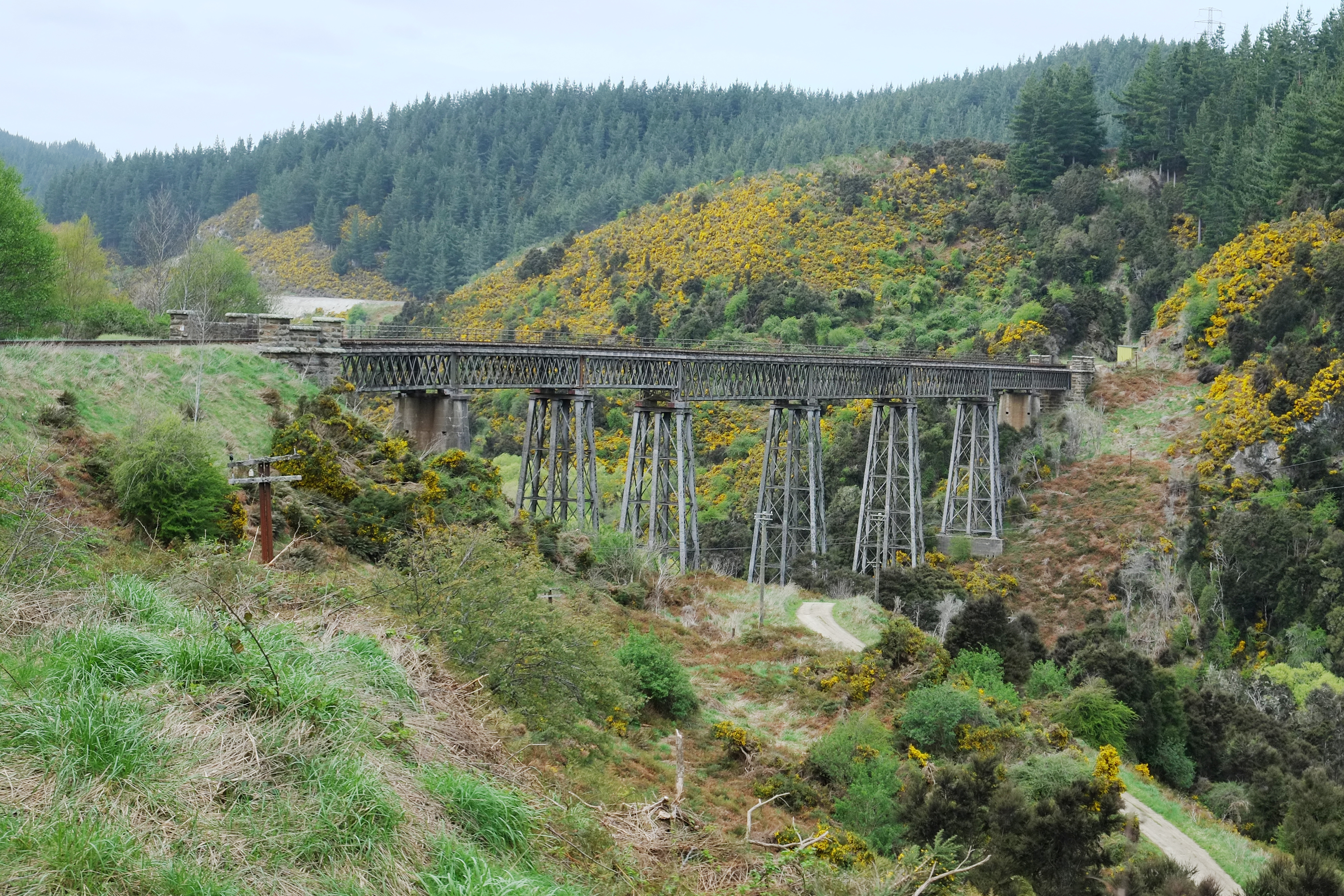
Wingatui Viaduct

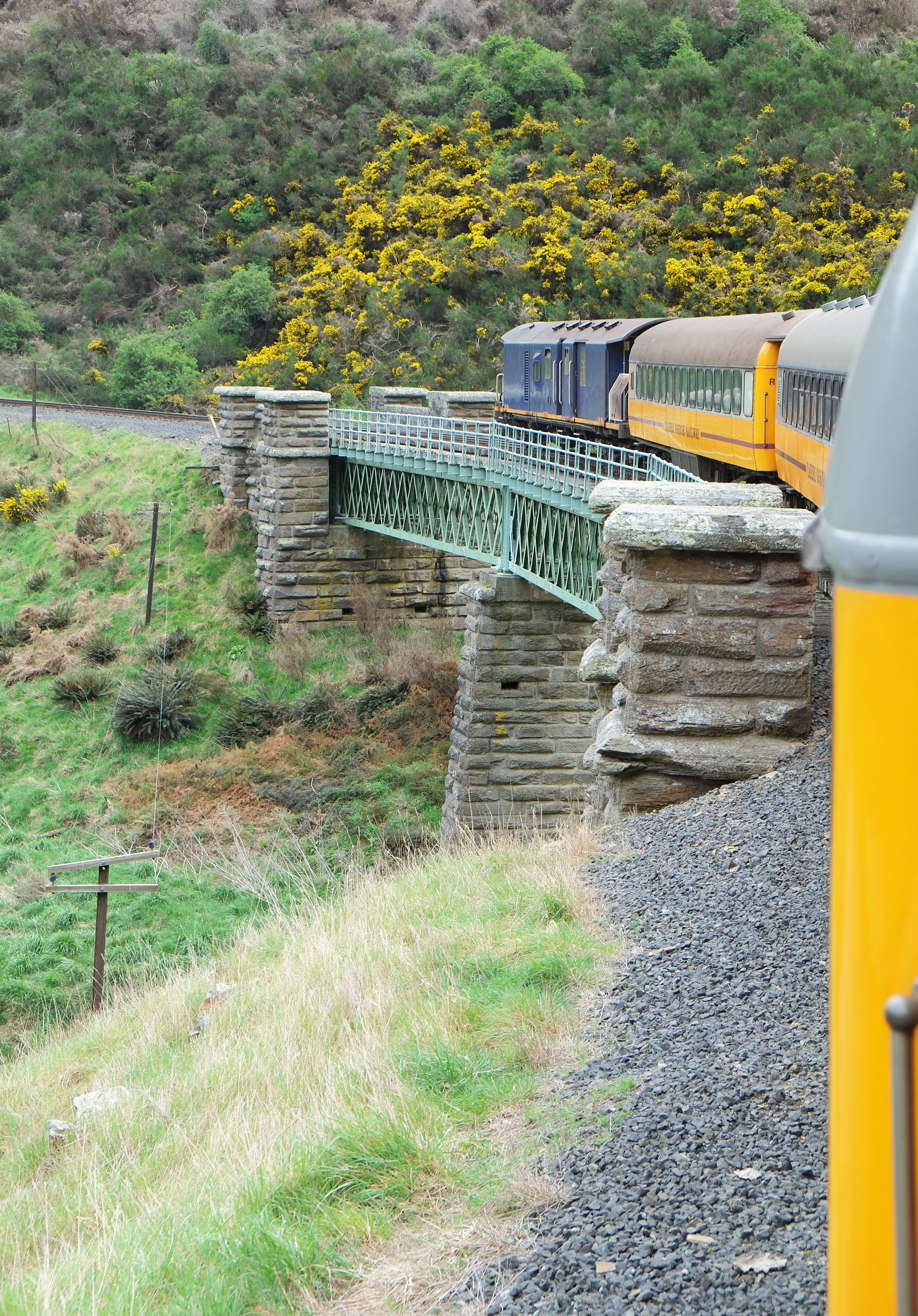
Train crossing the Christmas Creek Viaduct

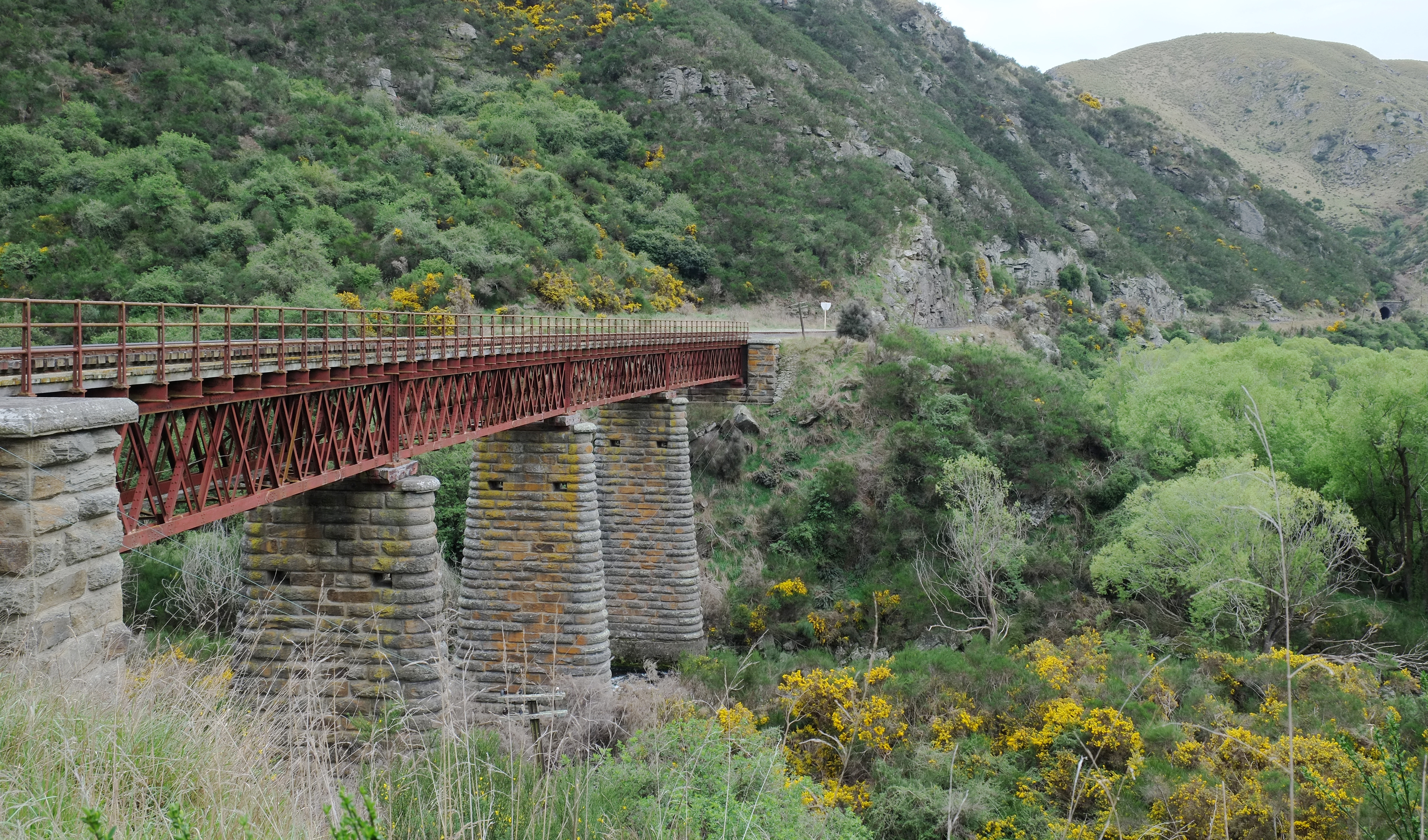
Deep Stream Viaduct

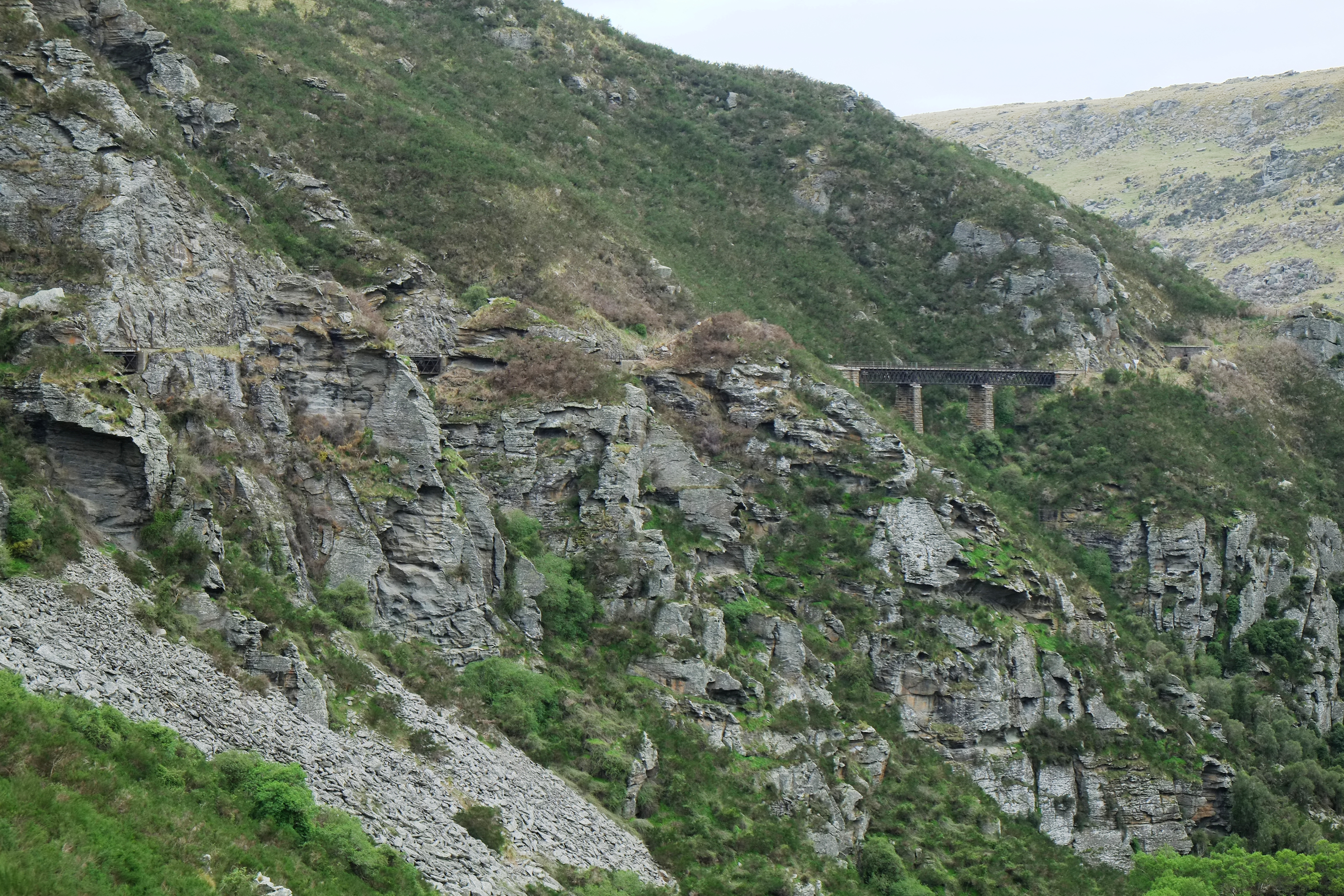
The Notches

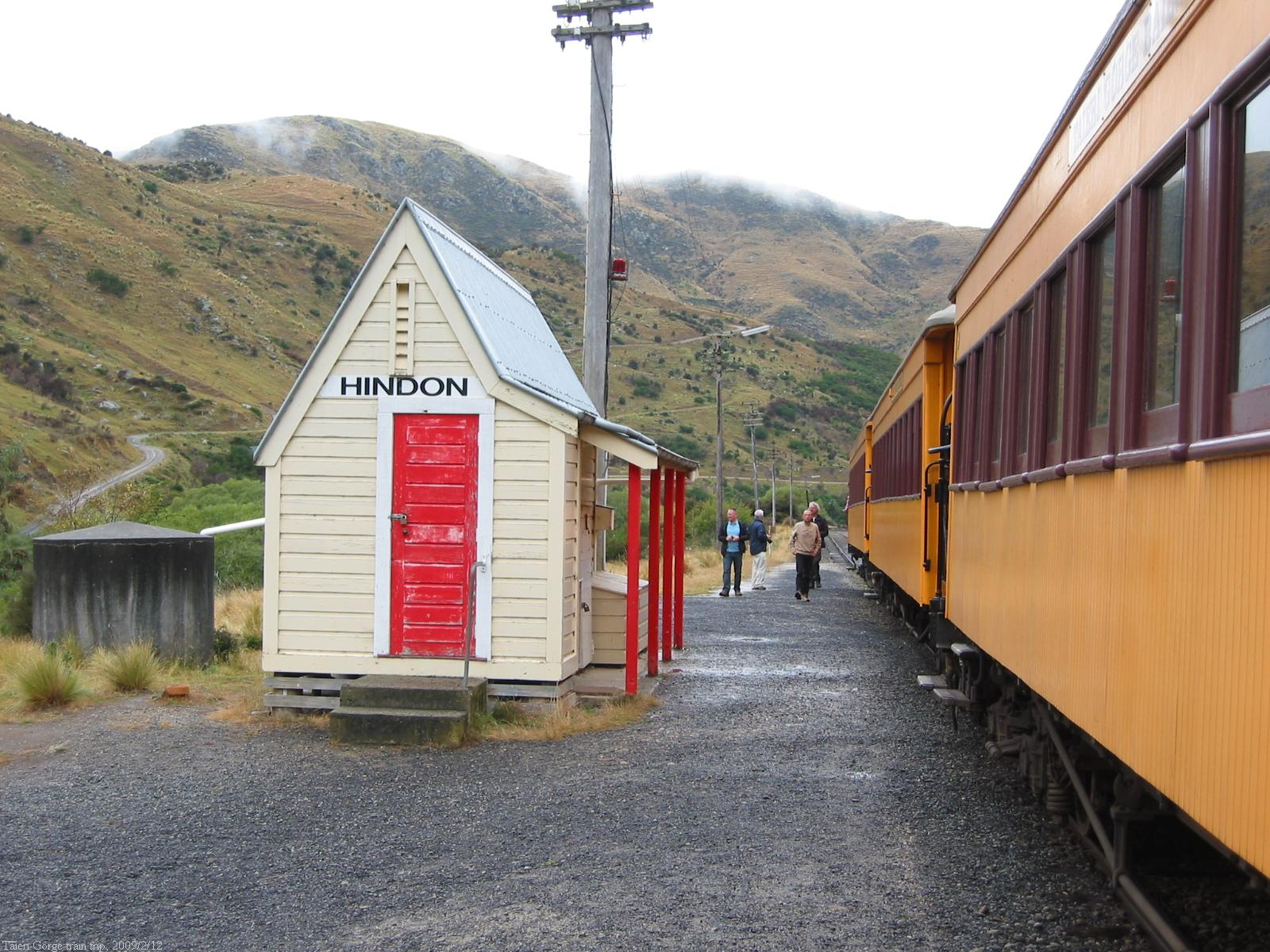
Hindon station

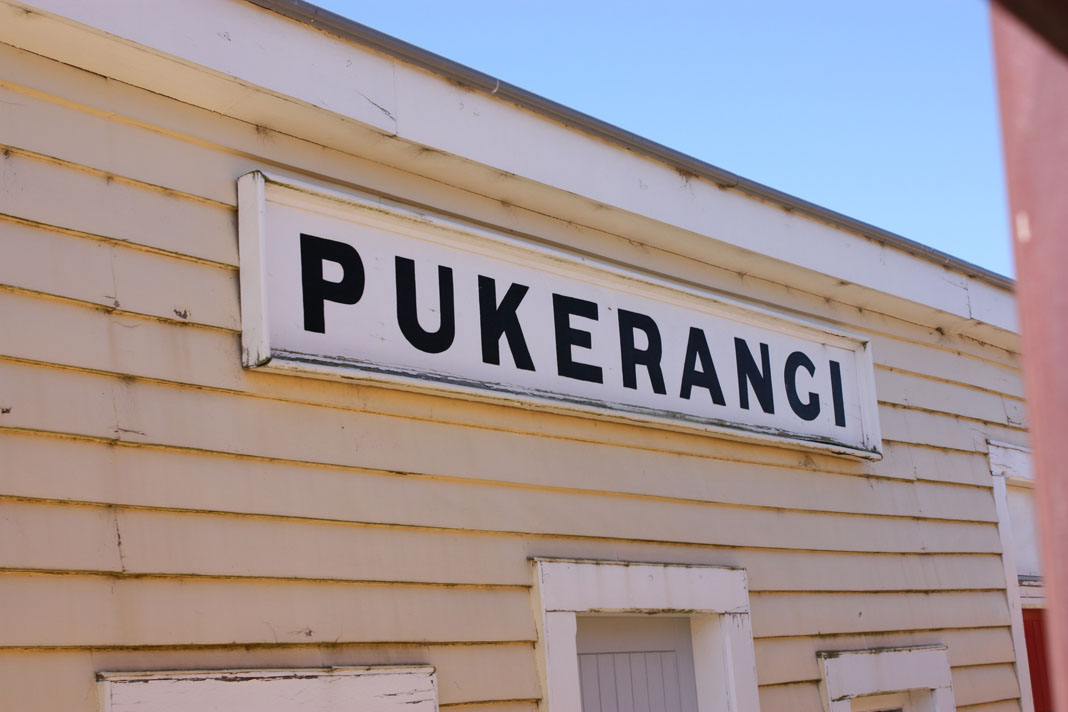
Pukerangi station

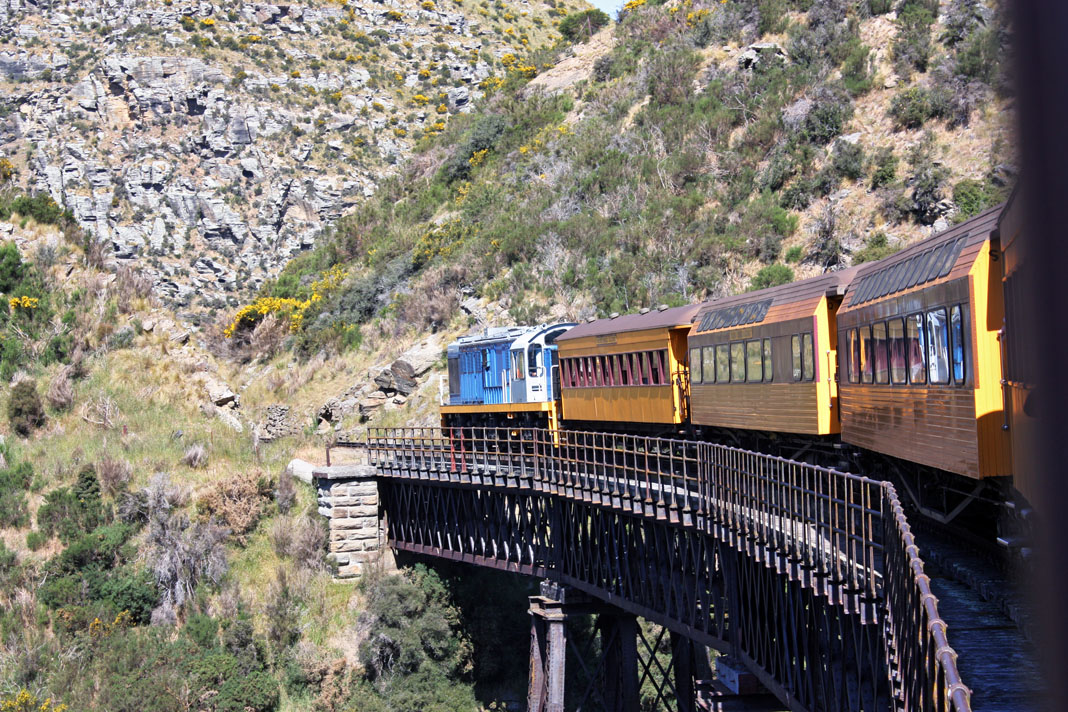
Train crossing a viaduct

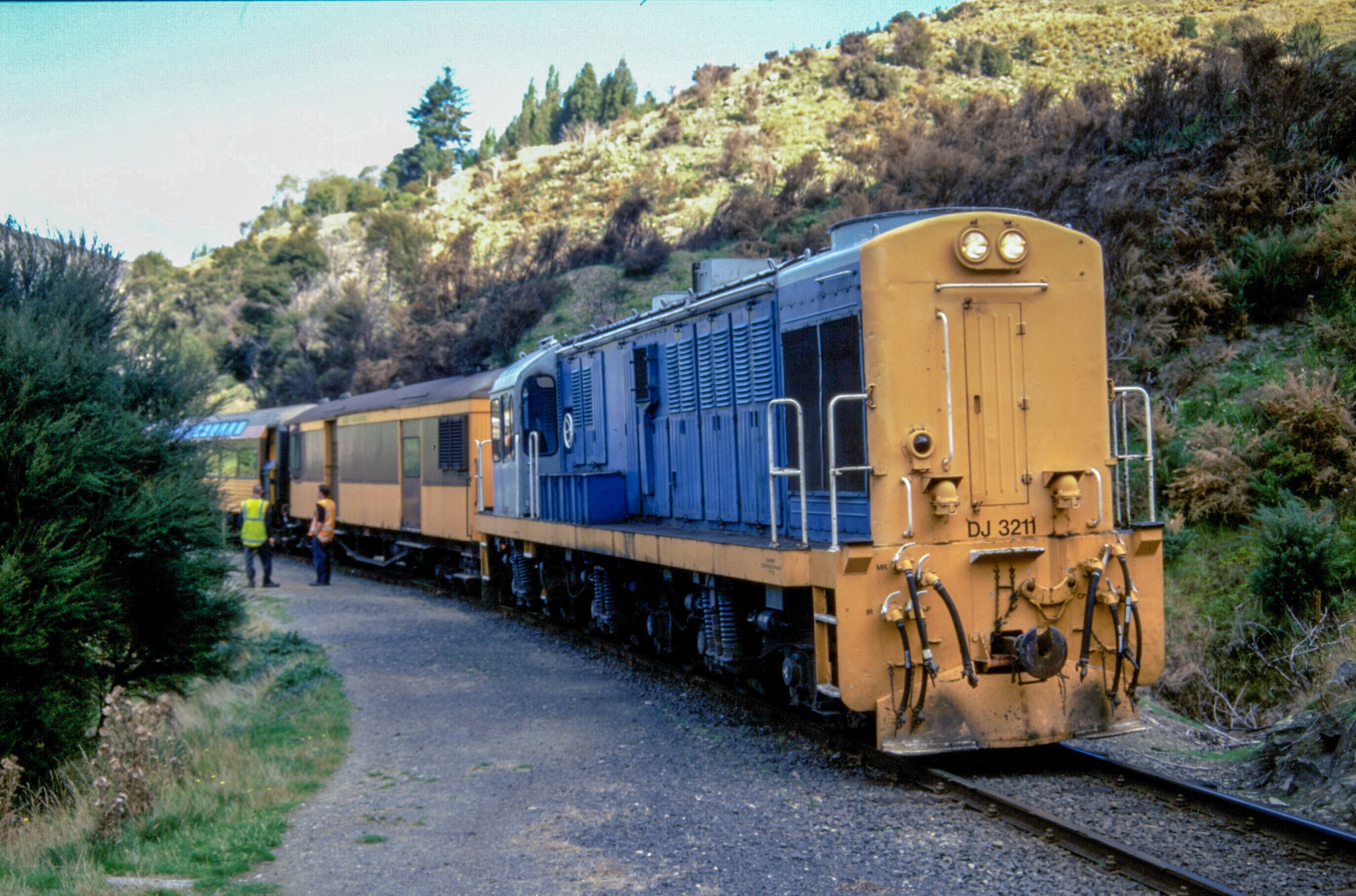
View of the Taieri Gorge
