= Otago Central Railway =

Branch railway line in Otago, New Zealand

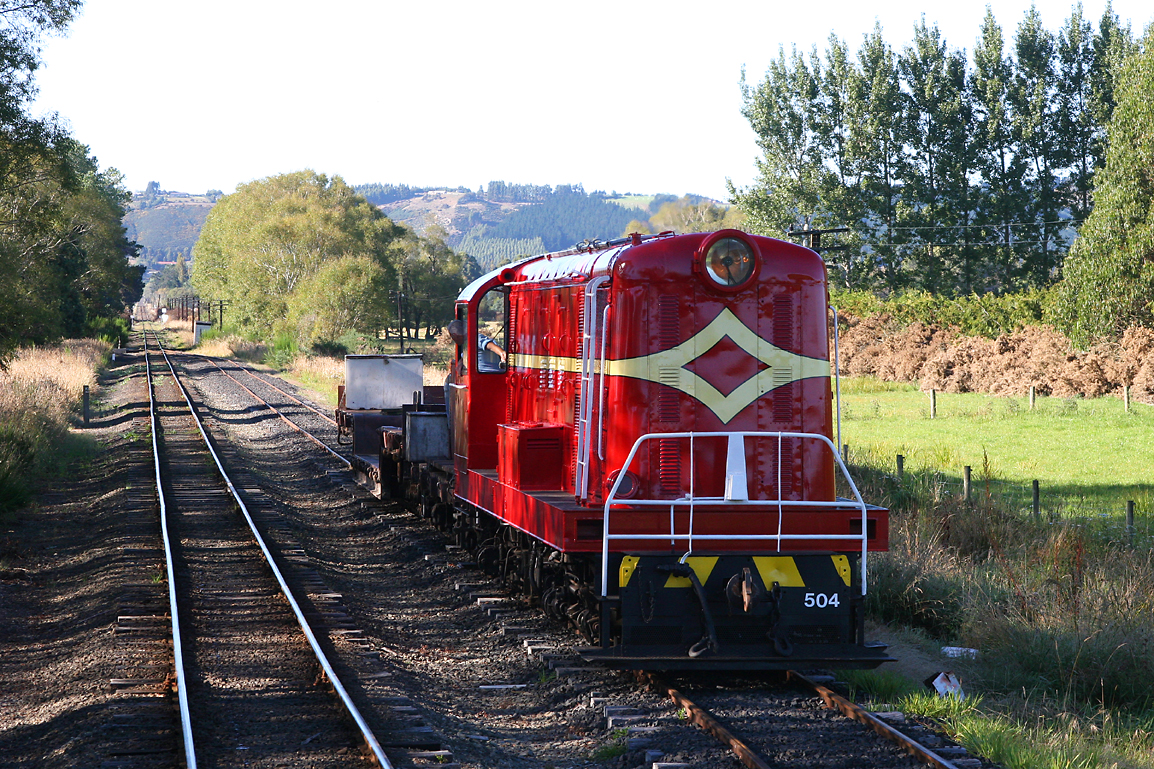
- DE class locomotive 504 on the Otago Central Railway

Overview
- Status: Open to Pukerangi for passengers, closed and removed beyond Middlemarch
- Owner: KiwiRail (first 3.5km); Dunedin Railways
- Locale: Otago, New Zealand
- Termini: Wingatui; Middlemarch
- Stations: 3

Service
- Operator(s): Dunedin Railways

History
- Opened: 11 July 1921 (to Cromwell)
- Closed: 14 April 1980 (Clyde - Cromwell); 30 April 1990 (Middlemarch - Clyde)

Technical
- Line length: 64 km (originally 236 km)
- Number of tracks: 1
- Track gauge: 3 ft 6 in (1,067 mm)
- Minimum radius: 140 metres (7 chains)
- Operating speed: 50 km/h
- Highest elevation: 28 m to 254 m
- Maximum incline: 1 in 50

Map

The Otago Central Railway (OCR) or in later years Otago Central Branch Railway was a secondary railway line in Central Otago, in the South Island of New Zealand. The line was closed by the New Zealand Railways Corporation in 1990, with one section becoming the Taieri Gorge Railway operated by Dunedin Railway Station, and the section between Middlemarch and Clyde becoming a bicycle trail known as the Otago Central Rail Trail.

== Construction ==
Construction of the OCR began in 1877 and the 27-km section to Hindon was opened in 1889. The line was completed to Middlemarch two years later. The 26 km section of line from Middlemarch to Hyde then opened in 1894. This was followed by the 16 km section from Hyde to Kokonga which opened in 1897. The section to Ranfurly opened in December 1898. The Ranfurly to Wedderburn section opened in 1900 followed by the Wedderburn to Ida Valley section which opened in 1901. The line was opened to Omakau in 1904. Omakau-Chatto Creek opened in July 1906 followed by the line reaching Alexandra in December 1906. The line was opened to Clyde in April 1907. There then followed a delay until the section through the Cromwell Gorge was resumed in 1914. The line reached Cromwell, 236 km, in July 1921. The Clyde - Cromwell section (20 km) was closed in April 1980 due to construction of the Clyde Dam, a hydro-electric power station in the Cromwell Gorge on the Clutha River. The dam flooded the gorge, through which the line ran, to form Lake Dunstan.

== Topography ==
The branch begins at Wingatui railway station on the Main South Line south of Dunedin. After the branch line closed, the first four kilometres were retained in the national railway network as a service line to local industries. The Dunedin Railways (formerly known as Taieri Gorge Railway) line officially begins at the 4 km peg and shortly thereafter passes around a horseshoe curve at the foot of the Salisbury bank and begins a climb at 1 in 50 to the summit at 145 m, where it passes through the 437 metres (1,434 ft) long Salisbury Tunnel, the longest on the line. After a second tunnel, the railway runs along Mullocky Gully, crossing it over the 197 metres (646 ft) long Wingatui Viaduct, before joining the Taieri Gorge. Wingatui Viaduct has been the largest wrought iron structure in New Zealand since it was built in 1887 and is the longest and tallest (47 m) bridge on the line. The railway remains in the Taieri Gorge for 25 km, crossing 16 major bridges with a total length of 1020 m and passing through 10 tunnels with a total length of 1491 m.

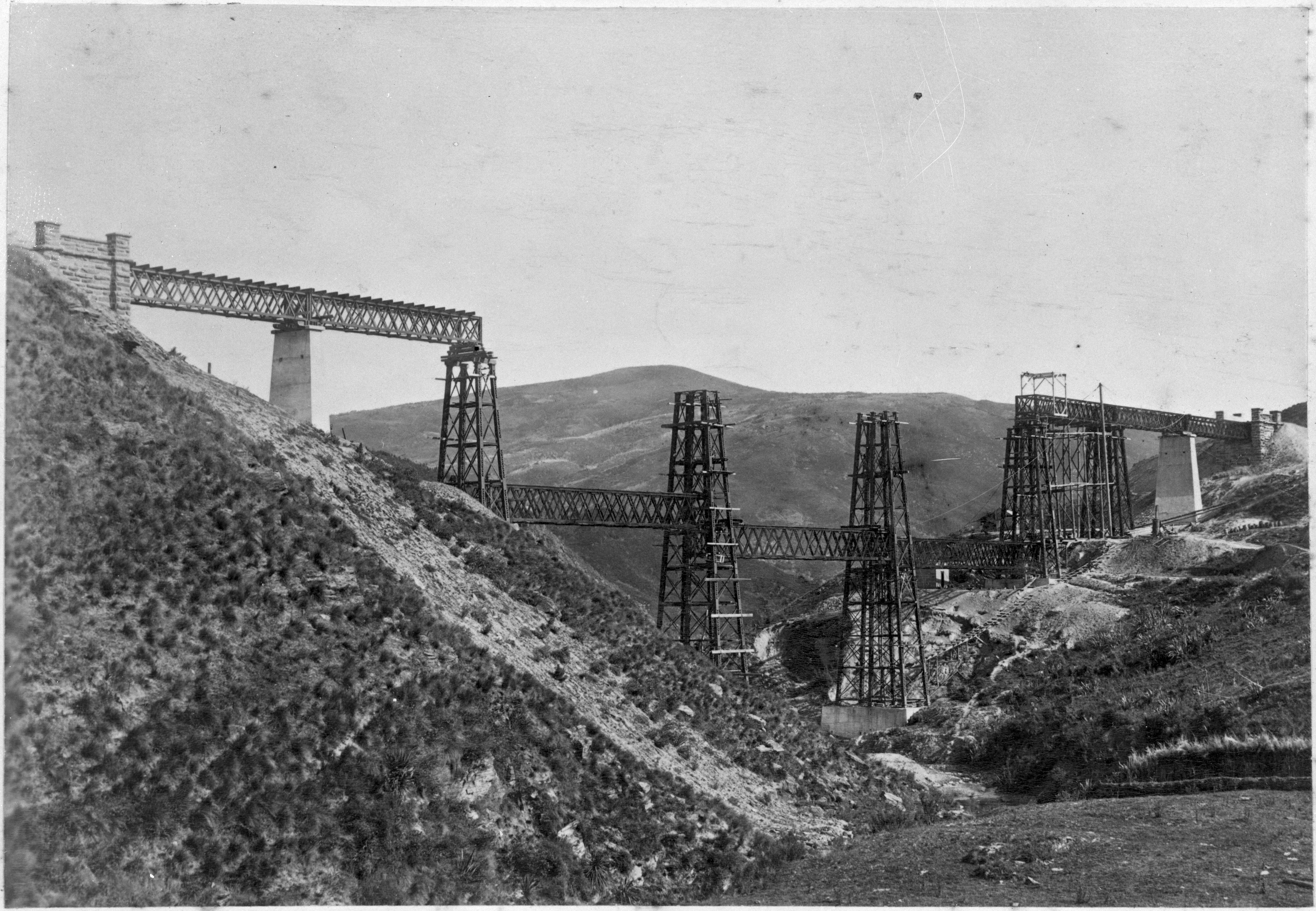
Wingatui Viaduct under construction

Further notable viaducts along the way are Christmas Creek Viaduct, one of the curved viaducts, Deep Stream Viaduct, and Flat Stream Viaduct, also curved. Just before Hindon station, the railway tracks share a combined road-rail bridge with Hindon Road, a local backroad. After Flat Stream Viaduct, the aptly named "The Notches" section also presented an engineering challenge, accomplished via three short bridges and cuttings through several rocky outcrops. In the second half of the gorge section the line climbs steadily to exit the gorge at Pukerangi (45 km, 254 m altitude) and then descends into the Strath Taieri plateau before reaching Middlemarch at 64 km.

On the remaining line between Wingatui and Middlemarch, passing loops exist at North Taieri and Parera, service sidings at Mount Allen, and both passing loops and sidings at Hindon, Pukerangi and Middlemarch.

In 2004, the line had two single-deck combined road and rail bridges; at Sutton and at Hindon (only combined in recent years).

== Motive power ==
=== Steam era ===
Initially the line was worked by Public Works Department F class tank engines. The Railways Department used R class locomotives until 1895 when 2-8-0 T class tender engines were introduced. They were still in service in 1905. O and P class locomotives were regularly used as were 2-6-2 V class engines. The O class engines were transferred to the North Island between 1898 and 1902. The P class engines were still working the line as late as 1915. The ten U^{B} class locomotives were all allocated to Dunedin and were the mainstay of the line from the 1900s to the 1930s and B and B^{A} class engines were used occasionally. Q class engines worked the line in the 1940s. A^{B} class locomotives were introduced in 1936.

=== Diesel era ===
The OCR was one of the first sections of the NZR system to be fully dieselised. The last regular steam-hauled train left Cromwell on 23 February 1968. Two steam excursion trains later conveyed photographers along parts of the line: A^{B} 777 to Ranfurly on 27 October 1968 and A^{B} 693 to Middlemarch on 5 April 1969.

D^{H} class diesel-electric locomotives were introduced on the line in February 1957 running as far as Clyde. They were reclassed as D^{G} in 1968 and were withdrawn by 1983. The D^{H} and D^{G} engines were too heavy to run on the lighter rails of the Cromwell Gorge but the much lighter D^{J} class diesel locomotives (with 10.3 tonne axle loading) were allowed to run through to Cromwell. With the introduction of these locomotives on 26 February 1968 the remaining A^{B} class steam engines were withdrawn. D^{I} class diesels worked the line from 1978 to 1984 but being fewer in number were seen less often than the D^{J}s, which were the mainstay of the line until its closure in 1990.

== Passenger services and railcars ==
Passenger services were introduced in 1900 and replaced with mixed trains in 1917, with passenger trains only running during holiday periods. Passenger trains were reinstated in 1936. One of these trains was involved in the Hyde railway disaster of 4 June 1943, which claimed 21 lives and was at the time New Zealand's worst railway disaster (since surpassed only by the Tangiwai disaster). The passenger trains were again replaced with mixed trains in 1951, in turn replaced with Vulcan railcars in 1956. The railcar run was cut back to Alexandra in May 1958 and railcars ceased running on 25 April 1976.

== Closure ==
The line remained open for some time longer than most other branch lines in the South Island, and was used to move construction materials for the Clyde Dam project. With the completion of the dam in 1990, there was little other traffic for the line and the line was closed by the New Zealand Railways Corporation on 30 April 1990. The demolition of the line from Clyde back to Middlemarch commenced on 8 December 1990 and was completed on 5 December 1991. The section from Wingatui on the outskirts of Dunedin and to Middlemarch became a tourist railway, operated by Dunedin Railways. The remainder of the line was lifted and the trackbed developed into the Otago Central Rail Trail. Services ceased to run beyond Pukerangi from January 2020.

== Stations ==
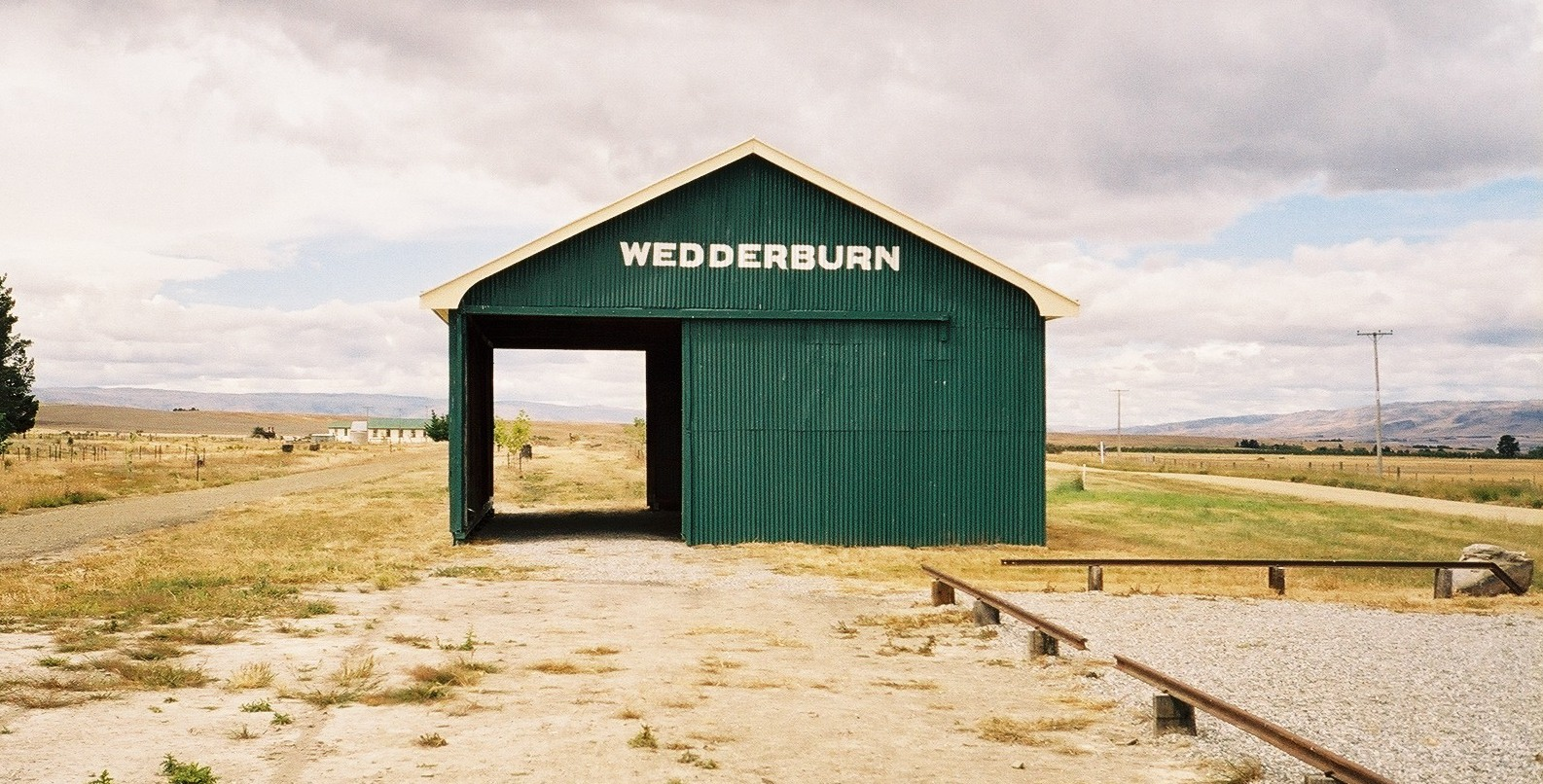
Goods shed at Wedderburn, photographed in 2004 after the line's conversion to a rail trail.

- Wingatui (0 km)
- Salisbury (10.4 km) Closed March 1978
- Taioma (12 km) Closed November 1967
- Parera (16.3 km) Closed August 1967
- Mount Allan (21.1 km)
- Christmas Creek (25.3 km) Closed July 1970
- Hindon (26.8 km)
- Deep Stream (30.9 km) Closed September 1954
- Flat Stream (36.7 km) Opened February 1942, closed September 1954
- The Reefs (42.1 km)
- Pukerangi (45 km)
- Matarae (52 km) Closed March 1985
- Matarae Siding (54 km) Closed December 1960
- Sutton (57.1 km) Closed November 1986
- Middlemarch (63.8 km)
- Ngapuna (70 km) Closed December 1979
- Rock and Pillar (77 km) Closed December 1981
- Hyde (90 km)
- Hyde Township (91.5 km)
- Tiroiti (98 km) Closed April 1974
- Kokonga (106 km) Closed August 1985
- Waipiata (116 km) Closed December 1981
- Ranfurly (123.5 km)
- Wedderburn (137 km)
- Oturehua (149 km)
- Ida Valley (157 km)
- Auripo (161 km)
- Lauder (172 km) Closed April 1985
- Omakau (178.5 km) Closed March 1984
- Chatto Creek (190 km) Closed February 1983
- Galloway (200 km) Closed June 1978
- Alexandra (207 km)
- Clyde (new) (214 km)
- Clyde (old) (216 km)
- Doigs (224 km) Closed March 1970
- Waenga (231 km) Closed March 1970
- Cromwell (236 km)
