= George Troup (architect) =

New Zealand architect, engineer, and statesman

Sir George Troup CMG
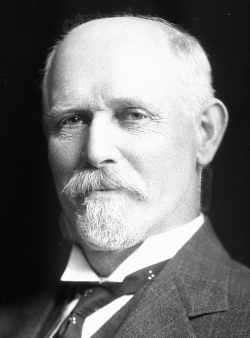

23rd Mayor of Wellington
- In office 1927–1931
- Deputy: Martin Luckie
- Preceded by: Charles Norwood
- Succeeded by: Thomas Hislop

Personal details
- Born: 21 October 1863 London, England
- Died: 4 October 1941 (aged 77) Wellington, New Zealand
- Party: Reform
- Spouse: Annie Mary Sloan (m. 1897)

Sir George Alexander Troup CMG (21 October 1863 – 4 October 1941) was a New Zealand architect, engineer, and statesman. He was nicknamed "Gingerbread George" after his most famous design, the Dunedin Railway Station in the Flemish Renaissance style (he preferred his alternative design in the Scottish Baronial style). He was the first official architect of the New Zealand Railways. He designed many other stations, including Lower Hutt and Petone.

== Early life and education ==
He was born in London, England. His family returned to Edinburgh, Scotland, soon after he was born. His widowed mother sent him to Robert Gordon's College, Aberdeen, where he was entitled to free board and tuition as the son of an Aberdeen burgess.

He trained as an architect and engineer under C.E. Calvert in Edinburgh, and in 1882 was employed as a draughtsman by architect J.J.A. Chesser.

== Career ==
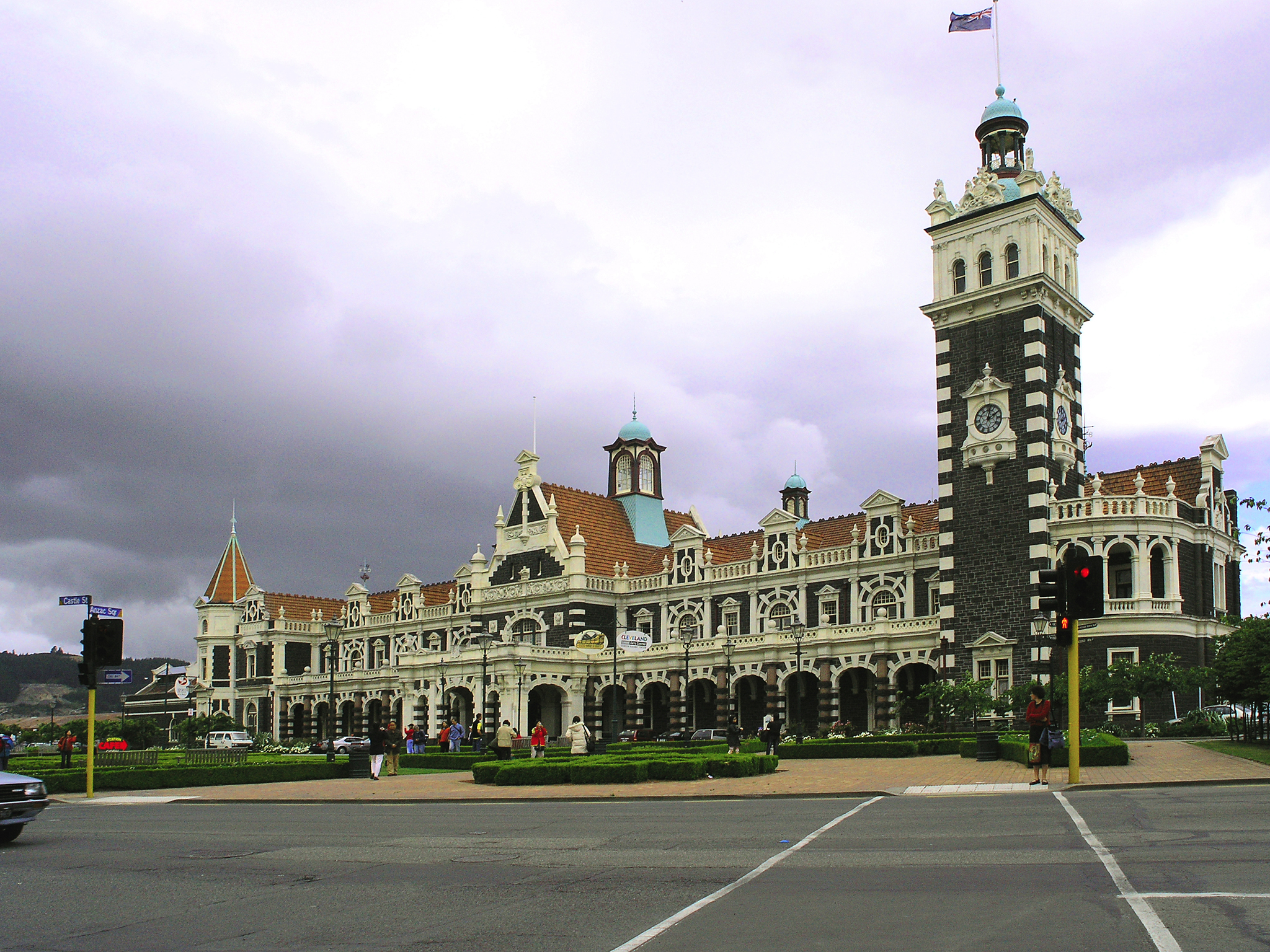
The George Troup designed Dunedin Railway Station

He immigrated to New Zealand in 1884. Joining the Survey Department when he arrived in Dunedin, he worked in remote survey gangs. In 1886, he joined the New Zealand Railways Department as an engineering draughtsman, having studied at the Otago School of Mines to qualify for the position. He soon transferred to the Head Office in Wellington, where he spent 37 of his 39 years in the Railways, and was responsible for the design of railway stations, bridges and viaducts, and for Railways housing.

His crowning achievement was the design and construction of Dunedin railway station, of 1906.

He supported the Presbyterian Church including St. John's in Wellington and the Bible Class movement, the Y.M.C.A., the Wellington Boy's Institute, and the British and Foreign Bible Society. He was also President of the Friesian Cattle Breeders Association, as he farmed his country property at Plimmerton. He was associated with the development of Kelburn, and the Wellington Cable Car.

=== Standard station designs ===
When Troup became NZR's architect there were 7 standard station designs, dating from 1874, during Vogel's rail making boom. Under Troup's leadership, a plan book of revised standard station types was produced by 1904:-

- Class A

Replaced the former class 5 station, 13 ft (3.5 m) wide x 34 – 69 ft (10.4 – 21 m) long, with an enclosed lobby, ladies' waiting room and toilet, plus, at larger stations, an office and luggage room. Surviving examples are Hundalee (now at Waikari), Moana (Trans-Alpine) and Rotowaro.

- Class B

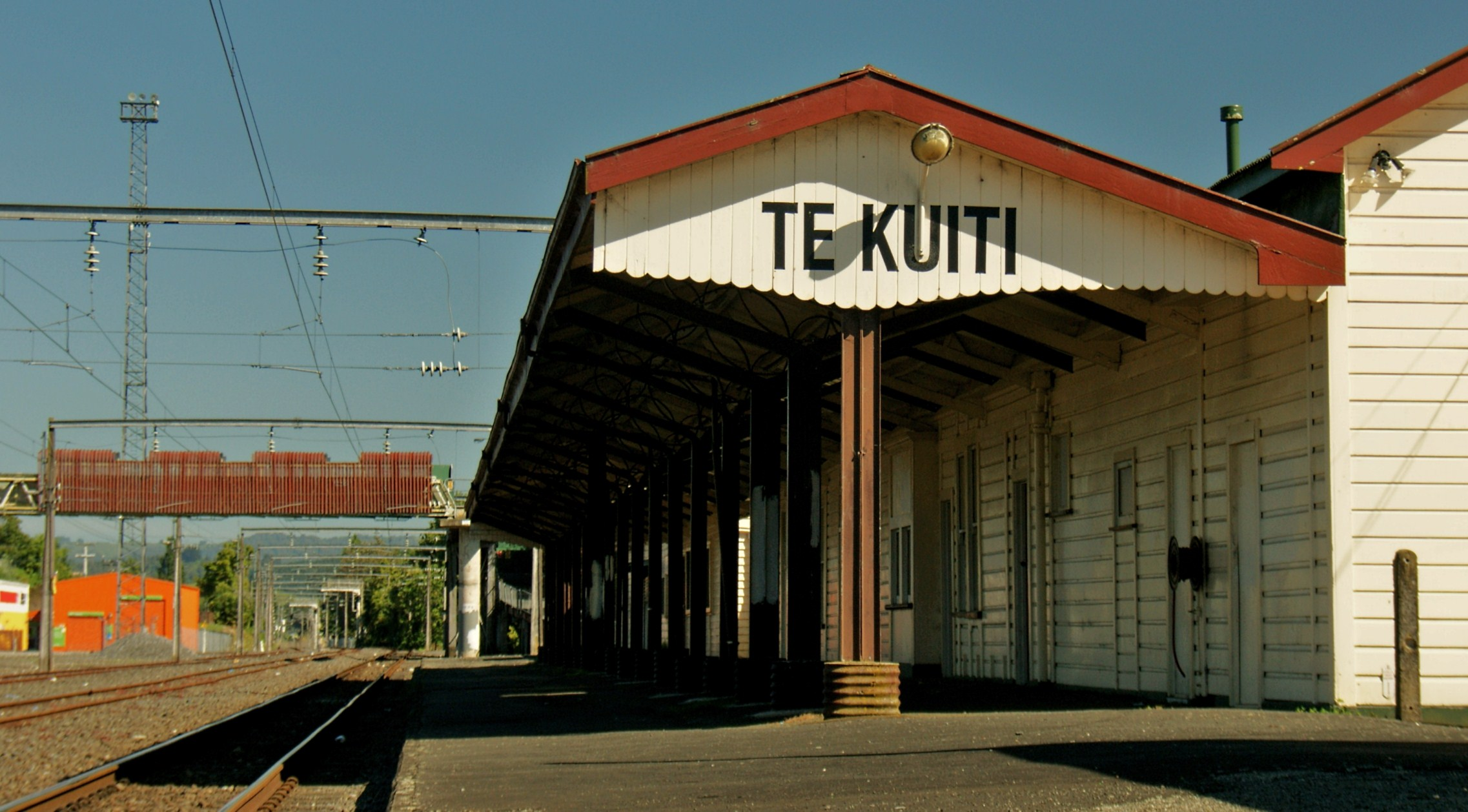
Te Kuiti described by the Rail Heritage Trust as, "the finest remaining example of a standard class B station"

Gable-roof 17 ft (5.2 m) wide x 44 –103 ft (13.4 - 31.4 m) long, with the same rooms as Class A, plus, at larger stations, ticket office, parcels room, lamp room, stationmaster's office, porters' room, and postal room, mostly with fireplaces at the apex of the roof. e.g., Glenhope, Kaikoura, Kawakawa, Ohakune, Otaki, Pukekohe, Rangiora, Te Kuiti and Waihi.

- Class C

As class B, but 20 ft (6.10 m) wide and up to 108 ft (32.9m) long, e.g. Whangārei

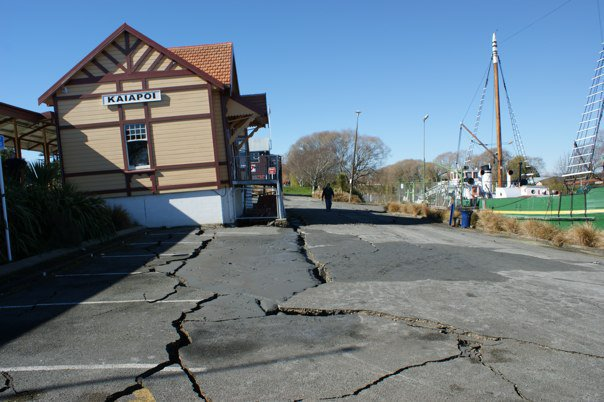
Kaiapoi 'Vintage' type after earthquake

- Vintage

16 were built between 1900 and 1908 with Tudor-style half-timbering, turrets and towers, large verandahs, tiled roofs and terracotta finials. e.g. Blenheim, Gisborne, Kaiapoi, Lower Hutt, Mataura, Oamaru, Picton and Thames.

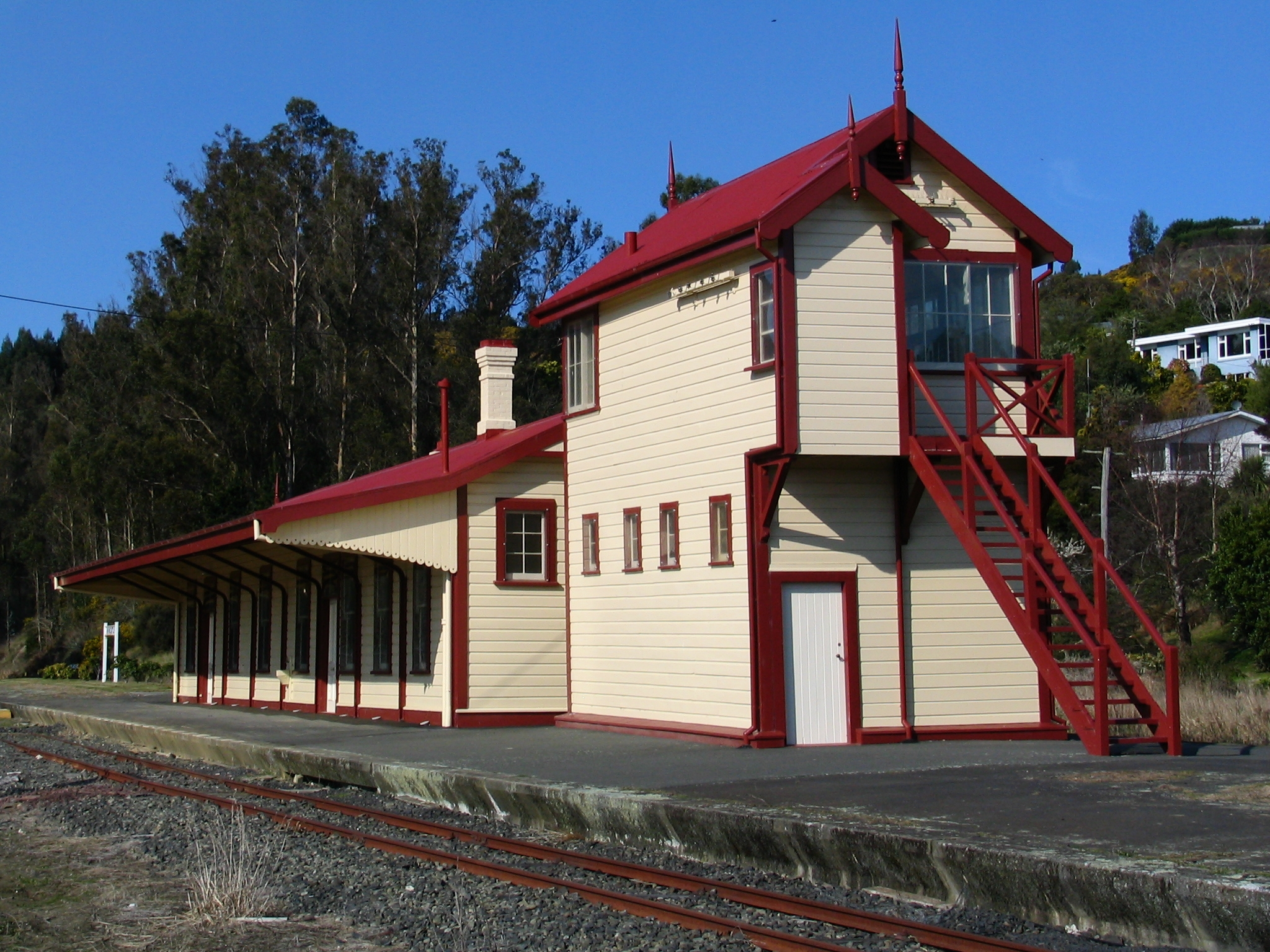
Wingatui island platform type

- Island-platform

Gable-roofed, with, usually identical, doors, windows and verandahs on each side, often with Vintage details. Access was from an overbridge or a subway. e.g. Paekakariki, Plimmerton, Remuera and Wingatui railway station.

- Newmarket in Auckland. Relocated to Parnell Railway Station in 2016–17.

== Political career ==
Troup was the 23rd mayor of Wellington, the capital of New Zealand, from 1927 to 1931, after being a councillor from 1925 (the year he retired from the Railways) to 1927; he was a member of the (anti-Labour) Civic League. He supported many civic improvements, like the widening and paving of many Wellington streets, and the developing of Rongotai Airport (now Wellington Airport) and the National Art Gallery and Museum on the Mount Cook site (the Dominion Museum building, now part of Massey University's Wellington campus). He decided not to stand for a third term as mayor in 1930 for health reasons, though with the Depression there was opposition to municipal spending. He was on many boards, e.g. the Wellington Harbour Board. In the 1931 New Year Honours, Troup was appointed a Companion of the Order of St Michael and St George, for public services.

Troup stood unsuccessfully for the parliamentary seat of Wellington North as the Reform Party candidate in the 1931 election. In 1935, he was awarded the King George V Silver Jubilee Medal, and in the 1937 New Year Honours, he was appointed a Knight Bachelor, for public services.

== Personal life ==
He married Annie Mary Sloan on 3 March 1897 in Wellington. He died in Wellington, survived by his wife, one son and three daughters.

Political offices
Preceded by Charles Norwood	Mayor of Wellington; 1927–1931	Succeeded by Thomas Hislop
