= Wingatui railway station =

Defunct railway station in New Zealand

Coordinates: 45°52′38.94″S 170°23′16.02″E

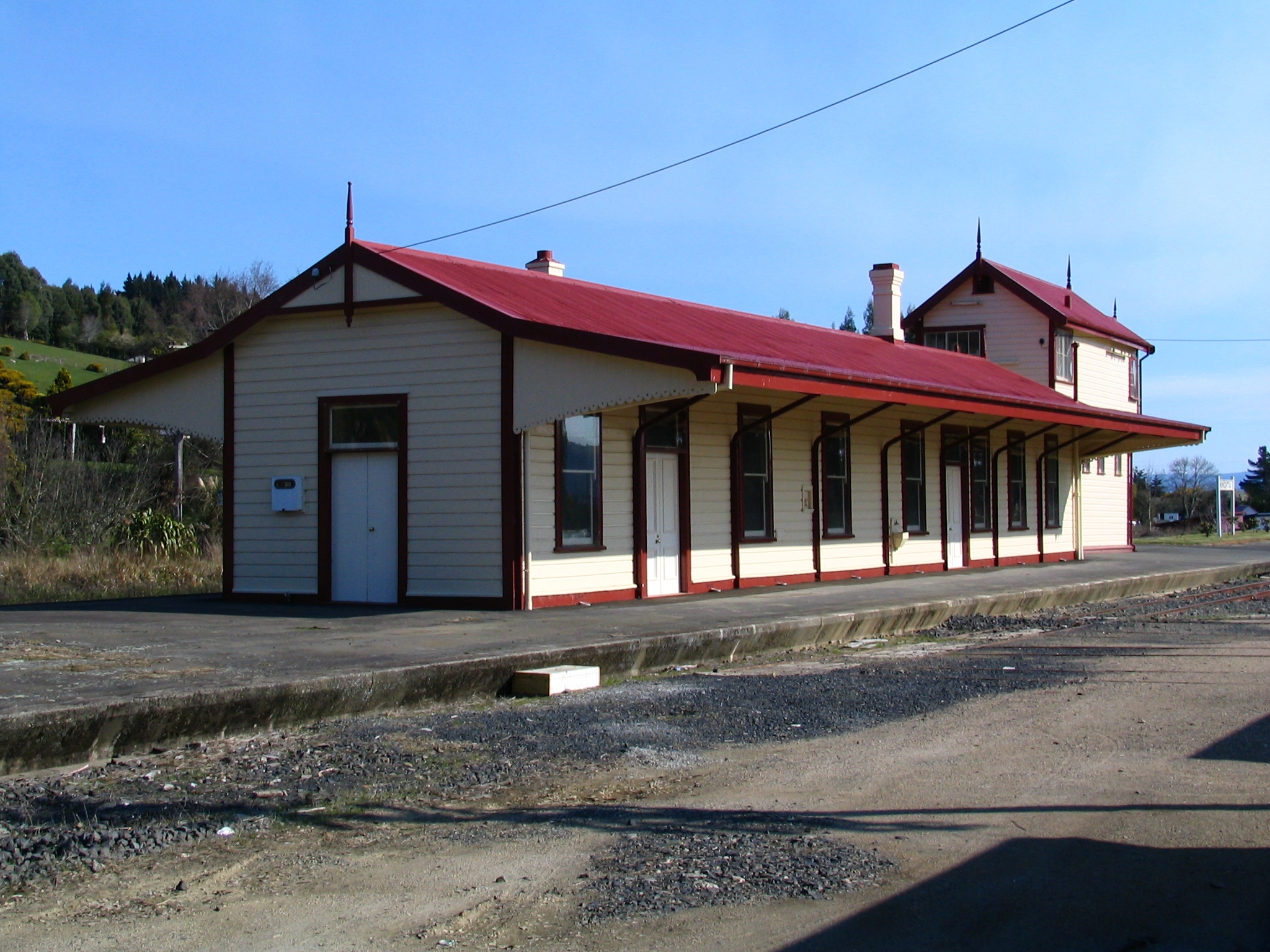
- Wingatui Railway Station, 2009

General information
- Location: Crossan Terrace, Mosgiel; New Zealand
- Line: Main South Line
- Platforms: 2
- Tracks: 1
- Train operators: Dunedin Railways

Construction
- Architect: George Troup
- Architectural style: Troup Island Platform

Other information
- Classification: RHTNZ Category B building

Heritage New Zealand – Category 2
- Designated: 2 July 1982
- Reference no.: 2360
Location

The Wingatui railway station, sometimes known as the Wingatui Junction railway station, is a former station between Dunedin and Mosgiel in Otago, New Zealand. On the Main South Line, it is the junction for the Otago Central Railway (now the Taieri Gorge Railway run by Dunedin Railways)

== History ==
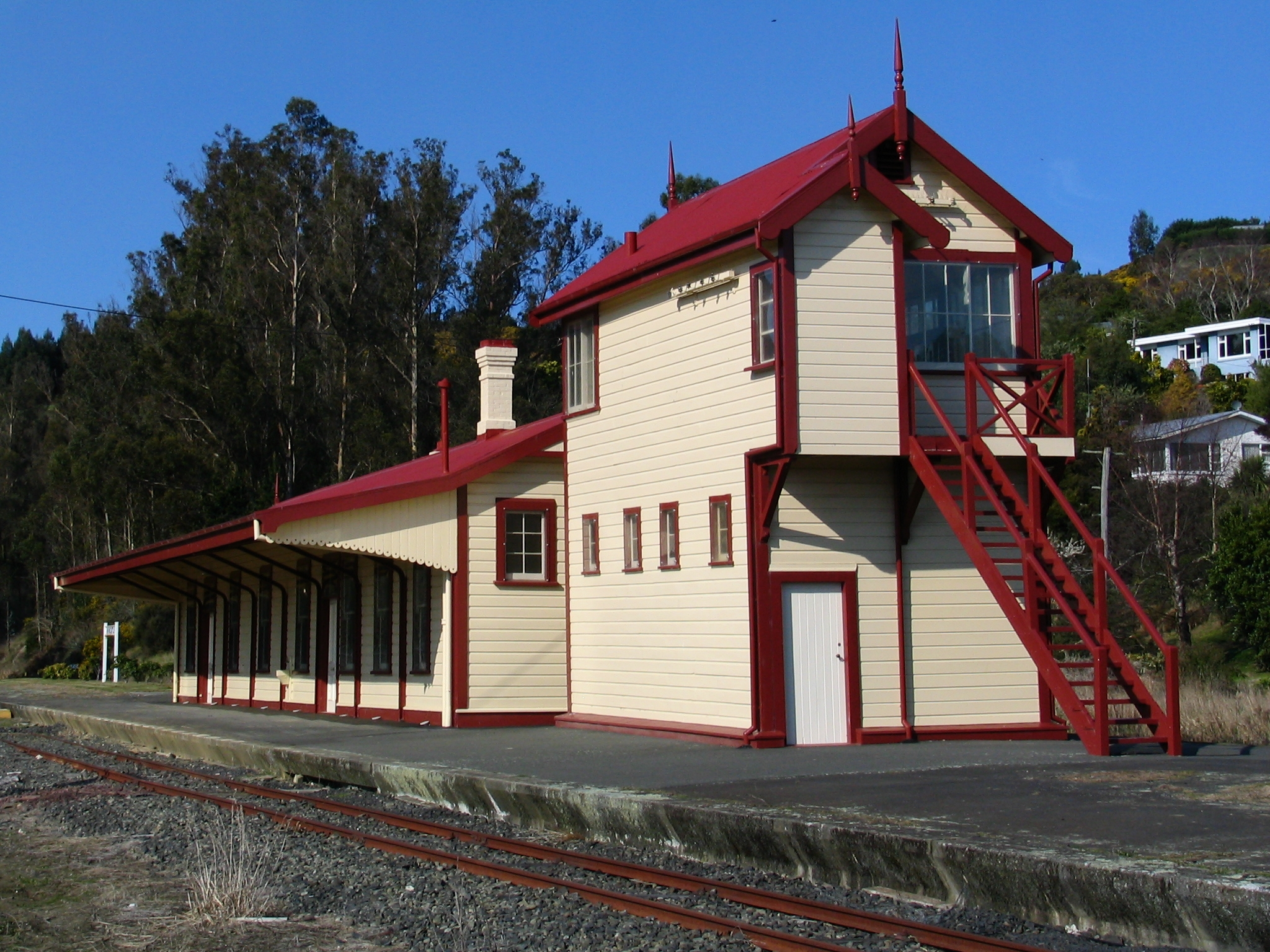
The signal box at the railway station, 2009

The station served the settlement of Wingatui, opening on 1 September 1875, with the present building erected in 1914 was designed by the notable architect George Troup. It closed on 13 August 1983.

It has an island platform, and used to have a platform for the racecourse at Wingatui. This platform was opened in February 1898.

== Heritage listing ==
The station and signal box are listed by the Rail Heritage Trust, as well as Heritage New Zealand, Category II (No. 2360 & No. 2359)
