= Seasider =

Train in New Zealand

The Seasider
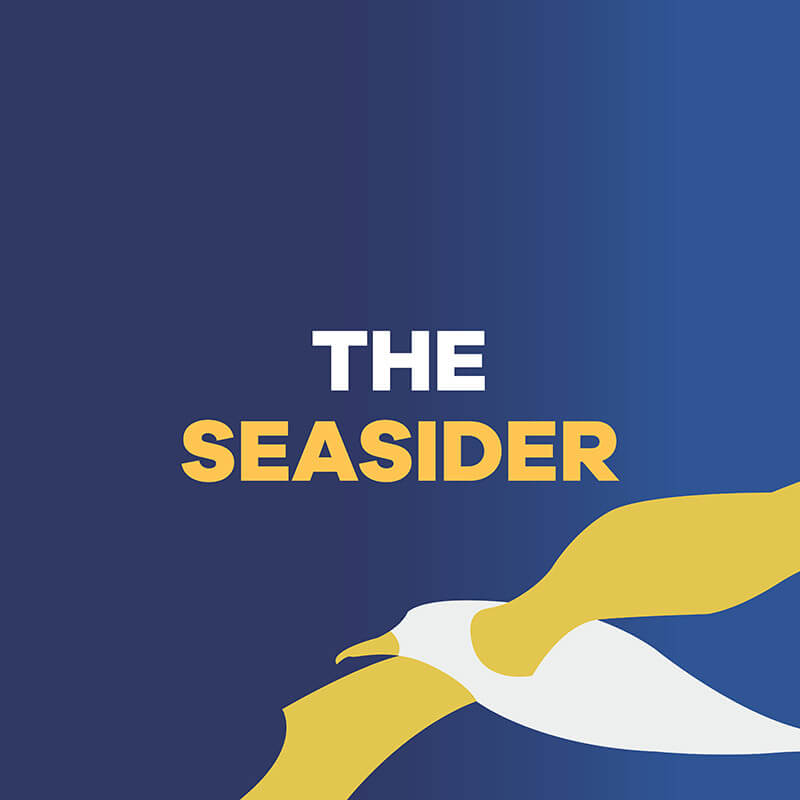

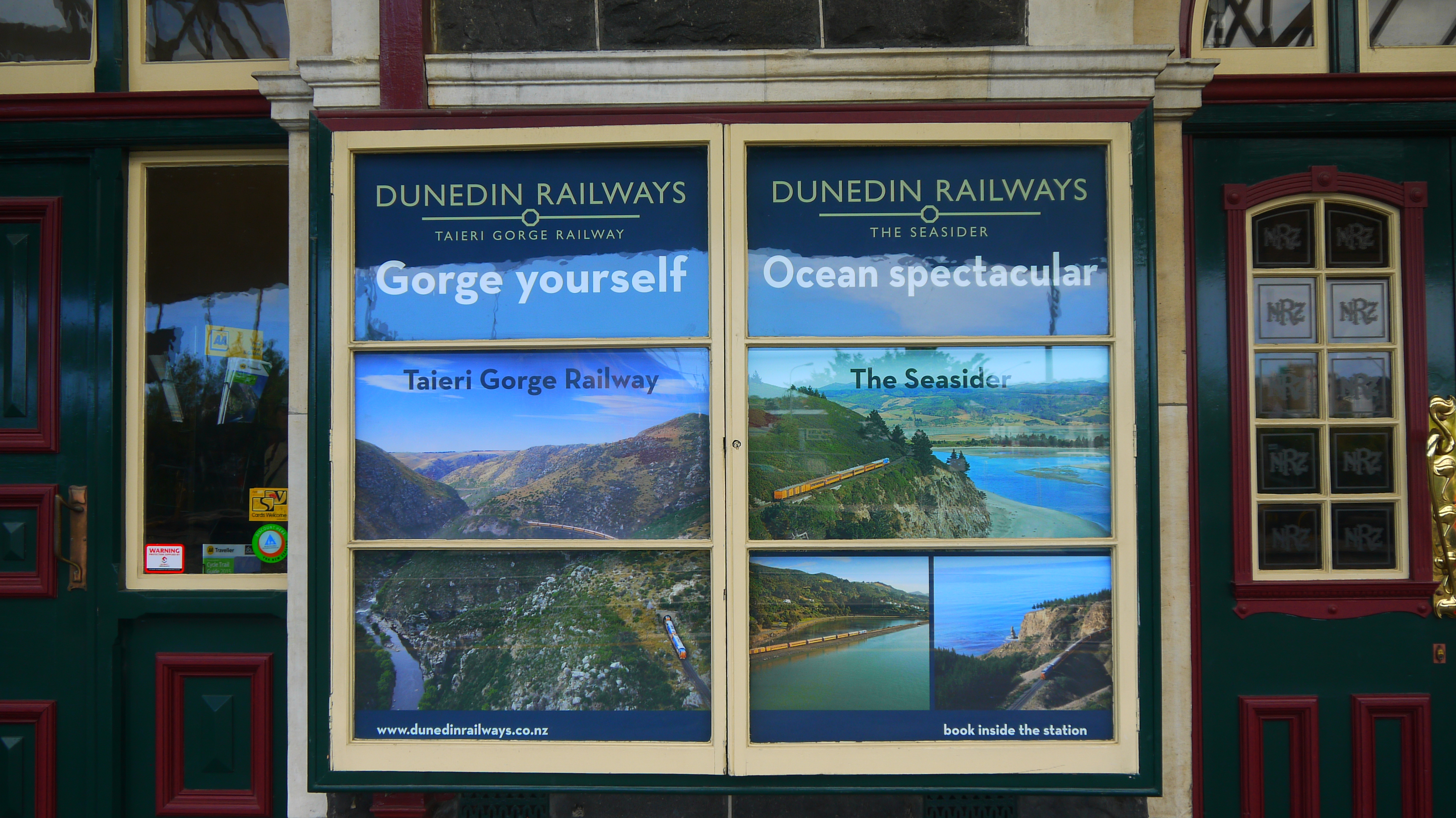
- Seasider (and Taieri Gorge) promo Poster at Dunedin Railway Station on 15 November 2015

Overview
- Service type: Regional rail
- Status: Operational
- First service: 1 September 2002
- Current operator: Dunedin Railways
- Website: dunedinrailways.co.nz/journeys/the-seasider-journey

Route
- Termini: Dunedin Railway Station; Waitati Station
- Average journey time: 1 hour 45 minute
- Line used: South Island Main Trunk Line

Technical
- Track gauge: 1,067 mm (3 ft 6 in)

The Seasider is a tourist train in the South Island of New Zealand, operated by the Dunedin Railways along the Main South Line between the historic Dunedin Railway Station and Waitati once or twice a month. Since the demise of the Southerner on 10 February 2002 it has been the only regular passenger train on this stretch of line.
