= Wingatui Viaduct =

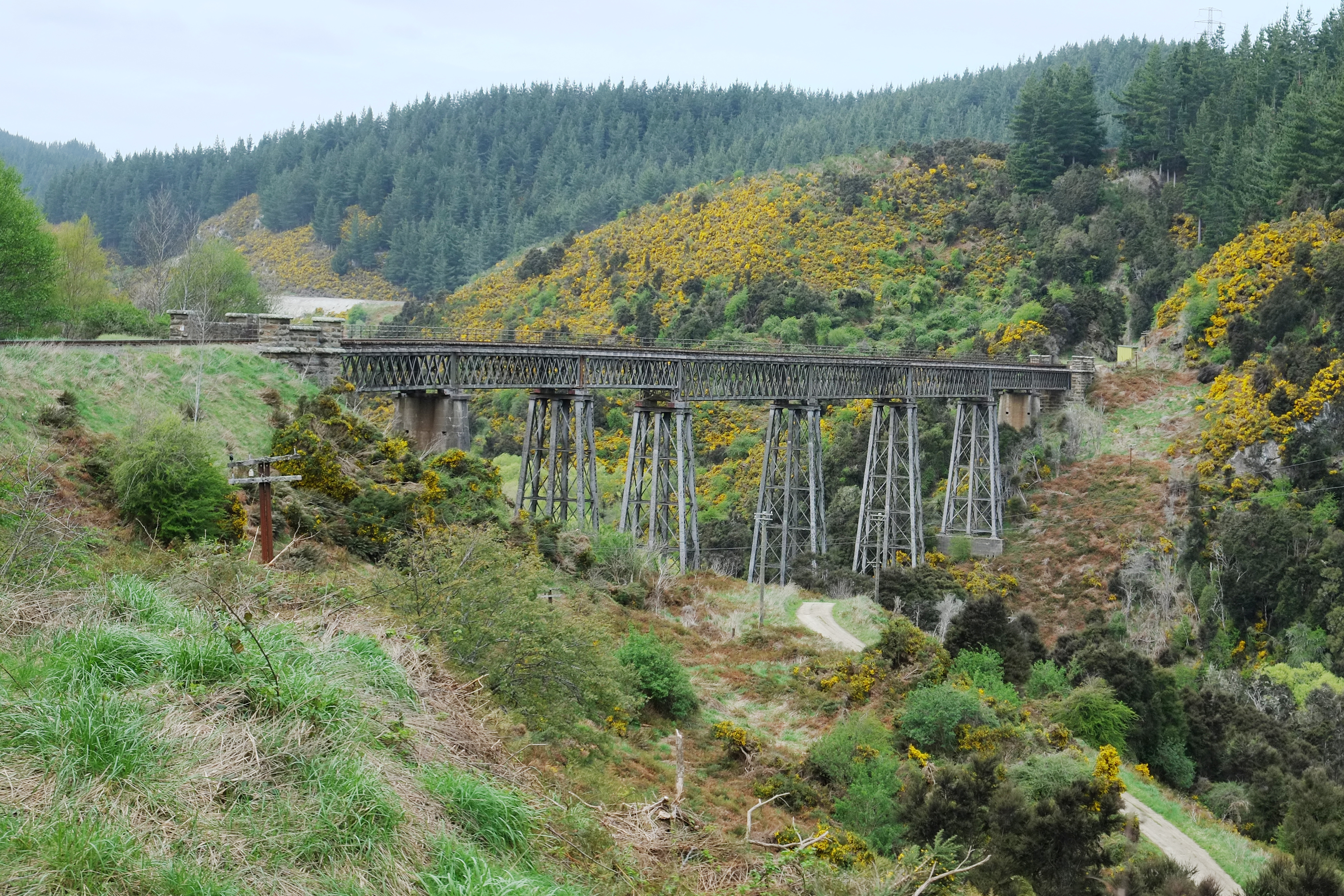
- Wingatui Viaduct crossing Mullocky Gully
- Coordinates: 45°47′55″S 170°19′27″E
- Carries: Former Otago Central Railway (single track)
- Crosses: Mullocky Gully
- Locale: Mullocky Gully, Otago, New Zealand
- Other name: Mullocky Gully Viaduct
- Owner: Dunedin City Holdings Ltd

Characteristics
- Design: Steel lattice deck truss
- Material: Steel
- Total length: 197.5 metres (648 ft)
- Height: 47 metres (154 ft)
- No. of spans: 8

Rail characteristics
- Track gauge: 1,067 millimetres (42.0 in)

History
- Designer: New Zealand Railways Department
- Construction end: 1889

Location
- Interactive map of Wingatui Viaduct

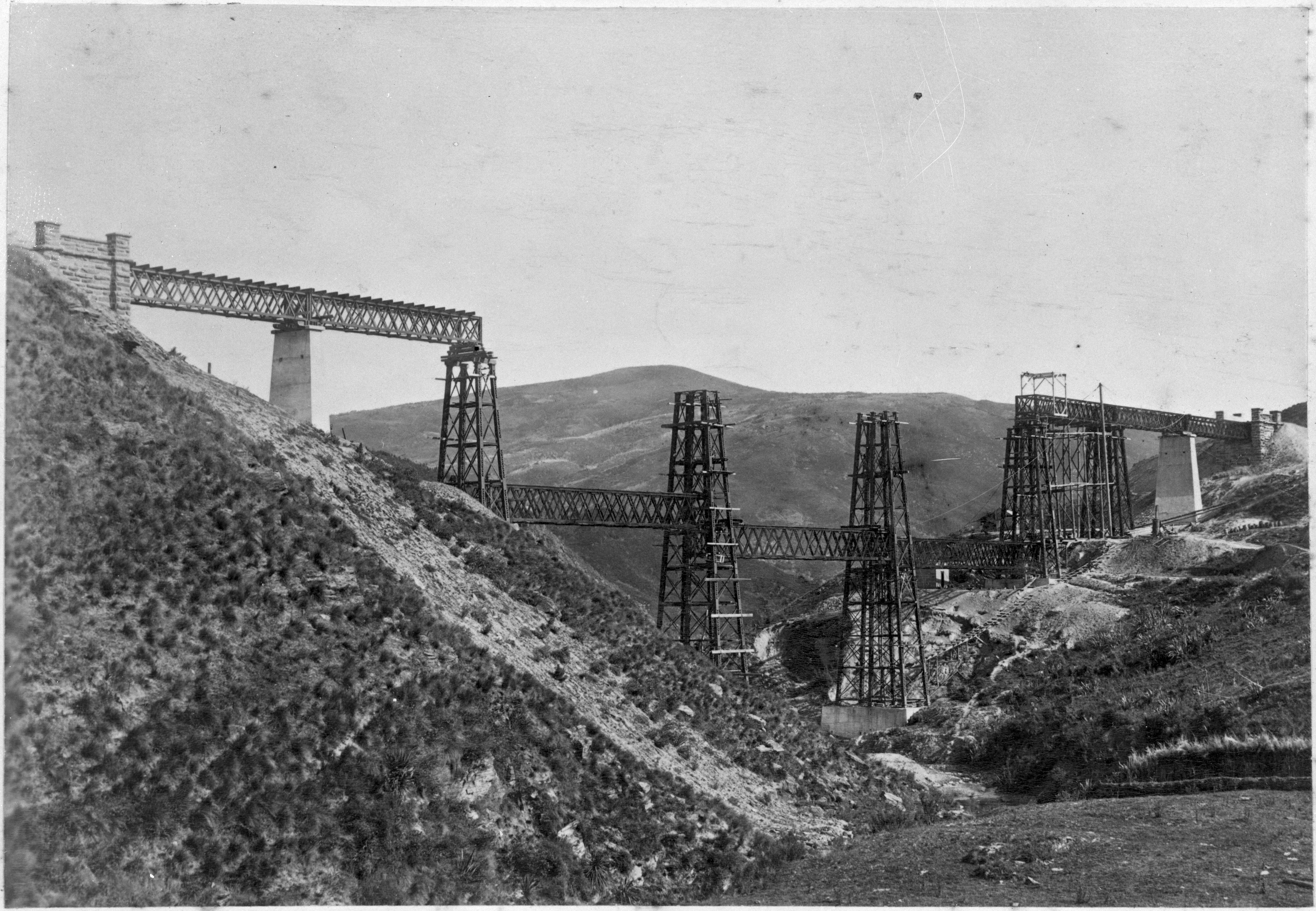
Wingatui Viaduct under construction

The Wingatui Viaduct, also known as the Mullocky Gully Viaduct, is a historic railway viaduct near Wingatui, Otago, New Zealand. Completed in 1889, it carries the former Otago Central Railway across Mullocky Gully and is one of the largest and tallest bridge structures on the line.

The viaduct forms part of the former Otago Central Railway corridor between Dunedin and Central Otago and is crossed by the Taieri Gorge Train, a heritage rail journey operated by Dunedin Railways that takes passengers through Otago’s scenic gorge country and over historic railway infrastructure.

== History ==
The Wingatui Viaduct was constructed as part of the Otago Central Railway, which was built in the late 19th century to support settlement and economic development in Central Otago. Tenders for the construction of the viaduct were called in 1885, and the structure was completed by 1889, enabling the railway to progress beyond the Taieri Plain into the interior.

Contemporary reports described the viaduct as a major engineering work, notable for its height and the scale of its iron construction.

== Design ==
The viaduct is a steel lattice deck truss bridge consisting of eight spans supported by seven piers and two abutments. It has a total length of approximately 197.5 metres (648 ft) and reaches a height of about 47 metres (154 ft) above the gully floor. The structure carries a single 1,067 mm (3 ft 6 in) railway track.

== Condition and maintenance ==
The condition of the Wingatui Viaduct has been assessed as part of wider reviews of structures along the Taieri Gorge railway corridor. An independent engineering audit released in 2022 found that bridges and tunnels along the route were generally in satisfactory condition, though further maintenance and remedial work was recommended for the viaduct.

Subsequent work has included the replacement and strengthening of rail beams, corrosion mitigation, and the installation of structural and environmental monitoring systems to ensure continued safe operation.
