= Taieri Gorge =

Coordinates: 45.732°S 170.357°E

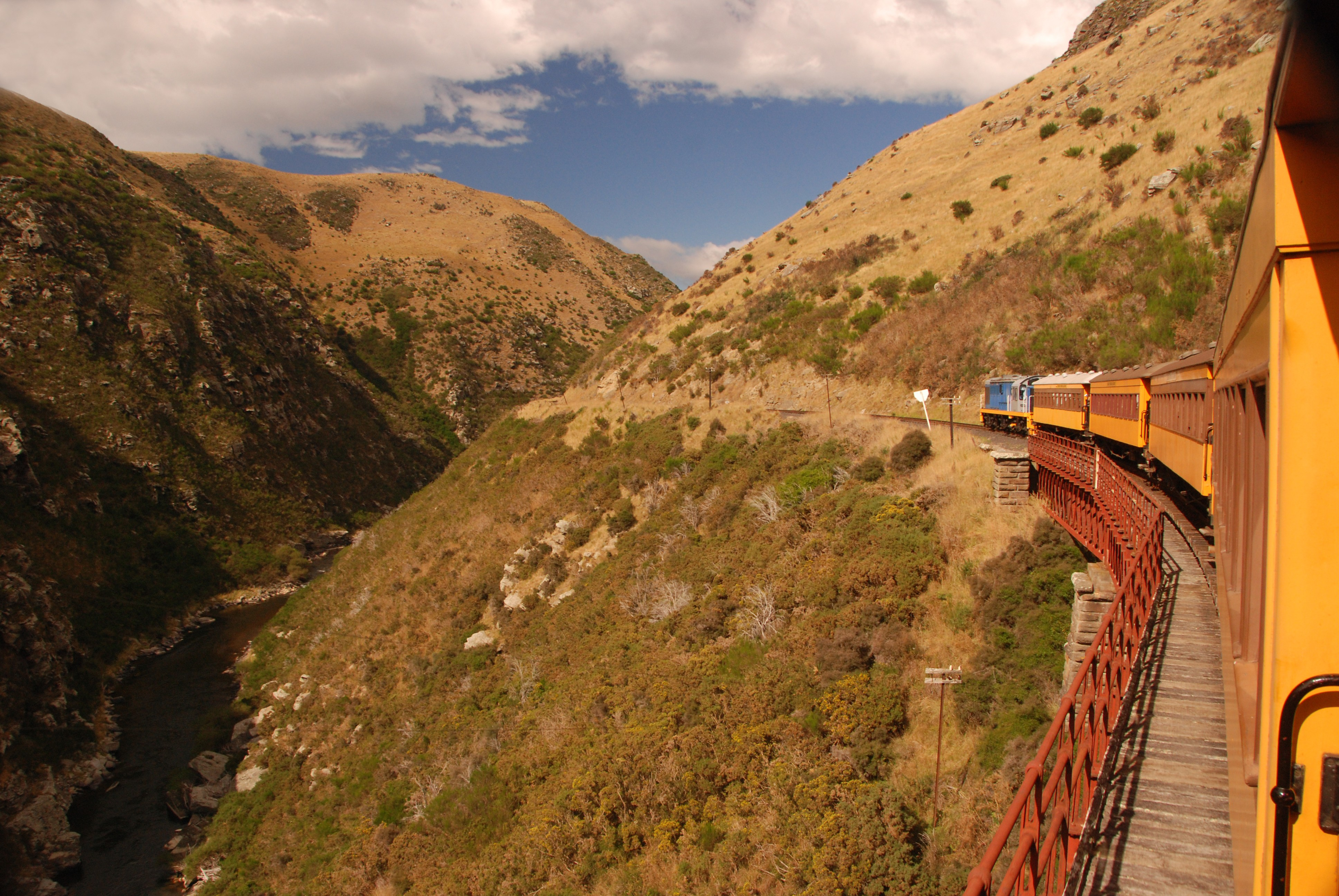
Train travelling through the Taieri Gorge

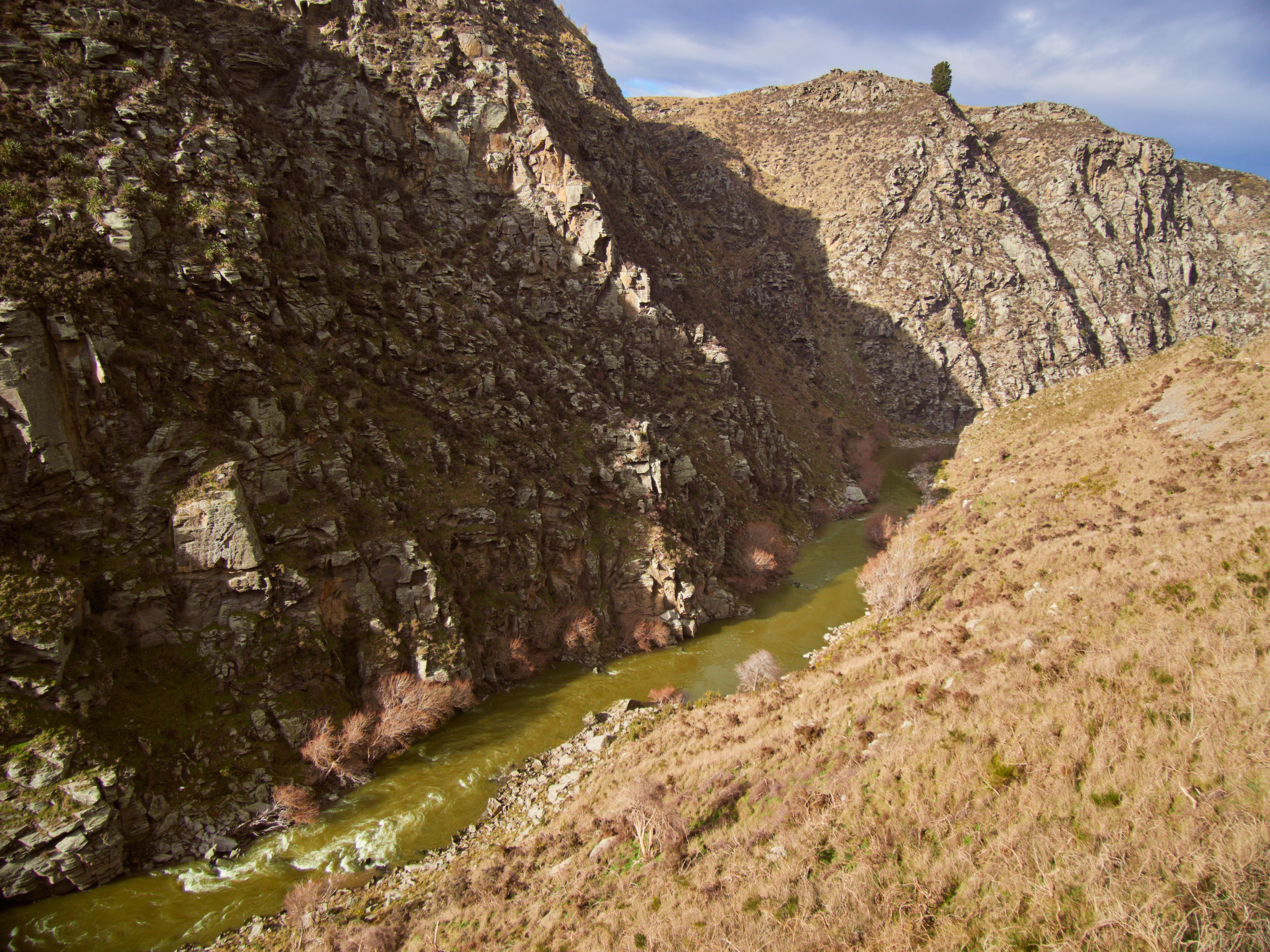
The Taieri River flowing through Taieri Gorge

The Taieri Gorge is located on the Taieri River, in the South Island of New Zealand. It is a deep canyon carved by the Taieri River on the middle stage of its journey from Central Otago to the Pacific Ocean, between the high plateau of the Maniototo and the coastal Taieri Plains. The gorge is over 40 kilometres (25 mi) long and stretches from near Pukerangi to southeast of Outram. A walking track leads from Outram into the southern end of the gorge.

For the upper 25 kilometres (16 mi) of the gorge, upstream from the Wingatui Viaduct, the Taieri Gorge Railway runs alongside (and considerably above) the river.
