= Hindon, New Zealand =

Small settlement in inland Otago, in the South Island of New Zealand

Coordinates: 45°43′40″S 170°18′10″E

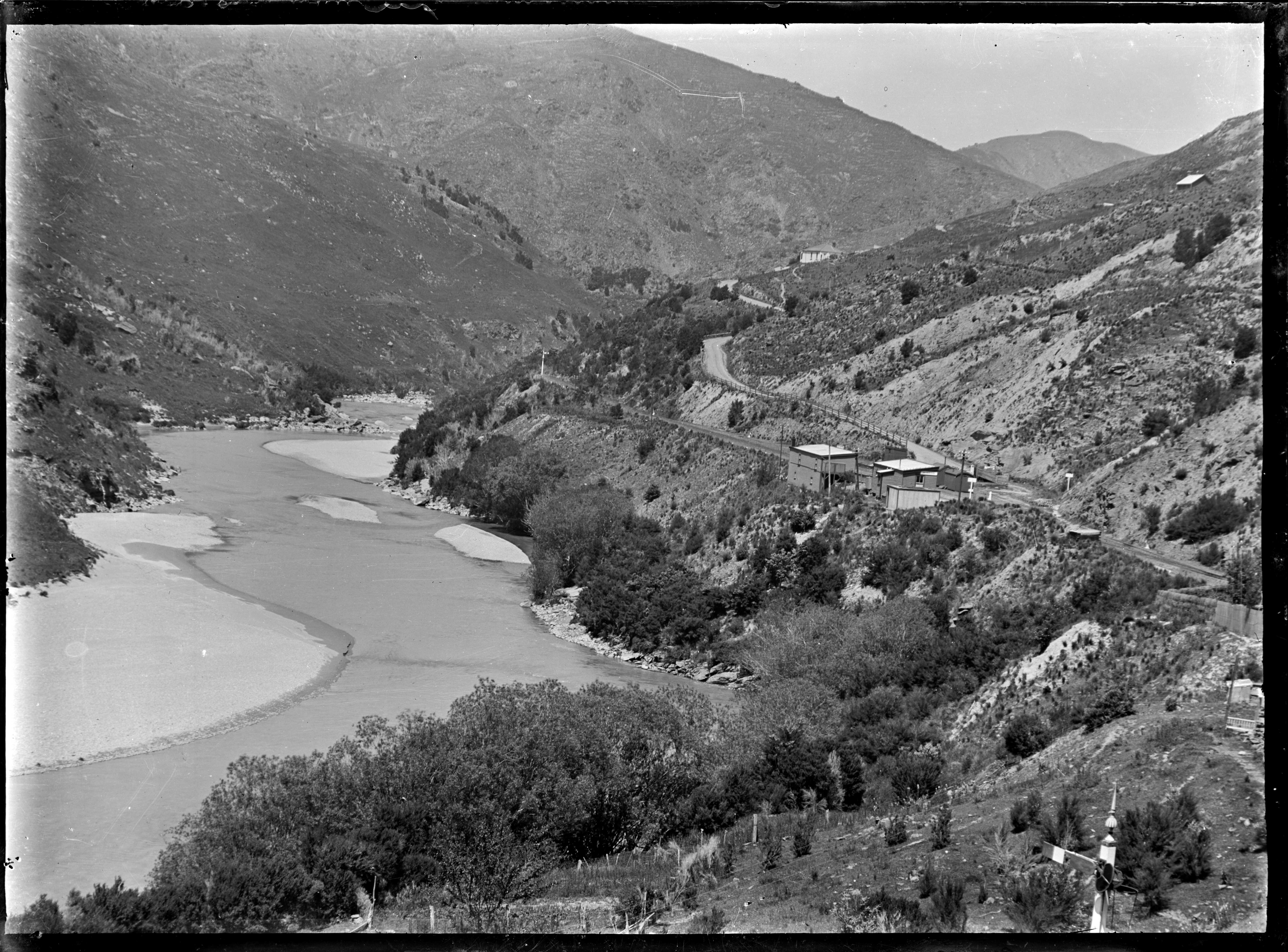
Hindon Railway Station beside the Taieri River circa 1926

Hindon is a small settlement in inland Otago, in the South Island of New Zealand. It is located 24 kilometres (15 mi) northwest of Dunedin in the Silverpeaks Range, close to the edge of the Strath Taieri. The Taieri Gorge Railway runs through Hindon on its way between Dunedin and Middlemarch.

Hindon was named by provincial superintendent John Hyde Harris, who owned land in the area, though the origin of the name is not known. The area was a centre of activity during the latter part of the Otago gold rush, with several mines working the gold-bearing quartz reefs at Hindon and nearby Barewood. The size of the township dwindled markedly after the end of the rush. Little remains of the mines, though some subsided shafts remain as hazards for local farmers.

Hindon has a population of around 70 people. At the height of the gold rush its population was around 1200.

== Climate ==
Climate data for Hindon (1971–2000)
Month	Jan	Feb	Mar	Apr	May	Jun	Jul	Aug	Sep	Oct	Nov	Dec	Year
Mean daily maximum °C (°F)	17.5 (63.5)	17.8 (64.0)	15.8 (60.4)	13.4 (56.1)	9.9 (49.8)	6.9 (44.4)	6.9 (44.4)	8.2 (46.8)	10.7 (51.3)	12.8 (55.0)	14.1 (57.4)	15.9 (60.6)	12.5 (54.5)
Daily mean °C (°F)	12.6 (54.7)	12.9 (55.2)	11.2 (52.2)	9.1 (48.4)	6.2 (43.2)	3.8 (38.8)	3.6 (38.5)	4.6 (40.3)	6.4 (43.5)	8.3 (46.9)	9.6 (49.3)	11.3 (52.3)	8.3 (46.9)
Mean daily minimum °C (°F)	7.6 (45.7)	8.0 (46.4)	6.6 (43.9)	4.8 (40.6)	2.5 (36.5)	0.6 (33.1)	0.4 (32.7)	0.9 (33.6)	2.2 (36.0)	3.8 (38.8)	5.1 (41.2)	6.7 (44.1)	4.1 (39.4)
Average rainfall mm (inches)	80 (3.1)	46 (1.8)	57 (2.2)	59 (2.3)	61 (2.4)	47 (1.9)	51 (2.0)	42 (1.7)	36 (1.4)	45 (1.8)	62 (2.4)	65 (2.6)	651 (25.6)
Source: NIWA (rainfall 1951–1980)
