= Dunedin Railways Limited =

Railway operator in New Zealand

Coordinates: 45°52′31″S 170°30′32″E

Overview
- Headquarters: Dunedin, New Zealand
- Locale: Eastern Otago, New Zealand
- Dates of operation: 21 February 1987–present
- Predecessor: New Zealand Railways Corporation

Technical
- Track gauge: 1,067 mm (3 ft 6 in)

Other
- Website: www.dunedinrailwaystation.co.nz

Dunedin Railways Limited (formerly Dunedin Railways and Taieri Gorge Railway) is the registered name of Dunedin Railway Station, an operator of a railway line and tourist trains based at Dunedin Railway Station in the South Island of New Zealand. The company is a council-controlled trading organisation wholly owned by Dunedin City Council through its holding company Dunedin City Holdings Limited.

== History ==
=== Formation ===
Taieri Gorge Limited logo, formerly used as the logo for Taieri Gorge Railway Ltd.

The Otago Excursion Train Trust was formed in 1978 to operate excursions on the Otago Central Railway line, running its first train in October 1979. The services grew in popularity and the Trust realised by the 1980s that it had great tourist potential. New carriages were acquired with the "Taieri Gorge Limited" launching on 21 February 1987.

On 19 December 1989, the New Zealand Railways Corporation announced the closure of the Otago Central railway line beyond Taieri owing to a lack of freight traffic following the completion of the Clyde Dam. Dunedin City Council then stepped in, purchasing the line as far as Middlemarch and five locomotives, which were then leased by the Trust to run its trains. The Trust continued to operate the Taieri Gorge Limited, now with its own locomotives (DJ class locomotives withdrawn by NZR in the same year), but needed a further NZ$1 million to fund its operations. A community appeal in 1990 raised NZ$1.2 million. The line beyond Middlemarch on the Otago Central Branch was lifted during 1991, and the trackbed handed over to the Department of Conservation in 1993. It is now the Otago Central Rail Trail, a major cycling tourist attraction in the area.

=== Local Authority Trading Enterprise ===
On 8 March 1995, the Dunedin City Council (through its holding company Dunedin City Holdings Limited) and the Trust incorporated a new company, Taieri Gorge Railway Limited. Dunedin City Holdings was a majority shareholder (72.03%) and the Trust held the balance of the shares (27.97%). The company operated as a Council-controlled organisation (formerly known as a Local-authority trading enterprise) under Part 5 of the Local Government Act 2002. This was due to the need to raise more capital to finance the expansion of the Trusts operation. Dunedin City Council then sold the railway line to the new company, and the Trust sold its locomotives, carriages and other assets to the new company. The company is governed according to its constitution by a board of directors comprising six people. Two of these people were selected by Dunedin City Holdings Limited, two by the Otago Excursion Train Trust and two jointly by both shareholding parties. On 1 December 2017, the company changed its name to Dunedin Railways Limited.

=== Taieri Gorge Limited ===
The Taieri Gorge Limited is New Zealand's longest tourist railway and stretches along the former Otago Central Railway from the 4 km (2.5 mi) peg on the Taieri Branch, 18 km (11 mi) west of Dunedin, to Middlemarch, a distance of 60 kilometres (37 mi). Between Dunedin and the start of the line, its trains operate on KiwiRail's Main South Line.

Dunedin Railway Station currently operates on a reduced schedule. The Inlander runs through the Taieri Gorge to Hindon, The Seasider runs up the coast through Waitati to Seacliff, and The Victorian is an all-day trip to the North Otago town of Oamaru. Special services also run, including the Christmas Inlander in December and the addition of Quiz Trains in 2023. 2024 saw the addition of The Stargazer, a trip to Hindon for an evening of star gazing hosted by the Dunedin Astronomical Society.

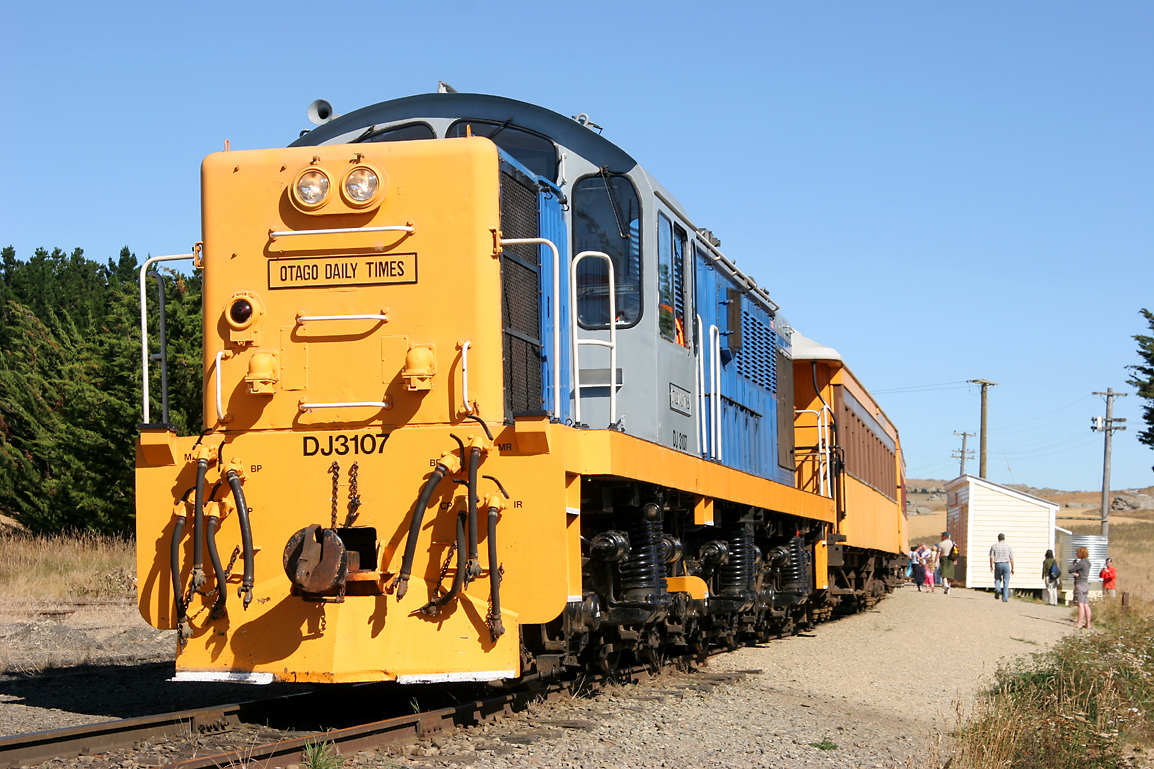
DJ class locomotive in service with Dunedin Railways at Pukerangi.

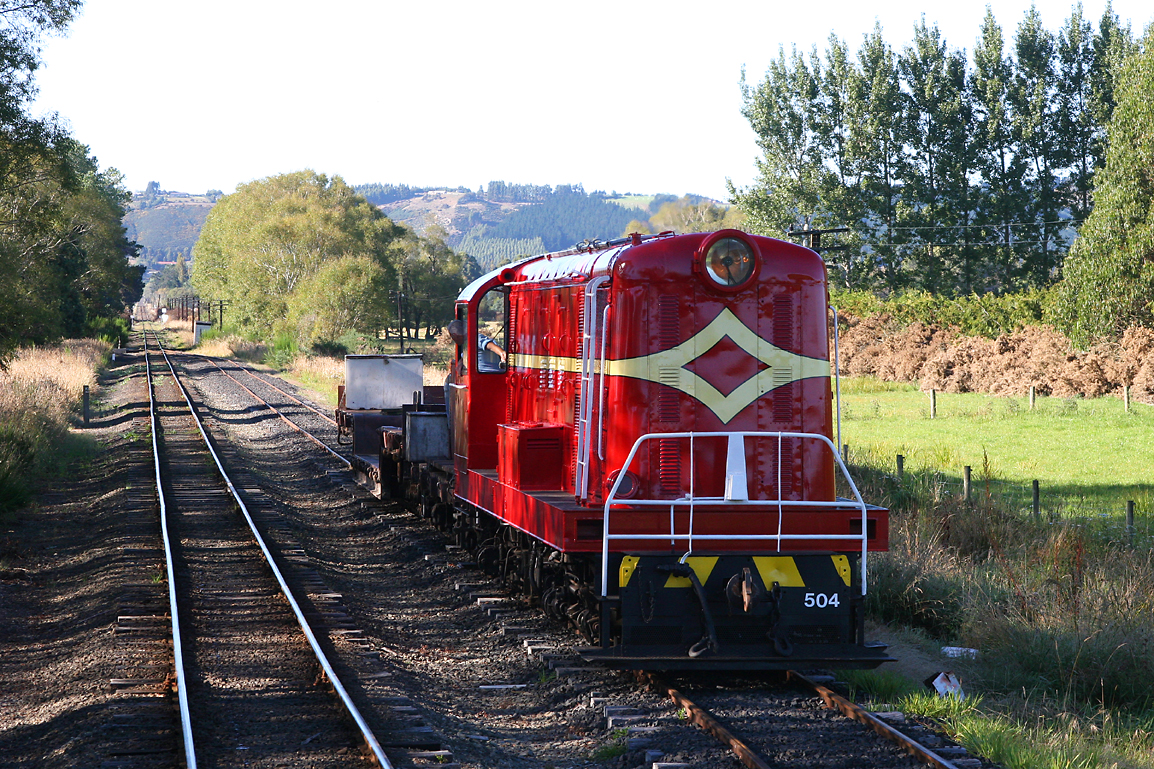
DE class locomotive on the railway.

=== Seasider and Dunedin Silver Fern ===
Dunedin Railways also operates the Seasider tourist train along the coast to Waitati, north of Dunedin. Following the withdrawal of the Southerner by Tranz Scenic in 2002, it is the only passenger train on the Main South Line.

In 2012, Dunedin Railways leased one of the Silver Fern class railcars from KiwiRail for use on the same route as the Seasider.

Dunedin Railways logo introduced with the 2014 rebrand

=== Rebranded Dunedin Railways ===
On 23 October 2014, the Taieri Gorge Railway announced that it would be changing its name to Dunedin Railways. For 35 years, the Taieri Gorge Railway and the Otago Excursion Train Trust had taken tourists on scenic rail excursions up the Taieri Gorge to Middlemarch and more recently up the coast, north of Dunedin on the Seasider. The reason for the change was so that tourists can link the train trips to Dunedin and it makes it much clearer what the railway is. AO 77 was the first carriage to be repainted into their new blue livery with their name on the sides in October 2014. This was followed by A 3022 and AG 239. In September 2015, A^{L} 1695 was repainted into their yellow version of livery.

=== Mothballing ===
On 20 April 2020, the company announced that due to the COVID-19 pandemic in New Zealand, it mothballed its track and equipment. The company said up to 80% of its revenue came from international tourists. The mothballing could affect up to 51 jobs.

=== Reactivation and restructure ===
Following the decision to mothball Dunedin Railways, the Otago Excursion Train Trust sold its shares in the company to the council in April 2020.

In May 2021, Dunedin City Council agreed to keep the Taieri Gorge line as far as Hindon in operation, as well as services on KiwiRail's railway lines. In November 2021, the council agreed to extend support through to 2024. In 2023, the council decided to reactivate the Hindon-Middlemarch section as well.

=== Rebranded as Dunedin Railway Station ===
On the 24th of April 2026, Otago Daily Times revealed that Dunedin Railways had rebranded to Dunedin Railway Station. Having an identical name to the historic station itself, which the company operates from. This drew public attention due to the potential confusion that this might cause.

== Financial performance ==
In the financial year to June 2017, Dunedin Railways had revenues of NZ$6.578m and expenses of NZ$6.387m, and turned a profit of NZ$137,000. Following the COVID-19 pandemic of 2021, Dunedin Railways was losing NZ$1.5 million per annum.

In 2024, Dunedin Railways reported a net surplus of $1.141m, up from a net deficit of $1.355m in 2023.

== Locomotives and railcars ==
The railway owns seven former New Zealand Railways D^{J} class locomotives, four of which are currently operational and certified for mainline operation. They are painted in a variant of the modified New Zealand Railways scheme carried by the class in the 1980s, where the low nose sides are painted blue instead of yellow and grey cab front. Two locomotives are in an operational condition, but are not currently certified for mainline use; a seventh, DJ3021 (ex-D^{J} 1202), is being stored, pending future restoration after it was purchased from its former home at Ranfurly station where it was a static display. An eighth, DJ3044 (D^{J} 1204) was acquired from Mainline Steam in 2012 as a source of spare parts and has been dismantled. Both were painted in the modified blue scheme and were purchased in a withdrawn condition.

TGR also operates one D^{E} class locomotive, D^{E} 504 (TMS DE1337). This locomotive was acquired from Otago Polytechnic (who had acquired it from New Zealand Railways Corporation) in the early 1990s and is not mainline certified, instead of being based at the TGR works depot at the 4 km peg. It previously carried a modified International Orange scheme but was repainted in 2006 to its original livery of Carnation Red with the addition of "wasp stripes" on the headstocks as it would have carried in the 1970s.

In 2013, Dunedin Railways leased Silver Fern railcar RM24 from KiwiRail and operated this on trips between Dunedin and Waitati. The railcar was returned to KiwiRail in 2019.

Dunedin Railways formerly operated a shunting locomotive, T^{R} 111 at their Dunedin depot as their resident shunting locomotive. This locomotive was obtained by the Otago Excursion Train Trust in 2009 from enthusiast Reid McNaught, who had leased the locomotive to Dunedin Railways since 2006. It was sold to the Canterbury Railway Society in July 2015.

== Carriages ==
=== 47' 6" wooden body carriages ===
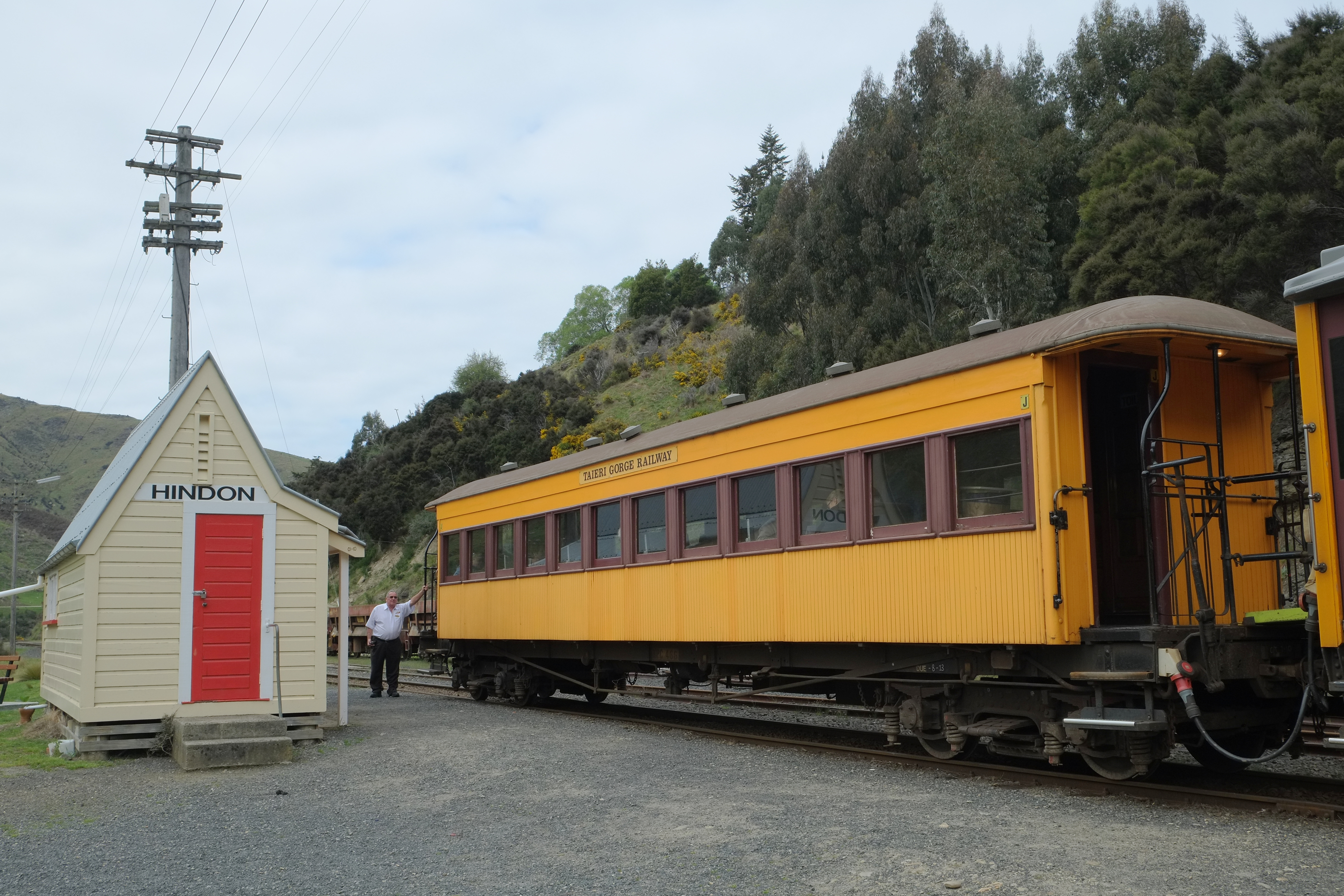
47" 6' foot carriage at Hindon.

All trains as of January 2017 include some of Dunedin Railways five former New Zealand Railways 47 ft 6 in (14.48 m) wooden-clad carriages. These cars are known as "Scarrett'" heritage carriages and were built between 1912 and 1923 with open platform ends, gangways and 37 seats. Dunedin Railways has started retiring these carriages largely to provide bogies for their 56-foot (17 m) carriage stock, which did not have their own bogies when they were purchased. Two of the 47-foot cars have been sold, while two were scrapped circa 1978. One carriage, A 1254, is owned by the Ocean Beach Railway (OBR) and is leased to Dunedin Railways. This carriage will be returned to the OBR at the conclusion of its lease.

=== 50-foot carriages ===
Dunedin Railways has currently three steel-clad and one wood-clad NZR 50-foot carriages (15 m), formerly used on Dunedin suburban trains and express passenger trains. The steel-clads have 30-37 seats, enclosed vestibules and covered gangways and were built by New Zealand Railways Department in 1931–40. One of these is an AL class car-van with a small luggage compartment at one end while the other two are A class carriages. Steel-clad cars, A class 50159 and 50223 were sold to the Weka Pass Railway in 2008 and AL 50090 was sold to the Midland Rail Heritage Trust in 2013. The wood-clad carriages are A 1327, built in 1913, with open vestibules and non-covered gangways.

=== Jungle Gym panorama carriages ===
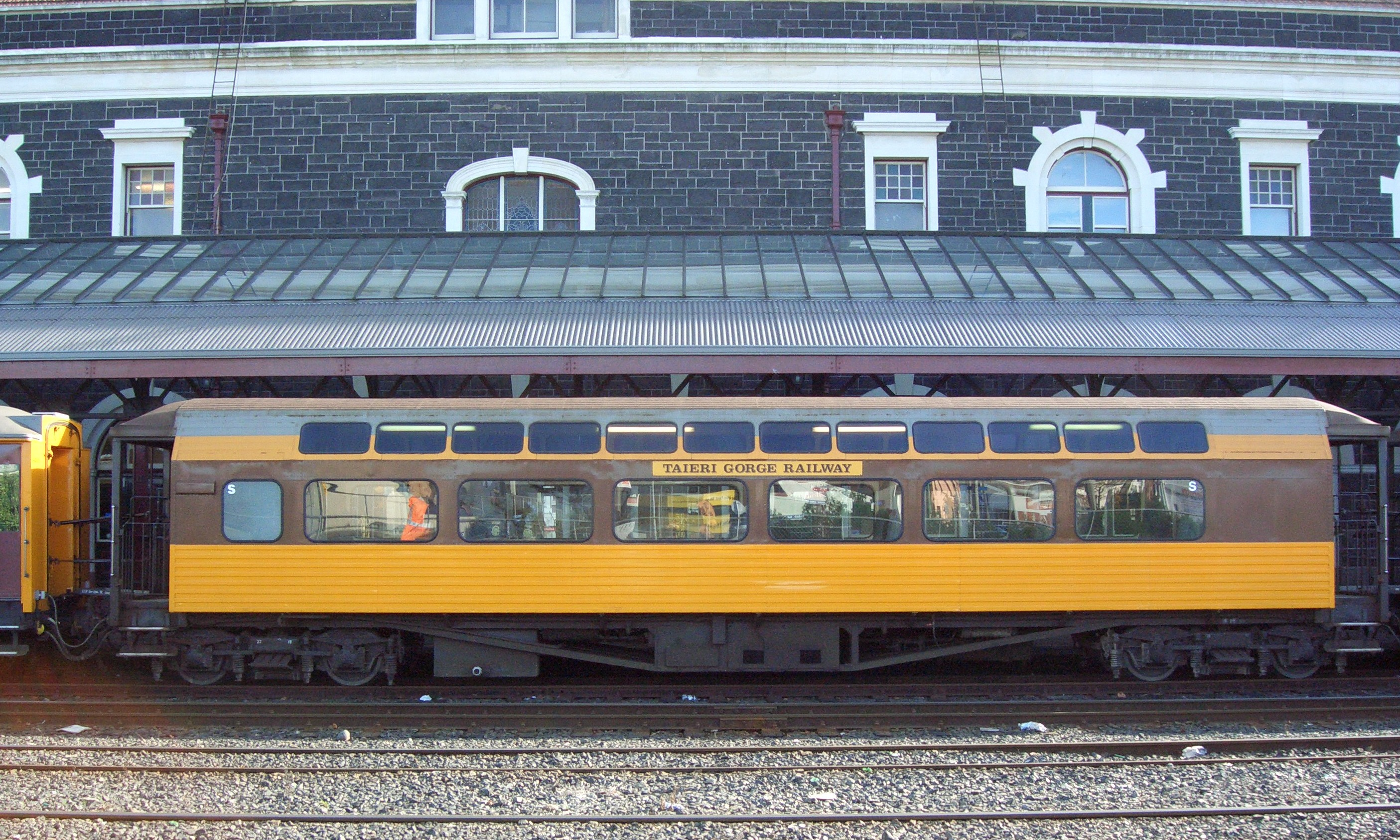
In-house built panorama car at Dunedin Railway Station.

Dunedin Railways has three all-steel air-conditioned panorama carriages with open platform ends and open gangways, known locally as "Jungle Gyms" due to the nature of their framework when under construction. These were designed and built by the OETT in 1987–92, with a "very distinctive shape to fit the tunnels". Two of these carriages were built on Z class "roadsider" freight van underframes while the third was built on the underframe of guard's van F 529.

=== 56-foot carriages ===
In September 2007, the Taieri Gorge Railway announced that it had purchased 12 NZR 56-foot carriages (17 m) formerly used on the Wairarapa Connection. The first of these, A 2325, was prepared at a cost of $45,000 and was ready in September 2008. The company anticipated having three carriages in service by the end of 2008, and all 12 by 2013. The upgrade included new seating, carpets, toilets and external paint. The railway intends to refurbish three carriages each year. As of December 2015, only five out of the twelve carriages have been restored. Two of these carriages have since been disposed of.

In 2012, panoramic window car AO 77 was leased from KiwiRail. It has since been repainted in Dunedin Railways' blue livery and is now under their ownership. Privately owned A 3022 is leased from its owners since 2013. In 2018, Dunedin Railways purchased six big-window AO/ASO class carriages from KiwiRail. Two of these have since been converted to all-steel framing and reclassified as ADR.

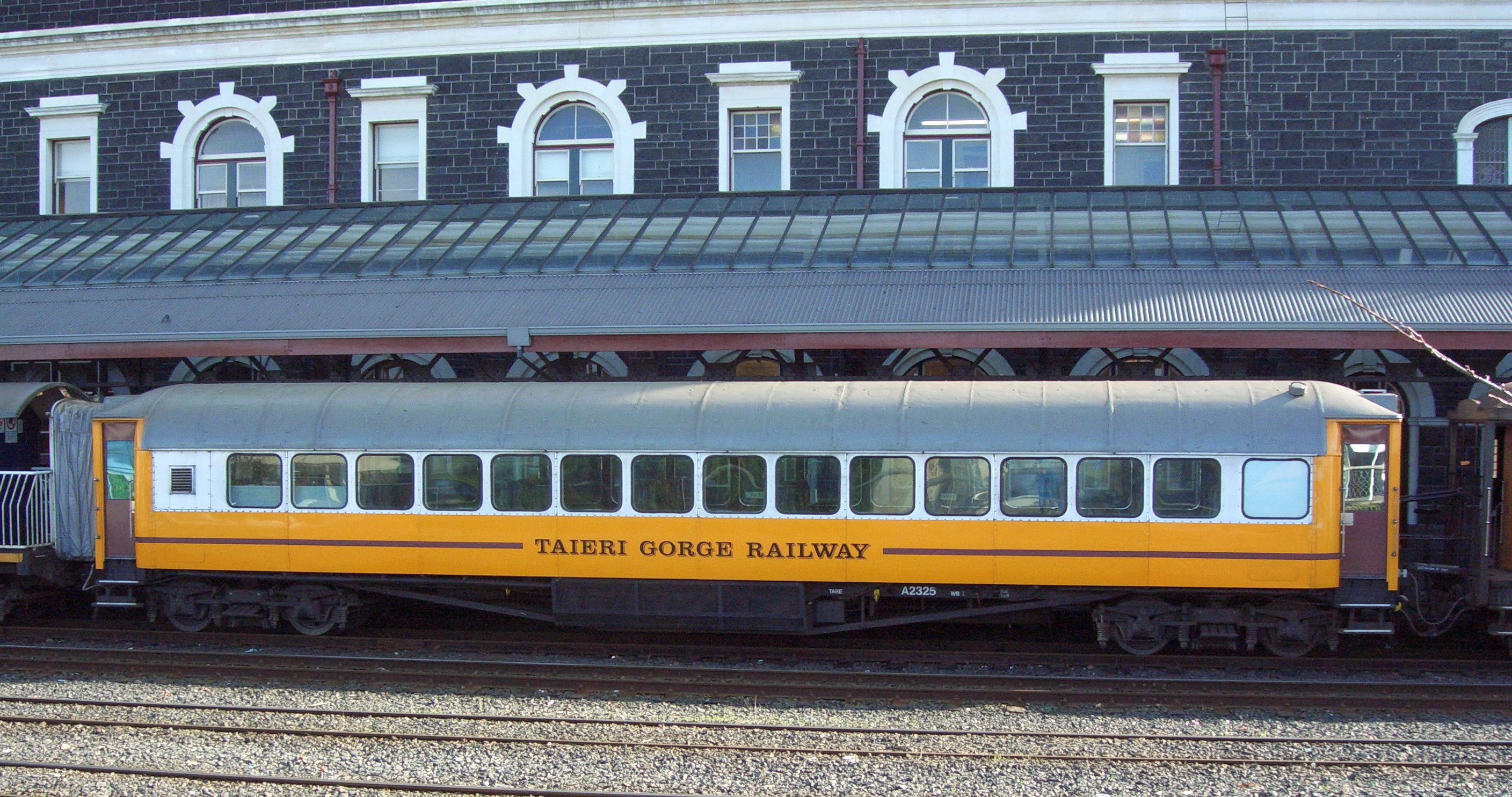
Former NZR 56-foot carriage at Dunedin Railway Station.

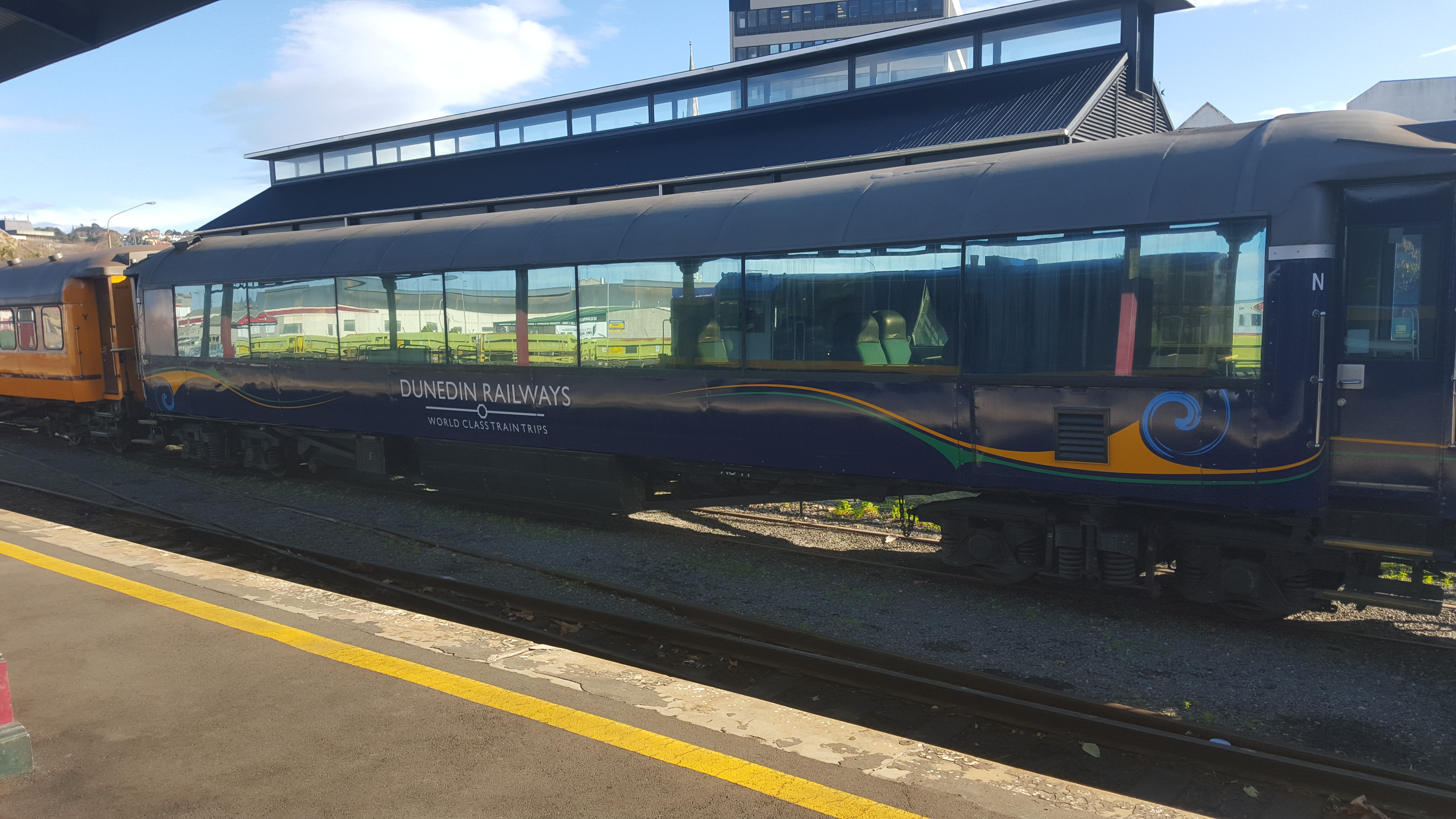
Dunedin Railways branded AO class carriage at Dunedin Railway Station.

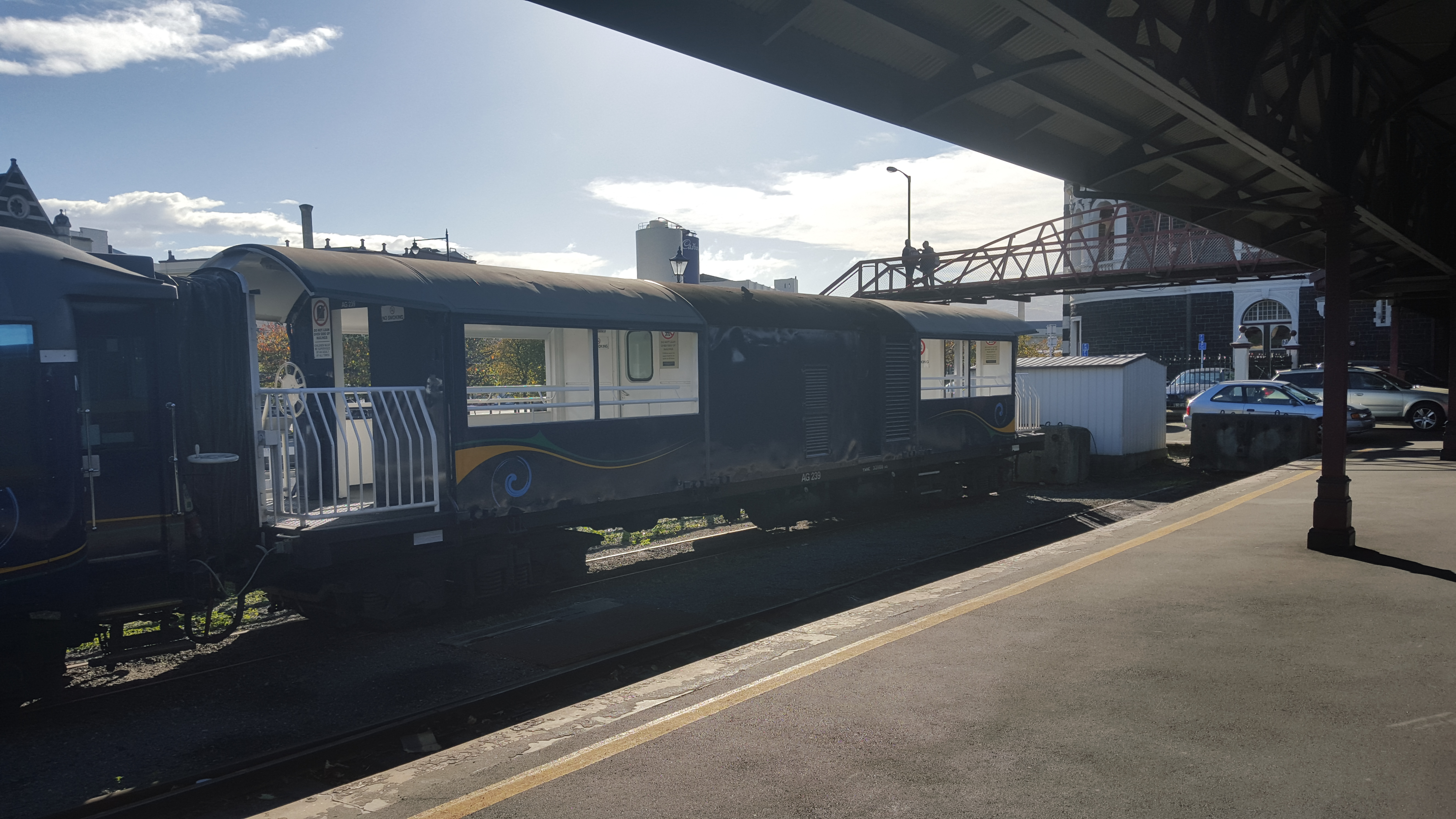
Dunedin Railways AG class observation van at Dunedin Railway Station, 20 May 2016.

== Freight haulage ==
In the early 2000s, the TGR investigated the possibility of introducing log haulage between Mount Allan and Port Chalmers at the end of the Port Chalmers Branch. However, on 12 June 2007, it was announced that a cost difference of NZ$5 million existed between road and rail haulage in favour of road, and potential government subsidies were insufficient to close the gap. The announcement was met with disappointment by the Dunedin City Council, which favourably viewed the rail option as it was more environmentally friendly and would have reduced traffic congestion.

It has since been worked out that with extra damage caused by the logging trucks on the Mosgiel to Port Chalmers road that it would have been cheaper to perform the operation by rail, but despite pleas by the local council, Wenita, the relevant company, said it had invested too much in the road option to change its plans.

The route's loading gauge restricts the maximum size of rolling stock that can operate on the railway; some freight wagons cannot use the line.

== See also ==
- Rail transport in New Zealand
- Otago Central Rail Trail
