= Evansdale =

Evansdale can mean:

- Evansdale, Edmonton, a neighbourhood in Edmonton, Alberta, Canada
- Evansdale, Iowa, United States
- Evansdale, New Zealand
- Evansdale Campus, West Virginia University
- Evansdale Cheese, a cheese producer in New Zealand
- Evansdale statistical district, a census-gathering district covering a large area of rural East Otago, New Zealand
