= Leith Saddle =

Saddle in New Zealand

Coordinates: 45.800094°S 170.516081°E

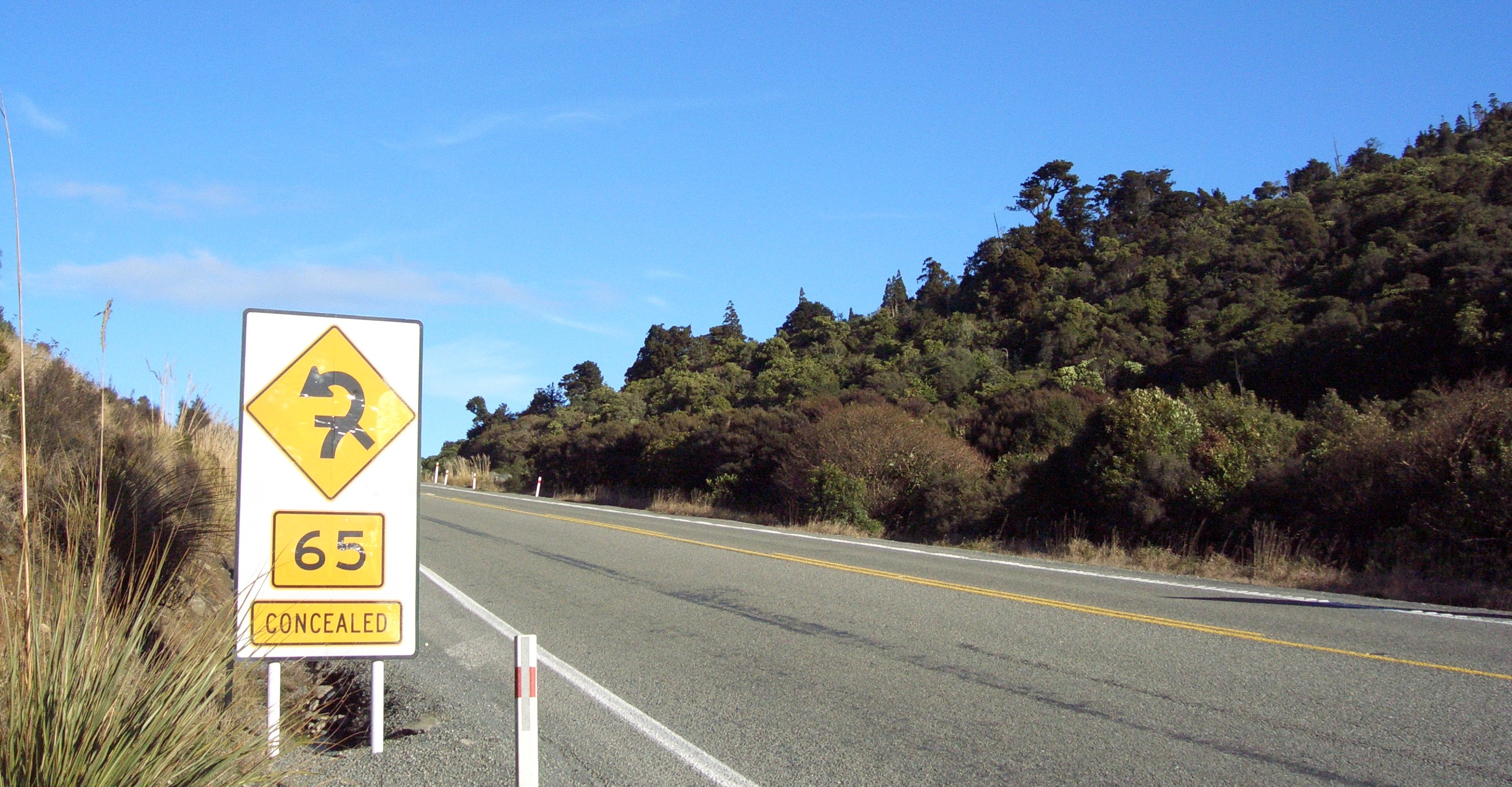
Leith Saddle near Dunedin, New Zealand

Leith Saddle is a saddle between the sources of the Water of Leith and the Waitati River, approximately halfway between Dunedin's northern suburb of Pine Hill and the outlying settlement of Waitati. At 380m the saddle is the highest point of Dunedin-Waitati Highway, and therefore of State Highway 1 in the South Island. It traverses a fragile alpine forest. Proposed road works to straighten a dangerous corner here conflict with conservation values. Water supply pipelines, and tramping and cycling routes also converge at the saddle.

The Water of Leith's source is 100 metres to the south of Leith Saddle, at a height of 380 metres above sea level.

The Leith Saddle Track is a 3.5 hour climb through native cloud forest to Swampy Spur and Swampy Summit with links to other walkways in the Silverpeaks and Dunedin's hills.

The highway has an at-grade intersection at the Leith Saddle summit with Leith Valley Road and Waitati Valley Road. Both have low motor vehicle volumes and have metalled surfaces, making them attractive to cyclists.

Transit New Zealand signalled a long term intention in 2004 to realign SH1 in the vicinity of Leith Saddle; construction would require removal of some old-growth forest.

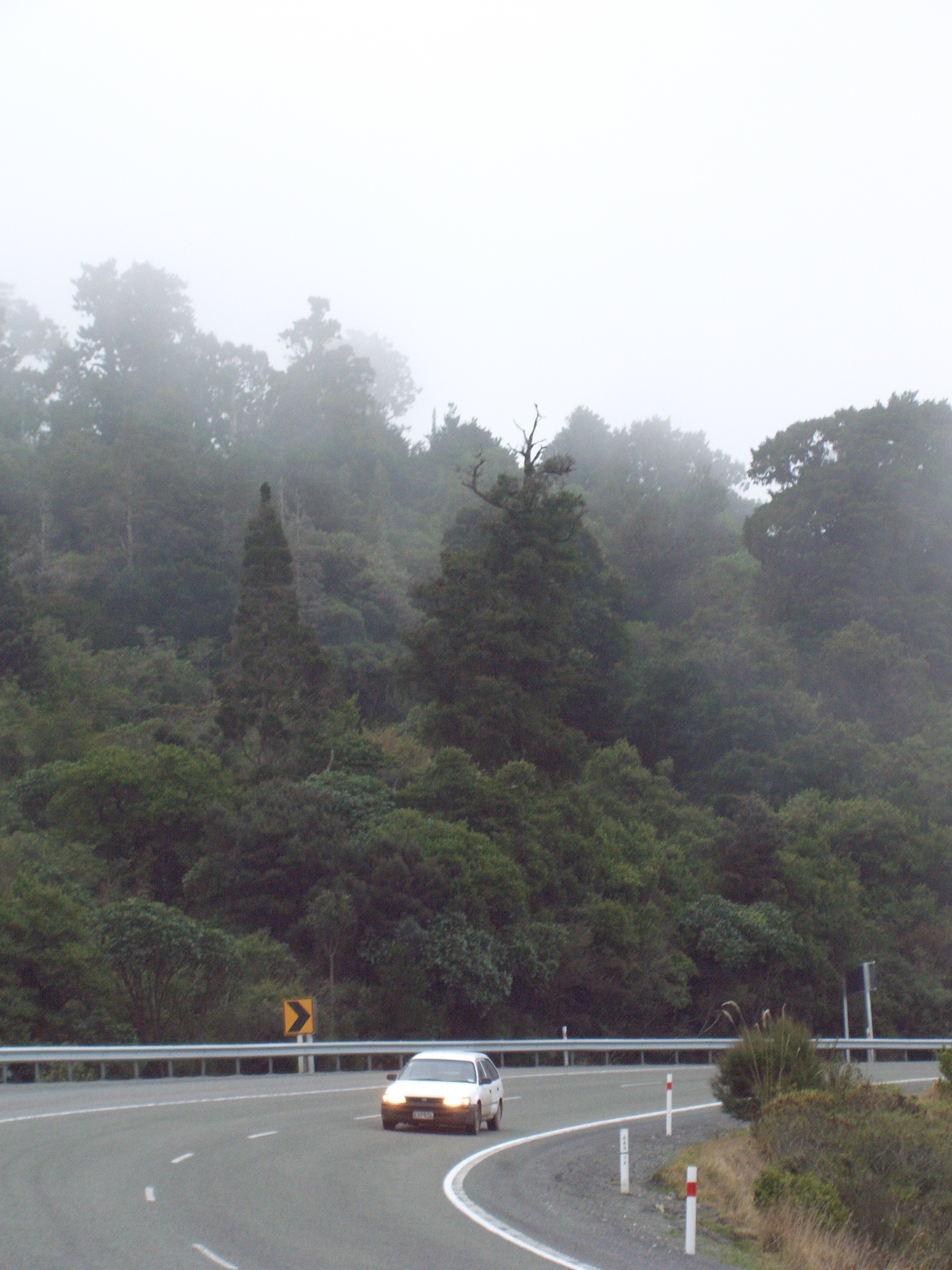
Leith Saddle under characteristic cloud cover

The forest here features a species of Libocedrus, variously called pāhautea, kaikawaka or New Zealand cedar, Libocedrus bidwillii, which is unusual in this region of New Zealand.

Transit New Zealand stated in 2004 that Leith Saddle has 250% more accidents than average for the New Zealand state highway network and that the accident rate increased by 50% in the ten years to 2004. They said realignment here would reduce traffic delays, fuel use, crashes, and emissions of carbon dioxide and carbon monoxide.

A contour pipeline running southbound over the saddle from several tributaries of the Waitati River feeds two of Dunedin's water supply reservoirs in Leith Valley: Ross Creek Reservoir and Sullivans Dam. Treated, fluoridated water is transmitted northwards from Dunedin's municipal water system via a new pipeline to the rural settlements of Waitati, Warrington and Seacliff.

== See also ==
- Mount Cargill
