= Dunedin-Waitati Highway =

Road in New Zealand

Dunedin-Waitati Highway
- State Highway 1

Route information
- Maintained by NZ Transport Agency Waka Kotahi
- Length: 15 km (9.3 mi)
- Existed: 14 December 1957–present

Major junctions
- North end: Waitati
- South end: Dunedin

Location
- Country: New Zealand

Highway system
- New Zealand state highways; Motorways and expressways; List

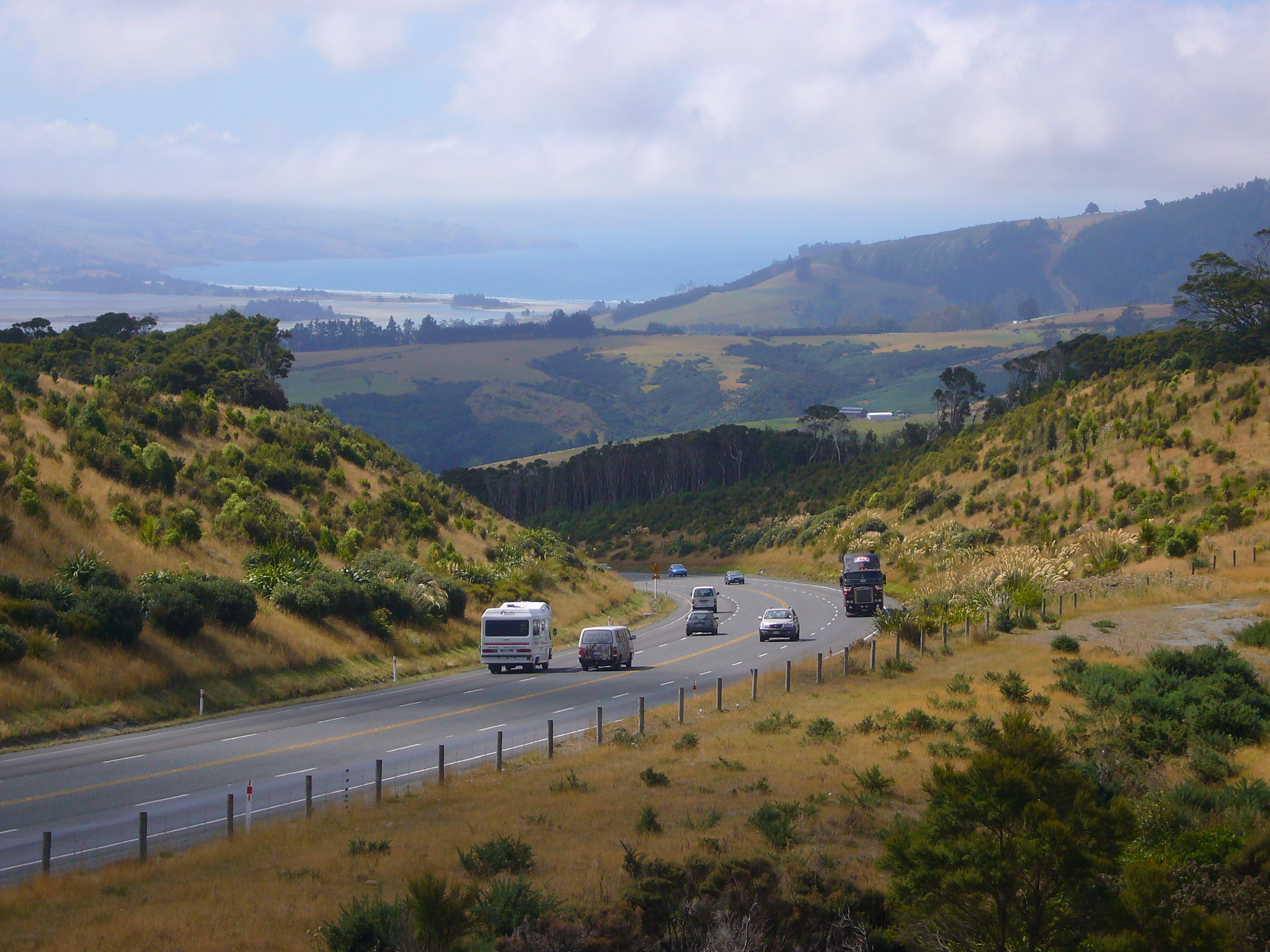
Dunedin–Waitati Hwy looking north from near the Pigeon Flat Overbridge. Blueskin Bay is visible in the background

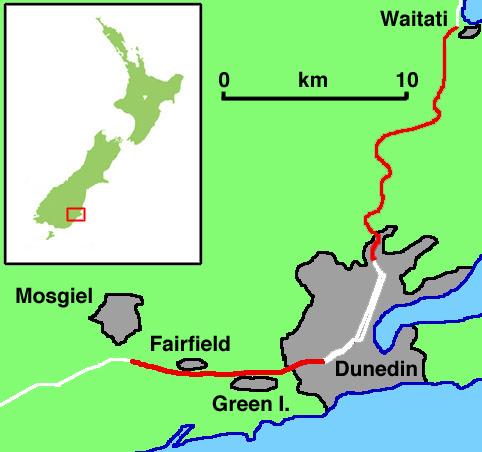
Map showing Dunedin–Waitati Highway and the Dunedin Southern Motorway (marked in red – other parts of State Highway 1 are marked in white)

Dunedin–Waitati Highway (SH 1), formerly (and currently in official land-use planning contexts) called Dunedin Northern Motorway, is a two-to-four-lane limited-access road which provides the main route north from the city of Dunedin, New Zealand. Opened on 14 December 1957, it superseded the narrow and winding routes via Port Chalmers and Mount Cargill. The road is occasionally briefly closed by snowfall in winter.

== Route ==
Point	Coordinates (links to map & photo sources)	Notes
Pine Hill terminus	45.8498°S 170.5095°E	
Maxwellton Street bridge	45.8383°S 170.5110°E	
Dryden Road bridge	45.8179°S 170.5171°E	
Leith Valley Road bridge	45.8117°S 170.5192°E	
Leith Saddle summit intersection	45.8001°S 170.5161°E	
Pigeon Flat Road bridge	45.7914°S 170.5409°E	
Waitati Valley Road intersection	45.7636°S 170.5582°E	
Waitati terminus	45.7467°S 170.5688°E	

Dunedin–Waitati Highway is relatively steep and winding, traversing part of the Silverpeaks range of hills. It begins a short distance north-west from where the two main parts of Dunedin's central business district one-way street system combine near The Gardens Corner with a pair of bridges over the Water of Leith. The highway connects with Bank St and George St then climbs Pine Hill Rd to the northern Dunedin suburb of Pine Hill. A direct highway link from Kaikorai Valley, bypassing the city, was planned in the 1970s to join the road alongside Pine Hill.

From Pine Hill the highway follows the northeastern side of the Leith Valley, then crosses the headwaters of the Leith before traversing the Leith Saddle. At 380m the saddle is the highest point of Dunedin-Waitati Highway, and therefore of State Highway 1 in the South Island. From here the highway takes a roller-coaster-like course to the valley of the Waitati River, then to Waitati. Together with The Kilmog, a hill 5 kilometres (3.1 mi) north of Waitati, this is one of the two most notable hill sections of State Highway 1 south of Christchurch.

== 'Motorway' status and access ==
Dunedin–Waitati Highway was officially designated a motorway when it opened on 14 December 1957 and is still colloquially referred to as such. "Motorway" signage was removed and the road lacks any indication of its former status other than "No Cycling/No Pedestrians" signs at Pine Hill and Waitati Valley. Apart from occasional overpasses, it does not resemble a motorway, rather a two-to-four-lane undivided limited-access road, although cyclists and pedestrians are allowed on the northern section.

Dunedin–Waitati Highway is a highway in terms of traffic regulations, while the land corridor is designated motorway under the New Zealand Government Roading Powers Act and town planning rules.

There are occasional private property accesses along the 15 km length and two at-grade intersections: one at the Leith Saddle summit, with Leith Valley Road and Waitati Valley Road, the other at the lower end of Waitati Valley Road. Intersecting roads all have low traffic volumes and are unsealed. All other road crossings are grade separated on bridges with no road connections, at Maxwellton Street (which links the suburb of Glenleith with both Pine Hill and the summit of Mount Cargill), Leith Valley Road, Dryden Road, and Pigeon Flat Road; the last of these is the only bridge north of the saddle.

== Improvements ==
Several parts of the highway were realigned or widened around 2000, most notably between the Pigeon Flat Overbridge and the start of the Waitati River floodplain.

=== Leith Saddle ===
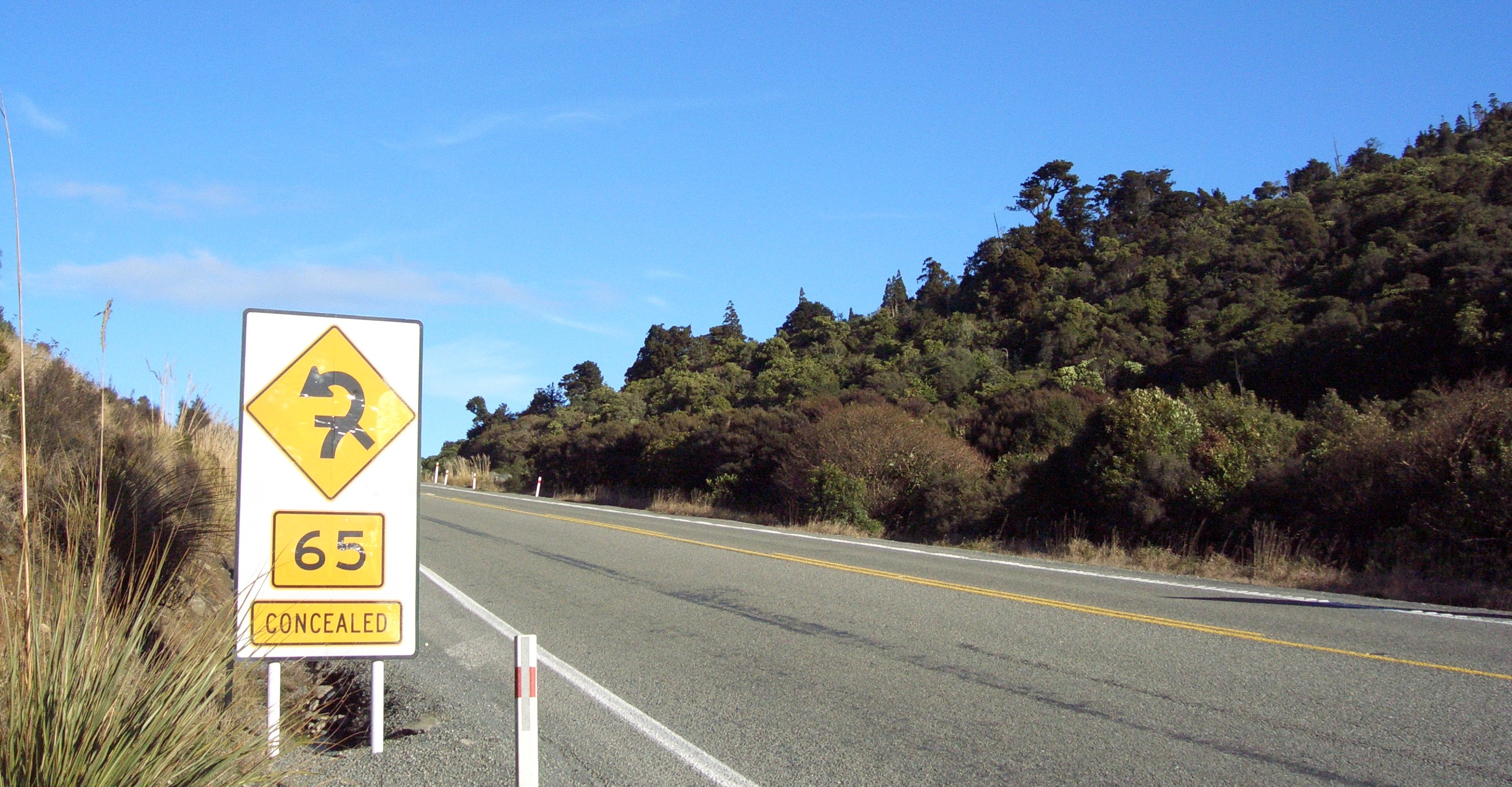
Leith Saddle is a strategic point where the motorway traverses a fragile alpine forest dominated by Libocedrus bidwillii (visible on the skyline at right). Proposed road works to straighten a dangerous corner here conflict with conservation values.

Transit New Zealand signalled in 2004 its long term intention was to re-align SH1 in the vicinity of Leith Saddle, which would require some removal of old-growth forest

The forest here features a species of Libocedrus, variously called Pahautea, Kaikawaka or New Zealand cedar, Libocedrus bidwillii, which is unusual in this region of New Zealand. Transit New Zealand stated in 2004 that Leith Saddle has 250% more crashes than average for the New Zealand state highway network and that the accident rate increased by 50% in the ten years to 2004. They said realignment here would reduce traffic delays, fuel use, crashes, and emissions of carbon dioxide and carbon monoxide.

=== Waitati ===
The motorway originally ended at Waitati with a roundabout, which featured in the New Zealand film Goodbye Pork Pie. The roundabout has been removed, leaving a sharp curve with a T junction. In 2010, the NZ Transport Agency (the successor highway authority to Transit New Zealand) was given consent to realign the road here.

=== North Dunedin proposal ===
The southern terminus of the highway at Pine Hill leads to the Pine Hill Extension, a narrow, winding, steep incline down into Dunedin North. In the 1970s an alternative route to the city was proposed, but later abandoned. It would have provided a long, straight ramp down to Leith Valley connecting to a highway across the Ross Creek Reserve and adjacent golf course, linking to Kaikorai Valley.

== See also ==
- List of motorways in New Zealand
