= Careys Creek =

River in New Zealand

- Route of Careys Creek
- Mouth of Careys Creek Careys Creek (South Island)

Location
- Country: New Zealand

Physical characteristics
- Source
  - location: The Silverpeaks
  - coordinates: 45°45′22″S 170°29′45″E
- Mouth
  - location: Blueskin Bay
  - coordinates: 45°43′21″S 170°34′17″E

Basin features
- Progression: Careys Creek → Blueskin Bay → Pacific Ocean
- Tributaries
  - left: Kilmog Creek

Careys Creek, known in Māori as Whaitiripaku and Waihema, is a small river in Otago, New Zealand, which flows from the Silverpeaks into Blueskin Bay at Evansdale. The creek drains the forest plantations and native bush of Silverpeaks Forest and the Careys Creek Conservation Area. It is crossed by State Highway 1 at Evansdale, close to the foot of The Kilmog.

== Land tenure and management ==
The Careys Creek catchment was within the former "Silverpeaks State Forest" created from poor-quality grazing land in the 1960s and 1970s. The native bush was separated from the pine plantation during the Rogernomics privatisation of the New Zealand Forest Service to become the Careys Creek Conservation Area managed by DOC. The pine plantations passed through other owners and are now run by the Dunedin City Council-owned City Forests Ltd and known as Silverpeaks Forest

During its tenure as a State Forest the valley floor was grazed, and accessible by farm vehicle for the first few kilometres. Now this area is reverting to native bush through a succession of rank pasture grasses, brooms, willows and mānuka.

== History ==
The Seacliff Lunatic Asylum, during Truby King's period of management, built a water supply pipeline from a dam at the head of the valley, near Semple Road. Rusting bits of pipe are still visible in places.

== Recreation ==
The entrance to the Careys Creek valley system is at a small public picnic area, Evansdale Glen, off State Highway 1 about 200 metres (660 ft) north of the township of Evansdale. Careys Creek Track follows the old farm track to its end at the foot of Rongomai Ridge and becomes progressively rougher as a narrow foot track to the creek's source, ending at a car park on Semple Road. This section probably dates back to the Asylum pipeline construction. Rongomai Ridge Track has a steep climb, continuing as a forestry road to Mountain Road. Honeycomb Ridge Track branches off further up the valley and heads up steep climbs to emerge at a parking area on Mountain Road. At this point, by heading north along Mountain Road, a sign marking the start Rongomai Track can be found.

== See also ==
- List of rivers of New Zealand
