= Lionel Terry =

New Zealand white supremacist and murderer

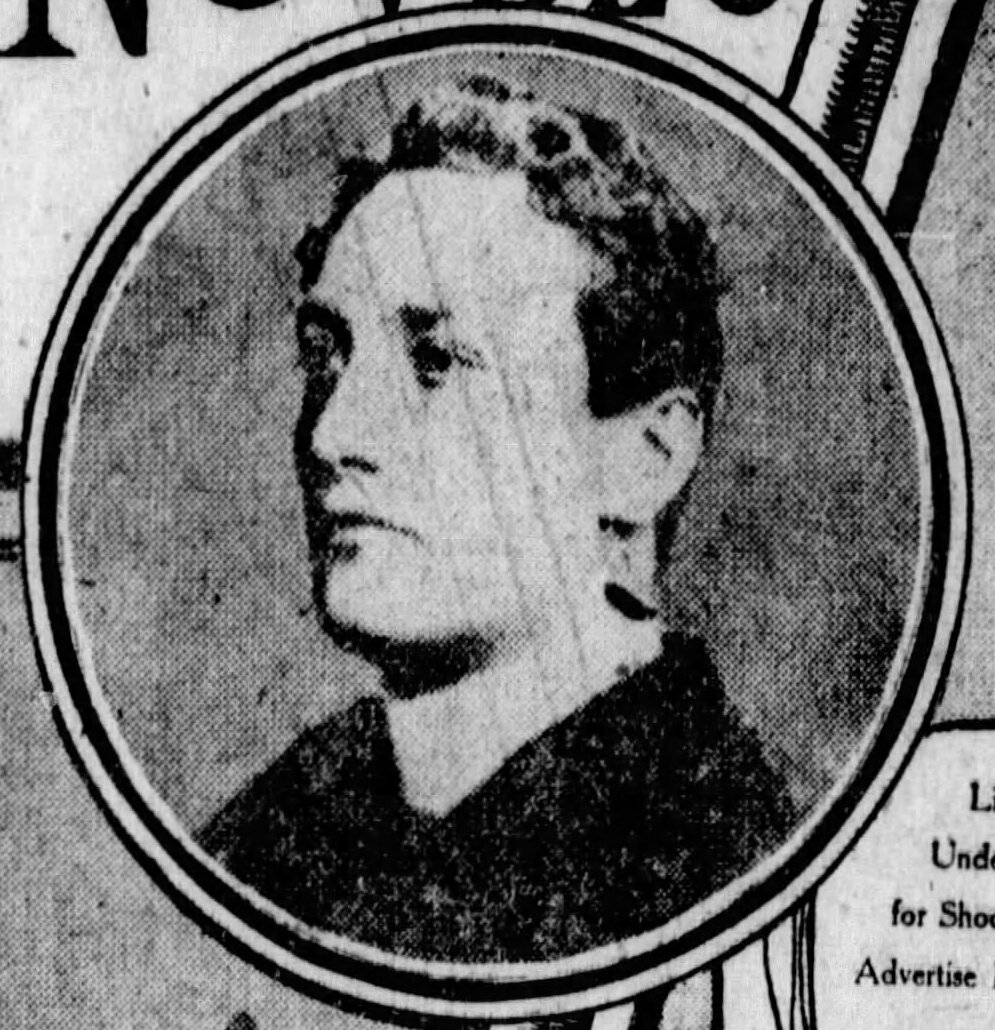
- Born: 6 January 1873; Sandwich, Kent, England
- Died: 20 August 1952 (aged 79); Seacliff Lunatic Asylum, Seacliff, New Zealand
- Status: Deceased
- Motive: White supremacy
- Conviction: Murder
- Penalty: Death; commuted to life imprisonment

Details
- Victims: Joe Kum Yung, 70
- Date: 24 September 1905
- Country: New Zealand

Edward Lionel Terry (6 January 1873 – 20 August 1952) was an English white supremacist and murderer, incarcerated in psychiatric institutions after murdering a Chinese immigrant, Joe Kum Yung, in Wellington, New Zealand in 1905.

== Life before New Zealand ==
Edward Lionel Terry was born in Sandwich, Kent in 1873. He was the son of Edward Terry and Frances Terry (nee Thompson). His father was a prosperous corn merchant in Kent, and later managed Pall Mall Real Estate. He was educated at Merton College in Wimbledon.

Terry worked initially for the West Indies Gold Mining Corporation in London and joined the Royal Regiment Artillery in 1892. After his father secured his discharge in 1895, he became involved in successive itinerant occupations in South Africa, the United States, Canada and Australia.

Terry travelled to the West Indies and climbed Mount Pelee in Martinique before it erupted, and spent weeks exploring the interior of Dominica, producing the first map of it. He served in a mounted police brigade in Bulawayo, Rhodesia, fighting against the Matabele in the Second Matabele War, taking part in fifteen engagements and being wounded twice. He took part in the ill-fated Jameson Raid, on 29 December 1895.

In Canada, Terry served as the secretary of a miner's union, and was outraged at how the Premier of British Columbia, James Dunsmuir, who was also a mine owner, hired Chinese labour for low wages in preference to Caucasians. Likewise, Terry was angered by the mine owners in South Africa importing Chinese coolies to work for low wages ahead of Caucasians. He was strongly in favour of the white working class of the British Empire and believed the British government, capitalists and Jewish financiers were destroying the Empire's future by using the working class like slaves, and also hiring non-white labour.

Terry departed Canada for Australia via Hawaii, and after some time there moved to New Zealand.

== New Zealand: 1903-1905 ==
In New Zealand, Terry first worked for the Department of Lands and Survey in Auckland, before trying to establish a horticultural market garden north of there. In 1903, he worked as a Taihape bush feller, north of Palmerston North and Feilding, before recommencing employment with the Department of Lands and Survey as a surveyor, based in Mangonui, Northland in 1905.

== The murder of Joe Kum Yung in 1905 ==
Terry wrote letters and poems to various publications espousing his views on labour, capitalism, the empire and race. He wrote and privately published The Shadow while in New Zealand. A copy of the original is in the State Library of Victoria in Australia. This text called on King Edward VII to defend his empire against the capitalists and against Chinese and East Asian immigration.

From June 1905 he undertook a 900 km trek from Mangonui to Wellington, distributing copies of The Shadow as he went. Once he reached the nation's capital in September of that year he attempted to convince New Zealand's parliament to ban any further Chinese and East Asian immigration to New Zealand, but failed to do so.

On 24 September 1905, Terry shot Joe (possibly Zhou) Kum Yung, a Chinese immigrant, in Haining Street, Wellington. Yung died later of injuries. According to John Dunmore, Yung was an elderly Canton Chinese gold prospector, aged 70, who had a pronounced limp as a result of a past mining accident. Terry selected Yung as his victim due to this infirmity. Yung appears to have been destitute, given his lack of luck on the declining goldfields, and yearned to return to his native Canton.

Although police had no leads on the murder, Terry submitted himself to the authorities the following day saying: "I have come to tell you that I am the man who shot the Chinaman in the Chinese quarters of the city last evening. I take an interest in alien immigration and I took this means of bringing it under the public notice."

The New Zealand Supreme Court convicted him of murder on 21 November 1905. Originally, he was sentenced to death, but the sentence was commuted to life incarceration within New Zealand psychiatric institutions. Over the next 47 years Terry was imprisoned in Christchurch's Sunnyside, Dunedin's Seacliff Lunatic Asylum and Lyttelton Prison. He was later diagnosed with paranoid schizophrenia. This did not prevent some New Zealanders from circulating a petition for mitigation of his sentence, albeit the local Chinese community circulated a counter-petition in response. A 1911 petition on Terry's behalf claimed that he'd committed the crime, which "arose from an excess of patriotic zeal," out of impulse, which was "the result of over-anxious thought on the subject of race pollution."

== Psychiatric incarceration: 1905-1952 ==
Terry absconded from Sunnyside twice, in 1909 and 1914. Under Seacliff administrator Truby King, he seemed to recover slightly from his mental illness, and was allowed to produce more poetry, paint and undertake horticulture. Over time, he developed messianic religious delusions and later assaulted a doctor who attempted to administer an anti-typhoid injection in 1940, whereupon he was returned to solitary confinement. Terry died in 1952 from a stroke, aged 79.

== Posthumous interest ==
There has been some posthumous interest in Terry's life and times, which has led to some poetry about his offending, and a biography in the late 1970s. Terry has received a capsule biography in the online Dictionary of New Zealand Biography, and a further section in the recently published Wild Cards: Eccentric Characters From New Zealand's Past (2006). Not all of this interest has been scholarly in tone, as the neofascist New Zealand Nationalist Workers Party republished copies of The Shadow for their anti-immigrant racist purposes in the eighties.

Terry and his trial in the Supreme Court feature in the early part of Alison Wong's novel, As the Earth Turns Silver, published by Penguin in 2009.

The story of Terry's victim, Joe Kum Yung, is told in How to Be Dead in a Year of Snakes, a book of poems by Wellington poet Chris Tse.

== Biography ==
- Lionel Terry: The Shadow: Auckland: Wilson & Horton Printers: 1905.
- Lionel Terry: The Shadow: Lionel Terry and The Yellow Peril: Lower Hutt: Nationalist Workers Party: 1984.
- Lionel Terry: The Shadow: Lionel Terry and the Yellow Peril: Wellington: Realist Press: nd, 1984-1989?

Works About Terry:

- John Dunmore. "The Defender of Racial Purity: Lionel Terry" (p. 129-135) in Wild Cards: Eccentric Characters from New Zealand's Past. Auckland: New Holland. 2006. ISBN 1-86966-132-X
- Robert Solway. Murder at Thirteen Haining Street. Wellington: Stewart Lawrence. 1948.
- Frank Tod. The Making of A Madman. Dunedin: Otago Foundation. 1977.
- C.A.Treadwell. Notable New Zealand Trials. New Plymouth. 1936.
