= Ascuta leith =

Conservation status
- Naturally Uncommon (NZ TCS)

Scientific classification
- Kingdom: Animalia
- Phylum: Arthropoda
- Subphylum: Chelicerata
- Class: Arachnida
- Order: Araneae
- Infraorder: Araneomorphae
- Family: Orsolobidae
- Genus: Ascuta
- Species: A. leith

Binomial name
- Ascuta leith Forster & Platnick, 1985

Species of spider

Ascuta leith is a species of Orsolobidae spider of the genus Ascuta. The species is endemic to New Zealand.

== Taxonomy ==
This species was described in 1985 by Ray Forster and Norman Platnick from a single female specimen collected in Otago. The species name refers to the site it was collected from. The holotype is stored in Otago Museum.

== Description ==
The female is recorded at 2.92 mm (0.115 in) in length. The carapace and abdomen are patterned dorsally.

== Distribution ==
This species is only known from Leith Saddle in Otago, New Zealand.

== Conservation status ==
Under the New Zealand Threat Classification System, this species is listed as "Naturally Uncommon" with the qualifiers of "Data Poor: Size" and "Data Poor: Trend".
