= Northern Motorway =

Northern Motorway may refer to one of several motorways in New Zealand:

- Auckland Northern Motorway
- Christchurch Northern Motorway
- Dunedin Northern Motorway
