= Ascuta ornata =

Conservation status
- Not Threatened (NZ TCS)

Scientific classification
- Kingdom: Animalia
- Phylum: Arthropoda
- Subphylum: Chelicerata
- Class: Arachnida
- Order: Araneae
- Infraorder: Araneomorphae
- Family: Orsolobidae
- Genus: Ascuta
- Species: A. ornata

Binomial name
- Ascuta ornata Forster, 1956

Species of spider

Ascuta ornata is a species of orsolobidae spider of the genus Ascuta. The species is endemic to New Zealand.

== Taxonomy ==
This species was described in 1956 by Ray Forster from male and female specimens collected in Te Anau. The holotype is stored in Canterbury Museum.

== Description ==
The male is recorded at 2.2 mm (0.087 in) in length whilst the female is 2.4 mm (0.094 in). The carapace is yellow brown with dorsal markings. The legs are yellowish brown. The abdomen is creamy white with a chevron pattern dorsally.

== Distribution ==
This species is known from Te Anau and Arthurs Pass in New Zealand.

== Conservation status ==
Under the New Zealand Threat Classification System, this species is listed as "Not Threatened".
