= Ascuta monowai =

Conservation status
- Data Deficit (NZ TCS)

Scientific classification
- Kingdom: Animalia
- Phylum: Arthropoda
- Subphylum: Chelicerata
- Class: Arachnida
- Order: Araneae
- Infraorder: Araneomorphae
- Family: Orsolobidae
- Genus: Ascuta
- Species: A. monowai

Binomial name
- Ascuta monowai Forster & Platnick, 1985

Species of spider

Ascuta monowai is a species of Orsolobidae. The species is endemic to New Zealand.

== Taxonomy ==
This species was described in 1985 by Ray Forster and Norman Platnick from a single female specimen collected at Lake Monowai. The species name refers to the locality of the holotype. The holotype is stored at Otago Museum.

== Description ==
The female is recorded at 3.04 mm (0.120 in) in length. The carapace and abdomen are patterned.

== Distribution ==
This species is only known from near Lake Monowai in Southland, New Zealand.

== Conservation status ==
Under the New Zealand Threat Classification System, this species is listed as "Data Deficient" with the qualifiers of "Data Poor: Size", "Data Poor: Trend" and "One Location."
