= Evansdale, New Zealand =

Evansdale
- Locality
- Location in New Zealand
- Coordinates: 45.7189°S 170.569031°E
- Country: New Zealand
- Region: Otago
- Territorial authority: Dunedin City Council
- Local iwi: Ngāi Tahu

Evansdale is a locality on State Highway 1, 25 km north of Dunedin, at the north west of Blueskin Bay. It also has lent its name to a cheese producer, and a census-gathering district, which has a population of 1,482 in the 2013 New Zealand census, an increase of 198 people since the 2006 census.

== History ==
Evansdale began as a collection of houses and a hotel (the Blueskin Hotel), around the bridge over Careys Creek. This bridge formed a strategic point on what was called the Main North Road, and a toll gate was built here. William Evans, a Welshman, and another settler David Carey competed for the right to name the locality as Evansdale or "Carey Junction"; eventually Carey's name was applied to the creek.

When the Main South Line railway was built from Dunedin a terminal station here, Whaitiripaku, provided a transit point to horse-drawn transport northward.

Evansdale's period as a railhead encouraged rapid development and in a short time there was a post and telegraph office and a school. Later the railway was linked around the coast to Christchurch and the station, now a through station known as Evansdale became less important. The community began a long, slow economic decline: the school (closed in 1928) and the post office both relocated to Warrington. The hotel remained and eventually became an important fuel stop, the Glenhouse Service Station, as road transport developed.

In the early 1970s, the Main North Road, now known as State Highway 1 was widened and straightened through the village with devastating effect, taking out about half a dozen houses. A large depot for the New Zealand Ministry of Works was built for the major road improvements over the nearby Kilmog.

The village declined economically from the 1980s to the 2000s as Rogernomics and changes in the fuel industry led to the closure of the Works depot, railway halt and service station. The depot became an owner-operated sawmill and landscaping business while the service station is gradually being developed for retailing and hospitality. A new development over this period was the Evansdale Cheese factory producing handcrafted "farmhouse" cheeses. The cheese factory's success has ironically contributed to Evansdale's decline: it relocated to Hawksbury, 15 km to the north.

== Confusion over the place name ==
- In 2005 publication of the results of a Dunedin City Council survey on water reticulation led to protests and accusations of gerrymandering as a vast number of survey respondents were listed as living in "Evansdale". This relates to the use of the name for a large census-gathering district by Statistics New Zealand, the City Council was simply using the name and boundaries used in other census gathering.
- When Evansdale Cheese relocated to Hawksbury its prominent signage there led to that location becoming mistakenly known as "Evansdale".

== Evansdale now ==
In the 2000s, Evansdale has experienced a housing micro-boom, with a growth in housing stock of about 10% over a couple of years. The area has easy commuter access to Dunedin and several vacant residential building sites with electricity and water connections.
