= Evansdale statistical district =

Coordinates: 45.7189°S 170.569031°E

Evansdale is a census-gathering district in rural Dunedin, New Zealand. It encompasses all areas outside of urban areas between Mount Cargill and the northern Dunedin City boundary. It is named after one of the small villages it contains: Evansdale, New Zealand.

According to the 2013 New Zealand census, Evansdale has a population of 1,482, an increase of 198 people since the 2006 census.

== Localities and rural districts in Evansdale statistical district ==
(Selection only, running South to North)

- Waitati Valley
- Double Hill
- Evansdale
- Omimi
- Kilmog
- Merton
- Seacliff
- Hawksbury
- Bucklands Crossing
- Tumai

== Confusion over the name ==
A casual reading of any list of population data from this part of New Zealand which includes "Evansdale" will appear to indicate that the tiny road-corner cluster of houses at Evansdale is a large town.

In 2005 publication of the results of a Dunedin City Council survey on water reticulation led to protests and accusations of gerrymandering as a vast number of survey respondents were listed as living in "Evansdale". The City Council was simply using the name and boundaries provided by Statistics New Zealand, used in other census gathering.
