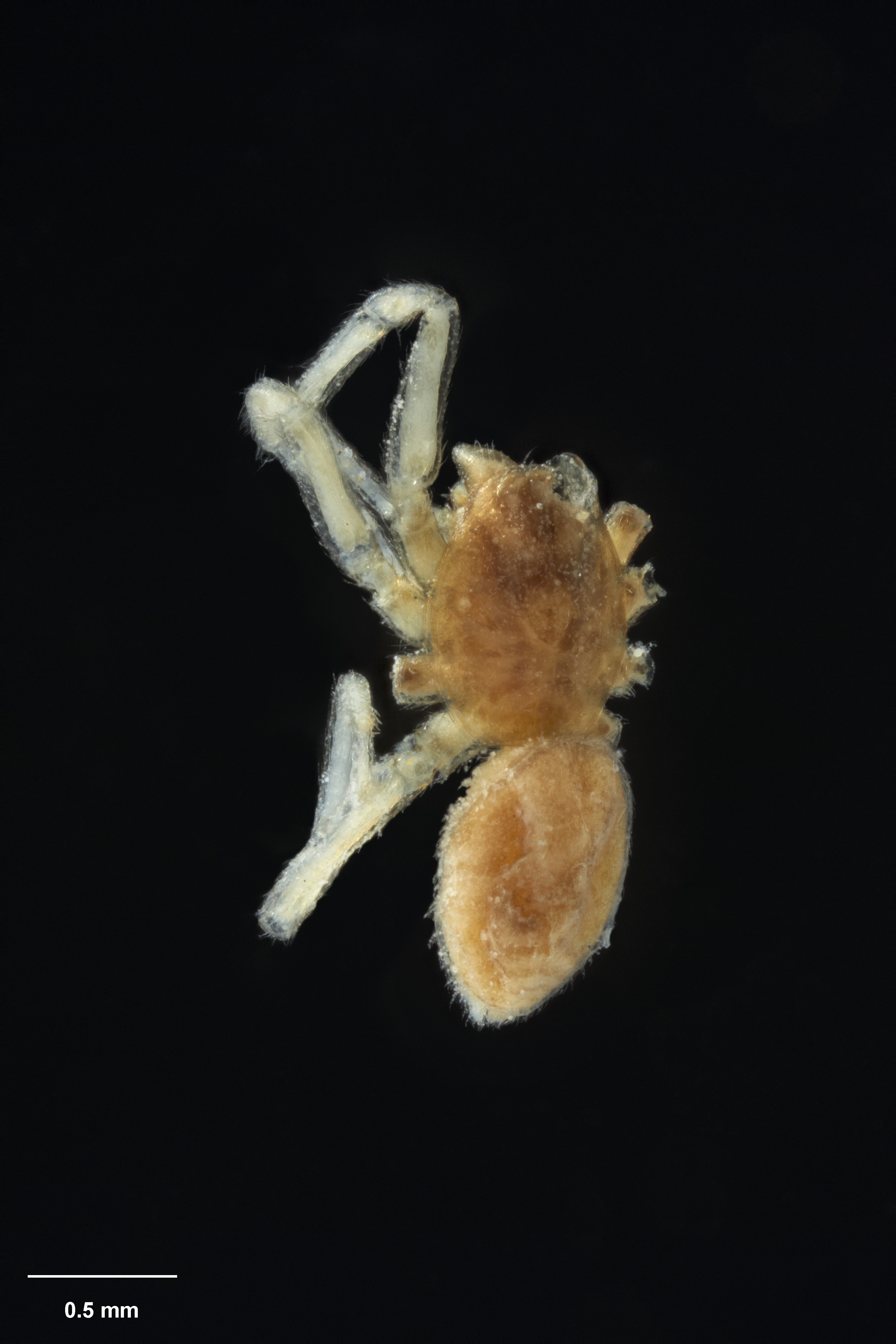
- Ascuta australis

Scientific classification
- Kingdom: Animalia
- Phylum: Arthropoda
- Subphylum: Chelicerata
- Class: Arachnida
- Order: Araneae
- Infraorder: Araneomorphae
- Family: Orsolobidae
- Genus: Ascuta; Forster, 1956

Type species
- A. media Forster, 1956

Species
- 14, see text

= Ascuta =

Genus of spiders

Ascuta is a genus of araneomorph spiders endemic to New Zealand in the family Orsolobidae, and was first described by Raymond Robert Forster in 1956.

== Species ==
As of June 2019 it contains fourteen species, found only in New Zealand:

- Ascuta australis Forster, 1956 – New Zealand
- Ascuta cantuaria Forster & Platnick, 1985 – New Zealand
- Ascuta inopinata Forster, 1956 – New Zealand
- Ascuta insula Forster & Platnick, 1985 – New Zealand
- Ascuta leith Forster & Platnick, 1985 – New Zealand
- Ascuta media Forster, 1956 (type) – New Zealand
- Ascuta monowai Forster & Platnick, 1985 – New Zealand
- Ascuta montana Forster & Platnick, 1985 – New Zealand
- Ascuta musca Forster & Platnick, 1985 – New Zealand
- Ascuta ornata Forster, 1956 – New Zealand
- Ascuta parornata Forster & Platnick, 1985 – New Zealand
- Ascuta taupo Forster & Platnick, 1985 – New Zealand
- Ascuta tongariro Forster & Platnick, 1985 – New Zealand
- Ascuta univa Forster & Platnick, 1985 – New Zealand
