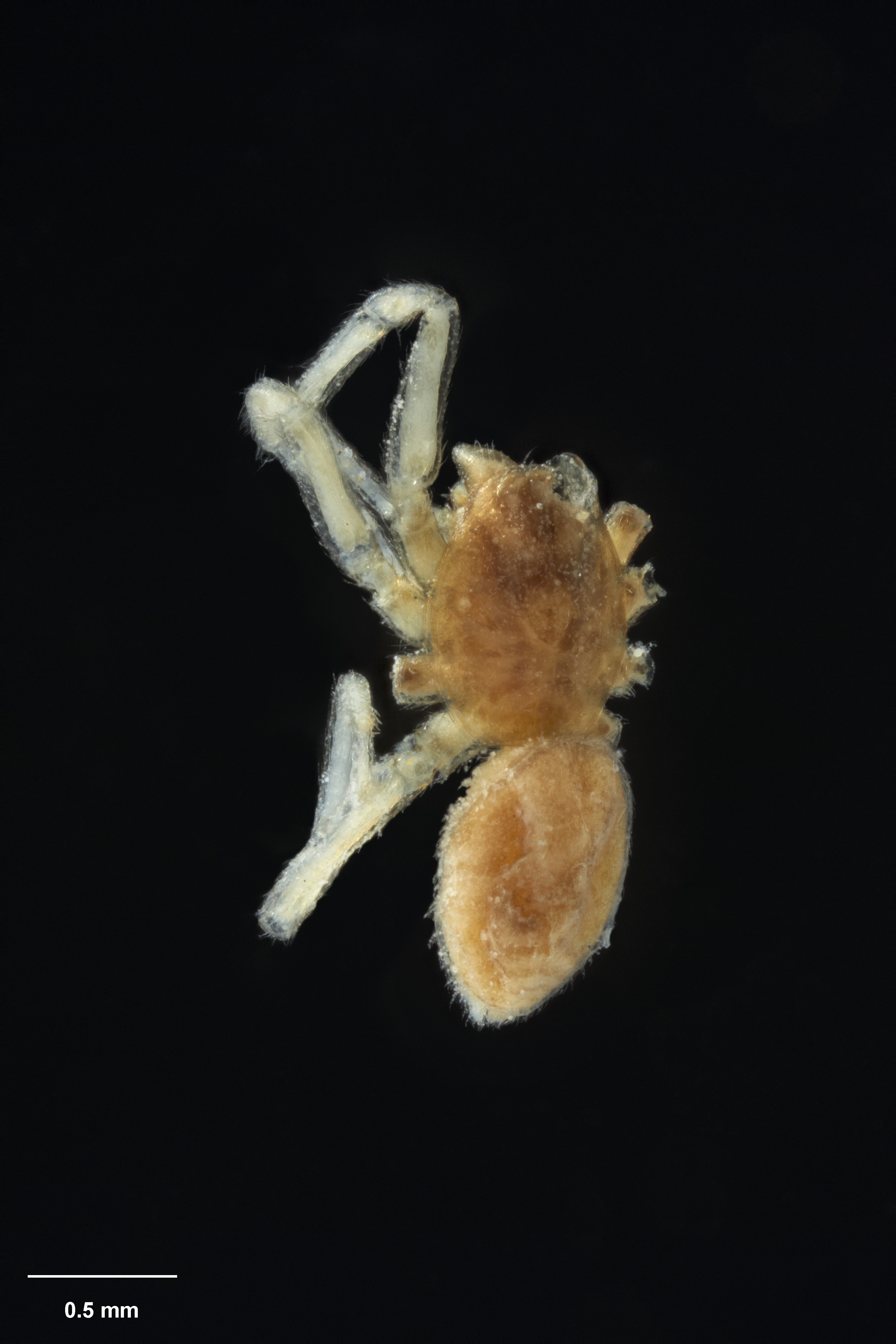

Conservation status
- Naturally Uncommon (NZ TCS)

Scientific classification
- Kingdom: Animalia
- Phylum: Arthropoda
- Subphylum: Chelicerata
- Class: Arachnida
- Order: Araneae
- Infraorder: Araneomorphae
- Family: Orsolobidae
- Genus: Ascuta
- Species: A. australis

Binomial name
- Ascuta australis Forster, 1956

= Ascuta australis =

Species of spider

Ascuta australis is a species of orsolobidae spider of the genus Ascuta. The species is endemic to New Zealand

== Taxonomy ==
This species was first described from two specimens by Ray Forster in 1956. The holotype specimen was collected by Richard Dell and Beverley Holloway at Murderer's Cove, Big South Cape Island, near Stewart Island, during the 1955 Dominion Museum expedition.

The holotype is stored at Te Papa Museum under registration number AS.002421.

== Description ==
The male is roughly 1.8 mm (0.071 in) in length. The carapace is yellow brown whilst the abdomen is creamy white. The female is identical but is somewhat smaller.

== Distribution ==
This species is only known from Big South Cape Island near Stewart Island in New Zealand.

== Conservation status ==
Under the New Zealand Threat Classification System, this species is listed as Naturally Uncommon with the qualifiers of "Island Endemic" and "One Location".
