= Ascuta cantuaria =

Conservation status
- Data Deficit (NZ TCS)

Scientific classification
- Kingdom: Animalia
- Phylum: Arthropoda
- Subphylum: Chelicerata
- Class: Arachnida
- Order: Araneae
- Infraorder: Araneomorphae
- Family: Orsolobidae
- Genus: Ascuta
- Species: A. cantuaria

Binomial name
- Ascuta cantuaria Forster & Platnick, 1985

Species of spider

Ascuta cantuaria is a species of Orsolobidae spider of the genus Ascuta. The species is endemic to New Zealand.

== Taxonomy ==
This species was described in 1985 by Ray Forster and Norman Platnick from a single female specimen collected in Christchurch. The species name is a reference to the type locality. The holotype is stored in the New Zealand Arthropod Collection under registration number NZAC03014991.

== Description ==
The female is recorded at 3.36 mm (0.132 in) in length.

== Distribution ==
This species is only known from Kennedy's Bush in Christchurch, New Zealand.

== Conservation status ==
Under the New Zealand Threat Classification System, this species is listed as "Data Deficient" with the qualifiers of "Data Poor: Size", "Data Poor: Trend" and "One Location".
