= Evansdale Cheese =

New Zealand cheese company

Evansdale Cheese Factory is a small New Zealand producer of handmade cheeses, located at Hawksbury in Otago, about 35 km north of Dunedin on State Highway 1. It takes its name from its original location at Evansdale, which lies 15 km north of Dunedin at the foot of the Kilmog.

The company states that it has won awards including 'The Supreme Champion Award for Cheese in New Zealand' and 'The Auckland Royal Easter Show Supreme Award' and that it has supplied cheese to Government House, Wellington for Queen Elizabeth II.
