= Ascuta montana =

Conservation status
- Data Deficit (NZ TCS)

Scientific classification
- Kingdom: Animalia
- Phylum: Arthropoda
- Subphylum: Chelicerata
- Class: Arachnida
- Order: Araneae
- Infraorder: Araneomorphae
- Family: Orsolobidae
- Genus: Ascuta
- Species: A. montana

Binomial name
- Ascuta montana Forster & Platnick, 1985

Species of spider

Ascuta montana is a species of Orsolobidae. The species is endemic to New Zealand.

== Taxonomy ==
This species was described in 1985 by Ray Forster and Norman Platnick from a single male specimen collected on Mount Robert. The holotype is stored in Otago Museum.

== Description ==
The male is recorded at 2.48 mm (0.098 in) in length. The carapace has patterning around the eyes. The abdomen has extensive patterns dorsally.

== Distribution and habitat ==
This species is only known from Mount Robert, New Zealand. It is known to occur in Nothofagus menziesii.

== Conservation status ==
Under the New Zealand Threat Classification System, this species is listed as "Data Deficient" with the qualifiers of "Data Poor: Size", "Data Poor: Trend" and "One Location".
