= Ascuta musca =

Conservation status
- Not Threatened (NZ TCS)

Scientific classification
- Kingdom: Animalia
- Phylum: Arthropoda
- Subphylum: Chelicerata
- Class: Arachnida
- Order: Araneae
- Infraorder: Araneomorphae
- Family: Orsolobidae
- Genus: Ascuta
- Species: A. musca

Binomial name
- Ascuta musca Forster & Platnick, 1985

Species of spider

Ascuta musca is a species of spider in the family Orsolobidae. The species is endemic to New Zealand.

== Taxonomy ==
This species was described in 1985 by Ray Forster and Norman Platnick from male and female specimens collected in Arthurs Pass. The holotype is stored in Otago Museum.

== Description ==
The male is recorded at 2.05 mm (0.081 in) in length. In contrast to this the female is 2.41mm in length. The carapace and abdomen are patterned.

== Distribution ==
This species is only known from Arthurs Pass, New Zealand.

== Conservation status ==
Under the New Zealand Threat Classification System, this species is listed as "Not Threatened".
