= Ascuta parornata =

Conservation status
- Data Deficient (NZ TCS)

Scientific classification
- Domain: Eukaryota
- Kingdom: Animalia
- Phylum: Arthropoda
- Subphylum: Chelicerata
- Class: Arachnida
- Order: Araneae
- Infraorder: Araneomorphae
- Family: Orsolobidae
- Genus: Ascuta
- Species: A. parornata

Binomial name
- Ascuta parornata Forster & Platnick, 1985

Species of spider

Ascuta parornata is a species of orsolobidae spider. The species is endemic to New Zealand.

== Taxonomy ==
This species was described in 1985 by Ray Forster and Norman Platnick from male and female specimens collected in Fiordland. The holotype is stored in Otago Museum.

== Description ==
The female is recorded at 3.28 mm (0.129 in) in length whilst the male is 2.88 mm (0.113 in). The carapace and abdomen have patterning dorsally.

== Distribution ==
This species is only known from Fiordland, New Zealand.

== Conservation status ==
Under the New Zealand Threat Classification System, this species is listed as "Data Deficient" with the qualifiers of "Data Poor: Size" and "Data Poor: Trend".
