= Swampy Summit =

Hill in Dunedin, Otago Region, New Zealand

Highest point
- Elevation: 739 m (2,425 ft)
- Prominence: 290 m (950 ft)
- Parent peak: Silver Peak
- Isolation: 5.7 km (3.5 mi) to Pulpit Rock
- Coordinates: 45.7945°S 170.4772°E

Naming
- Native name: Whawha-raupō (Māori)

Geography
- Country: New Zealand
- Region: Otago
- District: Dunedin

Climbing
- Easiest route: Rollinson Road
- Normal route: Leith Saddle Track

Swampy Summit is a prominent hill 12 kilometres (7.5 mi) to the north of Dunedin, New Zealand. It reaches a height of 739 metres (2,425 ft).

The hill's eastern slopes forms the western side of Leith Valley, the other side of which consists of the flank of Mount Cargill. The Leith Saddle is 2500 metres to the east of Swampy Summit's peak. Both the Water of Leith and the Waitati River (which forms the valley on the north side of the Leith Saddle) have their sources on Swampy Summit's eastern flank.

As the name suggests, a regionally significant 48.4 hectares (120 acres) of wetland lies to the southeast, close to the peak of Swampy Summit. The wetland is largely composed of peat bog which formed in a hollow near the summit, over which sphagnum moss has grown. Beyond the wetland lies a subordinate peak, Swampy Spur.

To the west of Swampy Summit, the land falls away to form the valley of Whare Creek (McKenzie's Creek), a tributary of the Silver Stream. A ridge connects the hill with another prominent peak, Flagstaff, which lies five kilometres to the south.

The slopes of Swampy Summit are the site of several walking and mountain biking tracks, one of which — the Swampy Ridge Track — ascends to the hill's peak. The first track on Swampy Summit was formed in the 1840s by early settler Johnny Jones to ease his travels between his farm near Waikouaiti and the new settlement of Dunedin. A private access road also climbs to the summit, built during the 1960s when a telecommunications equipment was placed on and close to the summit.

== Climate ==
Climate data for Swampy Summit, elevation 716 m (2,349 ft), (1991–2020)
Month	Jan	Feb	Mar	Apr	May	Jun	Jul	Aug	Sep	Oct	Nov	Dec	Year
Mean daily maximum °C (°F)	15.7 (60.3)	15.5 (59.9)	14.2 (57.6)	11.6 (52.9)	9.0 (48.2)	6.3 (43.3)	5.7 (42.3)	6.9 (44.4)	9.2 (48.6)	11.2 (52.2)	12.7 (54.9)	14.5 (58.1)	11.0 (51.9)
Daily mean °C (°F)	11.3 (52.3)	11.3 (52.3)	10.1 (50.2)	8.0 (46.4)	6.0 (42.8)	3.7 (38.7)	3.0 (37.4)	3.9 (39.0)	5.5 (41.9)	6.9 (44.4)	8.3 (46.9)	10.2 (50.4)	7.4 (45.2)
Mean daily minimum °C (°F)	6.9 (44.4)	7.0 (44.6)	6.1 (43.0)	4.5 (40.1)	3.0 (37.4)	1.0 (33.8)	0.4 (32.7)	0.9 (33.6)	1.9 (35.4)	2.6 (36.7)	3.9 (39.0)	5.9 (42.6)	3.7 (38.6)
Source: NIWA
