= Ascuta inopinata =

Conservation status
- Data Deficit (NZ TCS)

Scientific classification
- Kingdom: Animalia
- Phylum: Arthropoda
- Subphylum: Chelicerata
- Class: Arachnida
- Order: Araneae
- Infraorder: Araneomorphae
- Family: Orsolobidae
- Genus: Ascuta
- Species: A. inopinata

Binomial name
- Ascuta inopinata Forster, 1956

Species of spider

Ascuta inopinata is a species of Orsolobidae spider of the genus Ascuta. The species is endemic to New Zealand.

== Taxonomy ==
This species was described in 1956 by Ray Forster from a single male specimen collected on Mount Arthur. It was redescribed in 1985. The holotype is stored in Te Papa Museum under registration number AS.000052.

== Description ==
The male is recorded at 2.29 mm (0.090 in) in length. The carapace is red brown. The legs are yellow brown. The abdomen is creamy with a chevron pattern.

== Distribution ==
This species is only known from Mount Arthur and Mount Fell, New Zealand.

== Conservation status ==
Under the New Zealand Threat Classification System, this species is listed as "Data Deficient" with the qualifiers of "Data Poor: Size" and "Data Poor: Trend".
