= Ascuta media =

Conservation status
- Not Threatened (NZ TCS)

Scientific classification
- Kingdom: Animalia
- Phylum: Arthropoda
- Subphylum: Chelicerata
- Class: Arachnida
- Order: Araneae
- Infraorder: Araneomorphae
- Family: Orsolobidae
- Genus: Ascuta
- Species: A. media

Binomial name
- Ascuta media Forster, 1956

Species of spider

Ascuta media is a species of spider in the family Orsolobidae. It is endemic to New Zealand.

== Taxonomy ==
Ascuta media was described in 1956 by Raymond Forster. The holotype is stored in Canterbury Museum.

== Description ==
Cephalothorax and chelicerae are a uniform brown colour. Legs are paler in colour. Eyes are ringed with black colour. Abdomen is creamy white with chevron patterns.

== Distribution ==
Ascuta media is endemic to Fiordland in New Zealand.

== Conservation status ==
Under the New Zealand Threat Classification System, this species is listed as "Not Threatened".
