= Ascuta taupo =

Conservation status
- Data Deficient (NZ TCS)

Scientific classification
- Domain: Eukaryota
- Kingdom: Animalia
- Phylum: Arthropoda
- Subphylum: Chelicerata
- Class: Arachnida
- Order: Araneae
- Infraorder: Araneomorphae
- Family: Orsolobidae
- Genus: Ascuta
- Species: A. taupo

Binomial name
- Ascuta taupo Forster & Platnick, 1985

Species of spider

Ascuta taupo is a species of orsolobidae spider that is endemic to New Zealand.

== Taxonomy ==
This species was described in 1985 by Ray Forster and Norman Platnick from a single male specimen collected near Taupo. The holotype is stored in Otago Museum.

== Description ==
The male is recorded at 1.92 mm (0.076 in) in length. The carapace and abdomen are patterned dorsally.

== Distribution ==
This species is only known from Taupo, New Zealand.

== Conservation status ==
Under the New Zealand Threat Classification System, this species is listed as "Data Deficient" with the qualifiers of "Data Poor: Size", "Data Poor: Trend" and "One Location".
