= Waitati River =

River in New Zealand

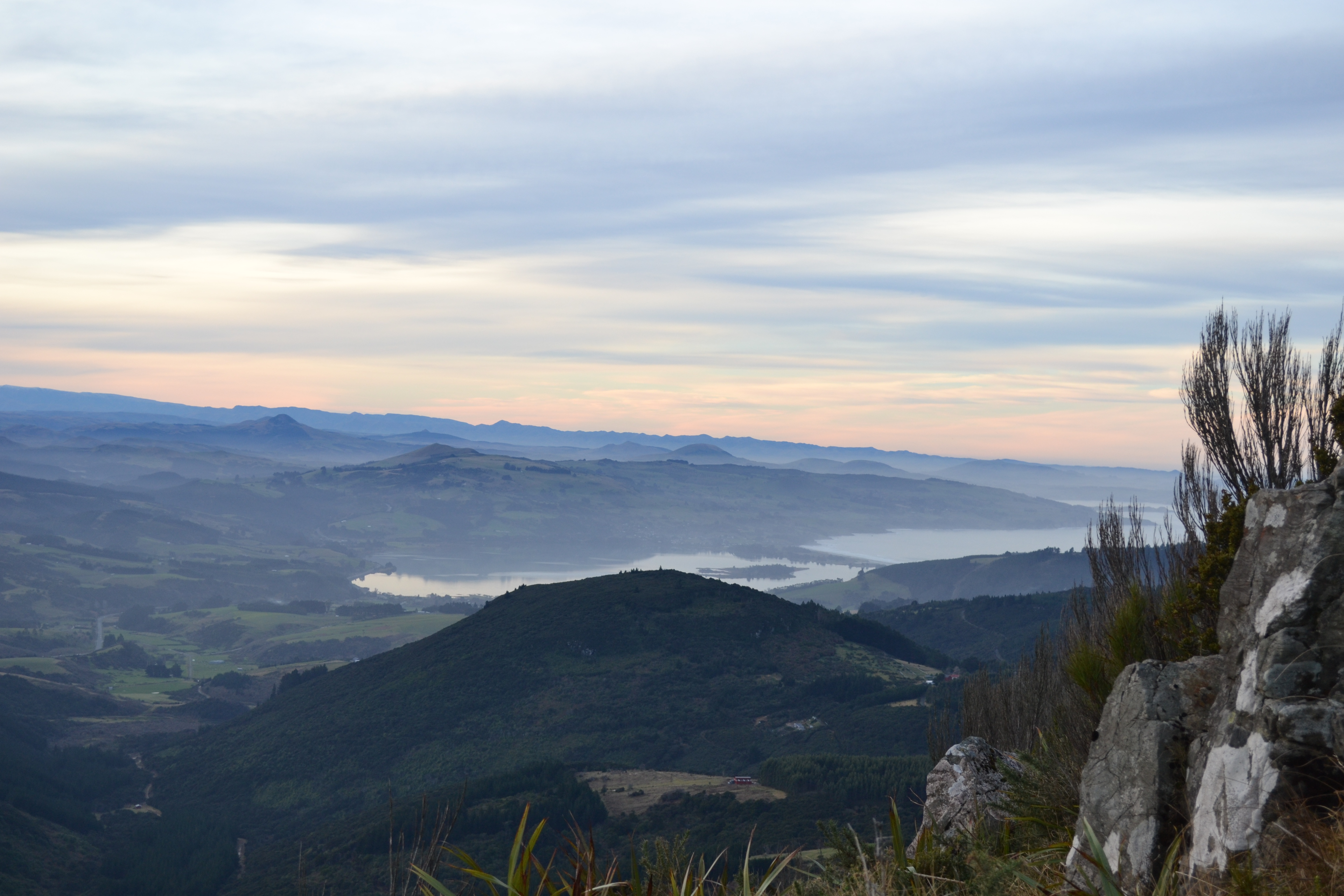
- Route of the Waitati River
- Mouth of the Waitati River Waitati River (South Island)

Location
- Country: New Zealand

Physical characteristics
- Source
  - location: Swampy Summit
  - coordinates: 45°47′38″S 170°29′29″E
- Mouth
  - location: Blueskin Bay
  - coordinates: 45°45′07″S 170°34′41″E

Basin features
- Progression: Waitati River → Blueskin Bay → Pacific Ocean
- Tributaries
  - left: Burns Creek, Fergusons Creek, Semple Burn
  - right: Cedar Creek, Dons Creek

The Waitati River, also known as Waitete, is a river in New Zealand, flowing into the Pacific Ocean at Blueskin Bay, north of Dunedin. The Dunedin Northern Motorway follows the valley of the Waitati between the Leith Saddle and Waitati. The river flows through the town of Waitati before discharging into the Orokonui Lagoon, an estuary of Blueskin Bay.

== See also ==
- List of rivers of New Zealand
