= Blueskin Bay =

Tidal lagoon in New Zealand

- Waiputai (Māori)
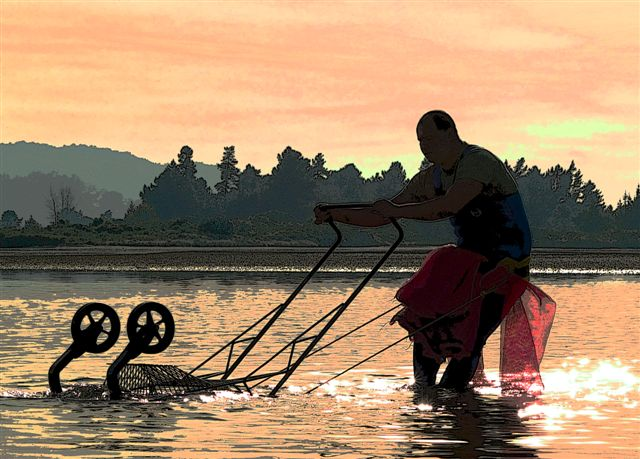
- A person gathers cockles in Blueskin Bay at sunrise
- Interactive map of Blueskin Bay
- Location: Otago, New Zealand
- Coordinates: 45.73°S 170.58°E
- Type: Tidal lagoon / estuary
- Primary inflows: Waitati River, Careys Creek
- Primary outflows: Pacific Ocean (via channel near Rabbit Island)
- Basin countries: New Zealand
- Islands: Rabbit Island

Blueskin Bay is an estuary in coastal Otago, about 25 km north of Dunedin, New Zealand.

The name also unofficially describes the rural district which includes the northern slopes of Mount Cargill, the southern slopes of the Kilmog, and the townships of Doctors Point, Waitati, Evansdale, Warrington, and Seacliff.

== Place names ==
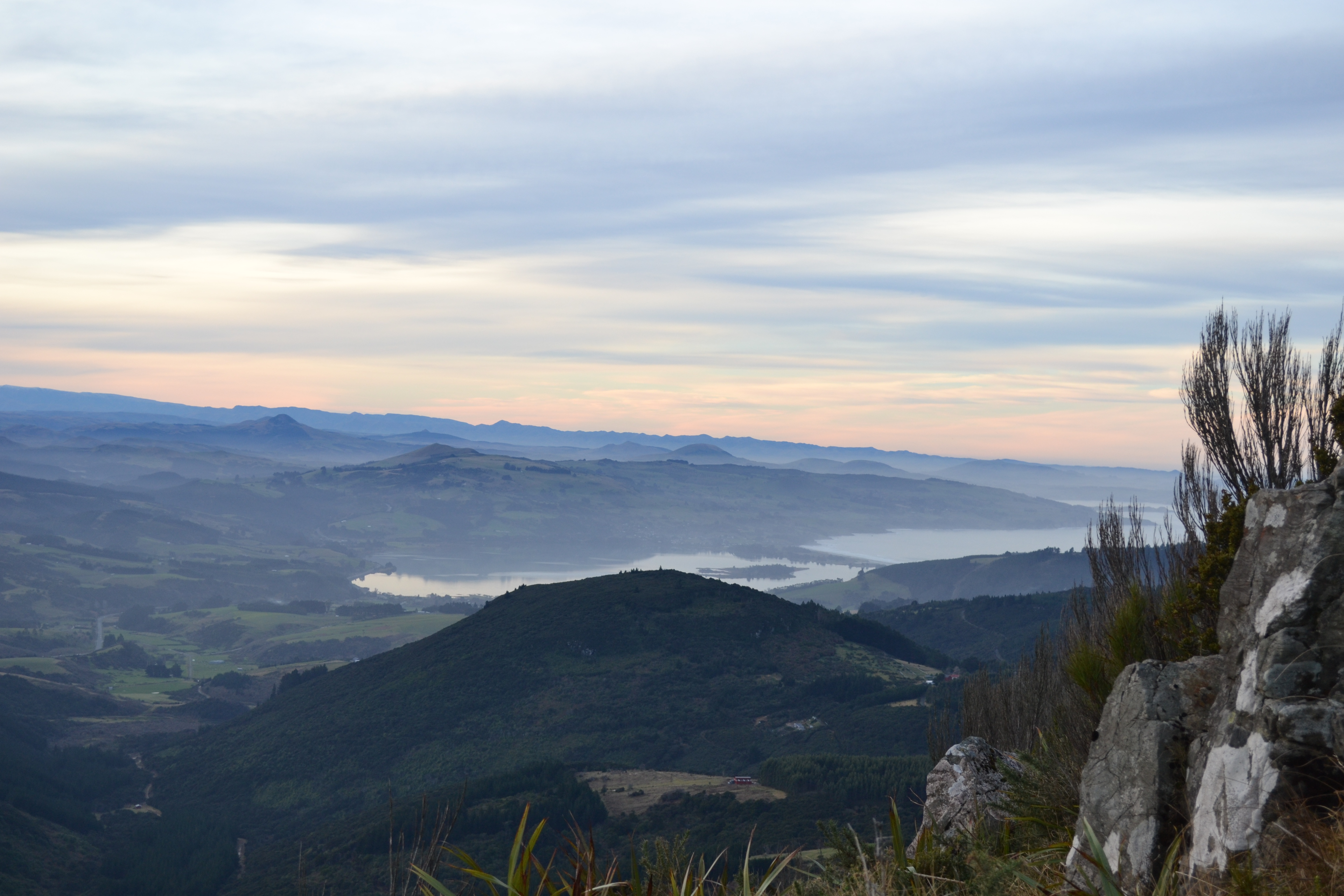
A view of Blueskin Bay from Buttar's Peak, near Mount Cargill

The tidal lagoon is known in Māori as Waiputai. "Blueskin Bay" historically referred to a wider stretch of coast from Heyward Point to Seacliff, including Pūrākaunui. The name Blueskin is after Kahuti, a resident Māori personality of the area, whom Pākehā settlers nicknamed "Blueskin" for the large amount of Tā moko (traditional Māori tattooing) on his body. The name had been used as the nickname of a notorious 18th-century London criminal, Joseph "Blueskin" Blake.

== The estuary ==
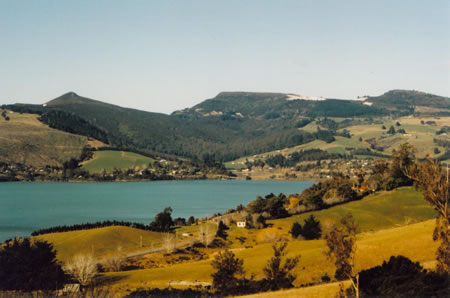
View across Blueskin Bay towards Orokonui Valley

The Waitati River and Careys Creek enter Blueskin Bay at its southwest and northwest corners. A long sand spit from the northern headland closes the bay to a small channel to the Pacific Ocean at the southeast corner. Rabbit Island lies just inside this entrance.

Critically endangered, endemic Hector's dolphins live around the bay.

== Shellfish ==
Blueskin Bay is a popular site for gathering clams, locally known as "cockles". Along with families collecting the shellfish for personal consumption, Southern Clams Ltd collects clams commercially for export.
