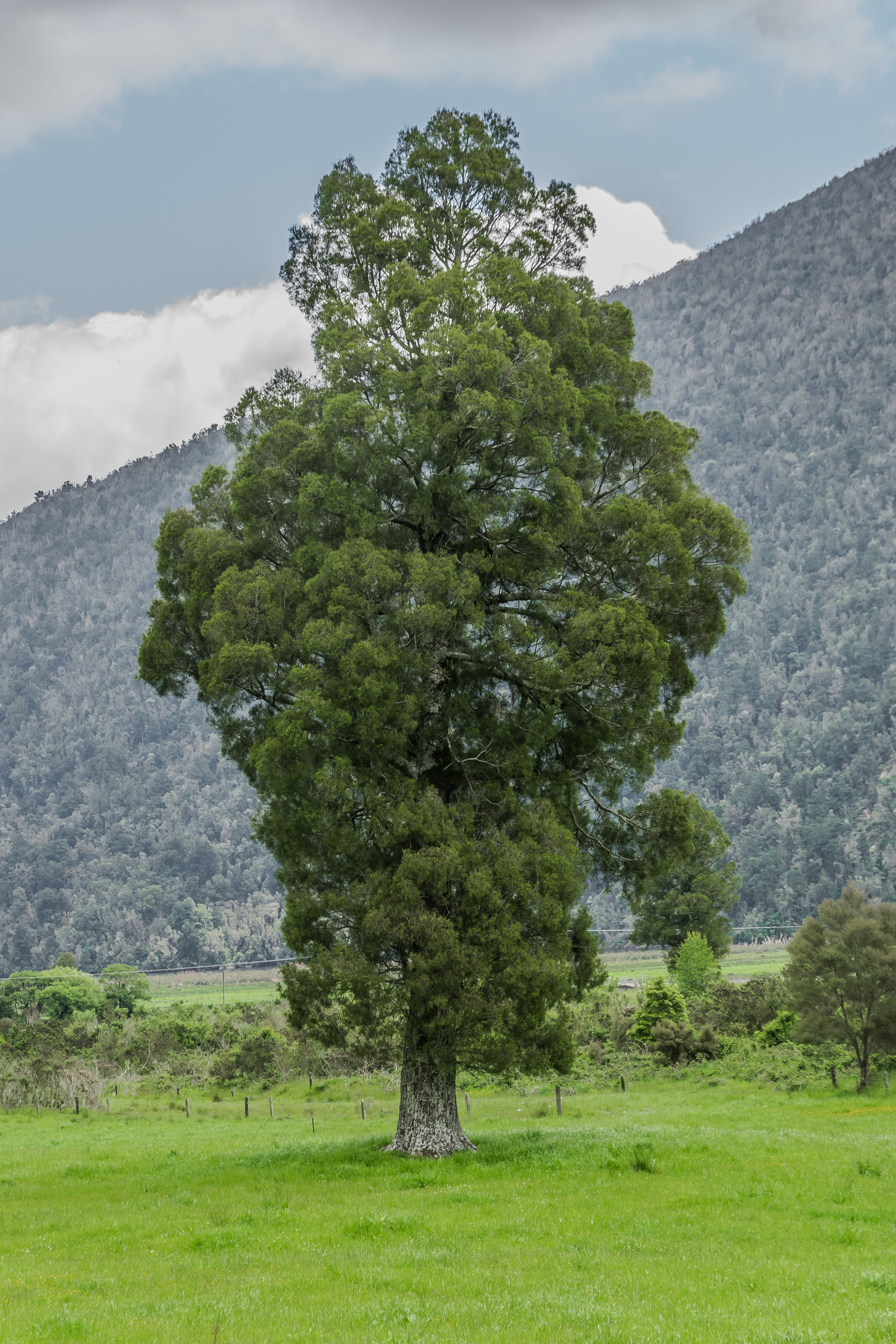
- L. bidwillii in the West Coast Region

Conservation status
- Near Threatened (IUCN 3.1)

Scientific classification
- Kingdom: Plantae
- Clade: Tracheophytes
- Clade: Gymnosperms
- Division: Pinophyta
- Class: Pinopsida
- Order: Cupressales
- Family: Cupressaceae
- Genus: Libocedrus
- Species: L. bidwillii

Binomial name
- Libocedrus bidwillii Hook.f.

= Libocedrus bidwillii =

Species of conifer

Libocedrus bidwillii, also called pāhautea, kaikawaka or New Zealand cedar, is a species of conifer in the cypress family, Cupressaceae, endemic to New Zealand.

== Name ==
Libocedrus bidwillii is named after J. C. Bidwill, the New Zealand botanist and explorer. The species is commonly named by its Māori names, pāhautea or kaikawaka. However, according to DOC botanist Geoff Rogers, pāhautea is preferred correct form.

== Description ==
It is a coniferous tree growing to 25 m tall, with a trunk up to 2.5 m diameter. The foliage is arranged in flattened sprays; the leaves are scale-like, 1.5–2 mm long and 1 mm broad, arranged in opposite decussate pairs on the shoots. The seed cones are cylindrical, 8–12 mm long, with four scales each with a prominent curved spine-like bract; they are arranged in two opposite decussate pairs around a small central columella; the outer pair of scales is small and sterile, the inner pair large, bearing two winged seeds. They are mature about six to eight months after pollination. The pollen cones are 2.5–5 mm long.

The timber seldom becomes commercially available. It is very light in weight and a distinct light purple when cut. The timber in small dimension sizes is prone to spiral and twist when cut. It is sometimes used for lightweight sailing boat construction. It glues and holds ring nails well.

== Distribution and habitat ==
The tree grows in both the North and South Islands; in the North Island, it occurs from Te Aroha southward. It grows at 250–1,200 m altitude in temperate rainforests. It is absent from Stewart Island.

=== Conservation status ===
Libocedrus bidwillii is listed as near-threatened species.

Apart from logging, the main threat of Libocedrus bidwillii comes from possums. Severe possum browse can kill a cedar tree, leaving only stark stag head.

== Gallery ==
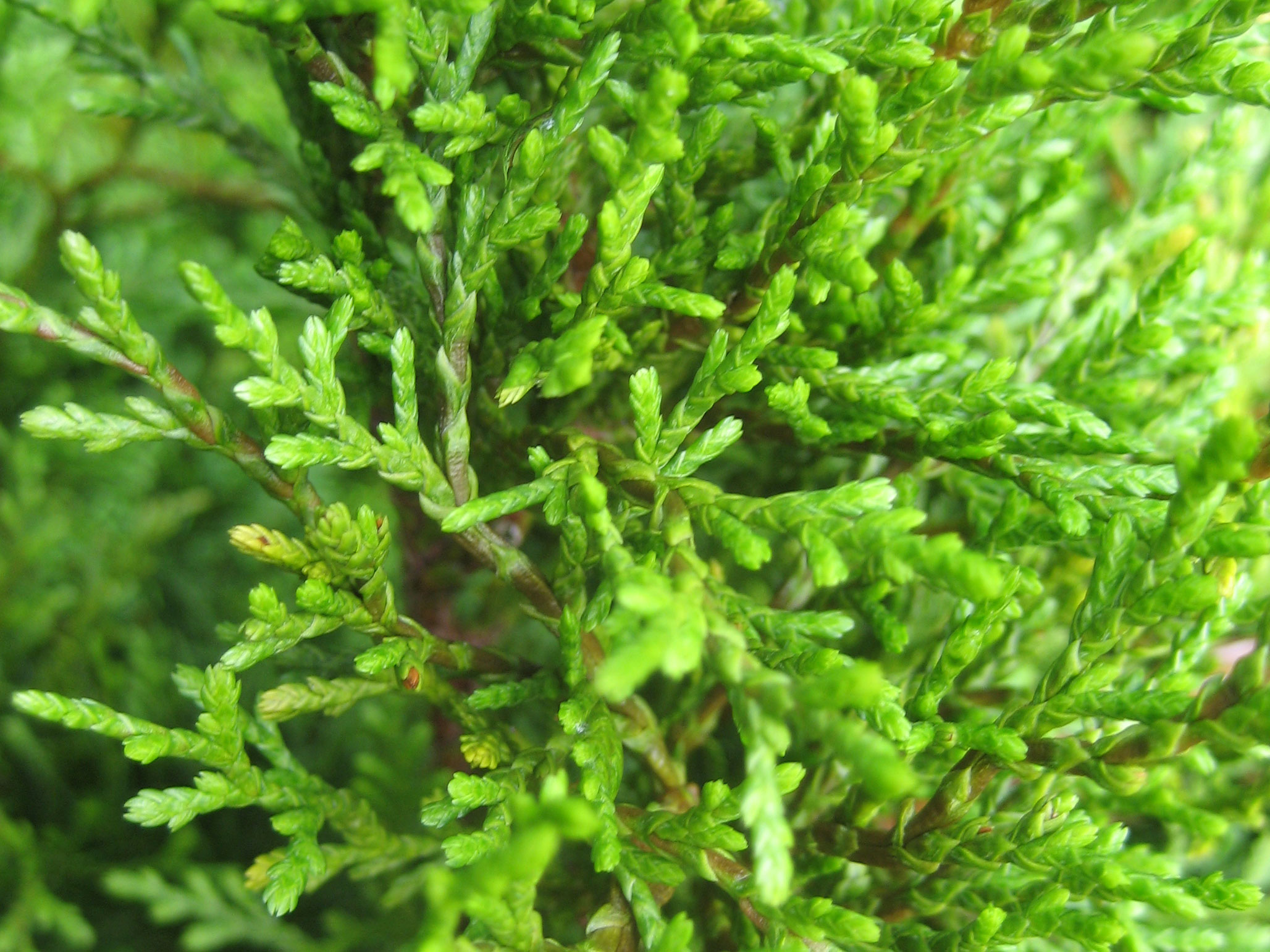
Foliage

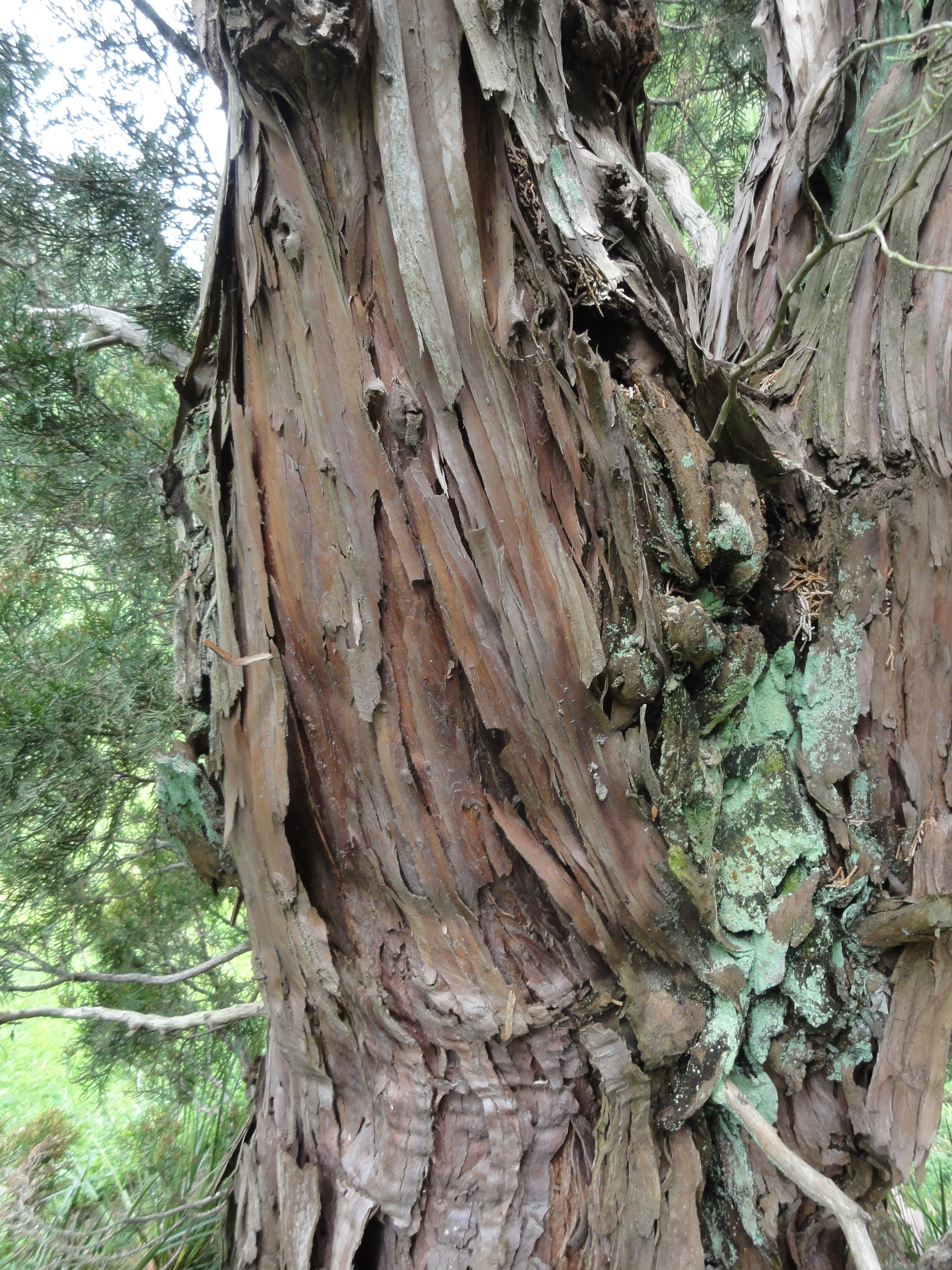
Bark

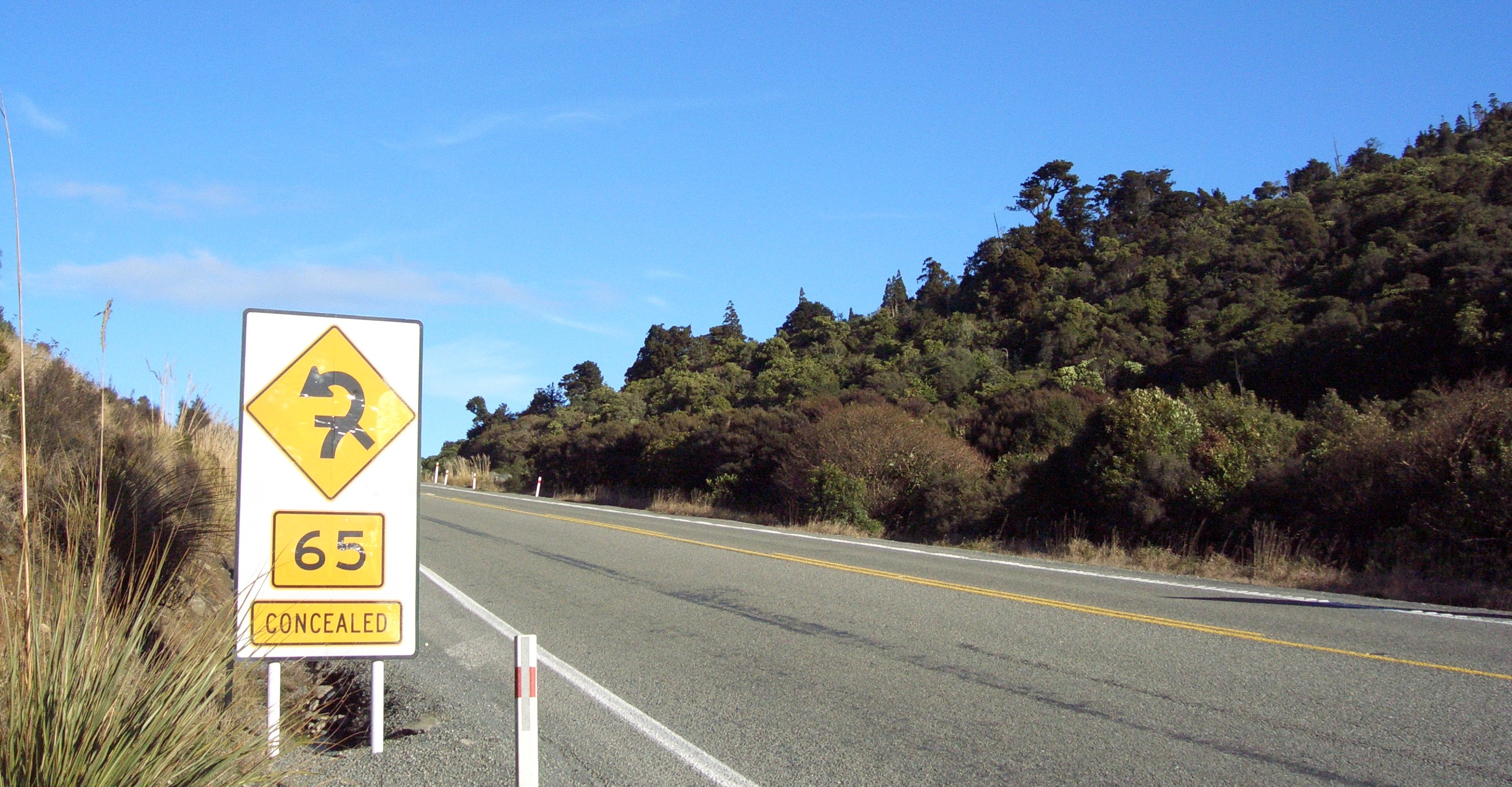
Libocedrus bidwillii on the skyline at Leith Saddle near Dunedin, New Zealand
