= Waitati =

Waitati Waitete
- Town
- Interactive map of Waitati
- Coordinates: 45°45′S 170°34′E
- Country: New Zealand
- Island: South Island
- Region: Otago
- City: Dunedin
- Community board: Waikouaiti Coast Community Board
- Electorates: Dunedin; Te Tai Tonga (Māori)

Government
  - Territorial authority: Dunedin City Council
  - Regional council: Otago Regional Council
  - Mayor of Dunedin: Sophie Barker
  - Dunedin MP: Rachel Brooking
  - Te Tai Tonga MP: Mananui Ramsden

Area
  - Total: 2.69 km^{2} (1.04 sq mi)

Population (June 2025)
  - Total: 590
  - Density: 220/km^{2} (570/sq mi)
- Time zone: UTC+12 (NZST)
  - Summer (DST): UTC+13 (NZDT)
- Area code: 03
- Local iwi: Ngāi Tahu

Waitati, from the Māori Waitete, is a small seaside settlement in Otago, New Zealand, within the city limits of Dunedin. It is located close to the tidal mudflats of Blueskin Bay, 19 kilometres north of the Dunedin city centre. The small Waitati River flows through the bay to the sea.

The Dunedin–Waitati Highway section of State Highway 1, formerly and colloquially called Dunedin Northern Motorway, ends at Waitati; the highway continues north from here at a slightly lower grade of construction with more frequent intersections and accesses. Three km to the north, the highway ascends the notorious Kilmog hill. The Main South Line railway curves from east to north through Waitati. The old station yard remains as a train crossing loop and parts of the old station building are used by rail maintenance workers.

Waitati is home to a branch of the Dunedin Public Libraries, Blueskin Nurseries, a local school, a cafe and general store, and several holiday homes.

== Demographics ==
Waitati-Doctors Point is described by Statistics New Zealand as a rural settlement. It covers 2.69 km^{2} (1.04 sq mi), and had an estimated population of 590 as of June 2025, with a population density of 219 people per km^{2}. It is part of the much larger Mount Cargill statistical area.

Historical population
Year	Pop.	±% p.a.
2006	501	—
2013	513	+0.34%
2018	573	+2.24%

Waitati had a population of 573 at the 2018 New Zealand census, an increase of 60 people (11.7%) since the 2013 census, and an increase of 72 people (14.4%) since the 2006 census. There were 231 households, comprising 276 males and 297 females, giving a sex ratio of 0.93 males per female, with 120 people (20.9%) aged under 15 years, 51 (8.9%) aged 15 to 29, 327 (57.1%) aged 30 to 64, and 72 (12.6%) aged 65 or older.

Ethnicities were 90.1% European/Pākehā, 12.6% Māori, 1.6% Pasifika, 2.6% Asian, and 5.8% other ethnicities. People may identify with more than one ethnicity.

Although some people chose not to answer the census's question about religious affiliation, 61.3% had no religion, 24.1% were Christian, 1.6% had Māori religious beliefs, 0.5% were Hindu, 1.0% were Buddhist and 4.7% had other religions.

Of those at least 15 years old, 201 (44.4%) people had a bachelor's or higher degree, and 45 (9.9%) people had no formal qualifications. 93 people (20.5%) earned over $70,000 compared to 17.2% nationally. The employment status of those at least 15 was that 225 (49.7%) people were employed full-time, 78 (17.2%) were part-time, and 18 (4.0%) were unemployed.

== Alternative lifestylers and activism ==
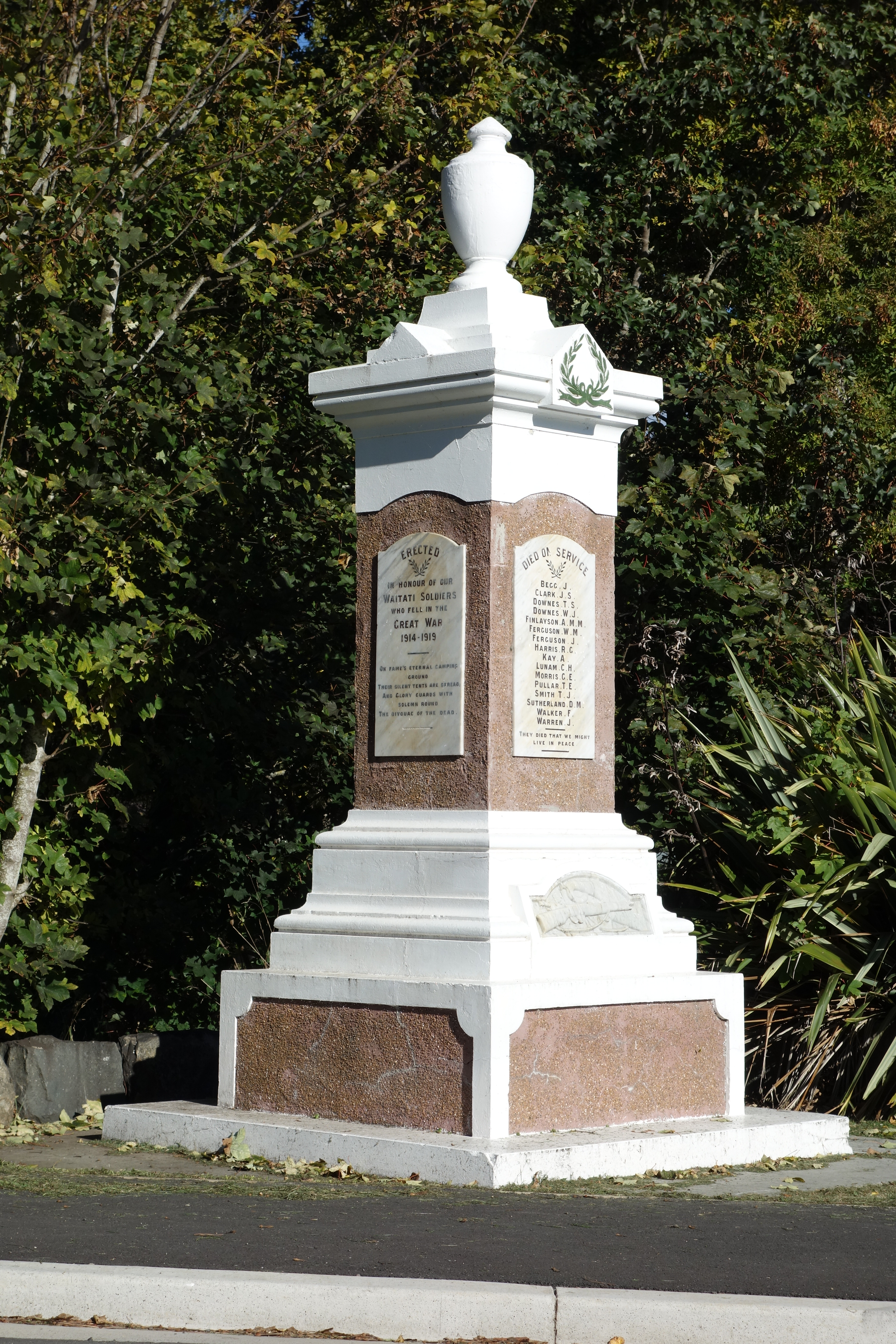
Waitati war memorial commemorating fallen World War I soldiers

For many years Waitati has been known for its appeal to those who pursue an alternative lifestyle. The Waitati Militia, a mock combat group, was founded here, and the village featured in the history of the Values Party, Mushroom magazine and anti Vietnam War and Aramoana aluminium smelter protests, as well as the development in New Zealand of environmental education.

Waitati has no sewerage system, and has become a centre in New Zealand for the development of composting toilets and other alternative sewage disposal systems. Some villagers are edible garden and alternative energy enthusiasts.

Waitati has become an arrival point for German immigrants to New Zealand and has a high proportion of Germans and German New Zealanders.

The Orokonui Ecosanctuary wildlife sanctuary is set in an area of native bush here. Doctors Point Beach is a sandy southern beach that is home to a breed of blue penguins and other wildlife.

Waitati Film Society screens films every second Tuesday night during most of the year (every Tuesday night in the middle of winter).

Waitati is part of New Zealand's "Transition Towns initiatives", initiative, using some Transition Towns techniques and patterns for energy descent.

== Education ==
Waitati School is a full primary school serving years 1 to 8, with a roll of 53 students as at July 2026. The school's history dates back to 1864.

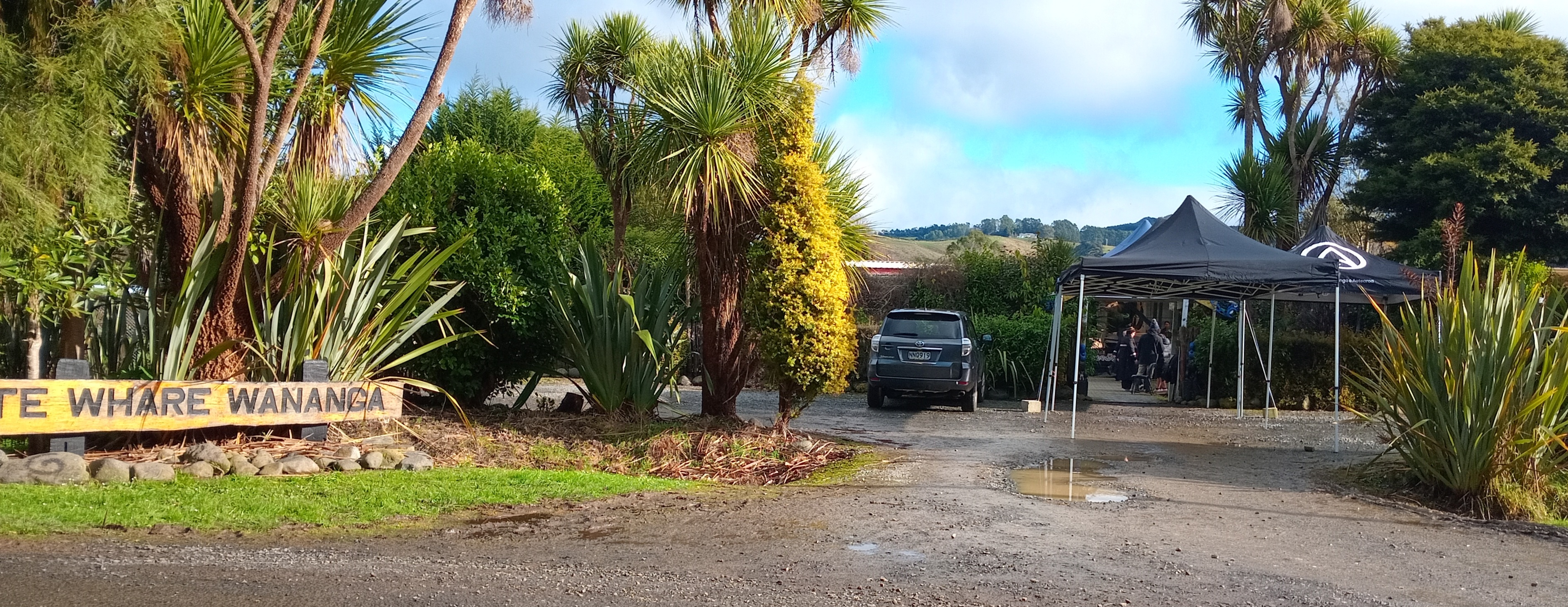
Te Whare Wananga, the marae at Waitati.

Te Whare Wānanga is a marae in Waitati managed by Te Whānau o Arohanui Trust where (as well as many other community activities) courses in social work are taught in association with Otago Polytechnic.

== Notable residents ==
Former Green Party co-leader Metiria Turei lives in Waitati.
