= Seacliff Lunatic Asylum =

Former psychiatric hospital in New Zealand

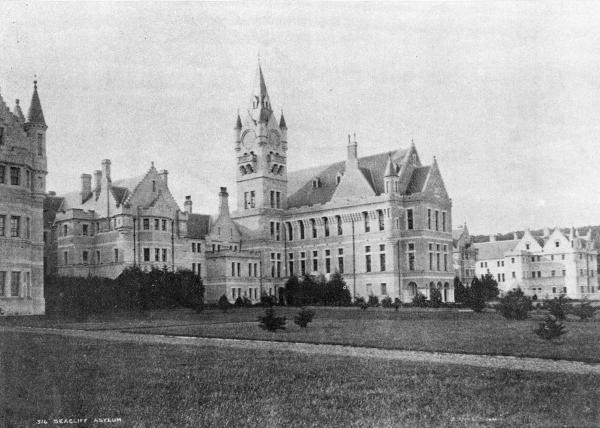

Geography
- Location: Seacliff, New Zealand
- Coordinates: 45.675254°S 170.622091°E

Organisation
- Type: Specialist

Services
- Beds: 500
- Speciality: Psychiatric hospital

History
- Constructed: 1878
- Opened: 1884
- Closed: 1973

Links
- Lists: Hospitals in New Zealand

Seacliff Lunatic Asylum (often Seacliff Asylum, later Seacliff Mental Hospital) was a psychiatric hospital in Seacliff, New Zealand. When built in the late 19th century, it was the largest building in the country, noted for its scale and extravagant architecture. It became infamous for construction faults resulting in partial collapse, as well as a 1942 fire which destroyed a wooden outbuilding, claiming 37 lives (39 in other sources), because the victims were trapped in a locked ward.

The asylum was less than 30 kilometres north of Dunedin and close to the county centre of Palmerston, in an isolated coastal spot within a forested reserve. The site is now divided between the Truby King Recreation Reserve, where most of the old buildings have been demolished and most of the area remains dense woodland, and privately owned land where several of the smaller hospital buildings have been renovated completely.

Seacliff is claimed to be haunted by former patients of what was the country's biggest building at the time.

== History ==
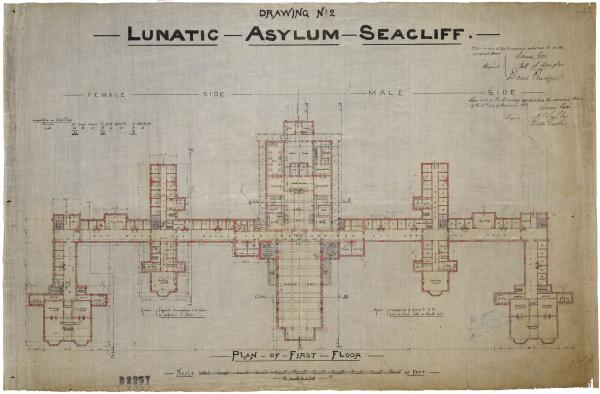
New Zealand's largest building was an exercise in Gothic Revival architecture, but its facades belied the utilitarianism of its repetitious interior.

=== Planning ===
The need for a new asylum in the Dunedin area was created by the Otago gold rush expansion of the city, and triggered by the inadequacy of the Littlebourne Mental Asylum. In 1875, the Provincial Council decided to build a new structure on "a reserve of fine land at Brinn's Point, north of Port Chalmers". Initial work was begun in the "dense trackless forest" in 1878, though the Director of the Geological Survey criticised the site location, because he felt that the hillside was unstable.

Seacliff Asylum was one of the most important works of Robert Lawson, a New Zealand architect of the 19th century. Known for designing in a range of styles, including the Gothic Revival, he started work on the new asylum in 1874, and was involved with it until the completion of the main block in 1884. At that time, it was New Zealand's largest building, and was to house 500 patients and 50 staff. It had cost NZ$78,000 to construct.

Architecturally, Lawson's work on the asylum was very exuberant, making some of his previous designs look comparatively tame. The asylum had turrets on corbels projecting from nearly every corner, with the gabled roof line dominated by a large tower complete with further turrets and a spire. The building contained four and a half million bricks made of local clay on the site and was 225 metres long by 67 metres wide. The great central tower of 50 m height, an essential element of many revivalist designs, was also proposed to double as an observation tower if inmates should try to escape.

It was later said of the building and its (forlorn) location that: "The Victorians might not have wanted their lunatics living with them, but they liked to house them grandly."

The asylum was progressively added to in later years as it was transformed to function as a working farm, though most of the newer buildings were much simpler wooden structures. Staff lived in separate accommodation close to the wards, and they were able to socialise in nearby Dunedin.

=== Faults ===
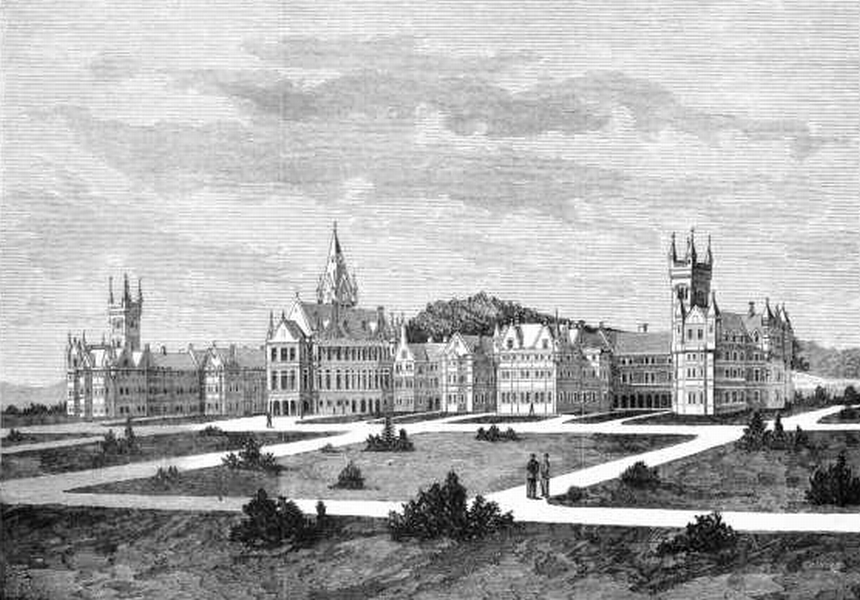
The hospital in 1884, with the main buildings completed.

Structural problems began to manifest themselves even before the first building was completed, and in 1887, only three years after the opening of the main block, a major landslide occurred – predicted as a risk by the surveyors – and affected a temporary building.

Problems with the design's stability could no longer be ignored even at the time, and in 1888 an enquiry into the collapse was set up. In February of that year, realising that he could be in legal trouble, Lawson applied to the enquiry to be allowed counsel to defend him. During the enquiry all involved in the construction – including the contractor, the head of the Public Works Department, the projects clerk of works and Lawson himself – gave evidence to support their competence. The enquiry decided that it was the architect who carried the ultimate responsibility, and Lawson was found both 'negligent and incompetent'. This may be considered an unreasonable finding as the nature of the site's underlying bentonite clays was beyond contemporary knowledge of soil mechanics, with Lawson singled out to bear the blame (but this disregards the fact that the site's problems had been pointed out by the surveyors). As New Zealand was at this time suffering an economic recession, Lawson found himself virtually unemployable.

The main block survived until 1959, when it was demolished because of further earth movement.

=== Treatment ===
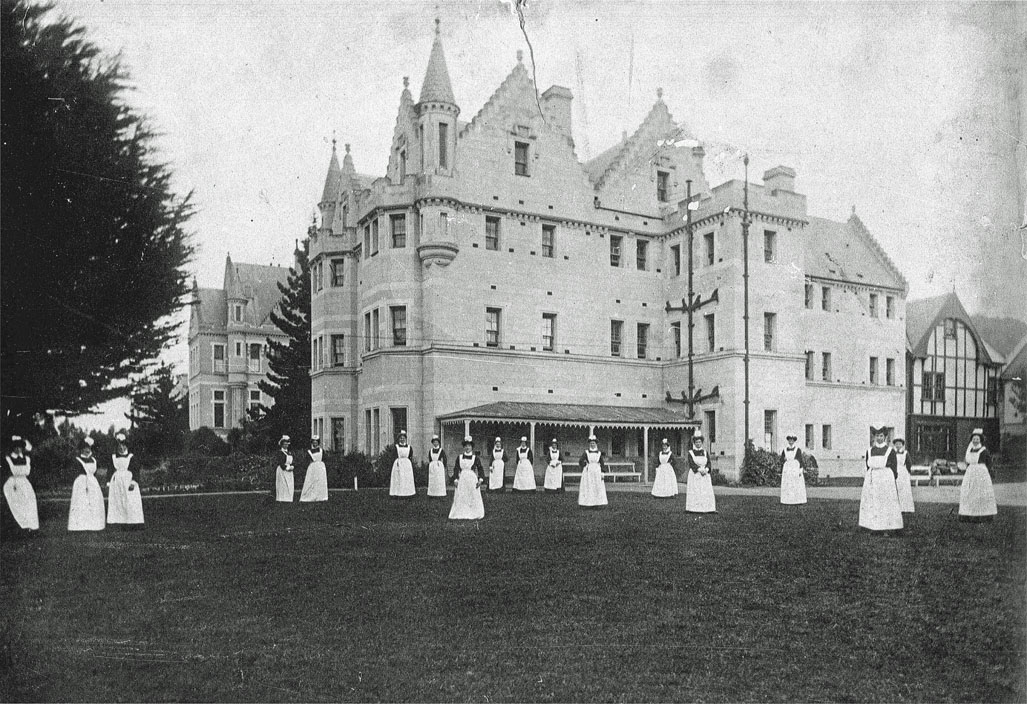
Picture of nurses on front lawn of Seacliff Lunatic Asylum, 1890.

Treatment of the patients at Seacliff, whether insane, intellectually disabled or held in the institution for what would today be classed as simply being difficult, was often very callous, even cruel, a feature of many mental asylums of the times. Janet Frame, a writer, was held at the asylum during the 1940s and wrongly diagnosed as a schizophrenic. In her autobiography, she recalled that:

"The attitude of those in charge, who unfortunately wrote the reports and influenced the treatment, was that of reprimand and punishment, with certain forms of medical treatment being threatened as punishment for failure to 'co-operate' and where 'not co-operate' might mean a refusal to obey an order, say, to go to the doorless lavatories with six others and urinate in public while suffering verbal abuse by the nurse for being unwilling. 'Too fussy are we? Well, Miss Educated, you’ll learn a thing or two here."

Frame describes other patients being beaten for bedwetting, and that all patients tended to continually look for the possibility of running away. She only escaped lobotomy at Seacliff because of her new-found public success; she had won a literary prize while in the institution. Others were not so fortunate, being forced to submit to what today would be considered barbaric procedures such as the 'unsexing' operation (removal of fallopian tubes, ovaries and clitoris) of Annemarie Anon [sic] in what was at the time considered a 'successful' treatment. Electroconvulsive therapy was also widely used.

At the same time, Seacliff was groundbreaking in some parts of its treatment programme, with noted medical reformer Truby King appointed Medical Superintendent in 1889, a position he held for 30 years. Patients were 'prescribed' fresh air, exercise, good nutrition and productive work (for example, in on-site laundries, gardens, and a forge) as part of their therapeutic regime. King is credited as having turned what was essentially conceived as a prison into an efficient working farm. Another of King's innovations, was his implementation of small dormitories housed in buildings adjacent to the larger asylum. This style of accommodation has been considered the forerunner to the villa system later adopted by all mental health institutions in New Zealand.

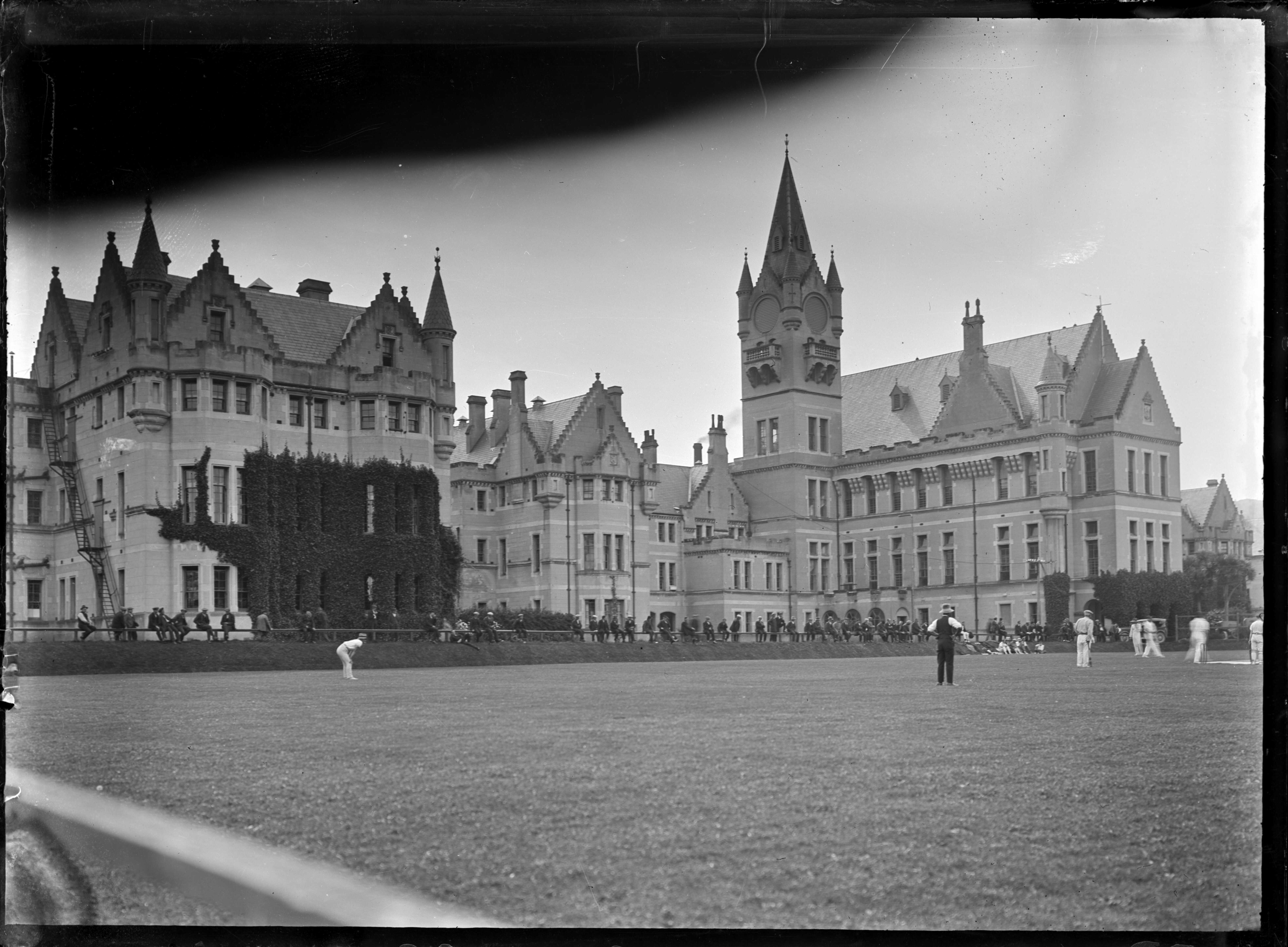
Seacliff Mental Hospital ca. 1926 during a cricket match

A nurse working at the hospital in the later years of its operation describes the situation much less critically than Frame, noting that while many patients at Seacliff during her time (1940s) would not have been confined in modern days, the atmosphere was more like that of a large working community. Patients capable of working were asked to help with various duties, partly because of staff shortages in World War II. Unless considered dangerous, patients were allowed some liberties, such as being allowed to go fishing – an activity that provided patients with leisure time, while also helping the fishing business Truby King had long ago established at nearby Karitane.

=== Fatal fire ===
Around 9:45 pm on 8 December 1942, a fire broke out in Ward 5 of the hospital (also called the 'Simla' building). Ward 5 was a two-storey wooden structure added onto the original construction, holding 39 (41 according to some sources) female patients. All patients had been locked into their rooms or into the 20-bed dormitory, partially because World War II had caused a nursing staff shortage. Checks were made only once an hour.

After the fire was noticed by a male attendant, the hospital's firefighters tried to extinguish the flames with water from a close-by hydrant, while two women were saved from rooms that did not have locked shutters. However, the flames were too strong, and after an hour the ward was reduced to ashes, though the fire was kept from spreading to other buildings. All patients who remained in Ward 5 are thought to have died from suffocation from smoke inhalation.

An inquiry into the fire criticised the lack of nursing staff, but praised the firefighters for their prompt and valiant actions, including the quick evacuation of many other patients in nearby threatened buildings. It also remarked on the critical absence of sprinklers (present in other new sections of the institution), and recommended their installation in all psychiatric institutions. The cause of the fire was not found, though there was speculation about an electrical short circuit due to shifting foundations. The disaster remained New Zealand's worst loss of life in a fire until the Ballantyne's store disaster in Christchurch five years later.

=== Aftermath ===
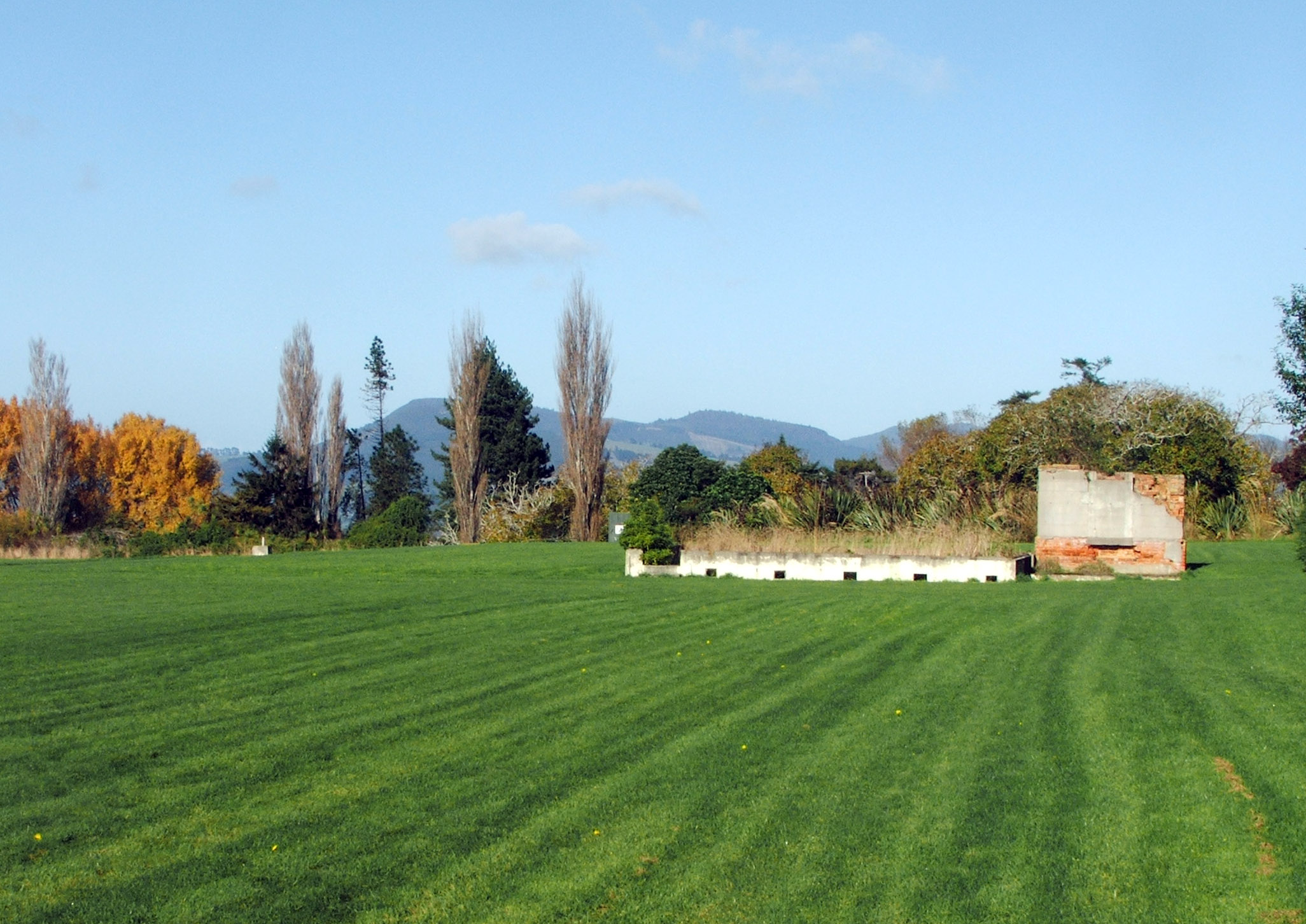
Little remains on the Truby King Reserve of the hospital other than a few building foundations.

Primarily as a result of worsening ground conditions which progressively affected many of the buildings, the hospital functions of Seacliff were progressively moved to Cherry Farm, closing in 1973. The site was subdivided, with the land surrounding the original building site later becoming Truby King Recreation Reserve, having passed into the ownership of Dunedin City in 1991. Around 80% of the reserve is densely wooded, with the area commonly called the 'Enchanted Forest'. The last remaining building in the reserve was demolished due to structural faults in 1992, after an initiative to establish a transport museum had failed.

The remaining area of hospital buildings outside the Reserve is privately owned. In the summer of 2006-2007, regular guided tours of the hospital grounds were operated in conjunction with the Taieri Gorge Railway's Seasider tourist train service.

In November 2023, a femur and patient tag were found in a shallow grave under a tree in the reserve, leading to a police investigation. The femur was found to be an animal bone.

== See also ==
- List of disasters in New Zealand by death toll
- Janet Frame, the most famous of the asylum's patients / inmates
- Truby King, medical reformer, administrator of the asylum for 30 years
- Lionel Terry, a schizophrenic white supremacist murderer who died at Seacliff, after several escapes
