= Seacliff, New Zealand =

Seacliff
- Village
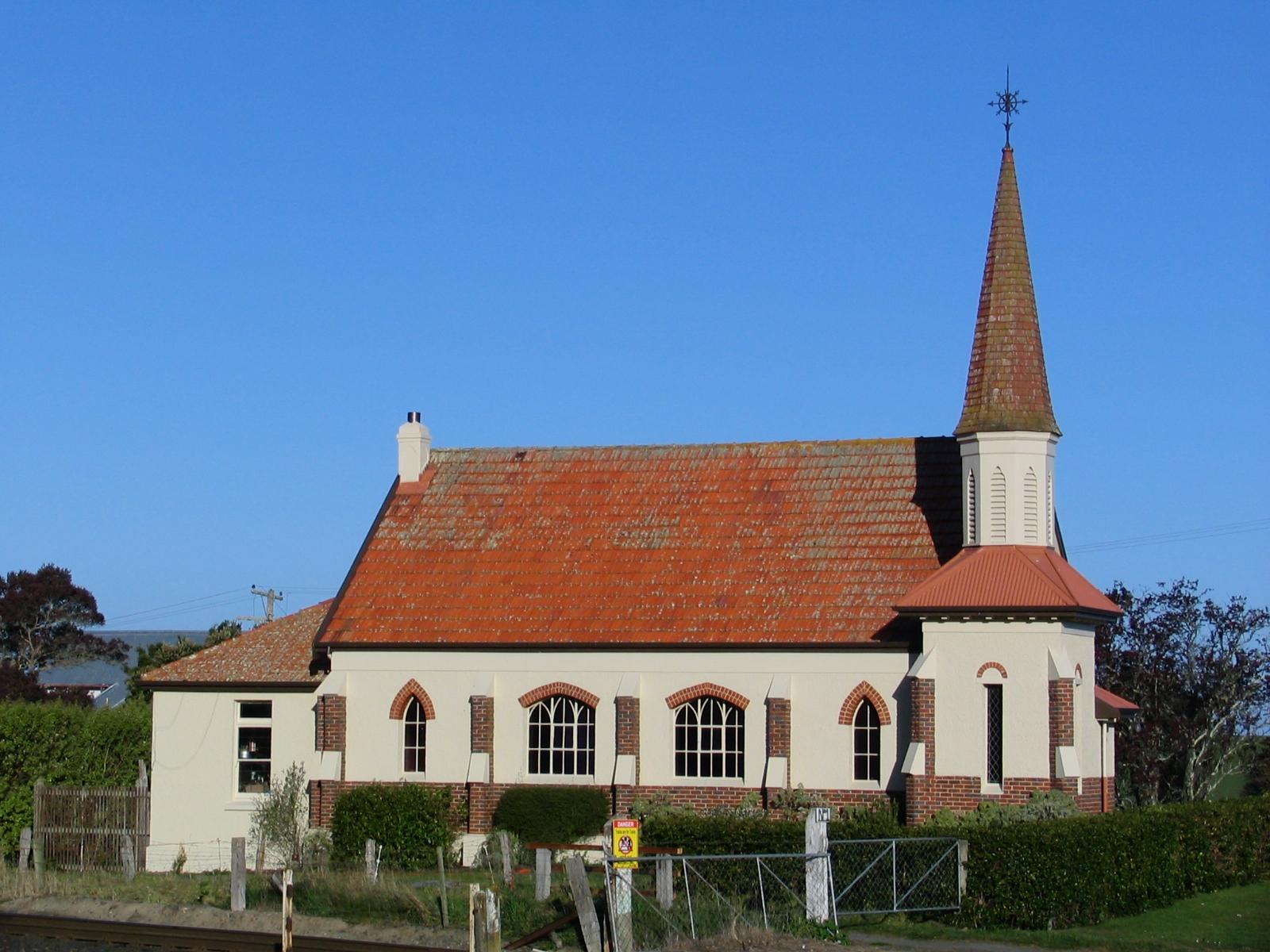
- Former Catholic church in Seacliff

- Location of Seacliff within New Zealand
- Coordinates: 45°41′S 170°37′E
- Country: New Zealand
- Region: Otago
- Territorial authority: Dunedin City Council

Population (approx.)
  - Total: 100
- Time zone: UTC+12 (NZST)
  - Summer (DST): UTC+13 (NZDT)
- Local iwi: Ngāi Tahu

Seacliff is a small village located north of Dunedin in the Otago region of New Zealand's South Island. The village lies roughly halfway between the estuary of Blueskin Bay and the mouth of the Waikouaiti River at Karitane, on the eastern slopes of Kilmog hill. Coast Road, an old route north from Dunedin, and the South Island Main Trunk Railway pass through the village.

== History ==
Seacliff is the site of the former Seacliff Lunatic Asylum, a mental institution built in the late 19th century and, for many years, the nation's largest public building. The hospital was designed by architect Robert Lawson and managed for many years by Sir Frederic Truby King, who also founded New Zealand's Plunket, a post-natal health charity. Writer Janet Frame was notable among the mental institution many patients. A commemorative plaque on a magnolia tree commemorates the years Janet Frame spent at Seacliff Lunatic Asylum. In 1942, just prior to Frame's first admission, the mental institution was the site of one of the nation's major disasters when a massive fire engulfed the fifth ward, resulting in the death of 37 of the 39 female residents who remained locked in their cells.

Seacliff Lunatic Asylum was long affected by structural issues as a result of its poor foundation, which ultimately contributed to its relocation to Cherry Farm. The remaining buildings were proposed to be a museum of transport and technology, but, after several years of acquiring items for display, the project was never realised. Several exhibits planned for the museum were subsequently relocated to the Otago Settlers' Museum in Dunedin. The area is now a recreation reserve named, after Sir Frederic Truby King, the Truby King Reserve, although the remaining buildings are currently privately owned.

The streets in Seacliff include Kilgour Street (the main street that runs through the village), Palmer Street, the Coast Road and Russell Road, which leads to the Truby King Reserve.

One of Seacliff's claims to fame is the town's victory in the inaugural championship of New Zealand's annual knockout football competition, the 1923 Chatham Cup, wherein the locals beat Wellington's YMCA four goals to nil.

== Seacliff now ==
Seacliff is settled by several families, some of whom commute to Dunedin for work and school, and a handful of artists who keep studios in the village.
