= The Kilmog =

Hilly area near Dunedin, New Zealand

Coordinates: 45.69°S 170.57°E

The Kilmog, occasionally called Kilmog Hill and known in Māori as Kirimoko, is a hilly area approximately 20 kilometres north of Dunedin, New Zealand, on State Highway 1, to the north of Blueskin Bay and south of Karitane. Technically more a series of hills than a single hill, it lies between the south branch of the Waikouaiti River and the Pacific Ocean, and reaches its highest point at the 431 m (1436 ft) Hammond Hill, close to the farming community of Merton. A second peak, Porteous Hill, lies at the southern end of the Kilmog, rising to 395 m (1317 ft).

The name is better known as that of a steep stretch of State Highway 1, where this main state highway traverses a section of these hills between Waitati and Waikouaiti. In the five kilometre stretch from Evansdale, at the northern end of Blueskin Bay, SH1 climbs from sea level to an altitude of 300 m — the highest point on the highway south of Amberley in north Canterbury. Most of the road is three lanes, with two lanes for uphill traffic on each side of the hill, and a passing lane for southbound traffic on a relatively flat alignment near the summit. The highway is sometimes closed by snow in winter.

The area is sparsely inhabited; other than farms around Merton only the coastal stretch is inhabited, with a string of small settlements stretching along the coast from Warrington in the south to Puketeraki in the north, most notably Seacliff.

The geology of the Kilmog is predominantly a basaltic intrusion into a raised section of the Otago peneplain, the latter mostly Cretaceous schist, over which is a deposit of sandstone with some quartz. Most of the area is prone to slumping, which leads to regular maintenance for the highway. The instability of the land also led to the disgrace of architect Robert Lawson, whose Seacliff Lunatic Asylum was structurally affected, and to the replacement of a railway tunnel on the South Island Main Trunk line by a cutting.

A narrow winding scenic alternative route bypassing the Kilmog follows the coast past the settlements of Warrington and Seacliff, but this is of a relatively poor standard and is not recommended for heavy vehicles.

The hill's name, though occasionally disputed, is widely believed to be a corruption of the Southern Māori word kirimoko, kilimoko or kilimogo, the name of a species of mānuka tree used by early Māori for brewing a kind of tea.
