= List of New Zealand place name etymologies =

Placenames in New Zealand derive largely from British and Māori origins. An overview of naming practices can be found at New Zealand place names.

== A ==
- Ahuroa – from Māori: Ahuroa, descriptive name derived from a nearby hill.
- Akaroa – from South Island Māori: Akaroa lit. 'long harbour', equivalent to standard Māori Whangaroa.
- Albany – named after Albany in Australia, as they were both fruit-growing areas
- Albert Town – named after Prince Albert of Saxe-Coburg and Gotha, Prince Consort to Queen Victoria.
- Alexandra – named after Alexandra of Denmark, the wife of Edward, Prince of Wales, later King Edward VII.
- Aoraki – from South Island Māori Aoraki, name is often glossed as "Cloud Piercer" or "cloud in the sky" but literally it consists of ao "cloud" and raki "sky".
- Aotearoa – the common Māori name for New Zealand since the early 20th century; previously exclusively used for the North Island. Usually glossed as Land of the Long White Cloud. From ao: cloud, tea: white, roa: long
- Aramoana – from Māori: Aramoana lit. "pathway to (or beside) the sea". According to George Griffiths and Maarire Goodall the name refers to a track rather than an area of land.
- Arapohue – a common name applied to several species of climbing plants e.g. Calystegia sepium.
- Auckland – in honour of George Eden, 1st Earl of Auckland, a patron of William Hobson, Hobson founded the city of Auckland.
- Auckland Islands - in honour of William Eden, 1st Baron Auckland, the father of George Eden for whom the city of Auckland is named.

== B ==
- Balclutha – named due to the town's position on the Clutha River, known as Clutha Ferry before a bridge was constructed over the river.
- Balfour – named after either a Waimea Company employee or the Otago Provincial Surveyor James Mulville Balfour.
- Birdling's Flat – named after the Birdling's Flat estate, which derives her name from William Birdling.
- Blackball – named after the Black Ball Shipping Line, which leased land in the area for coal mining.
- Brighton – named after Brighton, England, the name was given in hope that Brighton could become as popular as her English namesake.
- Burkes Pass – named after Michael John Burke, who discovered the pass in 1855.
- Burnham – named after Burnham Beeches, Buckinghamshire, by a pioneer who was born there.

== C ==
- Canterbury – after the city and archdiocese of Canterbury in England.
- Cape Farewell – named due to being the last part of New Zealand seen by Captain James Cook and his crew in 1770 before beginning their homeward voyage.
- Cape Kidnappers – named after an attempt by local Māori to abduct one of the crew of Capt. James Cook's ship Endeavour in 1769.
- Carterton – named after Charles Carter, settler advocate and provincial politician.
- Chatham Islands - named after John Pitt, 2nd Earl of Chatham, who was the First Lord of the Admiralty in 1791, when HMS Chatham reached the island.
- Christchurch – after Christ Church, one of the colleges of the University of Oxford in England.
- Clive – named after Robert Clive.
- Clutha River – from the Gaelic form of Clyde.
- Coalgate – named as the "gateway" to coalfields in inland Canterbury.
- Collingwood – after Admiral Cuthbert Collingwood.
- Cook Strait – named by James Cook himself, but likely at the behest of his officers as Cook was not known to name places after himself.
- Coonoor – named after Coonoor, India.
- Coromandel, from the Coromandel Peninsula, named after HMS Coromandel, herself named after the Coromandel Coast.
- Cromwell – origin unknown, possibly after Oliver Cromwell.

== D ==
- Dannevirke – settled by Danish immigrants and named after the Danevirke, a defensive formation constructed across the neck of the Jutland Peninsula during the Viking Age. Its name means "Danes' works" in the Danish language.
- Dargaville – named after the founder of the town Joseph McMullen Dargaville (1837–1896)
- Douglas – named after the Earl of Douglas.
- Dunedin – Originally planned to be named New Edinburgh after the Scottish capital, it was instead decided to name it Dunedin after the Old Celtic form of Edinburgh.

== F ==
- Fairlie – named after Fairlie, North Ayrshire, Scotland.
- Featherston – named after Isaac Featherston, who was Superintendent of Wellington Province.
- Foveaux Strait – named after Joseph Foveaux, who was Lieutenant-Governor of New South Wales who relaxed a ban on sealing in the area.

== G ==
- Gisborne – named after William Gisborne
- Gladstone (multiple localities) – named after British Prime Minister William Ewart Gladstone.
- Glenorchy – likely after Glen Orchy, Scotland.
- Gore – for an early Governor of New Zealand, Sir Thomas Gore Browne.
- Greymouth – named for its location at the mouth of the Grey River, which is named after Sir George Grey.

== H ==
- Haast – named after Julius von Haast, a German geologist knighted for his services to New Zealand geology.
- Hamilton – Named after Captain John Fane Charles Hamilton, commander of HMS Esk, who was killed in the battle of Gate Pa.
- Hampden – named after English politician John Hampden.
- Hastings – named after Englishman Warren Hastings the first Governor-General of Bengal.
- Hauraki Gulf – either Māori for north wind or the name of a person.
- Hawke's Bay – in honour of Edward Hawke, 1st Baron Hawke of Towton.

== I ==
- Inchbonnie – Scottish term that is descriptive of the scenery, inch meaning a small island.
- Invercargill – A combination of inver a prefix for estuary and the surname of William Cargill, founder of Otago.
- Iwikatea – Maori name for Balclutha, the name literally means 'bleached bones' and is a reference to a battle fought in the area.

== K ==
- Kaikohe – contraction of Māori kaikohekohe lit. 'to eat kohekohe', according to Piipi Tiopira after the sacking of a Māori village the survivors fled into the bush and survived on the berries of kohekohe trees.
- Kaikōura – Contraction of Māori Te Ahi-kai-kouraa- Tamakiterangi, meaning the fire where crayfish were cooked for Tamakiterangi.
- Kermadec Islands - After the captain of L'Espérance Jean-Michel Huon de Kermadec, one of the ships that discovered the Kermadec Islands.
- King Country – district where the Māori King Movement led by King Tawhiao flourished in the 1860s.
- Kirwee – named after Karwi, India, the site of a battle, by retired British Army colonel De Renzie Brett.

== L ==
- Lake Hayes – named for Donald Hay, who came to the area looking for sheep country in 1859.
- Levin – named after William Hort Levin, a director of the Wellington and Manawatu Railway Company, which created the town to service its railway.

== M ==
- Macetown – named after three brothers who found gold in the area, Charles, Harry, and John Mace.
- Mackenzie Basin (or Mackenzie Country) – named by and after James Mackenzie, a Scottish Gaelic shepherd and sheep thief who herded his stolen flocks to the largely unpopulated basin.
- Manukau Harbour – corruption of manuka.
- Martinborough – after the town's founder, John Martin.
- Masterton (Whakaoriori) – after local pioneer Joseph Masters.
- Mata-au – Māori name for the Clutha River, lit. an eddy or current in a body of water.
- Milford Sound – named after Milford Haven, Wales.
- Millers Flat – named after an early European settler of the area, Walter Miller.
- Mount Cook – named after Captain James Cook.

== N ==
- Napier – named after Sir Charles James Napier.
- Naseby, New Zealand – named after either the Battle of Naseby or Naseby, England, birthplace of superintendent of Otago Province John Hyde Harris.
- Nelson – in honour of Horatio Nelson, 1st Viscount Nelson.
- New Brighton – possibly after Brighton.
- New Plymouth – named after Plymouth, Devon, England.

== O ==
- Ophir – after gold was discovered in the area, it was named after where King Solomon obtained the gold to sheath the Temple in Jerusalem.
- Otautahi, Māori name of Christchurch, means 'place of Tautahi', a local chief.
- Otematata – from the Otematata River.

== P ==
- Palmerston and Palmerston North – named after Henry John Temple, 3rd Viscount Palmerston twice Prime Minister of the United Kingdom, both had 'south' and 'north' respectively applied to distinguish them but the southern town had the term 'south' dropped.
- Papatoetoe – Descriptive place name, meaning a flat covered with toetoe in Māori.
- Piopiotahi – Māori name for the Milford Sound, lit. 'single North Island piopio, from a story in Māori mythology: after the death of Maui his pet thrush flew to the sound.
- Plimmerton – from John Plimmer, Wellington pioneer, director of the Wellington and Manawatu Railway Company, which created the seaside resort to help boost its railway; central Wellington has Plimmer's Steps.
- Porirua – Corruption of Māori parirua.

== Q ==
- Queenstown – most probably named after a small town called The Cove in Ireland which was renamed to Queenstown in honour of Queen Victoria in 1850.

== R ==
- Rakiura – Māori name for Stewart Island, lit. 'glowing sky', possibly descriptive of the sunset.
- Ranfurly – named after Uchter Knox, 5th Earl of Ranfurly, former Governor-General of New Zealand.
- Raukawa Moana, Māori name for the Cook Strait, lit. Raukawa 'leaves of the kawakawa' and Moana 'sea'.
- Rotorua - Māori for second lake (first being Lake Rotoiti).

== S ==
- Selwyn River - named after Bishop Selwyn.

== T ==
- Tasman Bay – in honour of Dutchman Abel Tasman, commander of first European ship to sight the country.
- Tauranga – Māori for 'sheltered anchorage'.
- Te Waipounamu – Māori name of the South Island, meaning the greenstone water or 'the water of greenstone'. It may be an alteration of Te Wahi Pounamu, meaning the greenstone place.
- Timaru – from Māori Te Maru lit. 'the shelter'.
- Tiniroto – combination of Māori tini and roto, the name was invented by a surveyvor and ignores the proper grammar of the language.

== W ==
- Waikirikri – Māori name of the Selwyn River, means 'pebbly stream'.
- Waikanae – possibly from Māori waikana lit. 'to stare at water'.
- Waikato River – from Māori Waikato-taniwha-rau lit. 'flowing river of a hundred taniwha'.
- Waipori – corruption of Māori waipouri lit. 'sorrowful river'.
- Whangārei – (See Whangārei#Etymology) unknown origin with several theories proposed.
- Whitianga – from Māori Whitianga a Kupe lit. 'crossing of Kupe'.
- Wellington – in honour of Arthur Wellesley, 1st Duke of Wellington.
- Whitby – from the town of Whitby in Yorkshire, England, home of James Cook.
- Whitecliffs – named after the white clay of the cliffs nearby.

== Thomson's Barnyard ==
Many of the locations in the southern South Island of New Zealand, especially those in Central Otago and the Maniototo, were named by John Turnbull Thomson, who had surveyed the area in the late 1850s. Many of these placenames are of Northumbrian origin, as was Thomson himself.

There is a widespread, probably apocryphal, belief that the naming of many places was through a disagreement with the New Zealand surveying authorities. It has long been suggested that Thomson originally intended to give either classical or traditional Māori names to many places, but these names were refused. In response, Thomson gave prosaic Northumbrian names to them, often simply in the form of a Northumbrian dialectic name for an animal. The Maniototo region around the town of Ranfurly is rife with such names as Kyeburn, Gimmerburn, Hoggetburn, and Wedderburn as a result. Ranfurly itself was originally called "Eweburn". The area is still occasionally referred to as "Thomson's Barnyard" or the "Farmyard Patch".

== External links and sources ==
- Land Information NZ (LINZ) An authoritative list of New Zealand placenames, used for NZ government maps, is available in various forms. The list does not cover their meanings.
- NZ Geographic Board Nga Pou Taunaha Aotearoa – Free download of 55,000 New Zealand placenames. Note: Special care is required, for instance the geographic coordinates are NOT the centroid of the placename, they are the lower left corner of the original label scan from the 260 series maps (1:50 000 Topographic hard copy).
- "Place names map". Māori Language Commission. Archived from the original on 19 January 2008.
