= State Highway 87 (New Zealand) =

Road in New Zealand

State Highway 87

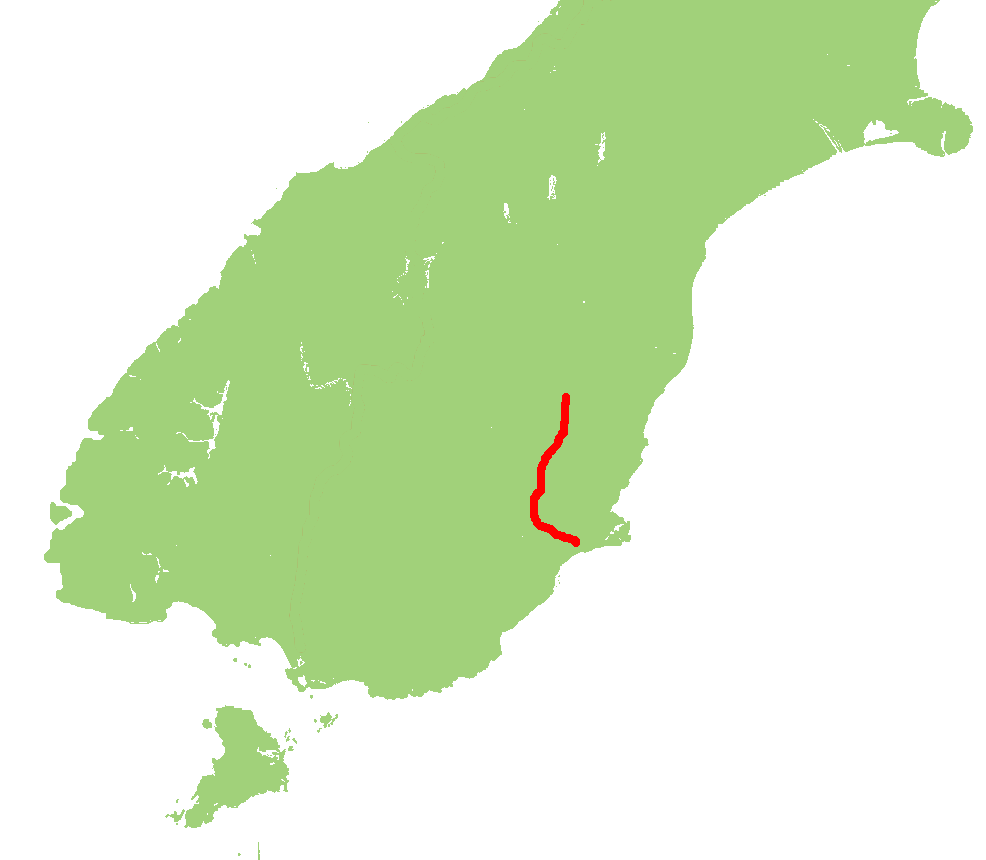

Route information
- Maintained by NZ Transport Agency Waka Kotahi
- Length: 114 km (71 mi)

Major junctions
- Southeast end: SH 1 (Main South/Dunedin Southern Motorway) at Mosgiel
- North end: SH 85 (Kyeburn-Ranfurly Road/Morrisons-Kyeburn Road) at Kyeburn

Location
- Country: New Zealand
- Primary destinations: Outram, Middlemarch, Hyde

Highway system
- New Zealand state highways; Motorways and expressways; List
| ← SH 86 | → SH 88 |

State Highway 87 (SH 87) is a state highway in New Zealand servicing the Taieri Plains and the Strath-Taieri Valley in Otago, connecting Mosgiel to Kyeburn on the eastern flank of the Maniototo Plains.

The highway is two-lane for its entire length, and there are four sets of traffic lights in Mosgiel.

== Route ==
SH 87 leaves SH 1 at a junction at the southwestern end of the Dunedin Southern Motorway, immediately south of Mosgiel. It travels north through the town as its main street, Gordon Road, before heading west along the northern edge of the Taieri Plain. The highway climbs the northeastern flank of Maungatua shortly after passing through Outram (where it crosses the Taieri River), its course becoming northwesterly. The course continues past the small settlements of Lee Stream and Clarks Junction before turning northeastward to head along the broad Strath-Taieri valley. After passing through Sutton, the highway reaches the town of Middlemarch.

From Sutton, the highway runs close to the course of the Taieri River, and from Middlemarch the Otago Central Rail Trail also runs nearby. The highway continues northeast past Hyde before emerging onto the high Maniototo plain. The highway terminates at Kyeburn, 15 km to the east of Ranfurly, at a junction with SH 85.

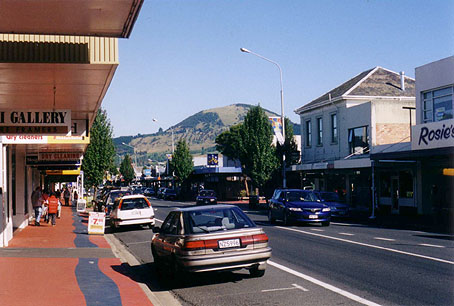
SH 87 as Gordon Road in Mosgiel

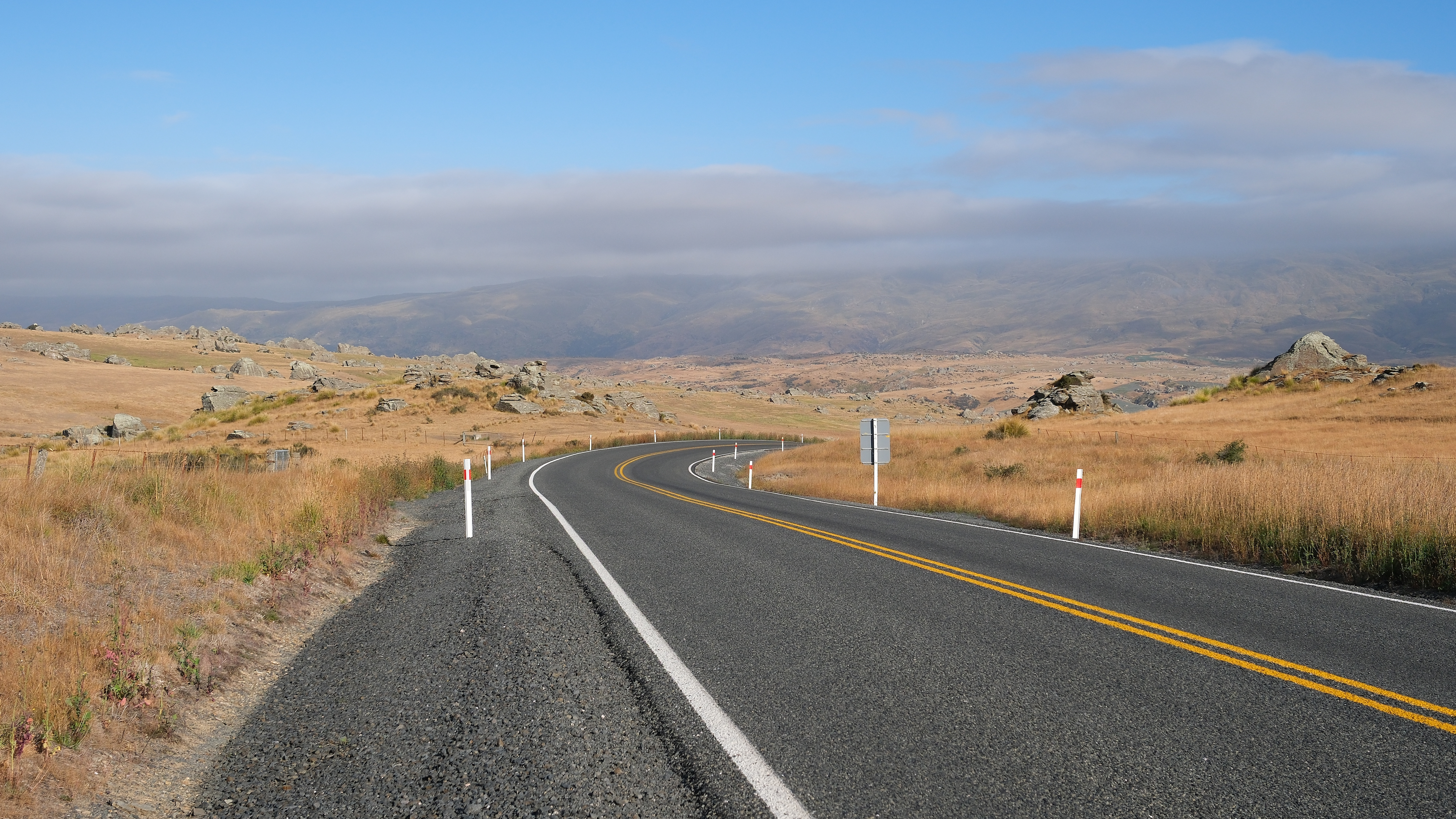
SH 87 entering the dry landscape of the Strath-Taieri valley

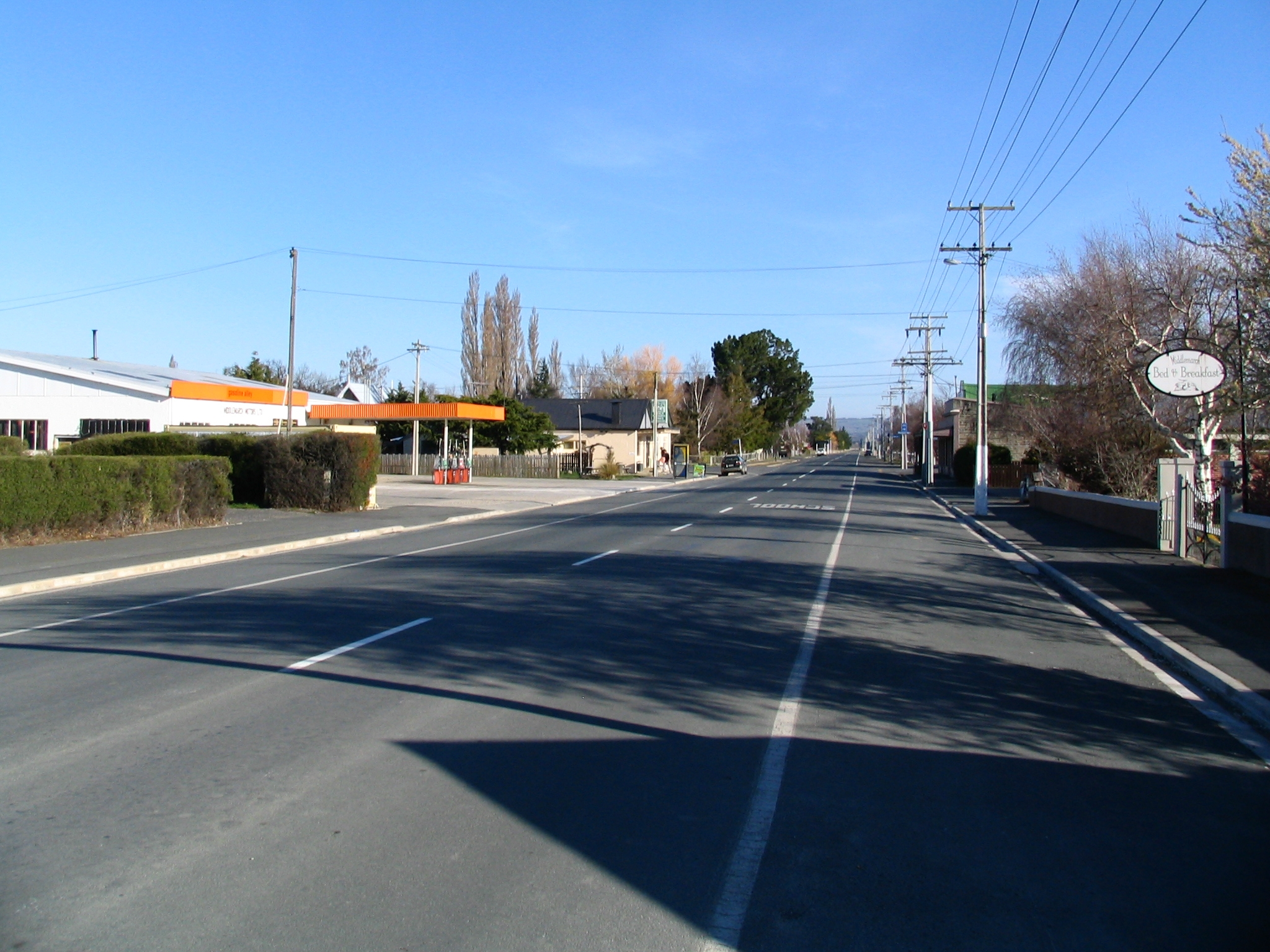
Looking south along State Highway 87 at Middlemarch

== See also ==
- List of New Zealand state highways
