= Gimmerburn =

- Settlement
- Location within New Zealand
- Coordinates: 45.163°S 169.997°E
- Country: New Zealand
- Region: Otago
- Territorial authority: Central Otago
- Time zone: UTC+12 (NZST)
  - Summer (DST): UTC+13 (NZDT)
- Local iwi: Ngāi Tahu

Gimmerburn is a farming community on the Maniototo Plain in the Otago region of New Zealand.

It is situated 11 km southwest of Ranfurly and largely consists of sheep and dairy farms with the focal point of the community being the Gimmerburn Domain, a sporting and recreational complex.

== History ==
Gimmerburn was originally surveyed by John Turnbull Thomson who named the area, and is part of the "Thomson's Barnyard", a group of localities named for farm animals.

Gimmerburn was principally sheep country until the development of the Maniototo Irrigation Scheme. Following the opening of the irrigation scheme in 1984, farms were able to sustain large dairy farm cattle herds.

At its peak, Gimmerburn had its own post office and school, the latter being formed in 1882 with classes being held in a shepherds hut.
