= Danseys Pass =

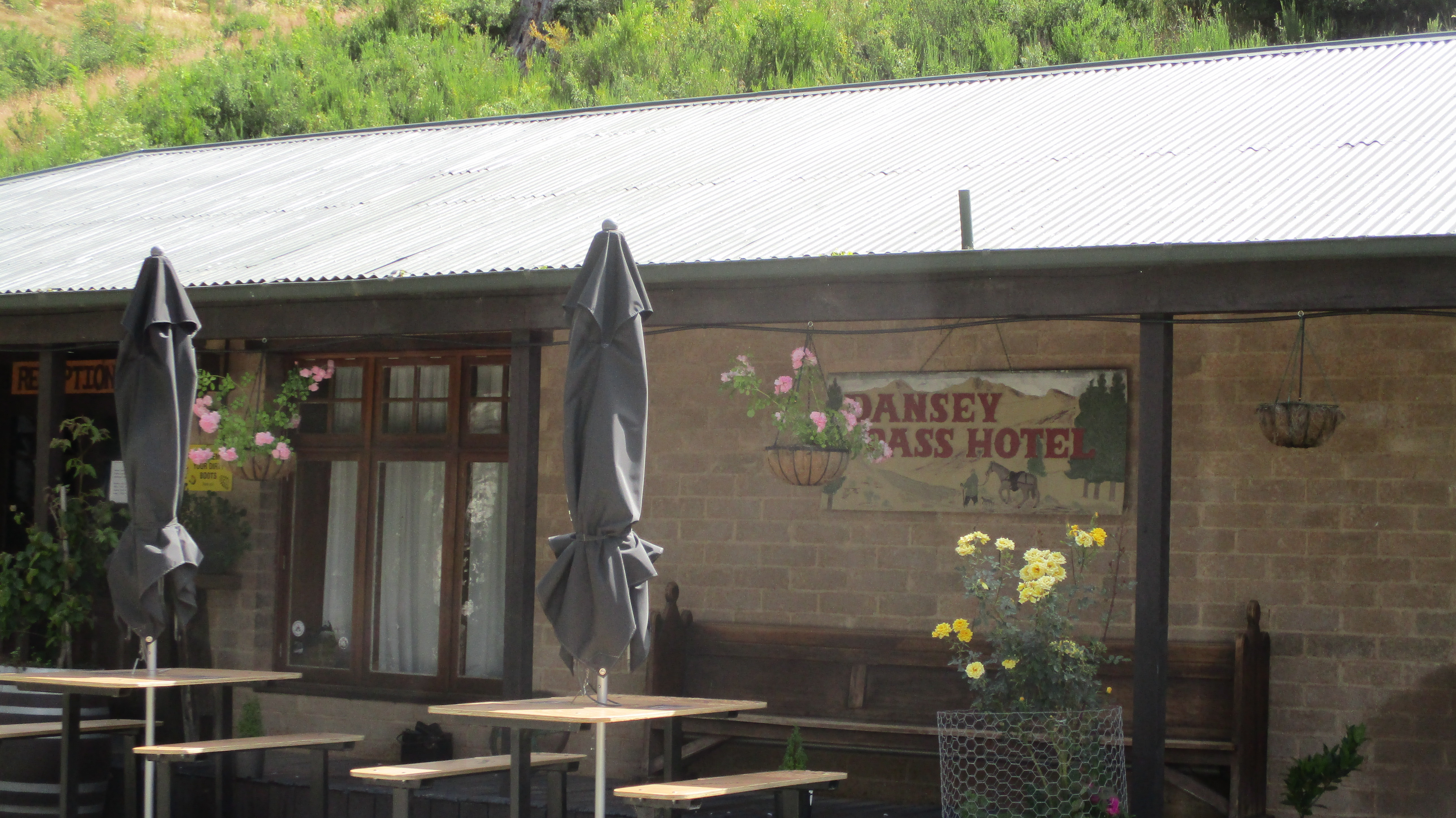
- Danseys Pass Hotel

- Location within New Zealand
- Elevation: 935 metres (3,068 ft)

Third Approach
- Location: New Zealand
- Range: Kakanui Range
- Coordinates: 44°57′12″S 170°22′24″E

Danseys Pass (often incorrectly referred to as Dansey's Pass or Dansey Pass) (el. 935 m.) is a mountain pass located in the Kakanui Range in the South Island of New Zealand.

The pass itself marks the boundary between Waitaki and Central Otago districts. It also serves as the boundary between the Canterbury and Otago regions. The road lies between the Maniototo plain (part of the Taieri River water catchment) and the northern foothills of the Kakanui Mountains (part of the Waitaki River catchment). Much of the road going over Danseys Pass is unsealed and is occasionally cut directly from the Haast Schist bedrock. The road was constructed for the owners of large sheep runs, the brothers Allan McLean and John McLean.

Although it is not a major arterial road, the pass is a fairly well-used link between the towns of Naseby and Ranfurly in the south and Duntroon, in North Otago. If State Highway 1 between Hampden and Moeraki is closed, it is the closest detour, despite adding over 100 kilometres (62 mi) to the journey.

The locality of Danseys Pass is situated approximately halfway between the pass and Duntroon on the eastern side, within the Waitaki District. The historic Danseys Pass Coach Inn/Danseys Pass Hotel is located on the western side within the Central Otago District, in the locality known as Kyeburn Diggings or Upper Kyeburn, north of Kyeburn.

The pass and road are named after William Heywood Dansey, who was the lessee of the Otekaike run from 1857 to 1871. In 1855, he, along with three companions, was the first European to cross the pass in search of land in the Maniototo district.
