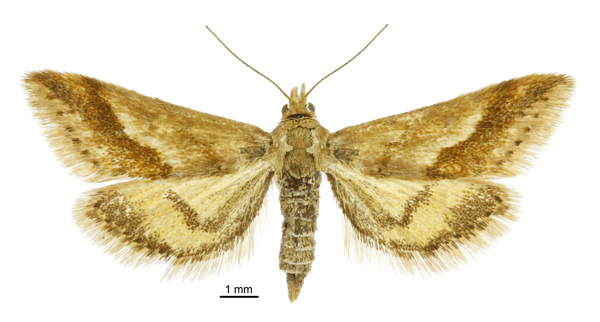
- Female
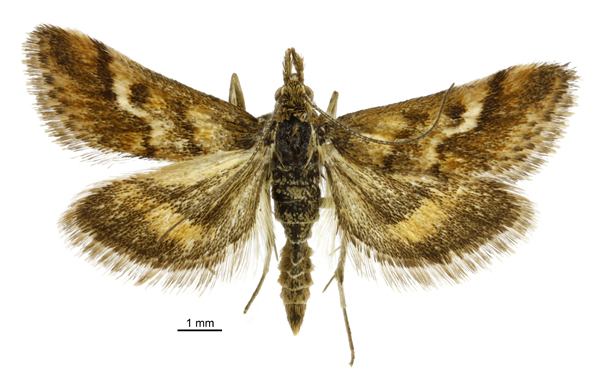
- Male

Conservation status
- Nationally Vulnerable (NZ TCS)

Scientific classification
- Kingdom: Animalia
- Phylum: Arthropoda
- Class: Insecta
- Order: Lepidoptera
- Family: Crambidae
- Genus: Pyrausta
- Species: P. comastis

Binomial name
- Pyrausta comastis (Meyrick, 1884)

Synonyms
- Proteroeca comastis Meyrick, 1884; Ennychia intrudens Warren, 1892; Loxostege comastis (Meyrick, 1884)

= Pyrausta comastis =

Species of moth

Pyrausta comastis is a moth in the family Crambidae. This species is endemic to New Zealand. It has been classified as "nationally vulnerable" by the Department of Conservation.

== Taxonomy ==
It was first described by Edward Meyrick in 1884 and given the name Proteroeca comastis. In 1892 William Warren also described the same species but thinking it new gave it the name Ennychia intrudens. This name was subsequently synonymised by Michael Shaffer. George Vernon Hudson also gave a description and illustration of the species under the name Proteroeca comastis in 1928. In 1988 John S. Dugdale listed the species under the genus Loxostege. However the correct binomial nomenclature for this species is Pyrausta comastis.

== Description ==
This species was described by Meyrick as follows:

♂︎,♀︎, 11 — 13 mm. Head, palpi, antennae, thorax, and abdomen brownish ochreous, more or less irrorated coarsely with blackish; palpi white beneath. Legs ochreous-whitish, anterior and middle tibiae irrorated with blackish above. Fore wings elongate-triangular, costa sinuate, slightly arched posteriorly, apex round-pointed, hind margin very obliquely rounded; ochreous-whitish, suffused with reddish ochreous except in disc; generally a dense blackish irroration (especially in male) forming a basal patch and broad fasciae following first and second lines, the last fascia separated from second line on costa by a pale spot; lines blackish, rather thick; first at one-third, slightly curved; second from three-fourths of costa to three-fifths of inner margin, sinuate inwards below middle; an irregular dark fuscous discal spot; cilia ochreous-whitish, base more ochreous, with two dark grey lines, first interrupted. Hind wings ochreous-orange, with some scattered black scales anteriorly; a blackish line beyond middle, sinuate inwards below costa, angulated below middle; a blackish hind-marginal band, very narrow on lower half, gradually dilated on upper half; cilia grey-whitish, basal half blackish.

== Distribution ==
P. comastis is endemic to New Zealand. It can be found in the South Island. Meyrick stated that the species could be found at Castle Hill and Christchurch. Hudson added to the locality list and included Lake Rotoiti, Wedderburn and New River, near Invercargill. Philpott collected the species at Red Lake in the Mount Cook district. It has also been collected in the Dansey ecological district in Otago. It is present at higher elevations.

== Life cycle and behaviour ==
This species life history is unknown. Adults have been recorded on wing in December and in January.

== Habitat ==
This species has been collected in dry grassy areas and damp open habitats.

== Conservation status ==
This moth is classified under the New Zealand Threat Classification system as being "nationally vulnerable".
