= Nova Zeelandia =

The Neo-Latin name Nova Zeelandia (Dutch: Nieuw Zeeland, lit. 'New Zeeland') honoured the Dutch coastal province of Zeeland ("sea-land"). Representatives of the Netherlands' colonial enterprises bestowed this name on:

- the Essequibo River colony, founded by Zeelanders in 1616 in present-day Guyana
- present-day New Zealand, visited by Abel Tasman in 1642–1643; later sometimes re-Latinised as Nova Zealandia or Nova Zelandia.

11
