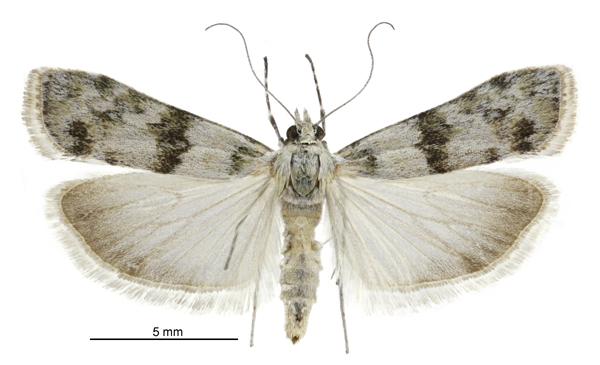
- Female
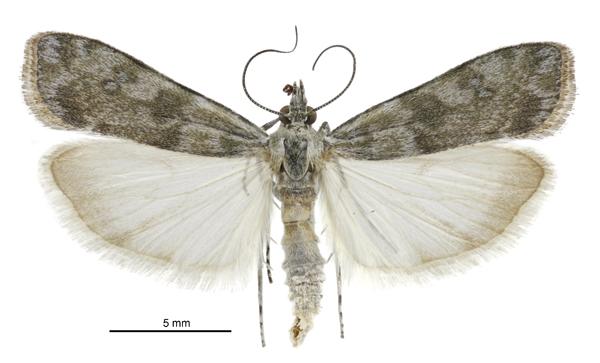
- Male

Scientific classification
- Kingdom: Animalia
- Phylum: Arthropoda
- Class: Insecta
- Order: Lepidoptera
- Family: Crambidae
- Genus: Eudonia
- Species: E. asaleuta

Binomial name
- Eudonia asaleuta (Meyrick, 1907)

Synonyms
- Scoparia asaleuta Meyrick, 1907

= Eudonia asaleuta =

Species of moth

Eudonia asaleuta is a moth of the family Crambidae. It was described by Edward Meyrick in 1907. It is endemic to New Zealand and has been collected in the South Island in the West Coast, Fiordland, Canterbury, Otago and Southland regions. This species inhabits bare shingle areas as well as tussock habitat with few trees or scrub at altitudes of under 1000 m. Adults are on the wing from November to February.

== Taxonomy ==
This species was first described by Edward Meyrick in 1907 using specimens collected at Lake Wakatipu by George Hudson and named Scoparia asaleuta. George Hudson discussed and illustrated this species in his book The butterflies and moths of New Zealand. In the 2010 the book The New Zealand Inventory of Biodiversity placed this species in the genus Eudonia. However some publications, subsequent to that book, continue to refer to this species as Scoparia asaleuta.

== Description ==
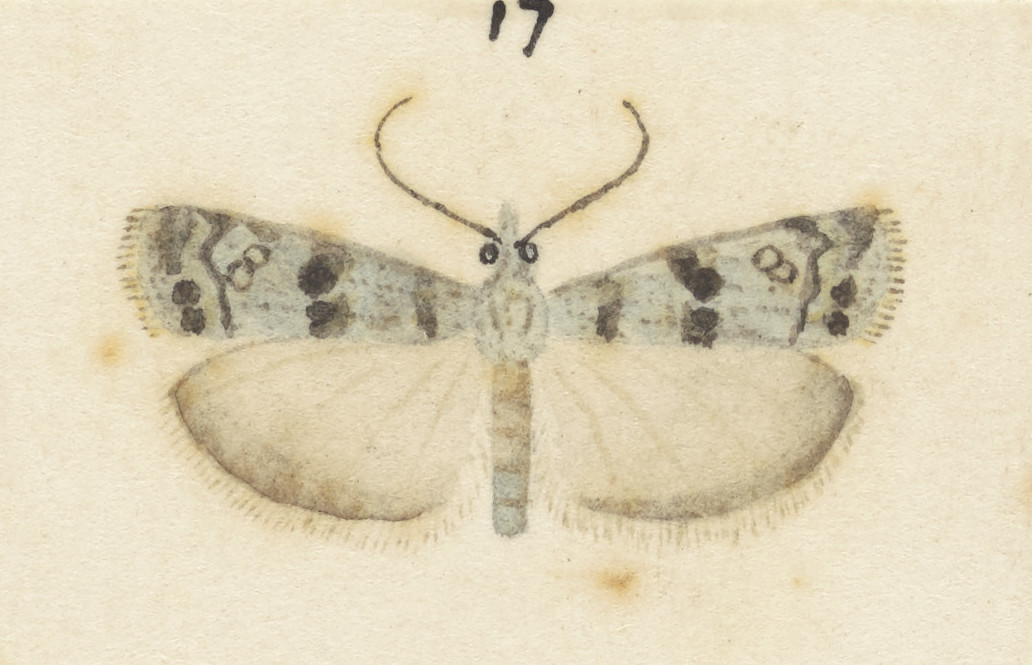
Illustration of female.

Meyrick described this species as follows:

♀. 21-23 mm. Head, palpi, and thorax prismatic bronzy- grey, suffusedly irrorated with white; palpi 2 1/4. Antennae dark grey, suffusedly ringed with white. Abdomen pale ochreous, sprinkled with grey. Forewings very elongate, narrow, posteriorly dilated, costa subsinuate in middle, slightly arched posteriorly, apex obtuse, termen nearly straight, hardly oblique, rounded beneath; iridescent pale ochreous mixed with dark bluish-grey, wholly suffused or densely irrorated with white except dark markings as under — viz., an undefined subbasal fascia; a nearly direct fascia representing first line, dilated posteriorly above middle; an 8-shaped discal mark; a broadt erminal fascia, on which the second and subterminal lines appear as whitish shades confluent in middle and sometimes partially obsolete : cilla whitish-ochreous, tips whitish, with narrow basal and broader postmedian grey shades. Hindwings without hairs in cell; pale greyish-ochreous, with suffused dark-grey terminal fascia; cilia ochreous-grey-whitish, with grey basal line.

This species has forewings that a coloured a bluish grey with a sheen that camouflages the moth against rocks.

== Distribution ==
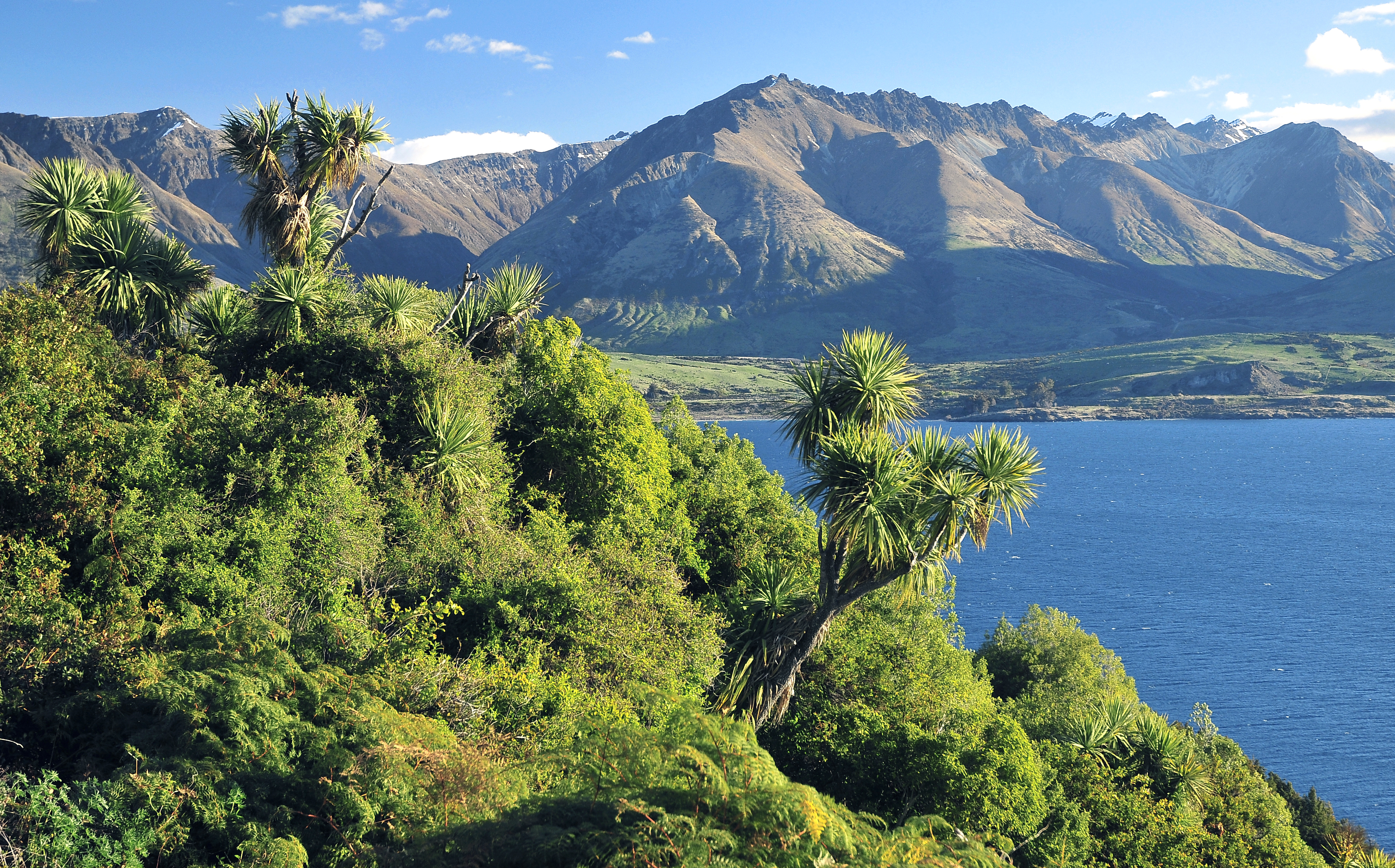
Type locality of Lake Wakatipu.

This species is endemic to New Zealand. It has been found in the West Coast, Fiordland, Canterbury, Otago and Southland. In particular it has been collected in Lake Wakatipu, Aoraki / Mount Cook, Waiho River bed, Lake Manapouri, Hope Arm in Fiordland, Danseys Pass, Makarora and Invercargill.

== Habitat ==
This species is known to inhabit open areas of bare shingle as well as tussock habitat with few trees or scrub at altitudes of under 1000 m.

== Behaviour ==
The adults of this species are on the wing from November to February but are more common in January and February. This species has been collected in light traps, Malaise traps, and pan traps.
