= Taumata o Kupe =

Building in Auckland, New Zealand

General information
- Location: 65/73 Premier Avenue, Point Chevalier, Auckland, Aotearoa New Zealand
- Opened: 12 November 2022

Design and construction
- Architect: TOA Architects
