= Sutton Salt Lake =

New Zealand's only inland salt water lake

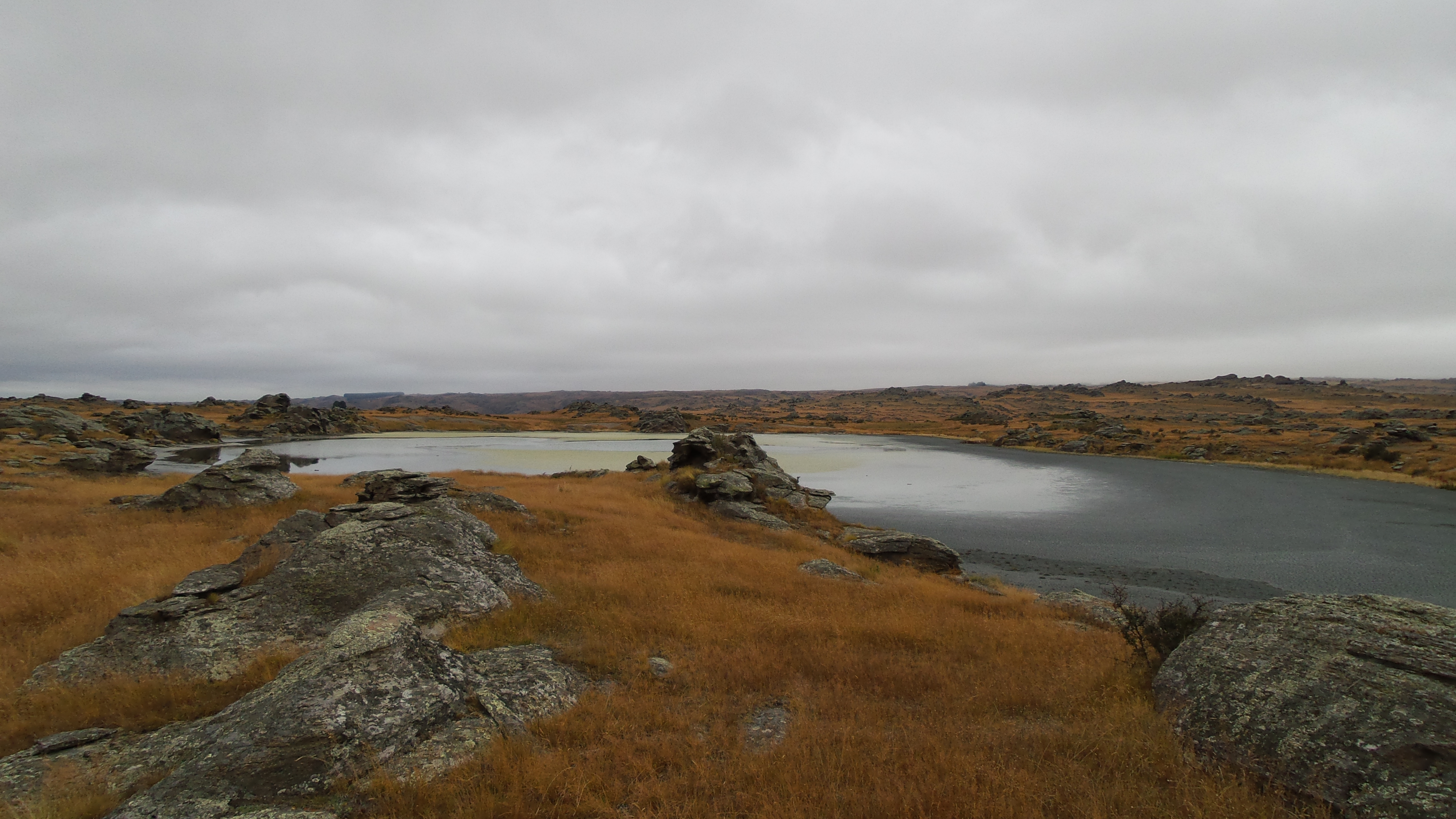
- Sutton Salt Lake

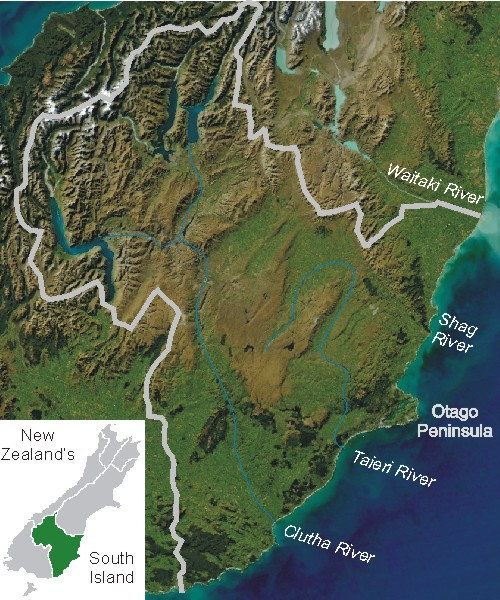
- Location within Otago peninsula
- Location: Otago, South Island
- Coordinates: 45°34′35″S 170°5′12″E
- Basin countries: New Zealand
- Max. depth: 0.5 m (1 ft 8 in)
- Surface elevation: 250 m (820 ft)

Sutton Salt Lake (also known as Salt Lake) in Otago, is New Zealand's only inland salt water lake. (Note: New Zealand also has one coastal salt water lake, Lake Grassmere, a lagoon with no direct outflow to the sea.)

== Geography ==
Sutton Salt Lake is located 10 kilometres (6.2 miles) west of Sutton, in the Strath Taieri, a valley surrounded by high hills. The hills to its north west are the Rock and Pillar Range, and south west the Lammermoor Range.

=== Geology ===
The lake is situated in schist basement and filled only by rainwater and dries up during periods of warm weather and little rain, in up to annual cycles. It has been doing this for about 20,000 years When full, the lake has salinity about one quarter to one third of that of seawater and a pH near 9. At other times it has salinity up to 50 mS/cm which is more than typical New Zealand oceanic waters. The salinity is due to marine aerosols in rainwater which has been concentrated by around 20000 evaporation and refilling cycles.

=== Climate ===
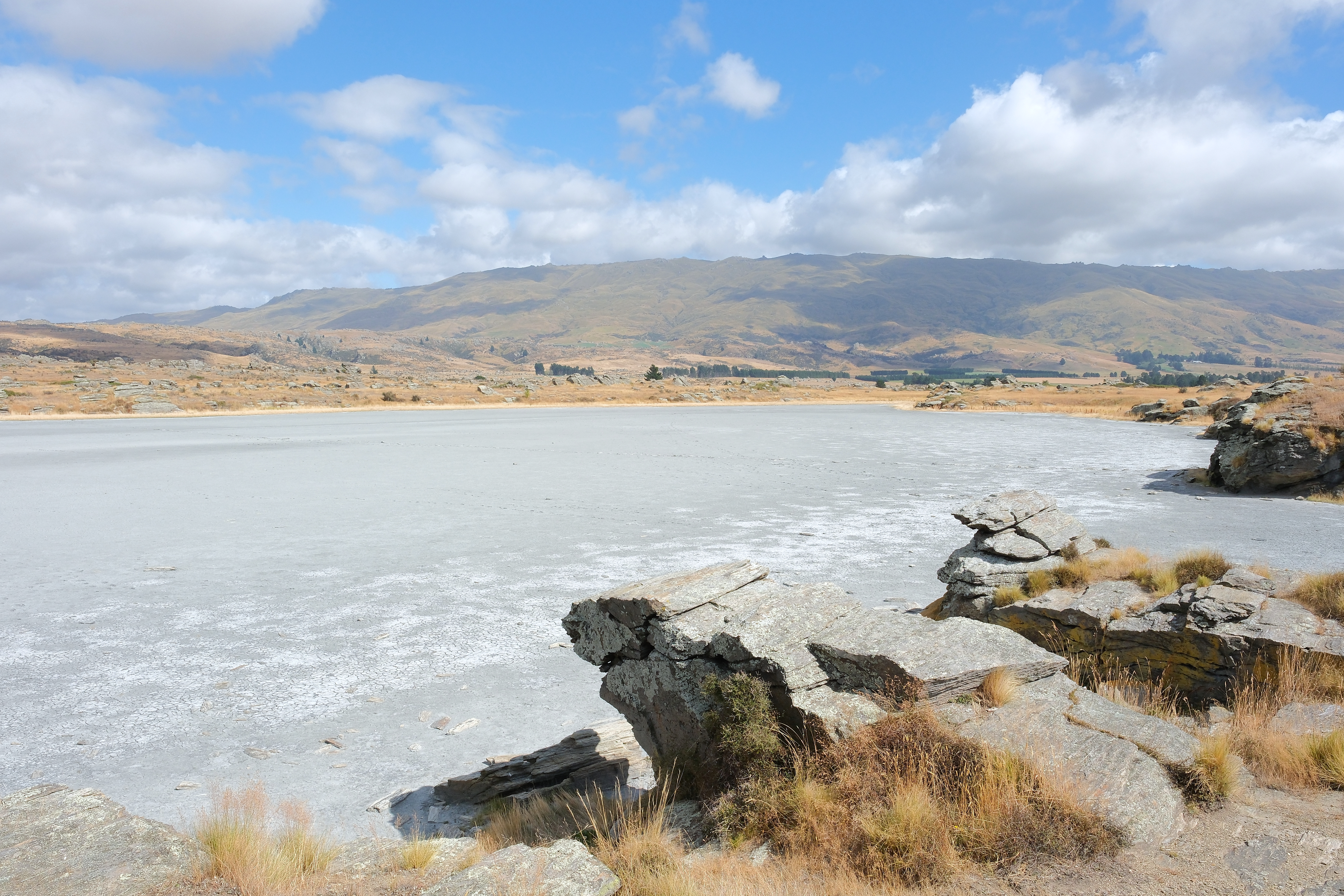
Sutton Salt Lake in a dry state.

Sutton Salt Lake is also unique in that it lies in a region of windy cool-temperate maritime climate. This makes it different from most of the world's saline lakes, which usually form in arid continental landscapes. The total area of the lake, when the shallow depression is filled with rainwater, is nearly two hectares. The nearest coast is 50 km (31 mi) from the lake, and separated from the lake by to its south an area of high ground known as the Barewood Plateau.

The area around Sutton Lake gets 500 mm (20 in) of rainfall annually, about half of that of the coast nearby. It like much of Central Otago is in the rain shadow of the Southern Alps. Coastal hills create a minor barrier to the rain, halving the amount of rainfall that the lake receives. Strong winds increase the lake's surface evaporation rate, which is around 700 mm (28 in)/year.

== Ecology ==
The lake site has surrounding halophytic vegetation. The margin flats around the lake have much lower salinity than the lake itself. The most abundant salt grasses are the native Puccinellia walkeri and the introduced Puccinellia fasciculata. Since 1984 exotic weeds have displaced the native salt-tolerant herb Selliera radicans invading the lower saline margins around the lake.
