= Sutton, New Zealand =

Locality in Dunedin City, Otago Region, New Zealand

Coordinates: 45°33′53″S 170°07′19″E

Sutton is a locality in the Strath Taieri, in the southern part of the South Island, New Zealand. It is located on SH 87 close to the point where it is met by the Taieri Gorge rail line, some 5 kilometres (3 mi) to the south of Middlemarch. New Zealand's only salt lake, the Sutton Salt Lake, lies 10 kilometres (6.2 mi) to the west. Sutton is the location of the Orchard Sun Club, Dunedin's only landed naturist club.
