= New Zealand place names =

Overview of place names in New Zealand

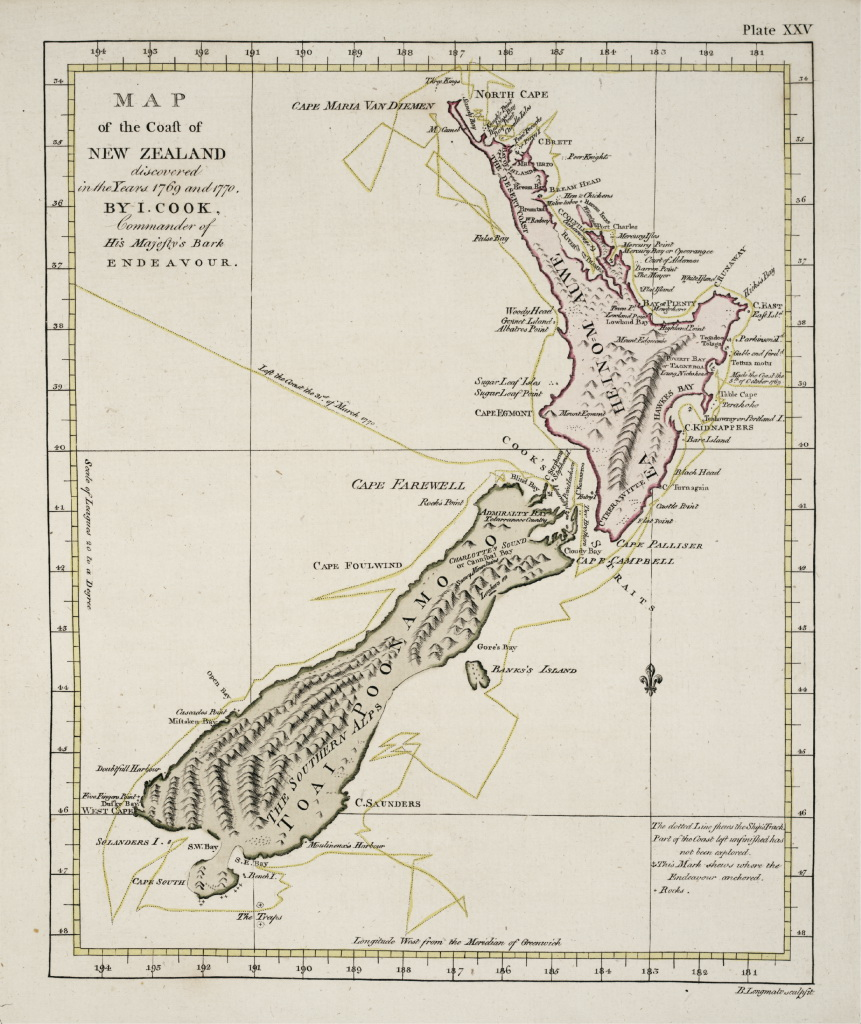
Captain James Cook's map of New Zealand has names that Cook bestowed and Māori names.

Most New Zealand place names have a Māori or a British origin. Both groups used names to commemorate notable people, events, places from their homeland, and their ships, or to describe the surrounding area. It is unknown whether Māori had a name for the whole of New Zealand before the arrival of Europeans, but post-colonisation the name Aotearoa (commonly translated as 'long white cloud') has been used to refer to the whole country. Dutch cartographers named the islands Nova Zeelandia, the Latin translation of the Dutch Nieuw Zeeland (after the Dutch province of Zeeland). By the time of British exploration, the country's name was anglicised to New Zealand.

Many of the early Māori names were replaced by Europeans during the late 18th and early 19th centuries. Legislation in 1894 and the establishment of the New Zealand Geographic Board in 1946 led to the encouragement of original Māori names, although differing spellings and anglicised pronunciations persisted. Many names now have alternative or dual English and Māori names or, in a few rare cases, dual Māori names or dual English names. Most names have never been made official, but if they are mentioned in authoritative publications they are considered recorded names. Colloquial names in New Zealand result from an ironic view of the place's entertainment value, or plays on advertising mottos, or are shortened versions of the full name. Some places tried to capitalise on the success of The Lord of the Rings films by linking themselves to the movies.

== Country and main islands ==
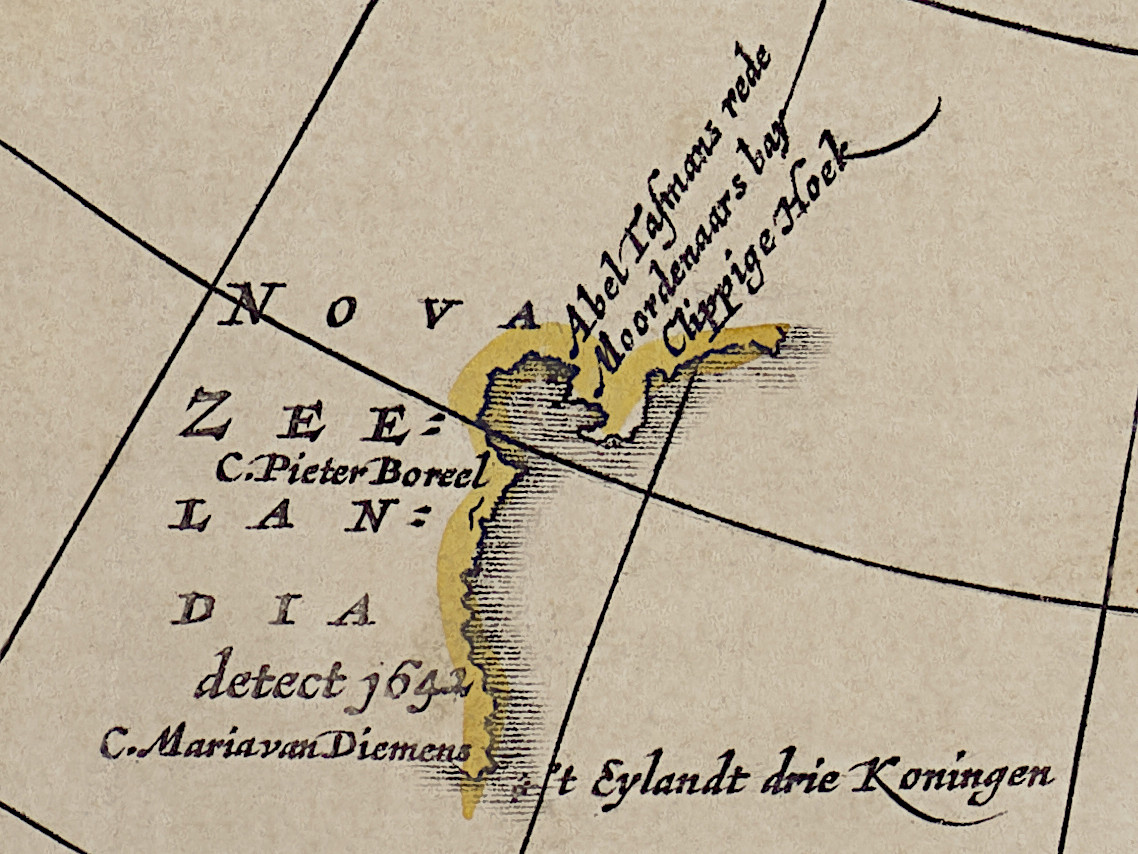
Dutch map of 1666 showing western coastline of "Nova Zeelandia"

There is no known pre-contact Māori name for New Zealand as a whole, but Māori had several names for the North and South Islands, including Te Ika-a-Māui (the fish of Māui) for the North Island and Te Waipounamu (the waters of greenstone) and Te Waka o Aoraki (the canoe of Aoraki) for the South Island. Until the early 20th century, Māori also referred to the North Island as Aotearoa (commonly translated as 'long white cloud'); in modern Māori usage this has become the name for the whole country.

Dutch explorer Abel Tasman was the first European to sight New Zealand, in 1642. He named it Staten Land "in honour of the States General" (Dutch parliament). He wrote, "it is possible that this land joins to the Staten Land but it is uncertain", referring to a landmass of the same name at the southern tip of South America, discovered by Jacob Le Maire in 1616. Hendrik Brouwer proved that the South American land was an island in 1643, and Dutch cartographers subsequently renamed Tasman's discovery Nova Zeelandia, from Latin, after the Dutch province of Zeeland. Nova Zeelandia later became Nieuw Zeeland in Dutch. It is unknown when this was anglicised to New Zealand, but when British explorer James Cook left on his first voyage of discovery in 1768, the sealed orders given to him by the British Admiralty ordered him to proceed "...to the Westward between the Latitude beforementioned and the Latitude of 35° until' you discover it, or fall in with the Eastern side of the Land discover'd by Tasman and now called New Zeland."

The 1840 Letters Patent established New Zealand as a British colony and claimed the "principal islands" of New Zealand, identified by their commonly known names at the time: the Northern Island (the North Island), the Middle Island (the South Island) and Stewart's Island or "South Island". The letters patent attempted to rename the islands New Ulster, New Munster and New Leinster after the provinces in Ireland. New Ulster, New Munster and New Leinster were also used for the initial provinces of New Zealand, but the names did not endure. In the 1830s the South Island was used as an alternative to Middle Island and by 1907 it became the common name. The North and South Island names arose through common usage rather than official declaration and in 2009 it was revealed that they had never been formalised.

In 2013, alternative names were formalised for the two main islands, as North Island or Te Ika-a-Māui, and South Island or Te Waipounamu, with either English or Māori name being used or a combination of both.

== Māori names ==
Words that are commonly used in Māori place names:
ara	path or road
awa	river
hau	wind
manga	stream
maunga	mountain
moana	sea or ocean
motu	island
nui	big
ō	the place of
one	mud, sand or beach
puke	hill
roto	lake
wai	water
whanga	bay

Many Māori place names possess either historical or mythological significance. Their meaning is not always apparent from literal translations, but some interpretations have passed down through oral tradition. Before the arrivals of Europeans, place names often commemorated notable or historical incidents, described features of the location or derived from traditional Hawaiki names or myths.

Early Māori explorers such as Kupe, Ngahue, and Toi named many of New Zealand's coastal features. Like later European explorers, they named things after themselves, their family members and events that occurred at the newly discovered locations. Kahumatamomoe named Manukau Harbour after a manuka stake that he used to claim ownership of the area, and Kaipara Harbour after the para fern he ate there (kai means "food" or "to eat"). The Māori name for Wellington Harbour, Te Whanganui a Tara (the great harbour of Tara), derives from Tara, a grandson of Kupe and ancestor of several local iwi. Names from other islands visited during the Polynesian migrations have become attached to some New Zealand landmarks, for example Raratoka Island (from Rarotonga) and Tawhiti (from Tahiti). Whakatāne, Rangitoto Island, Taupō, Urewera, Ngongotahā, and Tikitapu all commemorate incidents that occurred during the early arrivals, many of which are now forgotten.

Maketu and Mount Moehau are two of the few remaining names connected to places in Hawaiki. Descriptive words often occur as part of a place name. Whanganui means "wide river-mouth" and Waikanae indicates good waters for catching kanae, or flathead mullet.

European arrivals exposed Māori to Christianity, leading to the settlements of Hiruharama, Petane and Hamaria – named after the biblical Jerusalem, Bethany and Samaria respectively. The names of the Rānana, Ātene and Kareponia settlements represent Māori-language approximations of London, Athens and California.

Moriori, descendants of Māori, migrated to the Chatham Islands (off the eastern coasts of mainland New Zealand) c. 1500 CE and named them Rēkohu (Misty Sun). Sometime before 1835 mainland Māori settled at Rēkohu and confused the name of the settlement, Wharekauri, with the name of the main island. It has been known as Wharekauri to Māori ever since.

=== Post-colonial recognition ===
The Royal Geographical Society of London originally had legal responsibility for New Zealand place names. The Designations of Districts Act 1894 transferred the authority to the governor of New Zealand. The act included a provision from Joseph Ward that gave preference to the original Māori names for any new or altered names. It also allowed for misspelt or corrupted Māori names to be changed to correct Māori (although this did not always occur). In 1924 the Honorary Geographic Board of New Zealand was set up by the government to advise on place names. The New Zealand Geographic Board Act 1946 repealed the Designations of Districts Act and established the New Zealand Geographic Board (NZGB), giving it the power to assign and change place names. Anyone can propose a geographical name to the Board, which consults local Māori and allows public submissions before determining if a name should be made official. Names can also be made official through an Act of Parliament. The NZGB is required to keep a public list of all the official New Zealand geographical names.

The NZGB prefers Māori place names and looks to restore the original Māori name if it has altered over time. If both the Māori and non-Maori names are considered equally significant a place may be given dual or alternative names. The board prefers places to have single names and aims to use just the Māori name eventually. Alternative names are where either name can be used officially (for example, "North Island" and "Te Ika-a-Māui"). Dual names are where both names should be used together (e.g. "Matiu / Somes Island"). In 1998, as a result of the settling of the Ngāi Tahu Treaty claim, New Zealand's tallest mountain officially became "Aoraki / Mount Cook". There are also a few English dual names, with Wellington Harbour also officially known as Port Nicholson.

Māori groups have campaigned to correct Māori place names that are spelled or pronounced inaccurately. In 2000 the Geographic Board declined a local iwi suggestion to rename the Wellington suburb of Hataitai to Whataitai (the name of a taniwha (sea-monster), which legend says lived in Wellington Harbour). In 2009 the NZGB recommended renaming the city of Wanganui to Whanganui, as the town was originally named after the Whanganui River and the word wanga is not in the Māori lexicon. The government decided later in 2009 to accept both "Whanganui" and "Wanganui" as alternative official names. The spelling "Wanganui" may have originated to reflect the dialectal pronunciation of local Māori, who pronounce 'wh' (an "f"-like sound in other dialects) as [ˀw] – a glottalised "w".

== European names ==
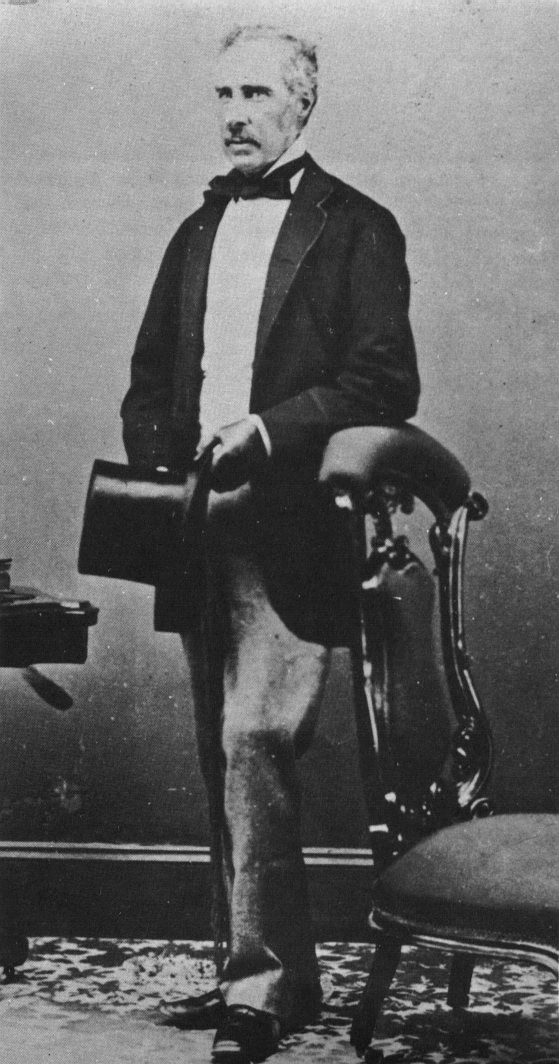
The Grey River, Mount Grey, Greytown, Greymouth and Grey Lynn all derive their name from Sir George Grey.

Tasman named a few geographic features as he sailed along New Zealand's west coast. Ones such as Cape Maria van Diemen (named after the wife of the governor of Batavia) and Three Kings Islands are still in use, while Murderers Bay did not last. Cook named many more on his voyage, including Bay of Plenty, Bay of Islands, Poverty Bay, Cape Farewell, Queen Charlotte Sound, Mount Egmont and Banks Peninsula. Cape Kidnappers commemorates a Māori attempt to kidnap one of Cook's crew members. Jules Dumont d'Urville named French Pass after sailing through it. The explorers lent their names to many places, including Mount Tasman, Tasman Glacier, the Tasman region, Cook Strait, Mount Cook and d'Urville Island. The Coromandel, Chatham and Pegasus ships visited New Zealand's shores between 1791 and 1820 and were used to name Coromandel Peninsula, Chatham Islands, Pegasus Bay and Port Pegasus. Stewart Island was named after the first officer aboard the Pegasus.

Most European names came during the 1840s to 1910s and were given by surveyors who worked for colonising associations or provincial governments. Names acknowledged the colonising associations sponsors (Hutt Valley, Wakefield, Port Chalmers, Ashburton), ships (Bombay), government officials (Featherston, Rolleston, Invercargill), politicians (Foxton, Fox Glacier, Gisborne) and church leaders (Selwyn). Military heroes and famous battles were popular place names, with Auckland, Napier, Hastings, Havelock, Wellington, Picton, Marlborough, Nelson and Blenheim. British politicians and royalty lent their names to Russell, Palmerston, Cromwell, Queenstown and Alexandra, while Franz Josef is named after the Austrian emperor. Royal names are more popular for streets than towns or geographical features, although both Auckland and Wellington have Mount Victoria. Gore is named after governor Thomas Gore Browne and George Grey's name is used for Greytown, Greymouth, Grey Lynn and many natural features. Relatively few names are derived from British towns, with Dunedin (after Edinburgh—Dùn Éideann in Scottish Gaelic), New Plymouth and the Canterbury Province among the most notable.

Many inland locations (including Helensville, Dargaville, Morrinsville, Bulls, Masterton and Levin) were named after the early settlers. The Mackenzie Country takes its name from a sheep stealer and King Country references the region where the Māori king defied colonial government for many years. Mountains and passes were named after their discoverers (Haast, Lewis) or scientists (Newton, Lyell). Other names were descriptive, such as Woodville, Island Bay, Riverton, Whitecliffs and Bluff. A few derive their names from descriptions in languages other than English or Māori, for example: Miramar, which means "sea view" in Spanish; and Inchbonnie, which means "beautiful" (bonnie in Lallands) "island" (innis in Scottish Gaelic).

Many Scottish names occur in Otago and Southland (the Lammerlaws, Invercargill, Wedderburn, Glenfalloch) and Scottish settlers also named Riccarton and the Avon River in Christchurch. Canterbury has an English flavour to its nomenclature with Christchurch and Oxford, but also contains Belfast and French names throughout the Akaroa area. Scandinavian migrants left their mark in the Seventy Mile Bush with Dannevirke and Norsewood and some of the suburbs and streets of Auckland and Wellington reflect Australian immigration (Footscray and Botany Downs). There is very little Asian influence in New Zealand place naming, with Khandallah in Wellington and Cashmere (Kashmir) in Christchurch reflecting British imperial connections rather than Indian influence.

== Unofficial names ==
Many of New Zealand's place names have never been officially approved by the NZGB. They either fall outside the board's jurisdiction (homesteads, lighthouses) or were common names before the board was established and have never been officially formalised. Unofficial recorded names are defined as "names that have appeared in at least two publicly available authoritative publications or databases". Such recorded names include those of major cities (Wellington, Auckland, Hamilton, Christchurch), mountains (Mount Tasman, Mount Dampier), islands (Auckland Islands, Great Barrier Island) and many other geographical features. (Note: Recorded names were obtained by comparing names found in the New Zealand Place Names Database but not recorded in the New Zealand Gazetteer of Official Geographic Names.)

The New Zealand archipelago and various parts of it have acquired a range of colloquial names over the years. Unofficial late 19th-century names for New Zealand included "Maoriland" and "God's Own Country". "Maoriland" occurred widely in the labour movement, and a labour newspaper named the Maoriland Worker appeared from 1910 to the 1930s. Premier Richard John Seddon (in power 1893–1906) popularised "God's Own Country". Both names fell out of popularity in the course of the 20th century, although "God's Own Country" (or "Godzone") still occasionally appears. Latinate names for the country have included Zealandia and Nova Zealandia.

Many cities and towns have nicknames based on a prominent feature or one which promoters wish to emphasise. Christchurch is promoted as the "Garden City" and Auckland is commonly referred to as the "city of sails". Hamilton acquired the nickname "the Tron" after "Hamiltron: City of the Future" was suggested for a city slogan. Wellington is known as the "windy city" due to its strong and unpredictable winds.

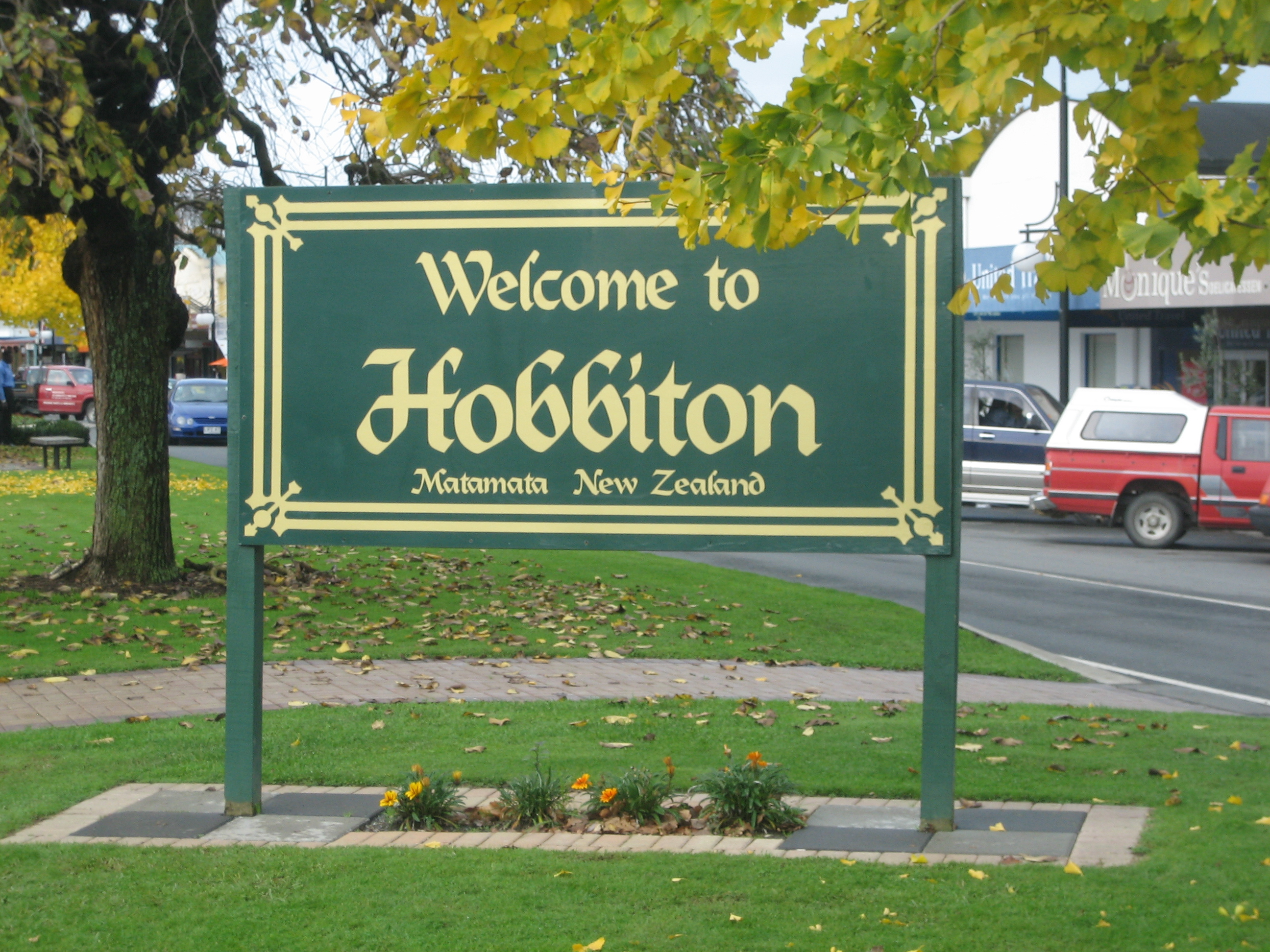
Matamata's 'Welcome to Hobbiton' sign

Following the release of Peter Jackson's The Lord of the Rings films, New Zealand has sometimes been called "Middle-earth" (after the fictional setting of the films). Wellington, the centre of the films' production, was sometimes called "The Middle of Middle-earth", and for about a week around the release of the first movie the local newspaper The Evening Post renamed itself as The Middle Earth Post. The town of Matamata, near the location of many of the films' Hobbiton scenes, unofficially renamed itself "Hobbiton". The flourishing of the film-industry in Wellington has led to the nickname "Wellywood", but a proposal to erect a "Hollywood"-style sign near the airport failed due to public resistance and possible copyright infringements.

A number of communities have acquired ironic nicknames associating them with the "more exciting" city of Las Vegas; "Rotovegas" for Rotorua, "Ashvegas" for Ashburton, "Invervegas" for Invercargill and "Stokes Vegas" for Stokes Valley. Other areas have nicknames or popular designations based on abbreviations or on mangling their Māori name. New Zealanders will sometimes refer to the Taranaki Region as "The Naki", Palmerston North as "Palmy", Gisborne as "Gizzie", Cardrona as "Cardie", Paraparaumu as "Paraparam", Waimakariri as "Waimak" and Paekākāriki as "Pie-cock". Wainuiomata can become "the Nui".

Waikikamukau (/waɪkɪkɑːmuːkaʊ/, as if saying "Why kick a moo-cow") is a generic (and somewhat disparaging) name for a small rural and entirely fictional town or locality in New Zealand.

== See also ==
- List of New Zealand place name etymologies
- Locations in New Zealand with a Scottish name
- Taumatawhakatangihangakoauauotamateaturipukakapikimaungahoronukupokaiwhenuakitanatahu

== Notes and references ==
=== Bibliography ===
- Hay, Jennifer; Maclagan, Margaret; Gordon, Elizabeth (2008). Dialects of English: New Zealand English. Edinburgh University Press. ISBN 978-0-7486-2529-1.
- King, Michael (2003). The Penguin History of New Zealand. Auckland: Penguin Books. ISBN 978-0-14-301867-4.
- Mein Smith, Philippa (2005). A Concise History of New Zealand. Cambridge University Press. ISBN 0-521-54228-6.
