= Kyeburn =

Small settlement in New Zealand

Coordinates: 45°8′48″S 170°15′24″E

Kyeburn is a small settlement in Otago, in the South Island of New Zealand. It lies on the Maniototo, a wide, high plain stretching from the end of the Strath-Taieri valley.

Kyeburn stands at the junction of State Highways 85 ("The Pigroot") and 87, some 15 kilometres (9.3 mi) east of Ranfurly, on the Kyeburn Stream, a minor tributary of the Taieri River. The stream's name, from which the settlement gets its name, is one of those within "Thomson's Barnyard", an area dotted with northern English farmyard animal names, all given by early Otago surveyor John Turnbull Thomson. The area was, in its early years of settlement, called Cows Creek. ("kye" is a Northumbrian term for cows).

The area around Kyeburn was a busy mining location during the latter part of the Otago gold rush, with the mining settlement of Kyeburn Diggings (sometimes called Upper Kyeburn) located some 10 kilometres to the north of Kyeburn itself.

== The Murder of Mary Young ==
Kyeburn would be flung into national and international infamy at the beginning of the 1880s when long-time resident Mary Young was murdered on 3 August 1880. This murder was shocking to many residents and garnered media attention during the trial that followed. Young died from the injuries that were inflicted on her with large stones from her garden before any definite culprit could be found. Because of this, the police struggled to find a motive, let alone the identity of the culprit. The only lead they had initially was discovered through talking to Young before she died, as she indicated that the person that attacked her was of Chinese origin. Despite the lack of evidence, a lengthy trial would find a Chinese man by the name of Ah Lee guilty. He was a miner who had only been in the area for a short period of time and was indicted based on largely circumstantial evidence. Although he was convicted and executed, a lot of people believed that Lee was not guilty, after many fallacies in the prosecution came to light, including the fact that the interpreter who the police used did not fully understand the type of Chinese. The interpreter was a Seyuip Cantonese and Lee of Panyu origin, resulting in about a 40% understanding between the two.

== Fossil moa trackway ==
In March 2019, a series of seven moa footprints were discovered in the Kyeburn River by Michael Johnston, a local tractor-driver. This was the first fossilised trackway known from the South Island; all previous finds were made in the North Island. Johnston alerted curator Kane Fleury at Tūhura Otago Museum in Dunedin to the discovery. The river was diverted, and the footprints were removed to the museum. Study of the footprints published in 2023 revealed they were around 3.6 million years old, the second-oldest evidence of moa in New Zealand. They were likely made by a relative of the heavy-footed moa around 1,095 mm (43.1 in) tall at the hip and weighing around 85 kg (187 lb), walking at 2.6 km/h (1.6 mph). A single, faint footprint was made by a giant moa with an estimated weight of 158 kg (348 lb).
