= Danseys Pass (locality) =

Coordinates: 44°56′43.36″S 170°34′11.37″E

Danseys Pass is a locality in Waitaki District in the Canterbury region of New Zealand. The settlement is located approximately halfway between Danseys Pass (the mountain pass of the same name) and Duntroon on the Canterbury side of the pass. The pass and road (and thus the locality) are named after William Heywood Dansey. He was the lessee of the Otekaike run from 1857 to 1871 who, in 1855 with three companions, was the first European to cross the pass in search for land in the Maniototo district.
