= State Highway 86 (New Zealand) =

Road in New Zealand

State Highway 86

Route information
- Maintained by NZ Transport Agency Waka Kotahi
- Length: 6 km (3.7 mi)

Major junctions
- East end: SH 1 (Allanton-Waihola Road/East Taieri-Allanton Road) at Allanton
- West end: Dunedin Airport, Momona

Location
- Country: New Zealand

Highway system
- New Zealand state highways; Motorways and expressways; List
| ← SH 85 | → SH 87 |

State Highway 86 (SH 86) is a New Zealand state highway connecting the city of Dunedin's airport to State Highway 1 and the city itself. It was gazetted in 2003. It is a two-lane single carriageway.

== Route ==
The road begins at an intersection with SH 1 in the satellite town of Allanton and proceeds in a north-northwesterly direction over the Taieri Plains. After about 1.5 km the road curves to the west-southwest and proceeds for about 3.5 km before veering to the NNW and then to the SSW again at Momona before terminating at Dunedin airport.

== See also ==
- List of New Zealand state highways
