= Aotearoa =

Māori name for New Zealand

Aotearoa (Note: English: /ˌɑːətæeəˈroːə/, /ˌæətiːəˈrɑʉə/; Māori pronunciation: [aɔˈtɛaɾɔa]) is the Māori-language name for New Zealand. The name was originally used by Māori in reference only to the North Island, with the whole country sometimes referred to as Aotearoa me Te Waipounamu, especially in the South Island. In the pre-European era, Māori did not have a collective name for the two islands.

Several meanings for Aotearoa have been proposed; the most popular translation usually given is 'land of the long white cloud', or variations thereof. This refers to the cloud formations which are believed to have helped early Polynesian navigators find the country in Māori oral tradition.

Beginning in the late 20th century, Aotearoa has become widespread in the bilingual naming of national organisations and institutions. Since the 1990s, it has been customary for particular parties to sing the New Zealand national anthem, "God Defend New Zealand" (or "Aotearoa"), in both Māori and English, which further exposed the name to a wider audience.

New Zealand English speakers pronounce the word with various degrees of approximation to the original Māori pronunciation, from /ˌɑːəteɪəˈrɔːə/ [ˌɐːɘtæeɘˈɹoːɘ] at one end of the spectrum (nativist) to /ˌeɪətiːəˈroʊə/ [ˌæeɘtiːɘˈɹɐʉɘ] at the other. Pronunciations documented in dictionaries of English include /ˌeɪəteɪəˈroʊə/, /aʊˌteɪəˈroʊə/, and /ˌɑːoʊtiːəˈroʊə/.

== Origin ==
The original meaning of Aotearoa is not known. The word can be broken up as: ao ('cloud', 'dawn', 'daytime' or 'world'), tea ('white', 'clear' or 'bright') and roa ('long'). It can also be broken up as Aotea, the name of one of the migratory canoes that travelled to New Zealand, and roa ('long'). The most common literal translation is 'long white cloud', commonly lengthened to 'the land of the long white cloud'. Alternative translations include 'long bright world' or 'land of abiding day', possibly referring to New Zealand having longer summer days in comparison to those further north in the Pacific Ocean.

=== Mythology ===
In some traditional stories, Aotearoa was the name of the canoe (waka) of the explorer Kupe, and he named the land after it. Kupe's wife Kuramārōtini (in some versions, his daughter) was watching the horizon and called "He ao! He ao!" ('a cloud! a cloud!'). Other versions say the canoe was guided by a long white cloud in the course of the day and by a long bright cloud at night. On arrival, the sign of land to Kupe's crew was the long cloud hanging over it. The cloud caught Kupe's attention and he said "Surely is a point of land". Due to the cloud which greeted them, Kupe named the land Aotearoa.

== Usage ==
It is not known when Māori began incorporating the name into their oral lore. Beginning in 1845, George Grey, Governor of New Zealand, spent some years amassing information from Māori regarding their legends and histories. He translated it into English, and in 1855 published a book called Polynesian Mythology and Ancient Traditional History of the New Zealand Race. In a reference to Māui, the culture hero, Grey's translation from the Māori reads as follows:

Thus died this Maui we have spoken of; but before he died he had children, and sons were born to him; some of his descendants yet live in Hawaiki, some in Aotearoa (or in these islands); the greater part of his descendants remained in Hawaiki, but a few of them came here to Aotearoa.

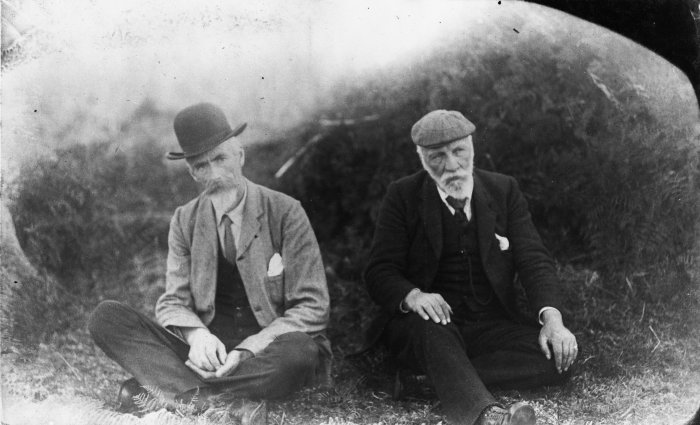
Elsdon Best and Stephenson Percy Smith of the Polynesian Society, who did much to popularise the use of Aotearoa in Edwardian school books, pictured in 1908

The use of Aotearoa to refer to the whole country is a post-colonial custom. Before the period of contact with Europeans, Māori did not have a commonly used name for the entire New Zealand archipelago. As late as the 1960s the name was used in reference to the North Island (Te Ika-a-Māui) only; an example of this usage appeared in Te Ao Hou, a bilingual newspaper published in July 1969. It contained the phrase, "ko Niu Tīreni, nei, arā, ko Aotearoa, Te Waipounamu me Wharekauri kotahi rau mā toru mano koēa māero (103,000 sq. miles)", meaning "New Zealand, that is, the North Island, South Island and Chatham Island, make up together 103,000 sq. miles", and occasional usage has continued until at least 2005.

After the adoption of the name New Zealand (anglicised from Nova Zeelandia) by Europeans, one name used by Māori to denote the country as a whole was Niu Tīreni, (Note: The spelling varies, for example, the variant Nu Tirani appears in the Māori version of the Declaration of Independence of New Zealand and the Treaty of Waitangi. Whatever the spelling, this name is now rarely used as Māori no longer favour the use of transliterations from English.) a respelling of New Zealand derived from an approximate pronunciation.

The expanded meaning of Aotearoa among Pākehā became commonplace in the late 19th century. Aotearoa was used for the name of New Zealand in the 1878 translation of "God Defend New Zealand", by Judge Thomas Henry Smith of the Native Land Court—this translation is widely used today when the anthem is sung in Māori. Additionally, William Pember Reeves used Aotearoa to mean New Zealand in his history of the country published in 1898, The Long White Cloud: Ao Tea Roa.

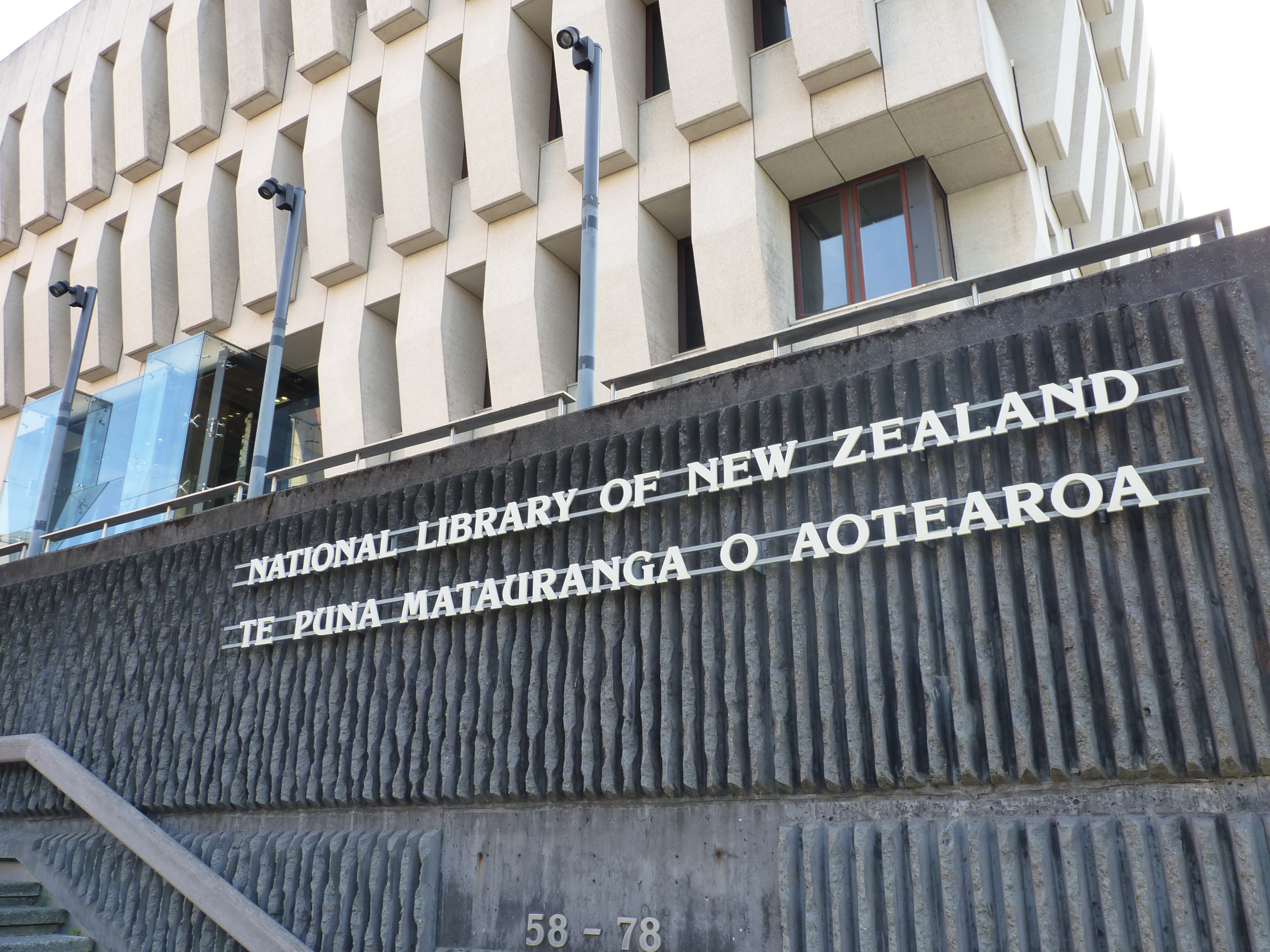
A bilingual sign outside the National Library of New Zealand headquarters uses Aotearoa alongside New Zealand.

Since the late 20th century Aotearoa is becoming widespread also in the bilingual names of national organisations, such as the National Library of New Zealand / Te Puna Mātauranga o Aotearoa.

The New Zealand province of the Anglican Church is divided into three cultural streams or tikanga (Aotearoa, New Zealand and Polynesia), with the Aotearoa tikanga covering Māori-speaking congregations within New Zealand.

In 2015, to celebrate Te Wiki o te Reo Māori (Māori Language Week), the Black Caps (the New Zealand national cricket team) played under the name Aotearoa for their first match against Zimbabwe.

=== Music ===
- Aotearoa is an overture composed in 1940 by Douglas Lilburn.
- The Land of the Long White Cloud, subtitled Aotearoa, is a piece composed in 1979 by Philip Sparke for brass band or wind band.
- "Aotearoa" is the Māori version of "God Defend New Zealand", a national anthem of New Zealand.
- Split Enz refers to Aotearoa in its 1982 song "Six Months in a Leaky Boat".

== Proposals for official use ==
A 2019 petition initiated by Danny Tahau Jobe for a referendum on whether the official name of New Zealand should change to include Aotearoa received 6,310 signatures.

In September 2021, Te Pāti Māori started a petition to change the name of New Zealand to Aotearoa. The petition received 50,000 signatures in two days, and over 70,000 by early June 2022. On 2 June, the petition was submitted to Parliament's Petitions Committee. Party co-leader Rawiri Waititi argued that the proposed name change would recognise New Zealand's indigenous heritage and strengthen its identity as a Pacific country. Waititi objected to the idea of a referendum, claiming it would entrench the "tyranny of the majority". National Party leader Christopher Luxon stated that renaming New Zealand was a constitutional issue that would require a referendum. Māori Development Minister Willie Jackson expressed concerns that a potential name change would create branding issues for the country's tourism industry.

A 1News–Colmar Brunton poll in September 2021 found that 58% of respondents wanted to keep the name New Zealand, 9% wanted to change the name to Aotearoa, and 31% wanted the joint name of Aotearoa New Zealand. A January 2023 Newshub-Reid Research poll showed a slight increase in support for the name Aotearoa, with 36.2% wanting Aotearoa New Zealand, 9.6% Aotearoa only, and 52% wanting to keep New Zealand only.

== See also ==
- List of New Zealand place name etymologies
- New Zealand place names
