= Waipori =

Waipori may refer to either:

- Waipori, New Zealand, a goldmining town that was flooded in 1924 for a hydroelectric power plant
- The Waipori River in Otago in the South Island of New Zealand, or to
- Lake Waipori, an area of wetlands draining into the Waipori River
- SS Waipori, a Union Company cargo ship
