= The Maniototo =

Elevated inland region in Otago, New Zealand

Coordinates: 45.1536°S 170.0392°E

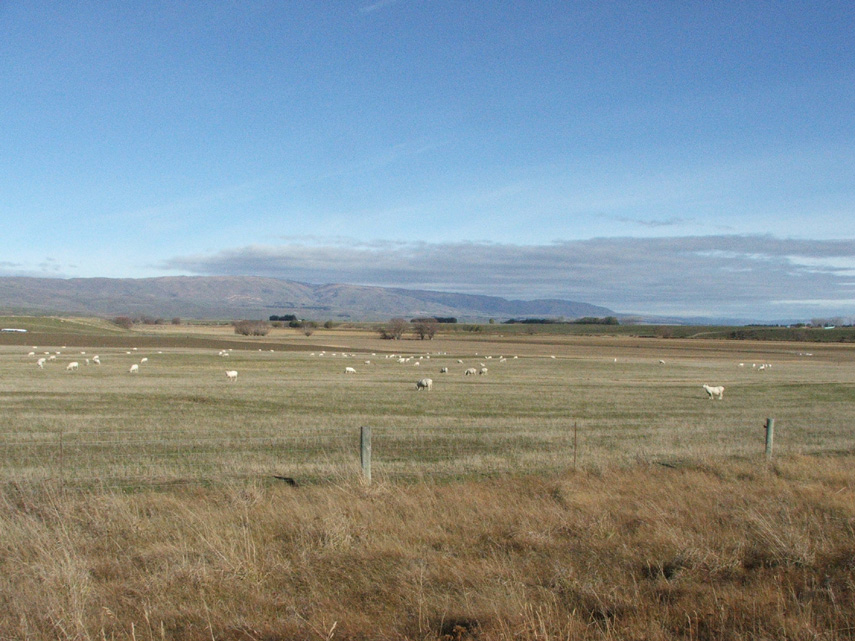
Looking southwest across the Maniototo towards Rough Ridge from near Ranfurly

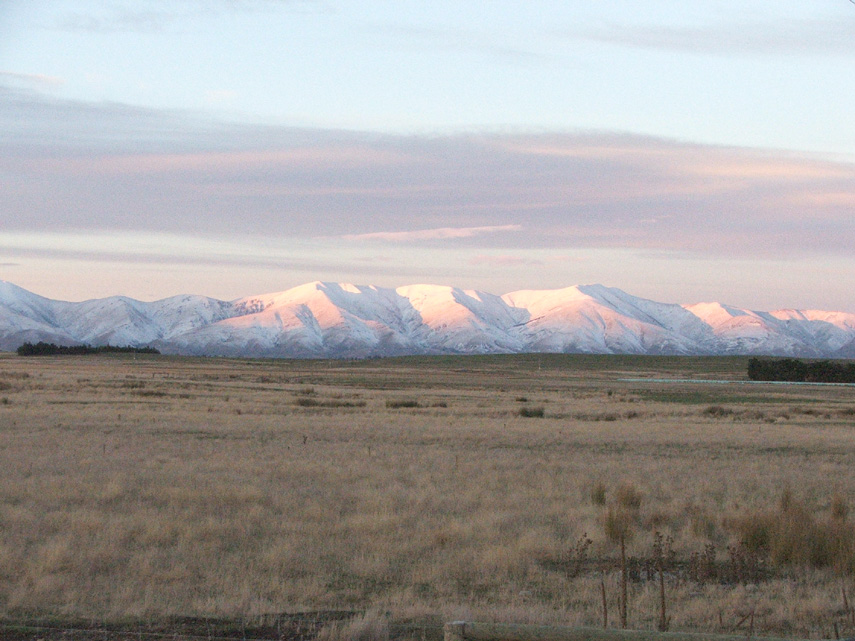
The Kakanui Range dominates the eastern horizon of the Maniototo

The Māniatoto (often misspelt as Maniototo) Plain, usually simply known as The Māniatoto, is an elevated inland region in Otago, New Zealand. The region roughly surrounds the upper reaches of the Taieri River and the Manuherikia River. It is bounded by the Kākaunui Range (often misspelt as Kakanui Range) to the north and the Rock and Pillar Range to the southeast. It has a harsh, dry climate, ranging from over 30°C in mid-summer to -15°C in mid-winter.

The region is sparsely populated, with the largest centres being Ranfurly, Naseby, Wedderburn and Ōtūrehua.

Part of the Canterbury-Otago tussock grasslands the land surrounding the plain is hilly, with many outcrops of rock which also break up the plain in places.

During the 1860s the region was one of the sites of the Otago gold rush, and relics from that era can still be seen around the towns of Kyeburn, Naseby, and St. Bathans.

Sheep farming is the major source of income. The area is closely associated with the sport of curling. Naseby has the only indoor curling rink and the only natural luge track in the Southern Hemisphere.

== Demographics ==
The Māniatoto statistical area covers 2,370.97 km^{2} (915.44 sq mi) and had an estimated population of 1,790 as of June 2025, with a population density of 0.8 people per km^{2}.

Historical population
Year	Pop.	±% p.a.
2006	1,566	—
2013	1,554	−0.11%
2018	1,635	+1.02%

Māniatoto had a population of 1,635 at the 2018 New Zealand census, an increase of 81 people (5.2%) since the 2013 census, and an increase of 69 people (4.4%) since the 2006 census. There were 693 households, comprising 837 males and 798 females, giving a sex ratio of 1.05 males per female. The median age was 48.2 years (compared with 37.4 years nationally), with 279 people (17.1%) aged under 15 years, 228 (13.9%) aged 15 to 29, 726 (44.4%) aged 30 to 64, and 399 (24.4%) aged 65 or older.

Ethnicities were 90.8% Pākehā, 9.5% Māori, 0.7% Pāsifikā, 5.0% Asian, and 1.1% other ethnicities. People may identify with more than one ethnicity.

The percentage of people born overseas was 11.9, compared with 27.1% nationally.

Although some people chose not to answer the census's question about religious affiliation, 42.0% had no religion, 49.5% were Christian, 0.2% had Māori religious beliefs, 0.2% were Hindu and 0.9% had other religions.

Of those at least 15 years old, 177 (13.1%) people had a bachelor's or higher degree, and 327 (24.1%) people had no formal qualifications. The median income was $29,100, compared with $31,800 nationally. 150 people (11.1%) earned over $70,000 compared to 17.2% nationally. The employment status of those at least 15 was that 678 (50.0%) people were employed full-time, 225 (16.6%) were part-time, and 18 (1.3%) were unemployed.

== Maniototo County Council ==
Maniototo County Council existed between June 1877 and October 1989, when it became part of the Central Otago District Council. It was larger than the statistical area, at 1,239 mi^{2} (3,210 km^{2}) and included the ridings of Mount Ida (Naseby), Hyde, St. Bathans, Serpentine, Kyeburn, Puketoi and Idaburn. The county offices were moved from Naseby to Ranfurly in 1936.

== Name ==
The original Māori name for the area, Māniatoto 'blood-red plains', refers to the red tussock that covers the landscape

Early Pākehā settlers knew the area as Napiers Plain after Peter Napier, who purchased a run there in the 1850s.

'Maniatoto' was the official name adopted by the Honorary Geographic Board of New Zealand in 1928, but the county council preferred 'Maniototo', possibly because it had already installed a large sign with that spelling.

While the New Zealand Geographic Board reaffirmed the Maniatoto spelling in 1948, it changed the official name to Maniototo in 1954 due to "long and accepted usage".

In late May 2024, the Central Otago District Council (CODC) rejected a motion to correct the spelling of the Maniototo Community Board to Māniatoto. While the CODC acknowledged the error, the majority of councillors voted against the correction since it was not supported by the community board. According to board member and Councillor Stu Duncan, 90% of the community opposed the correction. Mayor of Central Otago Tim Cadogan was the only member of the Council to support the improvement.

== Environment ==
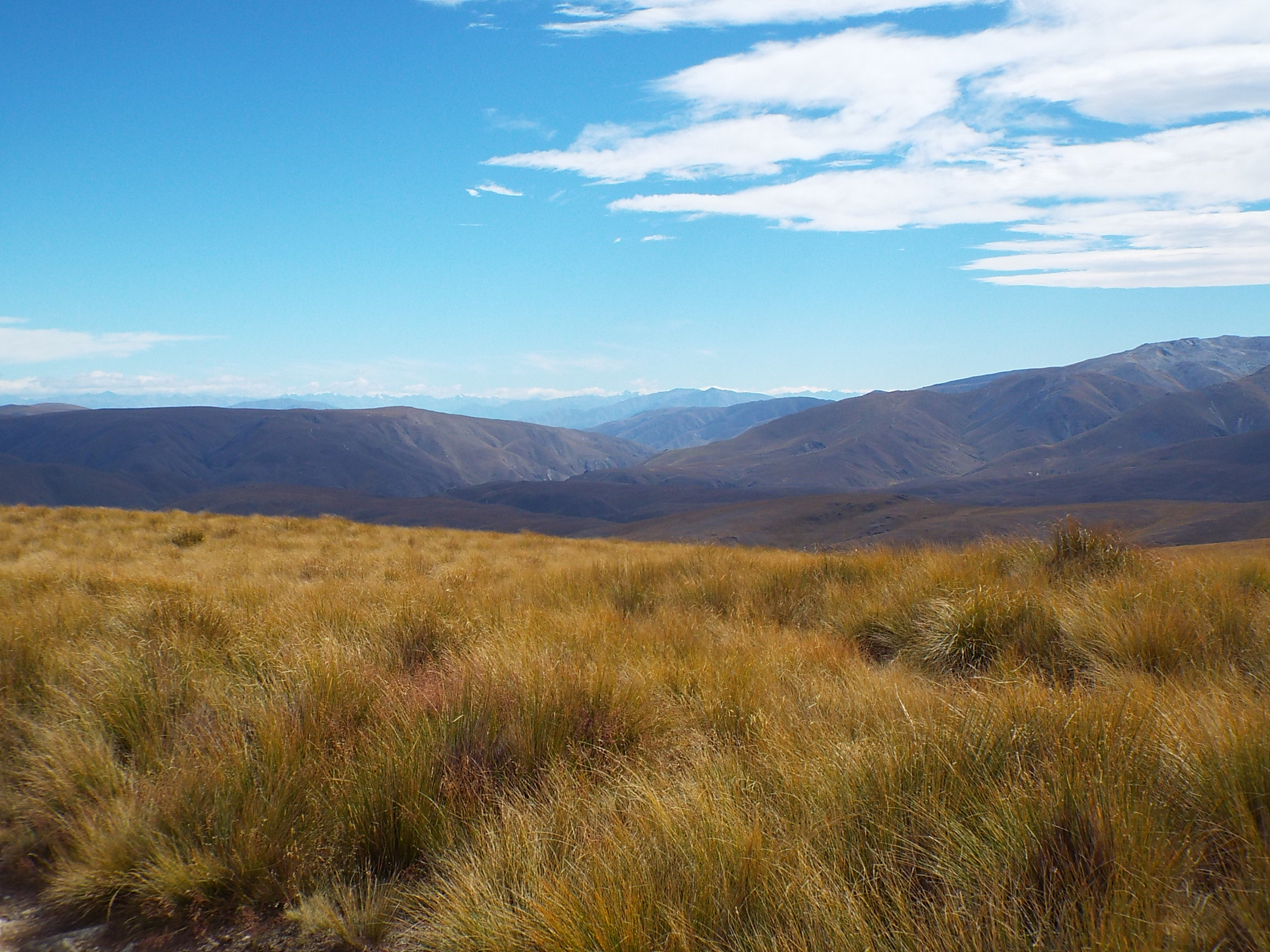
Tussock landscape of the Oteake Conservation Park from the side of the Maniototo

The Mānaitoto is home to an array of native Aotearoa New Zealand wildlife and plants. The Ōtekaike Conservation Park managed by the Department of Conservation can be found at the northern end of the plain.

The Upper Taiari River flows through the Māniatoto and is one of the only scroll plains in the Southern Hemisphere. The scroll plain works its way across the Māniatoto and once flowed into an oxbow lake near the township of Kokonga. The lake was drained through agricultural practices. Today, there is much work underway through an initiative called Tiaki Maniototo the local community, farmers and business to restore the scroll plain and enrich the biodiversity that can be found here.

The Māniatoto is home to native species of Aotearoa New Zealand freshwater fish known as Galaxias. Rare roundhead galaxias (Galaxias anomalus) and flathead galaxias (Galaxias depressiceps) can be found in many creeks, streams and rivers across the plain and there is much work underway to protect their habitats from damage and parasitic introduced species such as trout. Some species of Galaxias found in the waterways of the plain are endemic to the region.

== In popular culture ==
In the novel Living in the Maniototo by Janet Frame, the region acts as a metaphor for the 'bloody plain' of the human imagination.

The scenery between Ōmakau and Ranfurly appeared in Peter Jackson's The Lord of the Rings film trilogy as the location for many of the scenes set in Rohan.

The cast and crew of the Jane Campion film The Power of the Dog which stars Benedict Cumberbatch stayed in Naseby while filming in the Ida Valley in the Māniatoto.

== See also ==
- Wedderburn
- Patearoa
- Gimmerburn
- Lammermoor Range
- Danseys Pass
