= Coonoor, New Zealand =

Sheep-farming district in New Zealand

Coonoor
- Interactive map of Coonoor
- Coordinates: 40°26′S 176°06′E
- Country: New Zealand
- Region: Manawatū-Whanganui
- Territorial authority: Tararua District

Coonoor is a small sheep-farming district in the Northern Wairarapa, approximately 38 km south-east of Dannevirke, and 48 km north-east of Pahiatua. The name Coonoor was first used for one of the early sheep runs in the district, and later became the name of the district and small school. Coonoor is situated at the double junction of four roads. One goes straight to Dannevirke, crossing the boundary between Wellington and Hawkes Bay provinces. The second main route leads to Pahiatua via Makuri, which has always been a larger centre of population than Coonoor, and the locale of several social and sports clubs. The third road crosses the Puketoi Range to Horoeka, Waione, Pongaroa and the East Coast, while the fourth, known as the Makairo Track, is no longer open to vehicular traffic, and heads toward Woodville, between Dannevirke and Pahiatua. This narrow winding road is now a favourite route for mountain bikers.
