= Wedderburn, New Zealand =

Community in Otago, New Zealand

Coordinates: 45°02′S 170°01′E

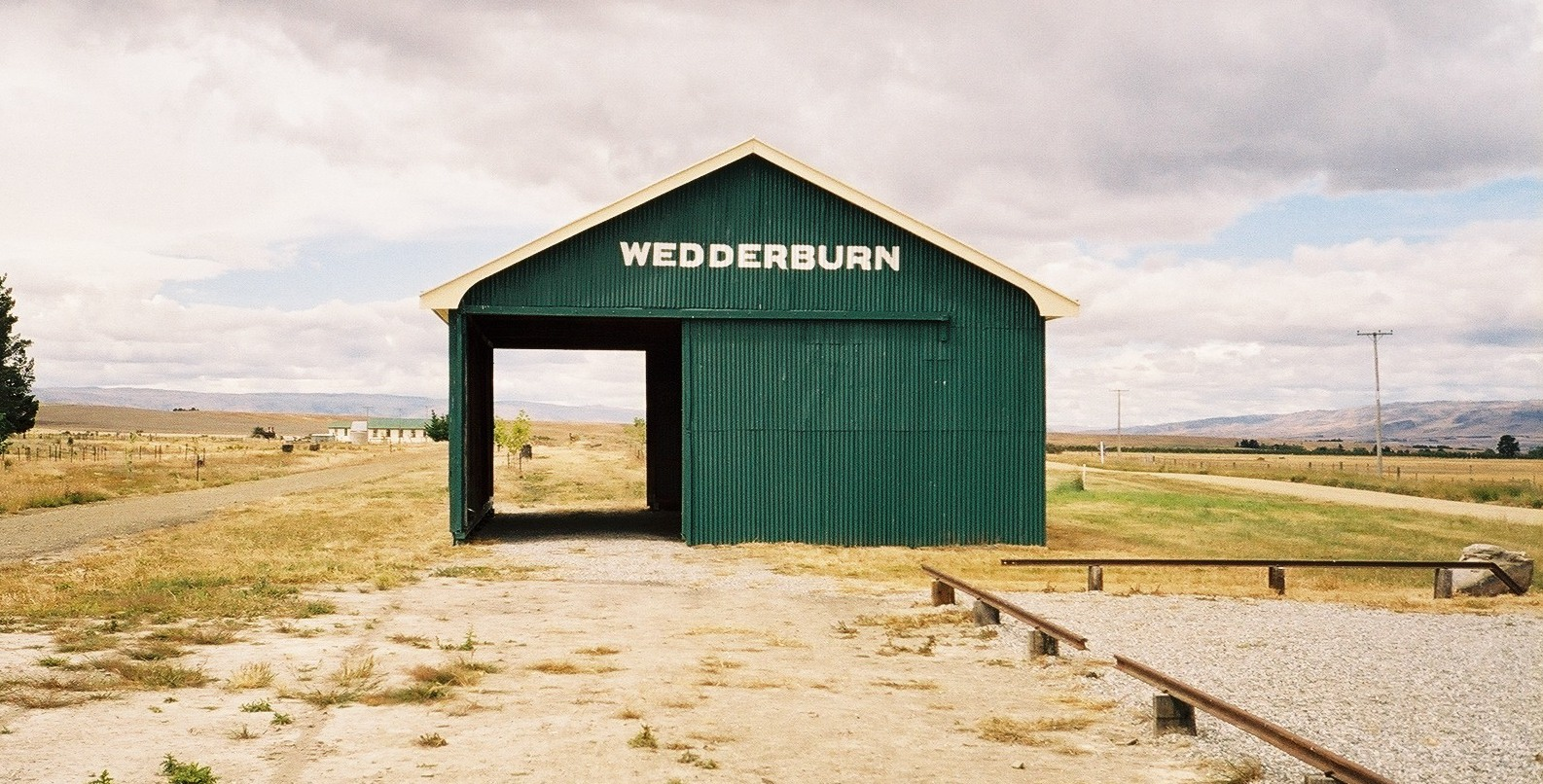
Wedderburn goods shed

Wedderburn is a community in Central Otago, New Zealand. Located 15 kilometres northwest of Ranfurly, it was once a centre for gold and coal mining. The name Wedderburn was given to the area by John Turnbull Thomson, and is one of the names in his Thomson's Barnyard. "Wedder" is a Northumbrian dialect word for wether, meaning a castrated sheep.

Wedderburn is on State Highway 85 close to the Otago Central Rail Trail. Originally a coaching stop, it became a terminus on the Otago Central Railway in 1921 and headquarters for the Public Works Department during construction of the line section. This section was eventually abandoned due to declining traffic. The line was sustained in the 1980s by carrying materials for the Clyde Dam, which inundated the line between Clyde and Cromwell. However, traffic fell below sustainable levels after the dam's completion, leading to official closure.

Following closure, the Otago Excursion Train Trust and Dunedin City Council bought the track through the scenic Taieri Gorge up to Middlemarch to form the Taieri Gorge Railway Ltd. The remaining track was removed, and this section became the 150-kilometre Otago Central Rail Trail from Middlemarch to Clyde for recreational use. The trail passes through Wedderburn, past the Wedderburn goods shed.

Artist Grahame Sydney made the Wedderburn railway goods shed famous in his 1975 painting, which depicted the shed in an austere Otago landscape, representing the economic and social changes brought by railways. The shed was later removed to a site five kilometres away but returned following public protest. The shed is now conserved and has been restored to its recognisable green colour.
