= Ranfurly, New Zealand =

Ranfurly
- Settlement
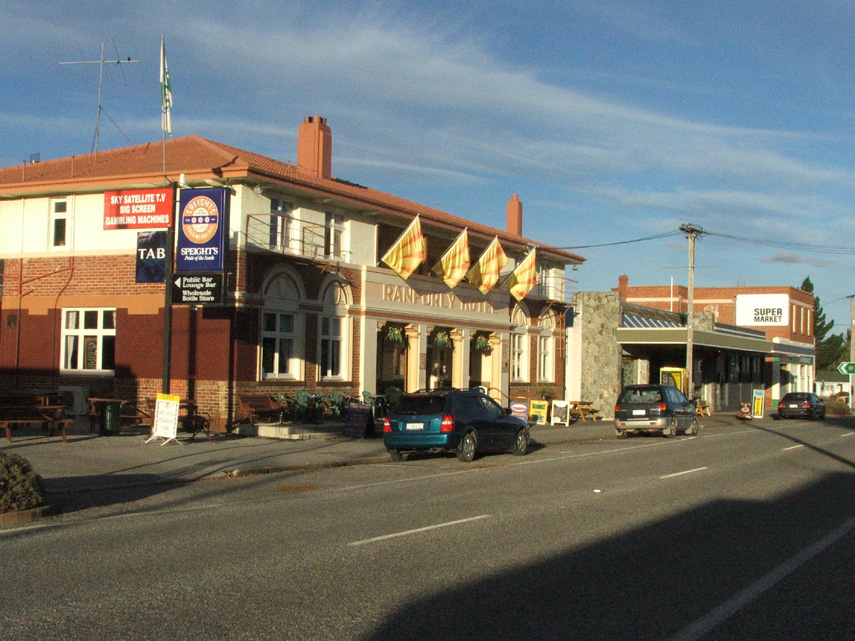
- The main street of Ranfurly
- Interactive map of Ranfurly
- Coordinates: 45°08′S 170°06′E
- Country: New Zealand
- Region: Otago
- Territorial authority: Central Otago District
- Ward: Maniototo Ward
- Community: Maniototo Community
- Electorates: Waitaki; Te Tai Tonga (Māori)

Government
  - Territorial authority: Central Otago District Council
  - Regional council: Otago Regional Council
  - Mayor of Central Otago: Tamah Alley
  - Waitaki MP: Miles Anderson
  - Te Tai Tonga MP: Mananui Ramsden

Area
  - Urban area: 3.86 km^{2} (1.49 sq mi)

Population (June 2025)
  - Urban area: 770
  - Density: 200/km^{2} (520/sq mi)
- Time zone: UTC+12 (NZST)
  - Summer (DST): UTC+13 (NZDT)

Ranfurly is a town in the Central Otago District of Otago, New Zealand. Located 110 kilometres (68 miles) north of Dunedin, it lies in the dry rough plain of Maniototo at a moderately high altitude (around 430 metres or 1,410 feet above sea level) close to a small tributary of the Taieri River. It operates as a service town for the local farming community. The town was formerly known as Eweburn, one of the "farmyard" names bestowed by former Otago Chief Surveyor John Turnbull Thomson on many small streams and locations in the district. The modern name honours the Fifth Earl of Ranfurly, who served as Governor of New Zealand (1897–1904) at the time of the extension of the Otago Central Railway to the area. Ranfurly is well known for its Art Deco buildings, such as its hotel and the dairy.

== History ==
During the Otago gold rush of the 1860s, several important deposits of the precious metal were found near Ranfurly, notably at Kyeburn and Naseby, close to the southwestern face of the Kakanui Range.

After the gold-rush faded Ranfurly grew at the expense of Naseby, spurred by the arrival of the railway in 1898. The rail line was closed in 1989 and the track removed, but its course became a major walking and cycling route, the Otago Central Rail Trail, which attracts tourists. The former railway station now serves as a museum and display centre.

The town became an important service-centre for the rural community, experiencing a building boom in the 1930s. It has a large proportion of rural Art Deco buildings which have been preserved from that time. An annual festival commemorating Ranfurly's Art Deco heritage used to take place each February.

The nearby Ida Valley functioned as one of the locations for Peter Jackson's 2001–2003 Lord of the Rings film trilogy, representing the wide plains of Rohan.

== Climate ==
Under the Köppen climate classification Ranfurly has an oceanic climate (Cfb), with continental influence.

Central Otago in general, and the Maniototo in particular, has one of New Zealand's very few zones influenced by continental climates, with large daily and seasonal temperature extremes. Average highs in summer are around 22 °C (72 °F), with occasional days as warm as 30 °C (86 °F); average winter highs are around 7 °C (45 °F), with the coldest nights below −8 °C (18 °F). The lowest temperature on record in New Zealand (−25.6 °C or −14.1 °F) was recorded at Ranfurly in 1903. Severe frosts are common from April through to November.

The town is sheltered from the prevailing rain patterns by the mountains to the west. The Nor'wester foehn wind is thus a frequent weather pattern, and annual rainfall is only in the region of 400–500 mm (16–20 in).

Climate data for Ranfurly, elev. 450 m (1,480 ft) (1991–2020; extremes 1897–1922, 1975–2025)
Month	Jan	Feb	Mar	Apr	May	Jun	Jul	Aug	Sep	Oct	Nov	Dec	Year
Record high °C (°F)	33.7 (92.7)	33.5 (92.3)	30.8 (87.4)	27.8 (82.0)	22.7 (72.9)	18.6 (65.5)	17.6 (63.7)	23.0 (73.4)	23.6 (74.5)	26.8 (80.2)	29.2 (84.6)	32.3 (90.1)	33.7 (92.7)
Mean maximum °C (°F)	30.4 (86.7)	29.7 (85.5)	27.2 (81.0)	22.9 (73.2)	18.7 (65.7)	15.8 (60.4)	14.9 (58.8)	16.8 (62.2)	20.1 (68.2)	23.2 (73.8)	25.9 (78.6)	28.6 (83.5)	31.6 (88.9)
Mean daily maximum °C (°F)	22.0 (71.6)	21.9 (71.4)	19.7 (67.5)	15.7 (60.3)	11.8 (53.2)	8.2 (46.8)	7.9 (46.2)	10.3 (50.5)	13.5 (56.3)	15.7 (60.3)	17.9 (64.2)	20.5 (68.9)	15.4 (59.8)
Daily mean °C (°F)	15.1 (59.2)	14.7 (58.5)	12.5 (54.5)	9.2 (48.6)	6.1 (43.0)	3.0 (37.4)	2.6 (36.7)	4.6 (40.3)	7.2 (45.0)	9.2 (48.6)	11.2 (52.2)	13.7 (56.7)	9.1 (48.4)
Mean daily minimum °C (°F)	8.1 (46.6)	7.4 (45.3)	5.4 (41.7)	2.7 (36.9)	0.4 (32.7)	−2.2 (28.0)	−2.6 (27.3)	−1.1 (30.0)	1.0 (33.8)	2.8 (37.0)	4.6 (40.3)	6.9 (44.4)	2.8 (37.0)
Mean minimum °C (°F)	1.3 (34.3)	1.0 (33.8)	−1.1 (30.0)	−3.6 (25.5)	−6.0 (21.2)	−7.9 (17.8)	−8.2 (17.2)	−6.6 (20.1)	−4.9 (23.2)	−3.7 (25.3)	−1.7 (28.9)	0.6 (33.1)	−9.0 (15.8)
Record low °C (°F)	−2.8 (27.0)	−3.3 (26.1)	−8.9 (16.0)	−10.6 (12.9)	−14.5 (5.9)	−15.0 (5.0)	−25.6 (−14.1)	−18.3 (−0.9)	−12.2 (10.0)	−8.9 (16.0)	−5.6 (21.9)	−3.9 (25.0)	−25.6 (−14.1)
Average rainfall mm (inches)	57.1 (2.25)	44.7 (1.76)	35.1 (1.38)	37.0 (1.46)	34.0 (1.34)	33.1 (1.30)	23.3 (0.92)	23.0 (0.91)	28.0 (1.10)	37.2 (1.46)	42.2 (1.66)	61.2 (2.41)	455.9 (17.95)
Source: NIWA

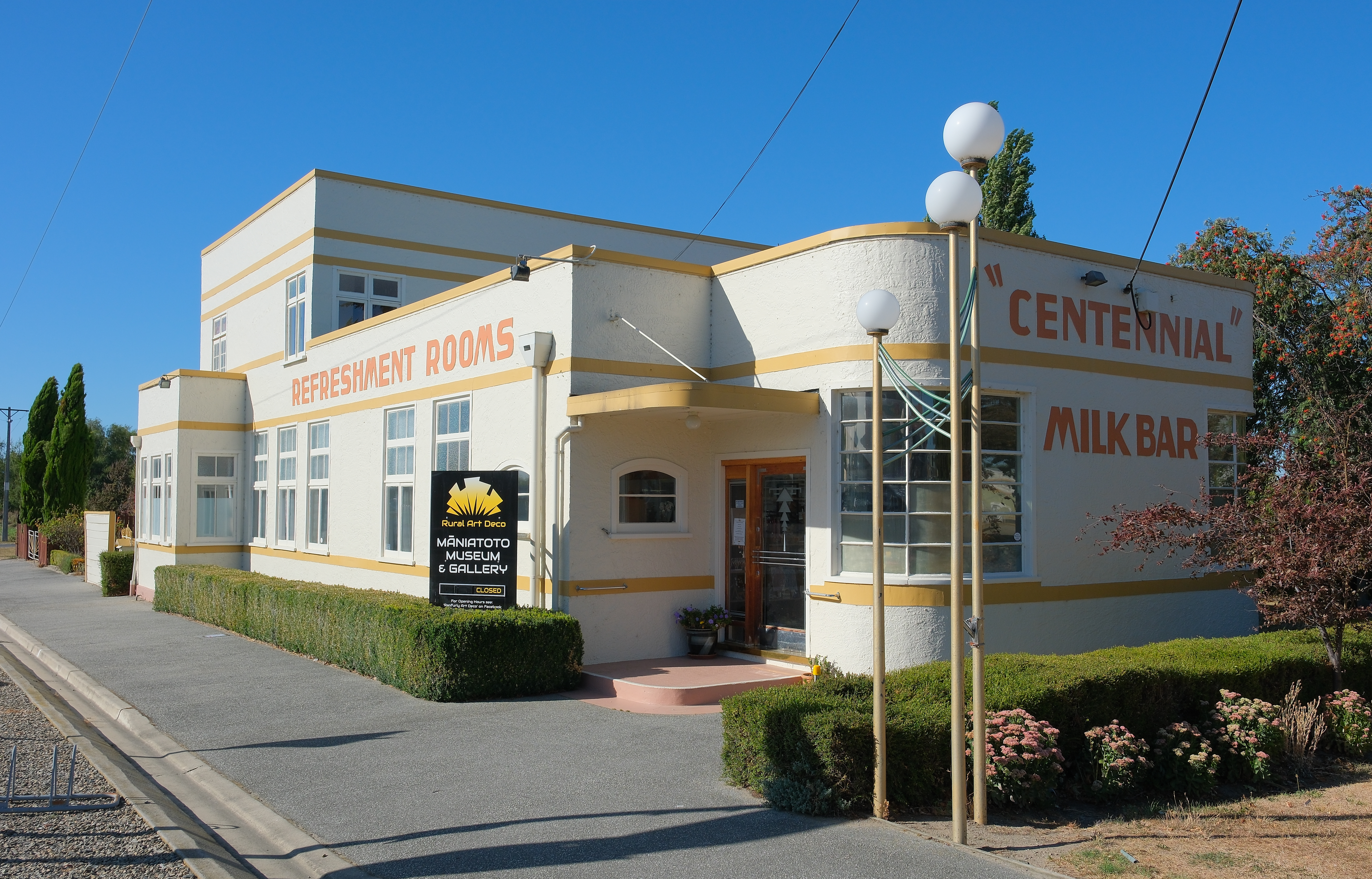
Ranfurly's Art Deco milk bar

== Demographics ==
Ranfurly is described by Statistics New Zealand as a rural settlement. It covers 3.86 km^{2} (1.49 sq mi) and had an estimated population of 770 as of June 2025, with a population density of 199 people per km^{2}. It is part of the much larger Maniototo statistical area.

Historical population
Year	Pop.	±% p.a.
2006	714	—
2013	666	−0.99%
2018	726	+1.74%

Ranfurly had a population of 726 at the 2018 New Zealand census, an increase of 60 people (9.0%) since the 2013 census, and an increase of 12 people (1.7%) since the 2006 census. There were 333 households, comprising 348 males and 375 females, giving a sex ratio of 0.93 males per female, with 90 people (12.4%) aged under 15 years, 93 (12.8%) aged 15 to 29, 288 (39.7%) aged 30 to 64, and 246 (33.9%) aged 65 or older.

Ethnicities were 91.3% European/Pākehā, 12.8% Māori, 1.2% Pasifika, 3.3% Asian, and 0.4% other ethnicities. People may identify with more than one ethnicity.

Although some people chose not to answer the census's question about religious affiliation, 43.4% had no religion, 48.8% were Christian, 0.4% were Hindu and 0.8% had other religions.

Of those at least 15 years old, 48 (7.5%) people had a bachelor's or higher degree, and 192 (30.2%) people had no formal qualifications. 57 people (9.0%) earned over $70,000 compared to 17.2% nationally. The employment status of those at least 15 was that 252 (39.6%) people were employed full-time, 105 (16.5%) were part-time, and 9 (1.4%) were unemployed.

== Sport ==
Ranfurly lies close to the heart of New Zealand's curling-playing region, and the local club have represented New Zealand at the 1999, 2004, and 2005 World Championships (finishing tenth, seventh and eighth respectively), as well as providing members for the New Zealand 2006 Winter Olympics curling team.

Ranfurly has been the birthplace of several recent members of the New Zealand women's (field) hockey team.

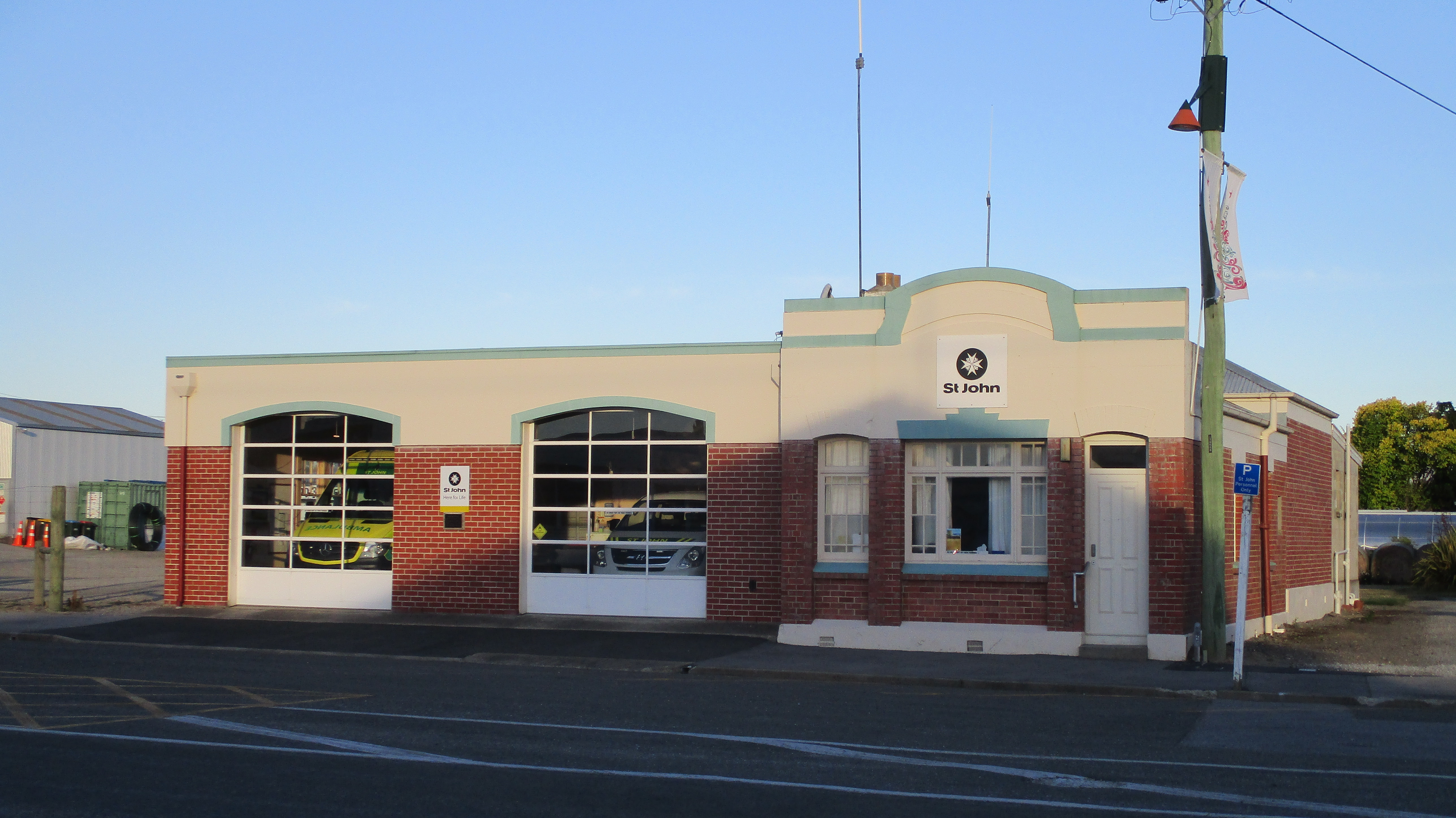
St John's Station

== Education ==
Maniototo Area School is a co-educational state area school for Year 1 to 13 students, with a roll of 136 as of July 2026. The school has predecessors from 1879.

St John's School is a co-educational state-integrated Catholic primary school for Year 1 to 8 students, with a roll of 63 as of July 2026. It was established in 1945.

== Notable people ==
- Sean Becker, curler
- Shane Collins, field hockey player
- John Grenell, country singer
- Andrew Hore, All Black
- Robert Logan, military leader and politician
- Warren McSkimming, cricketer
- Peter Petherick, cricketer and lawn bowls player
- Mandy Smith, field hockey player
- Isobel Thomson, field hockey player
- David Kilgour, musician
