= Wairoa River (Auckland) =

River in Auckland, New Zealand

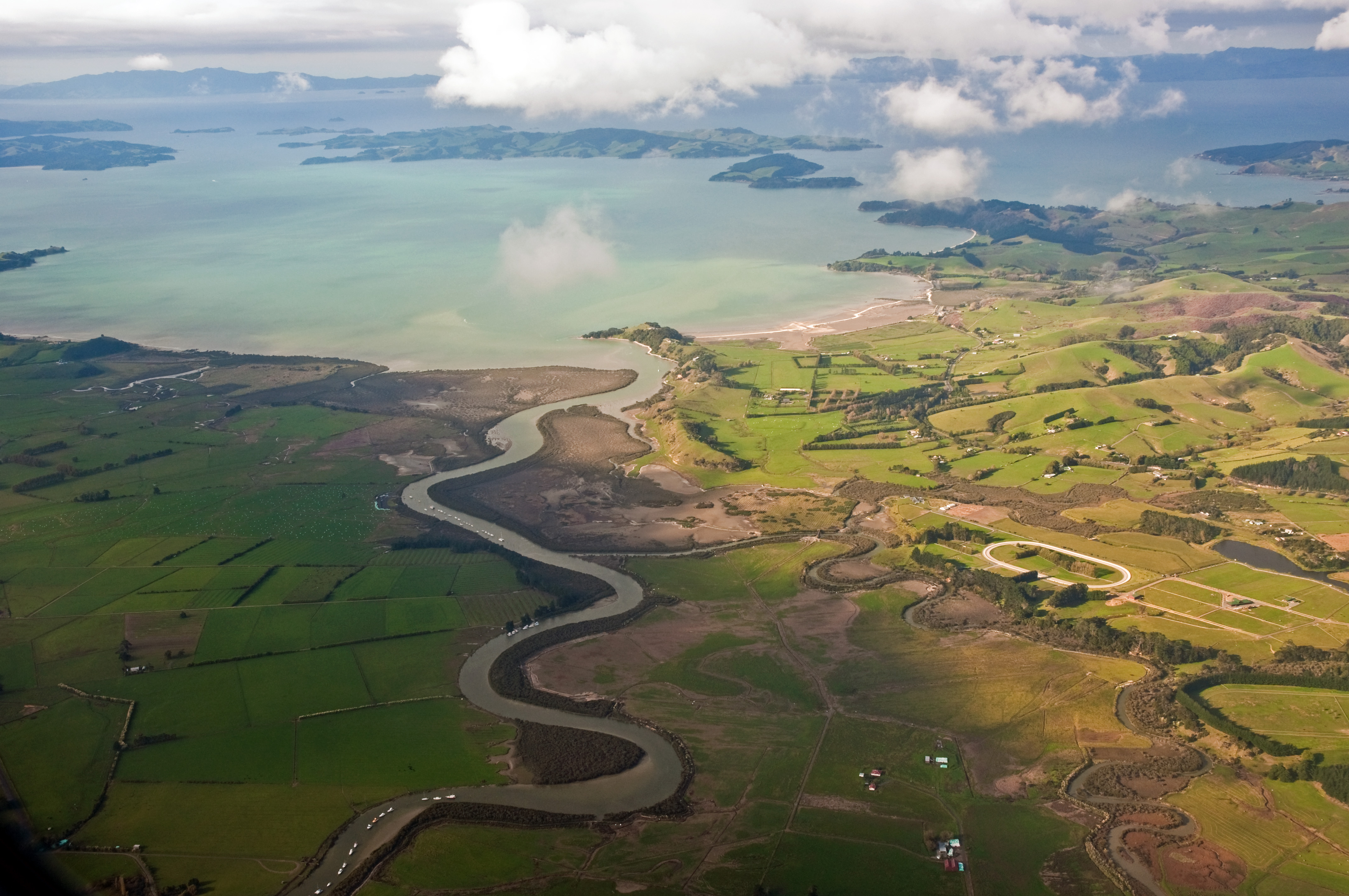
- An aerial view of the Wairoa River mouth

- Mouth of the Wairoa River Wairoa River (Auckland) (New Zealand)
- Route of the Wairoa River

Location
- Country: New Zealand
- Region: Auckland Region

Physical characteristics
- Source: Hunua Ranges
  - coordinates: 37.04425°S 175.14773°E
- Mouth: Tāmaki Strait
  - coordinates: 36.938916°S 175.090313°E

Basin features
- Progression: Wairoa River → Tāmaki Strait → Hauraki Gulf → Pacific Ocean
- Landmarks: Clevedon
- Tributaries
  - left: Mangawheau Stream, Hunua Stream, Taitaia Stream
  - right: Cosseys Creek, Urungahauhau Stream
- Waterbodies: Wairoa Reservoir
- Waterfalls: Hunua Falls
- Bridges: Clevedon Wharf Bridge

The Wairoa River, also known as Wairoa South, is the second longest river in the Auckland Region of New Zealand's North Island. It flows south from its sources in the Hunua Ranges, then northwards into the Hauraki Gulf. The Wairoa Reservoir and Hūnua Falls form sections of the river, and the Wairoa River flows adjacent to the township of Clevedon.

== Description ==
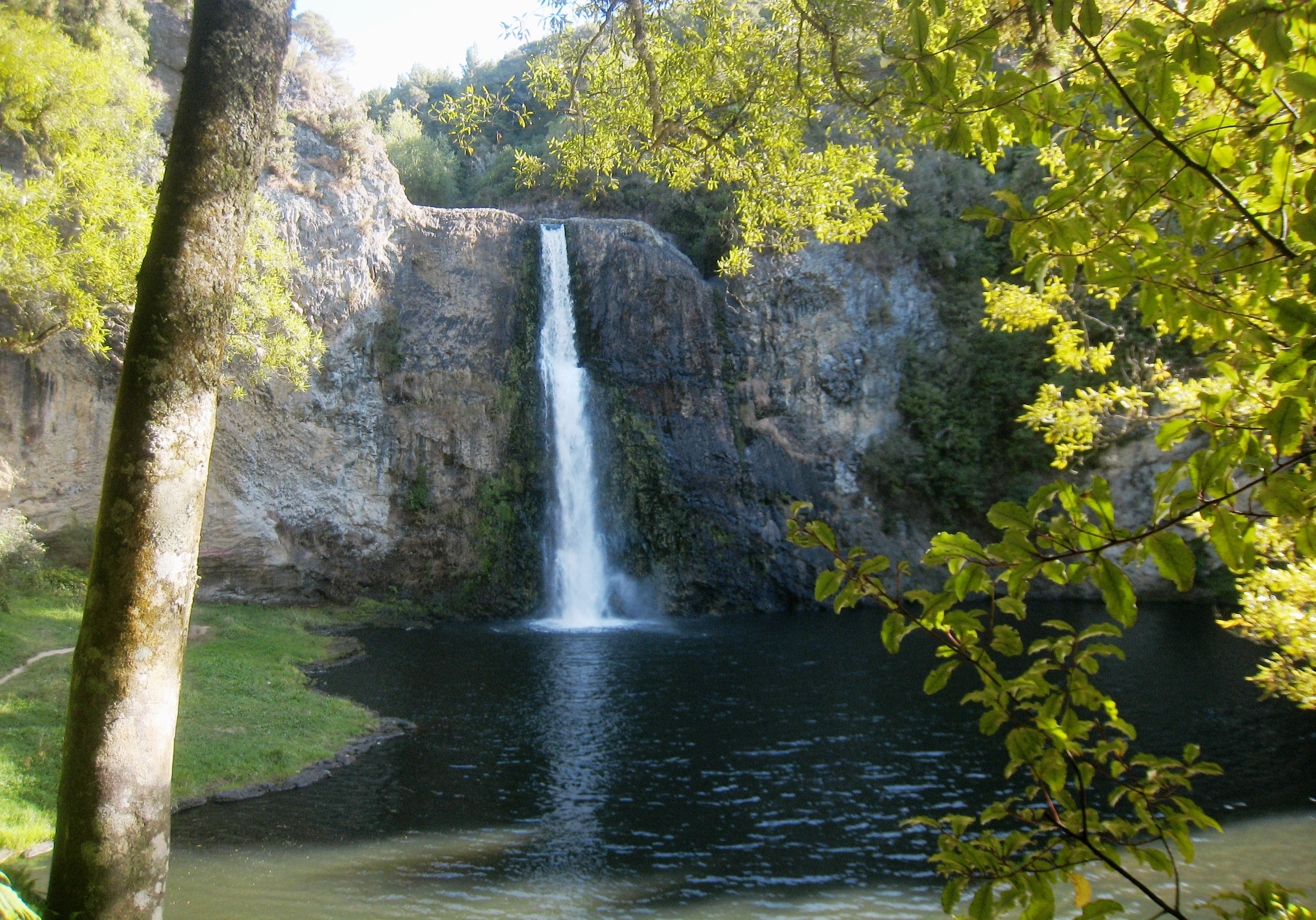
The Wairoa River plunges over the Hunua Falls

The river begins in the central Hunua Ranges, flowing south to the Wairoa Reservoir, and once exiting the Hunua Ranges changing course to flow northwards. Paparimu Road and Hunua Road follow the course of the river as it flows northwards through farmland. Much of the western Hunua Ranges flows into the Wairoa River, including Cosseys Creek and the Ōtau Valley, both of which have been dammed as freshwater reservoirs. In addition to these, the Wairoa River is joined by other tributaries: the Mangawheau Stream, the Hunua Stream which flows past the settlement of Hūnua, and the Taitaia Stream, which meets the Wairoa River north of Clevedon. Past Clevedon, the river veers north-east, meeting the Urungahauhau Stream and the Aroaro Stream of the Ness Valley and forming an estuary. The estuary reaches the Hauraki Gulf at Pouto Point in the east.

== Geology ==
The river first formed during the Pliocene era, approximately 3 to 4 million years ago. Originally it was a westwards-flowing river, flowing into the proto-Manukau Harbour past Weymouth. Much of the river flows along the Wairoa River Gorge, formed along a fault line. The Hūnua Falls, a 30 metre high waterfall, flows overtop of an ancient volcanic plug.

== History ==
The Wairoa River's traditional name, Te Wairoa ("The Great River") was named by early Ngāi Tai ki Tāmaki ancestors of the Tainui waka, referencing Te Vairoa in Rarotonga, which in turn took its name from a similarly named river in Tahiti. Te Wairoa was a name applying to the river mouth and surrounding area, while Ōtau referred to the upstream areas further, including where the river passes by Clevedon. The early Tāmaki Māori hapū of the Wairoa river valley between the 14th and 16th centuries included Te Ngungukauri, Te Uri Kupai, Ngāti Ruangaingai and Ngāti Parahanga, who identified as both Ngāti Tai Manawaiti, and Ngā Iwi (Waiohua). The related hapū were united under the rangatira Te Wana in the early 18th century, under the name Ngāti Tai (now more widely known as Ngāi Tai ki Tāmaki). The river mouth formed the traditional heartland of Ngāi Tai ki Tāmaki. Ngāi Tai peoples traditionally lived in seasonal cycles, focusing on fishing and shellfish collecting, cultivations and collecting berries and snaring birds in the river's upper reaches, depending on the season. The river-mouth was used as a summer pioke (Shortspine spurdog shark) fishing ground, which were dried for the winter months. Ngāi Tai settled at many pā and kāinga along the river, especially at the river's mouth.

In November of 1769, Captain Cook visited the Hauraki Gulf area. Cook gifted potatoes to senior members of Te Uri ō Pou from Ōrere, who then planted these at Te Hūnua, along the Wairoa River (likely near modern-day Clevedon). These were the first crop of potatoes grown in New Zealand, and three years later, potatoes were gifted during a feast at Te Hūnua to the tribes of the Hauraki Gulf and Waikato, becoming some of the first varieties of rīwai (Māori potatoes) in New Zealand.

When William Thomas Fairburn visited the area in 1833, it was mostly unoccupied due to the events of the Musket Wars, as most members of Ngāi Tai had fled to temporary refuge in the Waikato. In 1836, Fairburn purchased 40,000 acres between Ōtāhuhu and Umupuia (Duders Beach), including much of the catchment of the Wairoa River. Fairburn's Purchase was investigated by the New Zealand Land Commission in 1841 and 1842 and found to be excessive and reduced in size. The disallowed parts of his purchase were not returned to Ngāi Tai, however in 1854 a reserve was created for Ngāi Tai between the eastern shores of the Wairoa River and Maraetai/Umupuia.

From 1854, European farming settlers began to arrive on the banks of the Wairoa River, forming the township of Clevedon. Ngāi Tai held a defended settlement on the eastern banks of the Wairoa River opposite Clevedon, known as Ōtau. During the first decade post European settlement, Ngāi Tai and the European settlers had cordial relations, trading goods and assisting each other. In September 1863 during the Invasion of the Waikato, Ōtau was attacked by the British army, and the village was evacuated. After which, the residents moved to live in communities at the river's mouth. For the remainder of the war, Ngāi Tai were designated as a "friendly" people by the Crown, and remained neutral in the fighting. After the Native Lands Act of 1865, the Native Land Court individuated the collective Ngāi Tai lands, and in the process the majority of land near the Wairoa River was alienated and sold to European farmers. During European settlement, most of the Wairoa River catchment was deforested.

In the early 1900s, the river mouth became popular with Auckland residents for duck shooting and picnicking. In 1955, the Cosseys Creek Dam was constructed in the Hunua Ranges, a rolled earth dam constructed to secure fresh water supplies for Auckland. This was joined by the Wairoa Ram in 1975. The construction of the dams significantly reduced the flow of the Wairoa River.

In 2002, the Auckland Regional Council began developing a management strategy for the river, with was further developed in 2016 with the founding of the Wairoa River Steering Group, now a part of the volunteer conversation group Friends of Te Wairoa Catchment, which formed in 2017. In 2017, the Wairoa River won a New Zealand River Award for being the most improved river in the Auckland Region.

== Recreation ==
The lower Wairoa River north of Clevedon is navigable by boats and canoes.

== See also ==
- List of rivers of New Zealand
