= Hunua (disambiguation) =

Hunua may refer to the following in New Zealand:

- Hūnua, a small settlement in the rural outskirts of south Auckland
- Hunua (New Zealand electorate)
- Hunua Ranges, a block of hilly country to the southeast of Auckland in the North Island
