= Hūnua Falls =

Waterfall in Auckland Region, New Zealand

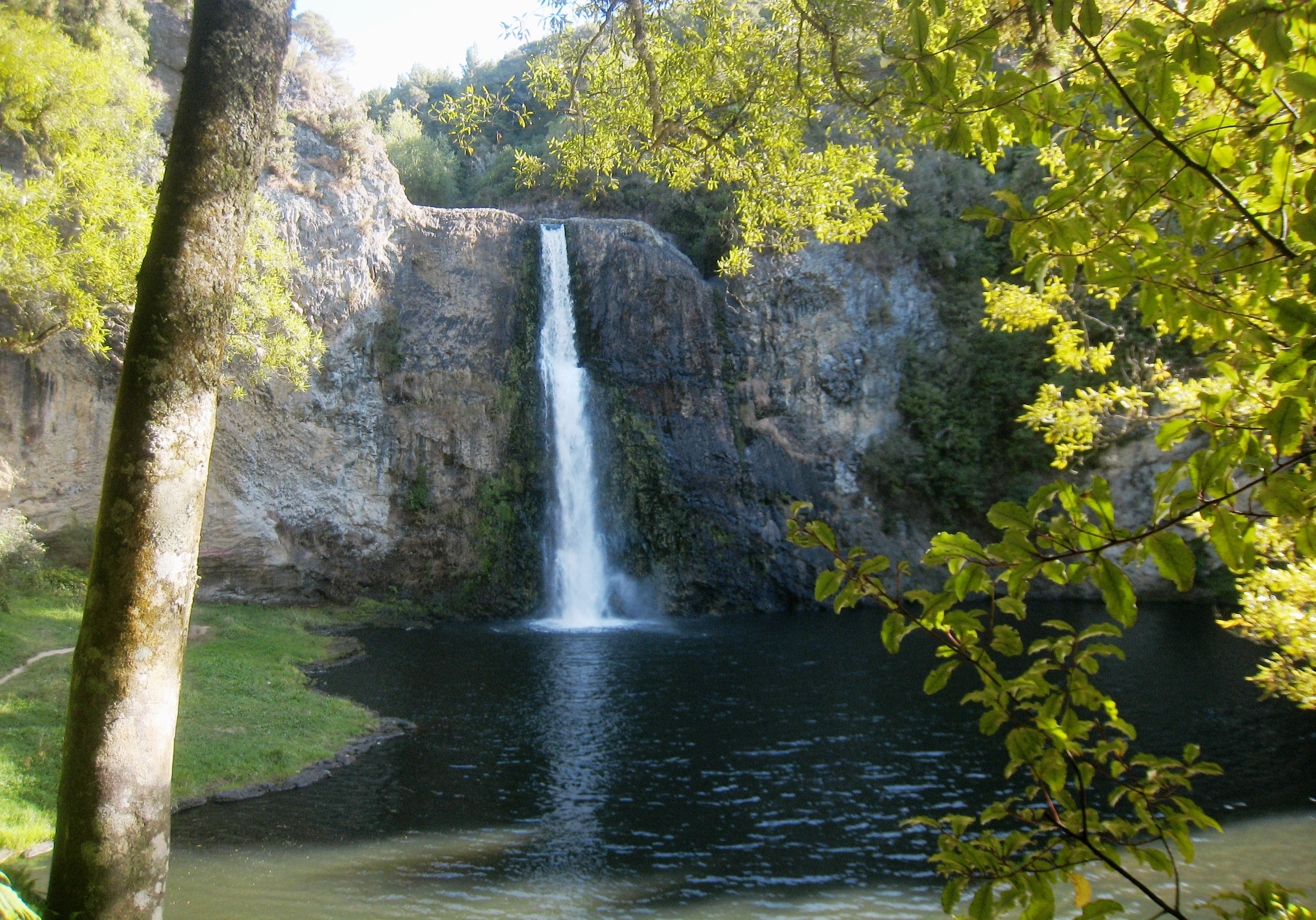
- Interactive map of Hūnua Falls
- Location: Hūnua
- Coordinates: 37°04′07″S 175°05′23″E
- Type: Horsetail
- Elevation: 60 metres (200 ft)
- Total height: 30 metres (98 ft)

The Hūnua Falls are on the Wairoa River in the Auckland Region of New Zealand, near Hūnua. The land around was bought by Auckland for water supplies between 1940 and 1960. The mean flow of water downstream at Clevedon is 2.6 m^{3}/s (570 impgal/s), but can vary greatly, as illustrated in photographs showing the falls in winter and summer.

== Natural features ==
The Wairoa River falls over a basalt lava plug which has intruded up a fault line. Volcanic tuff rings and lava bombs are visible in the east wall of the waterfall.

Several herbs have been identified near the falls - water starwort (Callitriche petriei), Crassula hunua, water pennywort (Hydrocotyle microphylla and Hydrocotyle hydrophila), wood-sorrel (Oxalis magellanica).

The Wairoa has smaller falls. Lily Falls (Unofficially known as Wairoa Falls) were described as 70 ft (21 m) high and 3 mi (4.8 km) downstream from Hūnua, in the Wairoa Gorge. A photograph appeared in 1901.

== Access and recreational activities ==
As well as tracks to the Hunua Ranges, there are two 30 minute walks; The Lookout Walk and the Upper Lookout Walk. The cliffs are used for abseiling.

== See also ==
- List of waterfalls
- List of waterfalls in New Zealand
