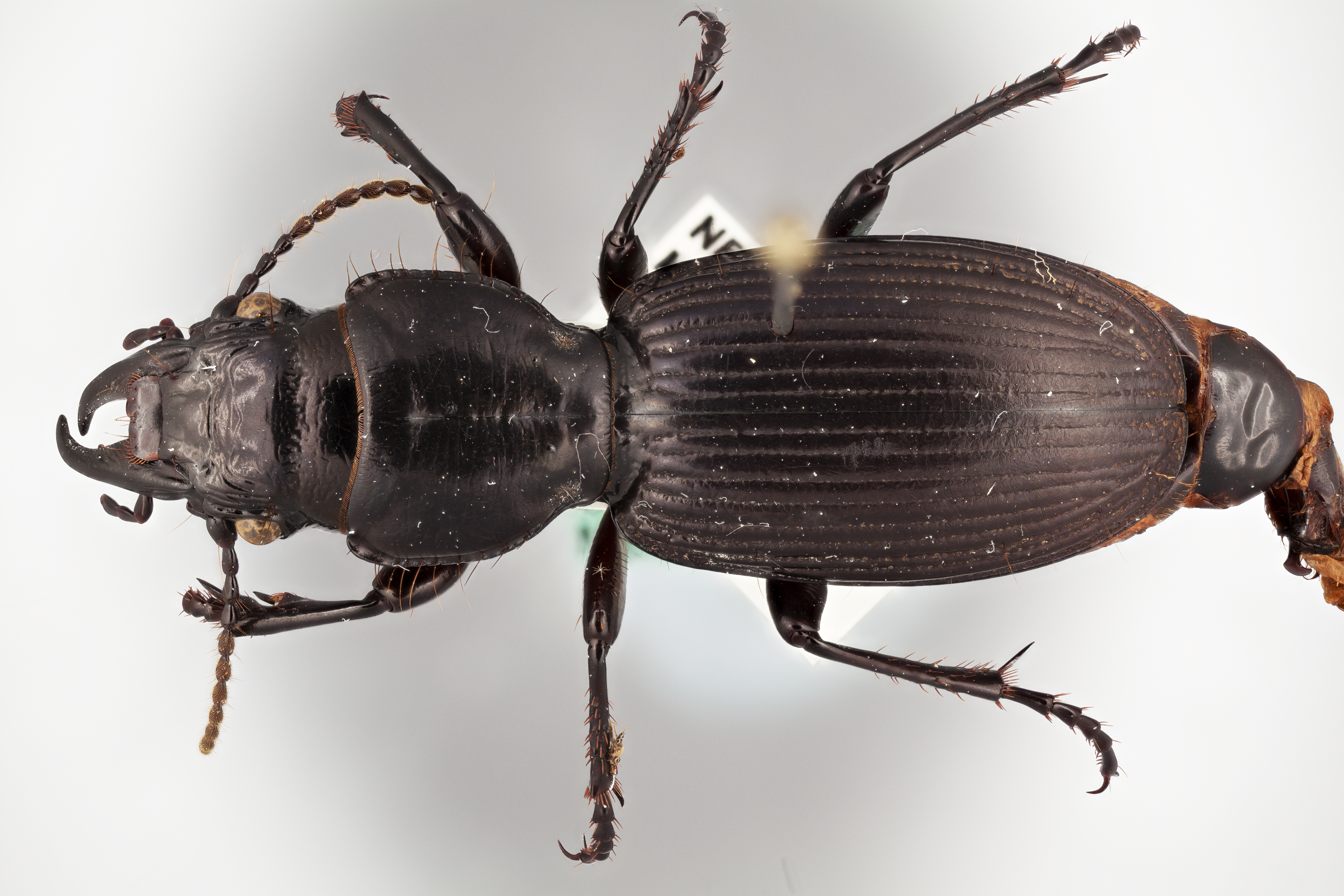
- Dorsal view of Mecodema scitulum

Scientific classification
- Kingdom: Animalia
- Phylum: Arthropoda
- Clade: Pancrustacea
- Class: Insecta
- Order: Coleoptera
- Suborder: Adephaga
- Family: Carabidae
- Genus: Mecodema
- Species: M. scitulum

Binomial name
- Mecodema scitulum Broun, 1894

= Mecodema scitulum =

Species of beetle

Mecodema scitulum is a species of endemic New Zealand flightless beetle in the family Carabidae. It was first described by Thomas Broun, in 1984, from a single specimen that he received from the Edwin Mitchelson. This species then became a junior synonym of Mecodema spiniferum after Everard B. Britton completed his revision of the New Zealand Broscini in 1949. Like Broun, Britton based this synonymy on the only specimen available, the holotype, because of the confusion surrounding the type locality where M. scitulum was collected from. However, D.S. Seldon and T.R. Buckley (2019) reinstated the species M. scitulum based on the morphological comparisons of 30+ specimens with the holotype and molecular analyses.

== Diagnosis ==
Mecodema scitulum is distinguished from other North Island Mecodema by the vertexal groove at the back of the head being defined by obsolescent (just visible) punctures along its entire length; the convexity of the elytral intervals and the unique shape of the apical portion of the penis lobe.

== Description ==
The range of lengths is 22–26.5 mm and the width range (elytra) is 6–7 mm. The colour of the entire body is matte black.

== Natural history ==
This species is found in regenerating native forest in the northern parts of the Hunua Ranges (e.g., Mataitai Forest), but it may be also present in some of the forest fragments around and north of Clevedon, Auckland, New Zealand. Mecodema scitulum is a nocturnal predator on the forest floor and preys on a range of different invertebrates (e.g., worms, caterpillars, etc.).
