= Orere =

Orere may refer to:

- Ōrere Point, a settlement on the Hauraki Gulf
- Orere Point Regional Park, a regional park in the Auckland Region
- Ōrere River, a river that flows from the Hunua Ranges to the Firth of Thames
