= Clevedon, New Zealand =

Clevedon
- Town
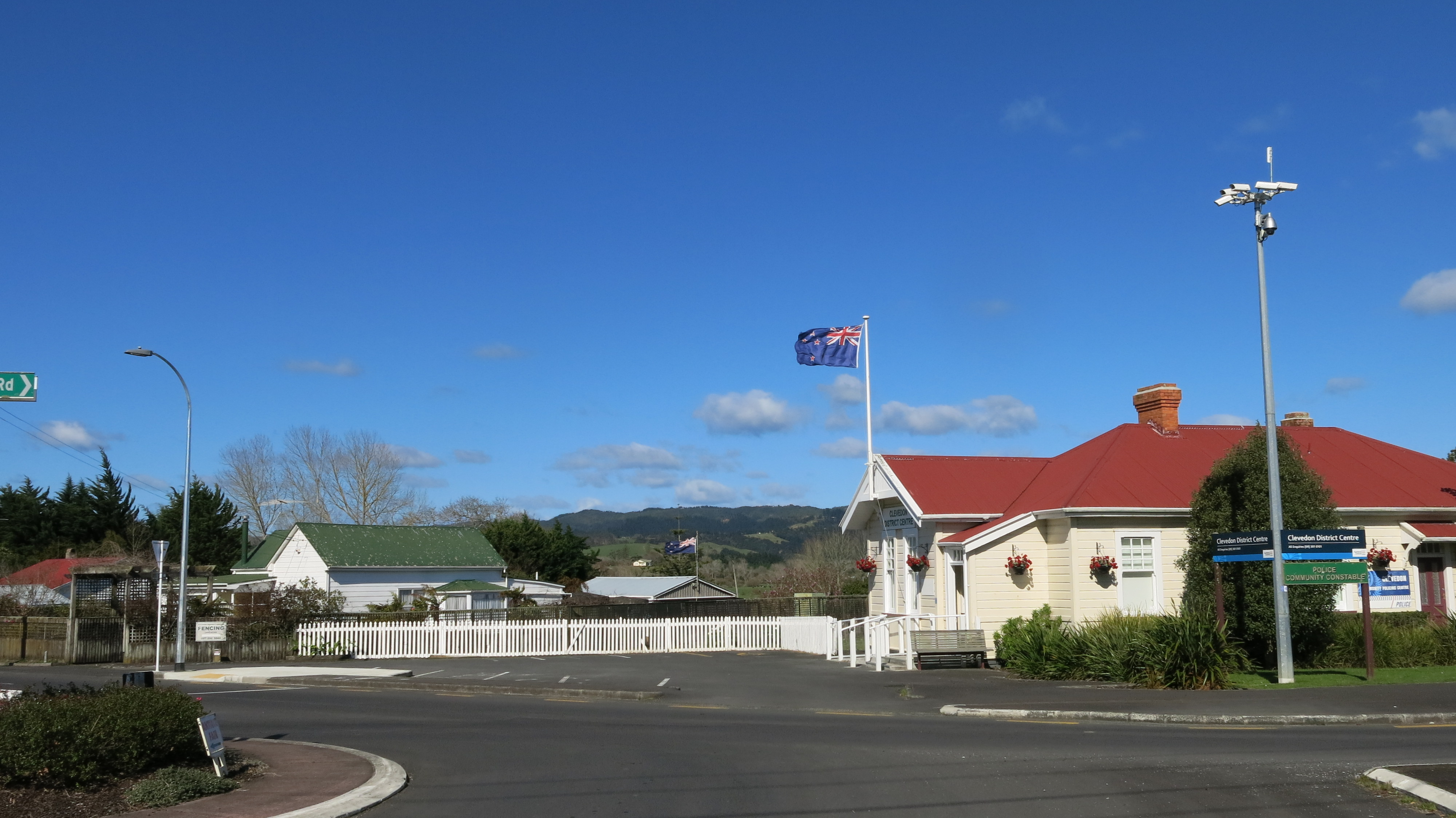
- Clevedon District Centre building
- Interactive map of Clevedon
- Coordinates: 36.991°S 175.038°E
- Country: New Zealand
- Region: Auckland Region
- Ward: Franklin ward
- Board: Franklin Local Board
- Electorates: Papakura; Hauraki-Waikato

Government
  - Territorial authority: Auckland Council
  - Mayor of Auckland: Wayne Brown
  - Papakura MP: Vacant
  - Hauraki-Waikato MP: Hana-Rawhiti Maipi-Clarke

Area
  - Total: 5.32 km^{2} (2.05 sq mi)

Population (June 2025)
  - Total: 840
  - Density: 160/km^{2} (410/sq mi)
- Website: Clevedon town website

Clevedon (Māori: Te Wairoa), previously known as Wairoa South, is a rural town to the south-east of Auckland, New Zealand, in the local government area of Franklin. The area is part of the rohe of Ngāi Tai ki Tāmaki, who settled around the Wairoa River. The original township was founded in the 1850s, and was named Clevedon in 1866. Over time, it has developed into a centre for the dairy industry south-east of Auckland.

Several popular beaches are close to Clevedon, including Umupuia Beach and Kawakawa Bay. The Duder Regional Park is between these two beaches.

== Geography ==
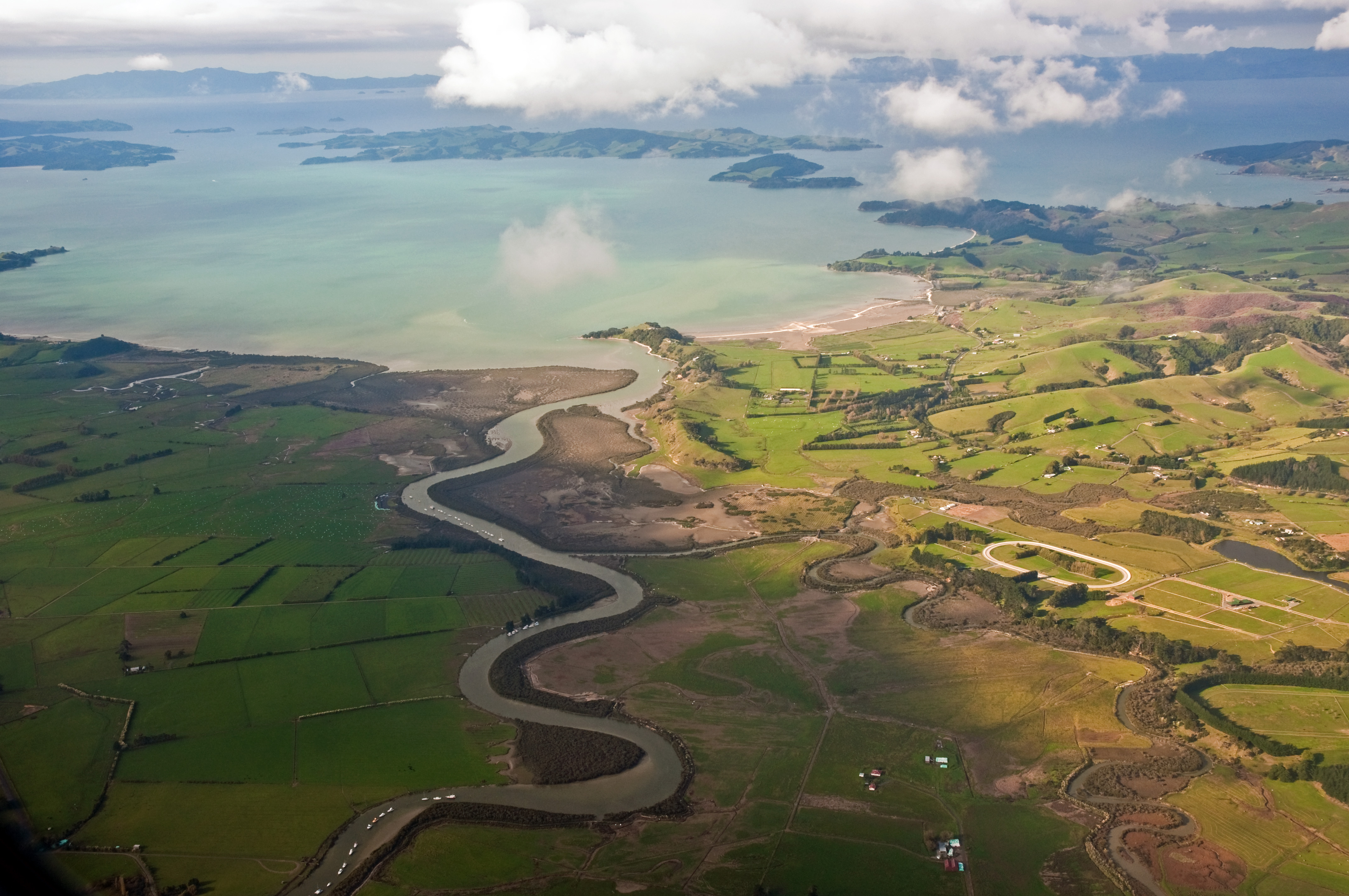
The mouth of the Wairoa River

Clevedon is located along the Wairoa River, a stream which grows into an estuarial arm of the Hauraki Gulf, at the navigable headland of the river. It is 29 kilometres (18 mi) south-east of the Auckland City Centre, and 14 kilometres (8.7 mi) from the Manukau Central. To the south-east of Clevedon rise the rugged hills of the Hunua Ranges.

Prior to human settlement, the area was swampland, and Bush moa, Mantell's moa and North Island giant moa bones have been found in the vicinity.

== History ==
=== Māori settlement ===
The area was visited by the Tainui migratory waka around the year 1300. Tainui followers of Manawatere, who identified as Ngā Oho, decided to settle the Pōhutukawa Coast and the Wairoa River. Ngāi Tai ki Tāmaki traditional stories talk about the land already being occupied by the supernatural Tūrehu people, and many place names in the area reference Tūrehu figures, such as Hinerangi and Manawatere. The Wairoa River's traditional name, Te Wairoa ("The Great River") was named by early Ngāi Tai ki Tāmaki ancestors of the Tainui waka, referencing Te Vairoa in Rarotonga, which in turn took its name from a similarly named river in Tahiti. Te Wairoa was a name applying to the river mouth and surrounding area, while Ōtau referred to the areas further upstream, including around Clevedon.

The early Tāmaki Māori hapū of the Wairoa river valley between the 14th and 16th centuries included Te Ngungukauri, Te Uri Kupai, Ngāti Ruangaingai and Ngāti Parahanga, who identified as both Ngāti Tai Manawaiti, and Ngā Iwi (Waiohua). The related hapū were united under the rangatira Te Wana in the early 18th century, under the name Ngāti Tai (now more widely known as Ngāi Tai ki Tāmaki). The river mouth formed the traditional heartland of Ngāi Tai ki Tāmaki. Ngāi Tai peoples traditionally lived in seasonal cycles, focusing on fishing and shellfish collecting, cultivations and collecting berries and snaring birds in the river's upper reaches, depending on the season. The river-mouth was used as a summer pioke (Shortspine spurdog shark) fishing ground, which were dried for the winter months. Ngāi Tai settled at many pā and kāinga along the river, especially at the river's mouth.

Ngā Tai settlements in the area include Ōtau and Tuawa near modern-day Clevedon, Tararua near the mouth of the Rautawhiti Stream, and at Takatekauere, Te Totara, Te Ruato and Pehuwai on the western side of Te Wairoa River. Between the 1830s and 1863, the Te Hingawaka hapū of Ngāti Pāoa lived at the base of Te Oue pā, north-west of the Wairoa River mouth.

When William Thomas Fairburn visited the area in 1833, it was mostly unoccupied due to the events of the Musket Wars, as most members of Ngāi Tai had fled to temporary refuge in the Waikato. In 1836, Fairburn purchased 40,000 acres between Ōtāhuhu and Umupuia (Duders Beach), including much of the catchment of the Wairoa River. Fairburn's Purchase was investigated by the New Zealand Land Commission in 1841 and 1842 and found to be excessive and reduced in size. The disallowed parts of his purchase were not returned to Ngāi Tai, however in 1854 a reserve was created for Ngāi Tai around Umupuia.

=== European settlement ===
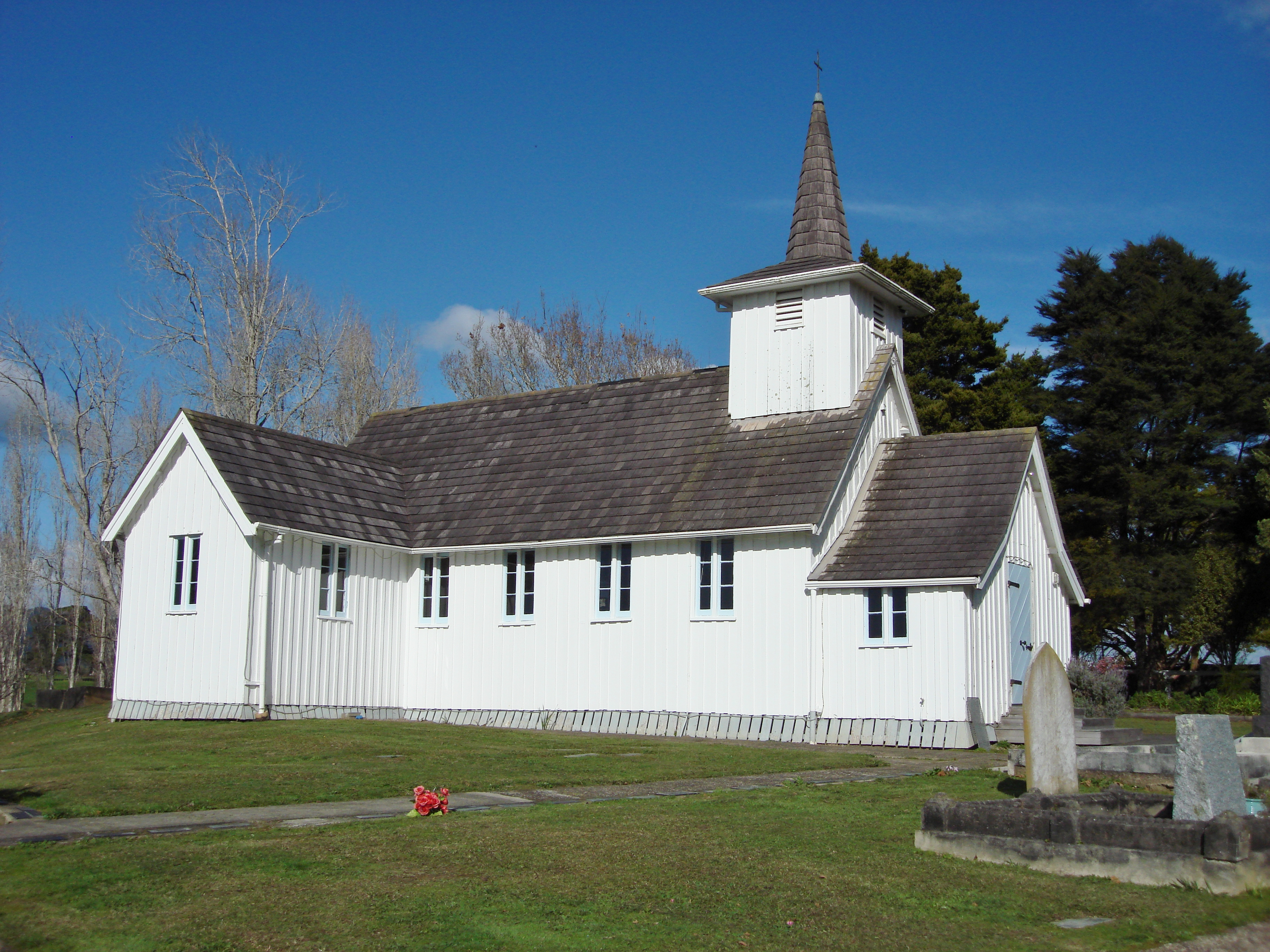
All Souls Church

The first settlers in the area were D. McNicol and Mr G. Hoye, who purchased 1,100 acres on the eastern banks of the Wairoa River, and settled with their families circa 1852. They were joined by other early settlers within the next few years, and a community called Wairoa was established around the navigable headland of the Wairoa River. Early settlers cleared native bush for farming, worked flax mills in swampy areas, and harvested kauri logs, which were transported to Auckland to be processed. Ngāi Tai held a defended settlement on the eastern banks of the Wairoa River opposite the new settlement, known as Ōtau. During the first decade post European settlement, Ngāi Tai and the European settlers had cordial relations, trading goods and assisting each other. In September 1863 during the Invasion of the Waikato, Ōtau was attacked by the British army, and the village was evacuated. After which, the residents moved to live in communities at the river's mouth. For the remainder of the war, Ngāi Tai were designated as a "friendly" people by the Crown, and remained neutral in the fighting. During the war, military blockades were placed on either side of the Wairoa River, including the Galloway Redoubt. After the Native Lands Act of 1865, the Native Land Court individuated the collective Ngāi Tai lands, and in the process the majority of land near the Wairoa River was alienated and sold to European farmers. During European settlement, most of the Wairoa River catchment was deforested.

The first bridge across the Wairoa River was constructed by the early 1860s from timber. In 1865, 150 new immigrants from Scotland on board the Viola arrived at Wairoa, settling around the former Ōtau kāinga. The allotments were not sufficient to sustain a village, and the immigrants gradually moved away or closer to the settlement near the Wairoa Bridge. In 1866, the settlement changed its name to Clevedon. The name was chosen by local residents C.W. Stephens and Le Gally, named after the town of Clevedon in Somerset, England, where Le Gally . Many of the early settlers were Scottish, and had difficulties adopting the name. All Souls Church, built in the Selwyn style and located in Clevedon, is registered by Heritage New Zealand as a Category II structure, with registration number 682. Dairy farming became the major industry in Clevedon until the 1900s.

== Demographics ==
Statistics New Zealand describes Clevedon as a rural settlement. It covers 5.32 km^{2} (2.05 sq mi) and had an estimated population of 840 as of June 2025, with a population density of 158 people per km^{2}. Clevedon settlement is part of the larger Clevedon statistical area.

Historical population for Clevedon settlement
Year	Pop.	±% p.a.
2006	561	—
2013	465	−2.65%
2018	504	+1.62%
2023	576	+2.71%
The 2006 population is for a larger area of 10.03 km^{2}. Source:

Clevedon had a population of 576 in the 2023 New Zealand census, an increase of 72 people (14.3%) since the 2018 census, and an increase of 111 people (23.9%) since the 2013 census. There were 279 males and 294 females in 204 dwellings. 3.6% of people identified as LGBTIQ+. The median age was 39.7 years (compared with 38.1 years nationally). There were 117 people (20.3%) aged under 15 years, 99 (17.2%) aged 15 to 29, 279 (48.4%) aged 30 to 64, and 78 (13.5%) aged 65 or older.

People could identify as more than one ethnicity. The results were 91.1% European (Pākehā); 11.5% Māori; 6.2% Pasifika; 4.7% Asian; 0.5% Middle Eastern, Latin American and African New Zealanders (MELAA); and 2.1% other, which includes people giving their ethnicity as "New Zealander". English was spoken by 97.4%, Māori language by 2.1%, Samoan by 0.5%, and other languages by 8.9%. No language could be spoken by 2.1% (e.g. too young to talk). The percentage of people born overseas was 20.8, compared with 28.8% nationally.

Religious affiliations were 35.9% Christian, 1.0% Hindu, 0.5% Māori religious beliefs, 0.5% Buddhist, 0.5% New Age, and 0.5% Jewish. People who answered that they had no religion were 54.2%, and 6.2% of people did not answer the census question.

Of those at least 15 years old, 162 (35.3%) people had a bachelor's or higher degree, 219 (47.7%) had a post-high school certificate or diploma, and 72 (15.7%) people exclusively held high school qualifications. The median income was $60,900, compared with $41,500 nationally. 123 people (26.8%) earned over $100,000 compared to 12.1% nationally. The employment status of those at least 15 was that 258 (56.2%) people were employed full-time, 75 (16.3%) were part-time, and 9 (2.0%) were unemployed.

=== Clevedon statistical area ===
Clevedon statistical area covers 48.67 km^{2} (18.79 sq mi) and had an estimated population of 1,830 as of June 2025, with a population density of 38 people per km^{2}.

Historical population for the statistical area
Year	Pop.	±% p.a.
2006	1,344	—
2013	1,428	+0.87%
2018	1,497	+0.95%
2023	1,581	+1.10%
The 2006 population is for a larger area of 49.97 km^{2}. Source:

Clevedon had a population of 1,581 in the 2023 New Zealand census, an increase of 84 people (5.6%) since the 2018 census, and an increase of 153 people (10.7%) since the 2013 census. There were 795 males and 786 females in 570 dwellings. 2.3% of people identified as LGBTIQ+. The median age was 44.7 years (compared with 38.1 years nationally). There were 270 people (17.1%) aged under 15 years, 276 (17.5%) aged 15 to 29, 780 (49.3%) aged 30 to 64, and 252 (15.9%) aged 65 or older.

People could identify as more than one ethnicity. The results were 91.8% European (Pākehā); 10.6% Māori; 3.4% Pasifika; 4.2% Asian; 0.8% Middle Eastern, Latin American and African New Zealanders (MELAA); and 1.9% other, which includes people giving their ethnicity as "New Zealander". English was spoken by 98.5%, Māori language by 2.1%, Samoan by 0.2%, and other languages by 8.3%. No language could be spoken by 1.1% (e.g. too young to talk). New Zealand Sign Language was known by 0.4%. The percentage of people born overseas was 21.6, compared with 28.8% nationally.

Religious affiliations were 34.0% Christian, 1.1% Hindu, 0.2% Islam, 0.4% Māori religious beliefs, 0.6% Buddhist, 0.6% New Age, 0.4% Jewish, and 0.9% other religions. People who answered that they had no religion were 56.9%, and 5.3% of people did not answer the census question.

Of those at least 15 years old, 414 (31.6%) people had a bachelor's or higher degree, 663 (50.6%) had a post-high school certificate or diploma, and 234 (17.8%) people exclusively held high school qualifications. The median income was $58,500, compared with $41,500 nationally. 333 people (25.4%) earned over $100,000 compared to 12.1% nationally. The employment status of those at least 15 was that 735 (56.1%) people were employed full-time, 210 (16.0%) were part-time, and 18 (1.4%) were unemployed.

== Notable places ==
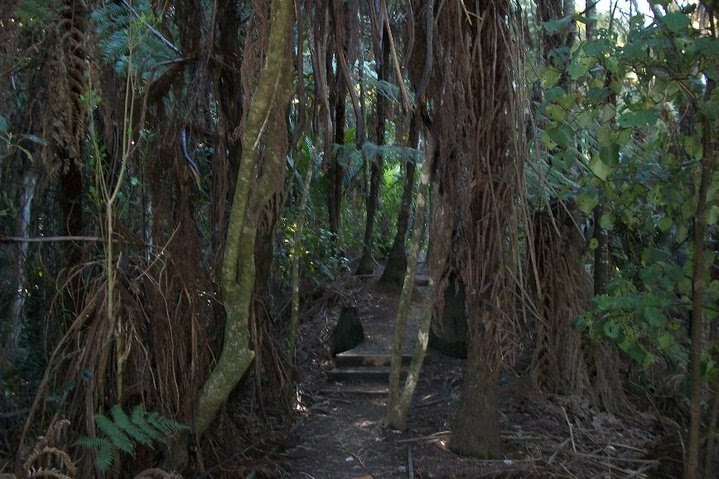
Clevedon Scenic Reserve takes 45 minutes to get to the top of a small hill with a view towards both coasts

Clevedon Scenic Reserve is a 100 ha (250 acres) nature reserve that was established in 1930, formerly a part of William Thorp's farm. The reserve includes native bush such as pūriri, tōtara and taraire, a wetland, a quarry that was abandoned in 1957, and a viewpoint at the top of a 225 m (738 ft) hill.

The McNicol Homestead is the former home of the McNicol family that was built in 1878. Currently it is leased as a museum by the Clevedon Historical Society.

The Paton Homestead was built c.1870 for the Paton family, who were early settlers of Clevedon.

The Clevedon Post Office was built in 1909 and is a landmark for the town.

All Souls Church was built in 1861 and was opened by Bishop Selwyn.

== Education ==
Clevedon School is a coeducational full primary school (years 1–8) with a roll of 369 as of July 2026. The school began in 1859 as Wairoa School and moved to its current site in 1878. In 1895 it became Clevedon School.

== Local government ==
The first local government in the area was the Wairoa Highway District, established in 1862, and was absorbed into the Manukau County in 1918. Clevedon became a part of Manukau City in 1965, and in November 2010, all cities and districts of the Auckland Region were amalgamated into a single body, governed by the Auckland Council.

Clevedon is part of the Franklin local board area, who elects members of the Franklin Local Board. Residents of Clevedon also elect the Franklin ward councillor, who sits on the Auckland Council.

== Notable people ==
- Phil Goff, politician and Auckland mayor
- Charlotte Le Gallais, nurse
