= Duripelta hunua =

Conservation status
- Data Deficit (NZ TCS)

Scientific classification
- Kingdom: Animalia
- Phylum: Arthropoda
- Subphylum: Chelicerata
- Class: Arachnida
- Order: Araneae
- Infraorder: Araneomorphae
- Family: Orsolobidae
- Genus: Duripelta
- Species: D. hunua

Binomial name
- Duripelta hunua Forster & Platnick, 1985

Species of spider

Duripelta hunua is a species of Orsolobidae spider. The species is endemic to New Zealand.

== Taxonomy ==
This species was described in 1985 by Ray Forster and Norman Platnick from male and female specimens collected in the Auckland region. The holotype is stored in the New Zealand Arthropod Collection under registration number NZAC03014994.

== Description ==
The male is recorded at 1.63 mm (0.064 in) whereas the female is 1.84 mm (0.072 in). The abdomen has a chevron pattern dorsally.

== Distribution ==
This species is only known from the Hunua Ranges near Auckland, New Zealand.

== Conservation status ==
Under the New Zealand Threat Classification System, this species is listed as "Data Deficient" with the qualifiers of "Data Poor: Size", "Data Poor: Trend" and "One Location".
