= Duripelta watti =

Conservation status
- Naturally Uncommon (NZ TCS)

Scientific classification
- Kingdom: Animalia
- Phylum: Arthropoda
- Subphylum: Chelicerata
- Class: Arachnida
- Order: Araneae
- Infraorder: Araneomorphae
- Family: Orsolobidae
- Genus: Duripelta
- Species: D. watti

Binomial name
- Duripelta watti Forster & Platnick, 1985

Species of spider

Duripelta watti is a species of Orsolobidae spider. The species is endemic to New Zealand.

== Taxonomy ==
This species was described in 1985 by Ray Forster and Norman Platnick from male and female specimens collected in Wellington. The holotype is stored in the New Zealand Arthropod Collection under registration number NZAC03014998.

== Description ==
The male is recorded at 1.74 mm (0.069 in) in length whereas the female is 2.2 mm (0.087 in). This species carapace, legs and abdomen are dark brown.

== Distribution ==
This species is only known from Orongorongo Valley in Wellington, New Zealand.

== Conservation status ==
Under the New Zealand Threat Classification System, this species is listed as "Naturally Uncommon" with the qualifier "One Location".
