= Ōrere River =

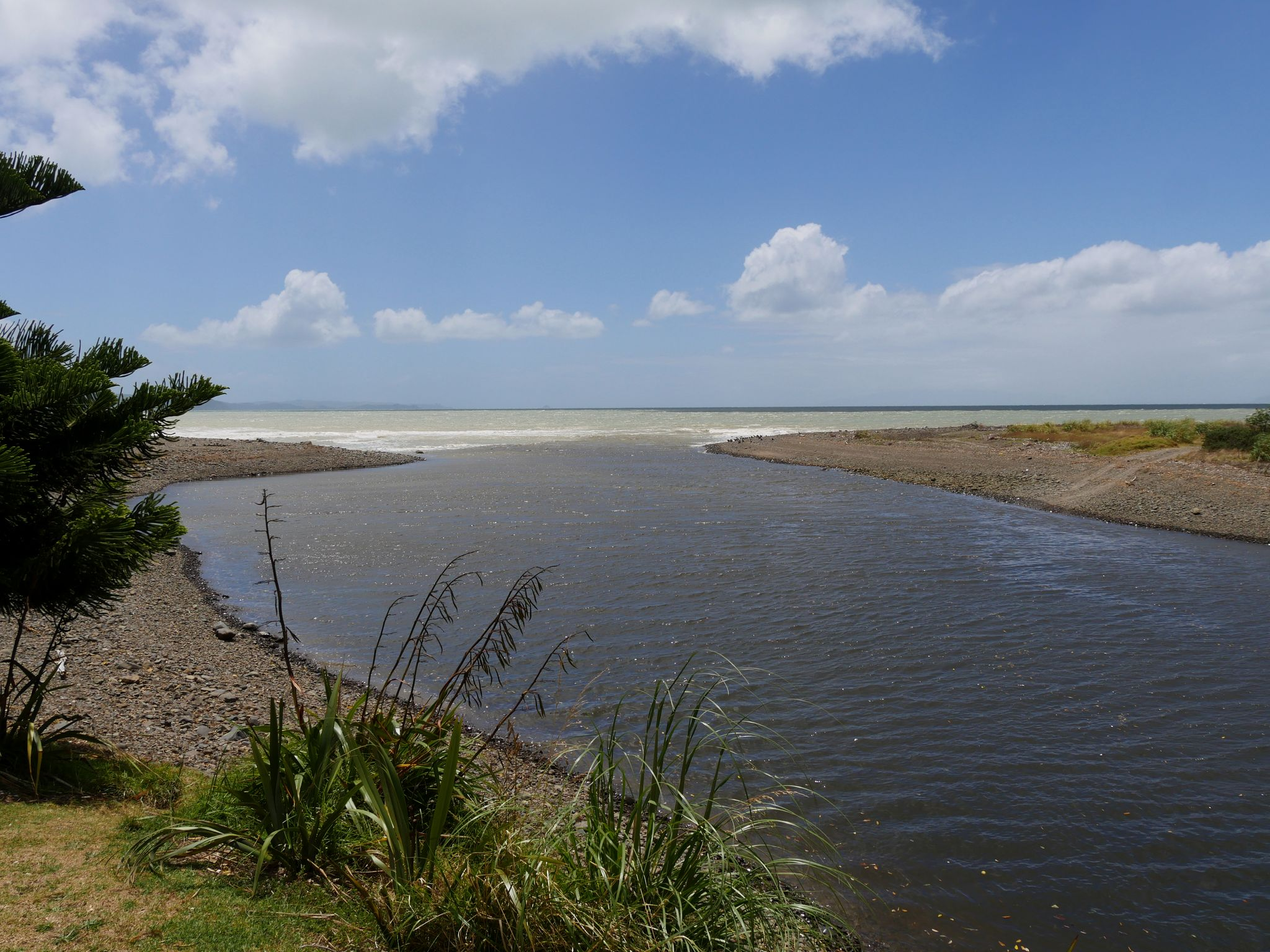
- Mouth of the Ōrere River

- Mouth of the Ōrere River Ōrere River (New Zealand)
- Route of the Ōrere River

Location
- Country: New Zealand
- Region: Auckland Region

Physical characteristics
- Source: Confluence of the Ōrere Stream and the Kiripaka Stream
  - coordinates: 36.98711°S 175.18909°E
- Mouth: Firth of Thames
  - coordinates: 36.9579°S 175.24646°E
- Length: 16 km (10 mi)

Basin features
- Progression: Ōrere River → Firth of Thames → Hauraki Gulf
- Bridges: Rowland's Bridge

The Ōrere River is a river of the Auckland Region of New Zealand's North Island. It flows generally northeast from the Hunua Ranges, reaching the Firth of Thames at Ōrere Point, close to the point where the firth widens into the Hauraki Gulf / Tīkapa Moana.

The New Zealand Ministry for Culture and Heritage gives a translation of "place of the waterfall" for Ōrere.

== Description ==
The Ōrere River is a fast-flowing shingle bed river, that drains the northern Hunua Ranges into the Hauraki Gulf / Tīkapa Moana at the entrance to the Firth of Thames.

== See also ==
- List of rivers of New Zealand
