= Kawakawa Bay =

- Rural settlement
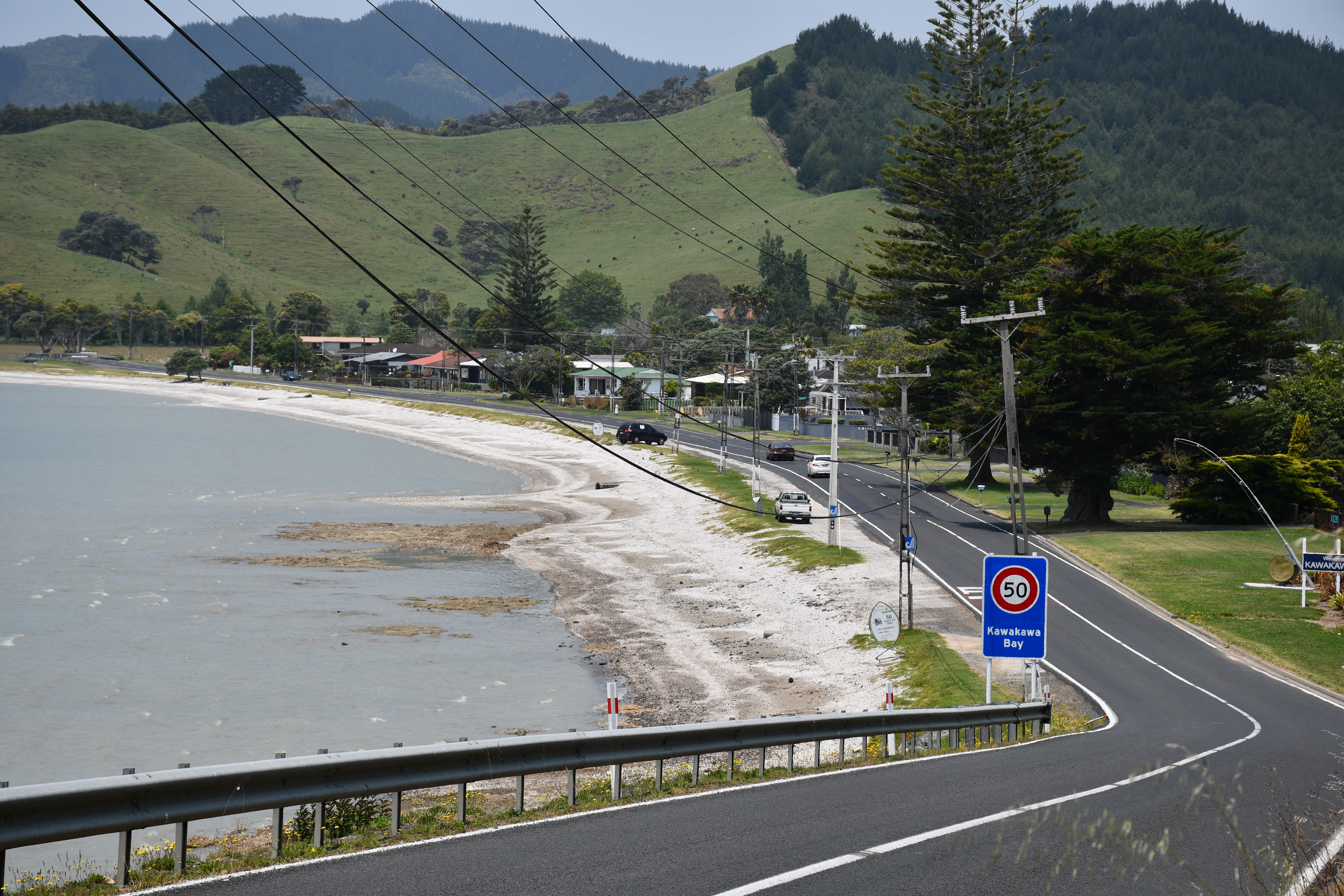
- Kawakawa Bay
- Interactive map of Kawakawa Bay
- Coordinates: 36.949°S 175.169°E
- Country: New Zealand
- Region: Auckland Region
- Ward: Franklin ward
- Board: Franklin Local Board
- Electorates: Papakura; Hauraki-Waikato

Government
  - Territorial authority: Auckland Council

Area
  - Total: 11.37 km^{2} (4.39 sq mi)

Population (June 2025)
  - Total: 610
  - Density: 54/km^{2} (140/sq mi)

Kawakawa Bay is an east coast bay and settlement in the Franklin area of New Zealand's Auckland Region.

It is located on the western side and northern end of the Firth of Thames, the southern side of the Hauraki Gulf, and north of the Hunua Ranges.

The bay takes its name from Kawakawa trees which line the coastline.

The beach is used for swimming, fishing and boating, and has views of Hauraki Gulf islands like Waiheke Island.

Tawhitokino Beach is accessible via a small boat or kayak, or a 60-minute walk.

Stoddart House was built c.1904. It would pass hands and eventually serve as an Anglican children's home.

== Demographics ==
Kawakawa Bay is defined by Statistics New Zealand as a rural settlement. It covers 11.37 km^{2} (4.39 sq mi) and had an estimated population of 610 as of June 2025, with a population density of 54 people per km^{2}. It is part of the larger Kawakawa Bay-Orere statistical area.

Historical population for Kawakawa Bay
| Year | Pop. | ±% p.a. |
|---|---|---|
| 2006 | 585 | — |
| 2013 | 600 | +0.36% |
| 2018 | 669 | +2.20% |
| 2023 | 603 | −2.06% |

Kawakawa Bay had a population of 603 in the 2023 New Zealand census, a decrease of 66 people (−9.9%) since the 2018 census, and an increase of 3 people (0.5%) since the 2013 census. There were 288 males, 315 females and 3 people of other genders in 249 dwellings. 2.0% of people identified as LGBTIQ+. The median age was 51.1 years (compared with 38.1 years nationally). There were 84 people (13.9%) aged under 15 years, 87 (14.4%) aged 15 to 29, 288 (47.8%) aged 30 to 64, and 144 (23.9%) aged 65 or older.

People could identify as more than one ethnicity. The results were 90.5% European (Pākehā); 20.4% Māori; 5.5% Pasifika; 2.5% Asian; 0.5% Middle Eastern, Latin American and African New Zealanders (MELAA); and 2.0% other, which includes people giving their ethnicity as "New Zealander". English was spoken by 99.5%, Māori language by 3.0%, and other languages by 4.0%. No language could be spoken by 0.5% (e.g. too young to talk). The percentage of people born overseas was 13.9, compared with 28.8% nationally.

Religious affiliations were 26.4% Christian, 1.0% Hindu, 0.5% New Age, and 1.0% other religions. People who answered that they had no religion were 63.2%, and 8.0% of people did not answer the census question.

Of those at least 15 years old, 84 (16.2%) people had a bachelor's or higher degree, 288 (55.5%) had a post-high school certificate or diploma, and 144 (27.7%) people exclusively held high school qualifications. The median income was $42,600, compared with $41,500 nationally. 78 people (15.0%) earned over $100,000 compared to 12.1% nationally. The employment status of those at least 15 was that 276 (53.2%) people were employed full-time, 78 (15.0%) were part-time, and 9 (1.7%) were unemployed.

=== Kawakawa Bay-Orere ===
Kawakawa Bay-Orere statistical area, which also includes Ōrere Point, covers 210.06 km^{2} (81.10 sq mi) and had an estimated population of 2,030 as of June 2025, with a population density of 9.7 people per km^{2}.

Historical population for Kawakawa Bay-Orere
| Year | Pop. | ±% p.a. |
|---|---|---|
| 2006 | 1,746 | — |
| 2013 | 1,761 | +0.12% |
| 2018 | 2,016 | +2.74% |
| 2023 | 2,001 | −0.15% |
The 2006 population is for a smaller area of 208.78 km^{2}. Source:

Kawakawa Bay-Orere had a population of 2,001 in the 2023 New Zealand census, a decrease of 15 people (−0.7%) since the 2018 census, and an increase of 240 people (13.6%) since the 2013 census. There were 1,002 males, 999 females and 6 people of other genders in 813 dwellings. 2.2% of people identified as LGBTIQ+. The median age was 49.4 years (compared with 38.1 years nationally). There were 318 people (15.9%) aged under 15 years, 273 (13.6%) aged 15 to 29, 966 (48.3%) aged 30 to 64, and 447 (22.3%) aged 65 or older.

People could identify as more than one ethnicity. The results were 90.9% European (Pākehā); 18.3% Māori; 4.9% Pasifika; 2.8% Asian; 0.1% Middle Eastern, Latin American and African New Zealanders (MELAA); and 1.9% other, which includes people giving their ethnicity as "New Zealander". English was spoken by 98.8%, Māori language by 3.4%, Samoan by 0.1%, and other languages by 6.1%. No language could be spoken by 1.2% (e.g. too young to talk). New Zealand Sign Language was known by 0.3%. The percentage of people born overseas was 16.2, compared with 28.8% nationally.

Religious affiliations were 32.4% Christian, 0.6% Hindu, 0.7% Islam, 0.4% Māori religious beliefs, 0.3% Buddhist, 0.4% New Age, and 0.9% other religions. People who answered that they had no religion were 57.1%, and 7.2% of people did not answer the census question.

Of those at least 15 years old, 363 (21.6%) people had a bachelor's or higher degree, 918 (54.5%) had a post-high school certificate or diploma, and 405 (24.1%) people exclusively held high school qualifications. The median income was $43,000, compared with $41,500 nationally. 258 people (15.3%) earned over $100,000 compared to 12.1% nationally. The employment status of those at least 15 was that 849 (50.4%) people were employed full-time, 273 (16.2%) were part-time, and 39 (2.3%) were unemployed.
