= Duripelta pallida =

Conservation status
- Not Threatened (NZ TCS)

Scientific classification
- Kingdom: Animalia
- Phylum: Arthropoda
- Subphylum: Chelicerata
- Class: Arachnida
- Order: Araneae
- Infraorder: Araneomorphae
- Family: Orsolobidae
- Genus: Duripelta
- Species: D. pallida

Binomial name
- Duripelta pallida (Forster, 1956)

Synonyms
- Ascuta pallida

Species of spider

Duripelta pallida is a species of Orsolobidae spider. The species is endemic to New Zealand.

== Taxonomy ==
This species was described as "Ascuta pallida" in 1956 by Ray Forster from male and female specimens collected in Fiordland. In 1985, the species was made the type species of Duripelta. The holotype is stored in Canterbury Museum.

== Description ==
The male is 1.3 mm (0.051 in) in length whereas the female is 1.4 mm (0.055 in). This species has a reddish brown carapace, pale yellow-brown legs and a silvery white abdomen.

== Distribution ==
This species is only known from Fiordland, New Zealand.

== Conservation status ==
Under the New Zealand Threat Classification System, this species is listed as "Not Threatened".
