= Duripelta alta =

Conservation status
- Data Deficit (NZ TCS)

Scientific classification
- Kingdom: Animalia
- Phylum: Arthropoda
- Subphylum: Chelicerata
- Class: Arachnida
- Order: Araneae
- Infraorder: Araneomorphae
- Family: Orsolobidae
- Genus: Duripelta
- Species: D. alta

Binomial name
- Duripelta alta Forster & Platnick, 1985

Species of spider

Duripelta alta is a species of orsolobidae. The species is endemic to New Zealand.

== Taxonomy ==
This species was described in 1985 by Ray Forster and Norman Platnick from male and female specimens collected in Fiordland. The holotype is stored in the New Zealand Arthropod Collection under registration number NZAC03014993.

== Description ==
The male and female is recorded at 1.80 mm (0.071 in) in length. The cephalothorax and legs are pale yellowish brown. The abdomen is creamy white.

== Distribution ==
This species is only known from Fiordland, New Zealand.

== Conservation status ==
Under the New Zealand Threat Classification System, this species is listed as "Data Deficient" with the qualifiers of "Data Poor: Size", "Data Poor: Trend" and "One Location".
