= Duripelta townsendi =

Conservation status
- Not Threatened (NZ TCS)

Scientific classification
- Kingdom: Animalia
- Phylum: Arthropoda
- Subphylum: Chelicerata
- Class: Arachnida
- Order: Araneae
- Infraorder: Araneomorphae
- Family: Orsolobidae
- Genus: Duripelta
- Species: D. townsendi

Binomial name
- Duripelta townsendi Forster & Platnick, 1985

Species of spider

Duripelta townsendi is a species of Orsolobidae spider. The species is endemic to New Zealand.

== Taxonomy ==
This species was described in 1985 by Ray Forster and Norman Platnick from male and female specimens collected on Dun Mountain. The holotype is stored in the New Zealand Arthropod Collection under registration number NZAC03014997.

== Description ==
The male is recorded at 1.92 mm (0.076 in) in length whereas the female is 2mm.

== Distribution ==
This species is known from Nelson and Marlborough in New Zealand.

== Conservation status ==
Under the New Zealand Threat Classification System, this species is listed as "Not Threatened".
