= Duripelta totara =

Conservation status
- Data Deficit (NZ TCS)

Scientific classification
- Kingdom: Animalia
- Phylum: Arthropoda
- Subphylum: Chelicerata
- Class: Arachnida
- Order: Araneae
- Infraorder: Araneomorphae
- Family: Orsolobidae
- Genus: Duripelta
- Species: D. totara

Binomial name
- Duripelta totara Forster & Platnick, 1985

Species of spider

Duripelta totara is a species of Orsolobidae. The species is endemic to New Zealand.

== Taxonomy ==
This species was described in 1985 by Ray Forster and Norman Platnick from female specimens collected in Rangitikei. The holotype is stored in Otago Museum.

== Description ==
The female is recorded at 1.72 mm (0.068 in) in length. This species has a pale yellow carapace and legs. The abdomen is creamy white.

== Distribution ==
This species is only known from Pohangina Valley in Rangitikei, New Zealand.

== Conservation status ==
Under the New Zealand Threat Classification System, this species is listed as "Data Deficient" with the qualifiers of "Data Poor: Size", "Data Poor: Trend" and "One Location".
