= Duripelta scuta =

Conservation status
- Data Deficit (NZ TCS)

Scientific classification
- Kingdom: Animalia
- Phylum: Arthropoda
- Subphylum: Chelicerata
- Class: Arachnida
- Order: Araneae
- Infraorder: Araneomorphae
- Family: Orsolobidae
- Genus: Duripelta
- Species: D. scuta

Binomial name
- Duripelta scuta Forster & Platnick, 1985

Species of spider

Duripelta scuta is a species of Orsolobidae spider. The species is endemic to New Zealand.

== Taxonomy ==
This species was described in 1985 by Ray Forster and Norman Platnick from male and female specimens collected in Nelson. The holotype is stored in the New Zealand Arthropod Collection under registration number NZAC03014996.

== Description ==
The male is recorded at 1.40 mm (0.055 in) in length whereas the female is 1.52 mm (0.060 in). This species has a pale yellowish brown carapace and legs. The abdomen is creamy white.

== Distribution ==
This species is only known from Nelson and Marlborough in New Zealand.

== Conservation status ==
Under the New Zealand Threat Classification System, this species is listed as "Data Deficient" with the qualifiers of "Data Poor: Size", "Data Poor: Trend" and "One Location".
