= Duripelta monowai =

Conservation status
- Data Deficit (NZ TCS)

Scientific classification
- Kingdom: Animalia
- Phylum: Arthropoda
- Subphylum: Chelicerata
- Class: Arachnida
- Order: Araneae
- Infraorder: Araneomorphae
- Family: Orsolobidae
- Genus: Duripelta
- Species: D. monowai

Binomial name
- Duripelta monowai Forster & Platnick, 1985

Species of spider

Duripelta monowai is a species of Orsolobidae spider. The species is endemic to New Zealand.

== Taxonomy ==
This species was described in 1985 by Ray Forster and Norman Platnick from male and female specimens collected in Southland. The holotype is stored in Otago Museum.

== Description ==
The male is recorded at 1.32 mm (0.052 in) in length whereas the female is 1.6 mm (0.063 in). The carapace and legs are pale yellow. The abdomen is creamy white.

== Distribution ==
This species is only known from Southland, New Zealand.

== Conservation status ==
Under the New Zealand Threat Classification System, this species is listed as "Data Deficient" with the qualifiers of "Data Poor: Size", "Data Poor: Trend" and "One Location".
