= Duripelta paringa =

Conservation status
- Not Threatened (NZ TCS)

Scientific classification
- Kingdom: Animalia
- Phylum: Arthropoda
- Subphylum: Chelicerata
- Class: Arachnida
- Order: Araneae
- Infraorder: Araneomorphae
- Family: Orsolobidae
- Genus: Duripelta
- Species: D. paringa

Binomial name
- Duripelta paringa Forster & Platnick, 1985

Species of spider

Duripelta paringa is a species of Orsolobidae spider. The species is endemic to New Zealand.

== Taxonomy ==
This species was described in 1985 by Ray Forster and Norman Platnick from male and female specimens collected in Westland. The holotype is stored in Otago Museum.

== Description ==
The male is recorded at 1.68 mm (0.066 in) in length, whereas the female is 2.12 mm (0.083 in). This species has markings on the dorsal surface of the abdomen.

== Distribution ==
This species is only known from Westland, New Zealand.

== Conservation status ==
Under the New Zealand Threat Classification System, this species is listed as "Not Threatened".
