= Duripelta australis =

Conservation status
- Data Deficit (NZ TCS)

Scientific classification
- Kingdom: Animalia
- Phylum: Arthropoda
- Subphylum: Chelicerata
- Class: Arachnida
- Order: Araneae
- Infraorder: Araneomorphae
- Family: Orsolobidae
- Genus: Duripelta
- Species: D. australis

Binomial name
- Duripelta australis Forster, 1956

Species of spider

Duripelta australis is a species of Orsolobidae spider. The species is endemic to New Zealand.

== Taxonomy ==
This species was described in 1956 by Ray Forster from male and female specimens collected in the South Island of New Zealand. The holotype is stored in Canterbury Museum.

== Description ==
The male is recorded at 1.8 mm (0.071 in) in length whereas the female is 1.9 mm (0.075 in). The carapace is reddish brown and the abdomen is blackish brown with chevron patterns dorsally.

== Distribution ==
This species is only know from the South Island of New Zealand.

== Conservation status ==
Under the New Zealand Threat Classification System, this species is listed as "Data Deficient" with the qualifiers of "Data Poor: Size", "Data Poor: Trend" and "One Location".
