= Duripelta mawhero =

Conservation status
- Not Threatened (NZ TCS)

Scientific classification
- Kingdom: Animalia
- Phylum: Arthropoda
- Subphylum: Chelicerata
- Class: Arachnida
- Order: Araneae
- Infraorder: Araneomorphae
- Family: Orsolobidae
- Genus: Duripelta
- Species: D. mawhero

Binomial name
- Duripelta mawhero Forster & Platnick, 1985

Species of spider

Duripelta mawhero is a species of Orsolobidae spider. The species is endemic to New Zealand.

== Taxonomy ==
This species was described in 1985 by Ray Forster and Norman Platnick from male and female specimens collected in Nelson and Marlborough. The holotype is stored at the New Zealand Arthropod Collection under registration number NZAC03014995.

== Description ==
The male is recorded at 2.36 mm (0.093 in) in length whereas the female is 2.16 mm (0.085 in).

== Distribution ==
This species is only known from Nelson and Marlborough in New Zealand.

== Conservation status ==
Under the New Zealand Threat Classification System, this species is listed as "Not Threatened".
