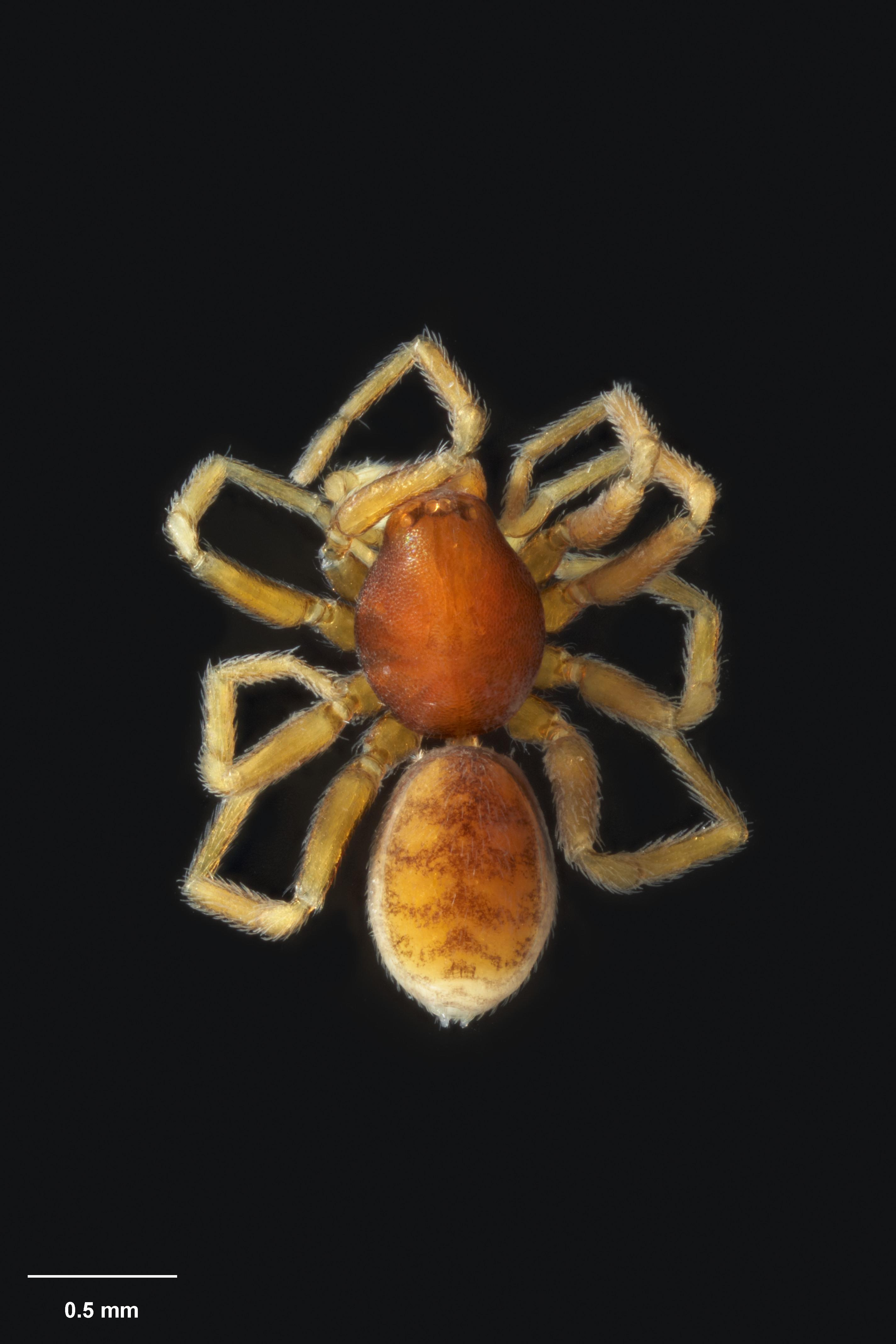

Conservation status
- Not Threatened (NZ TCS)

Scientific classification
- Kingdom: Animalia
- Phylum: Arthropoda
- Subphylum: Chelicerata
- Class: Arachnida
- Order: Araneae
- Infraorder: Araneomorphae
- Family: Orsolobidae
- Genus: Duripelta
- Species: D. borealis

Binomial name
- Duripelta borealis Forster, 1956

= Duripelta borealis =

Species of spider

Duripelta borealis is a species of Orsolobidae. The species is endemic to New Zealand.

== Taxonomy ==
This species was described in 1956 by Ray Forster from male and female specimens collected throughout New Zealand. The holotype is stored in Te Papa Museum under registration number AS.000013.

== Description ==
The male is recorded at 1.5 mm (0.059 in) in length. The carapace is dark reddish brown, whilst the legs are paler. The abdomen is creamy coloured with black chevrons dorsally. In contrast, the female is 1.8mm long and has reddish brown chevrons.

== Distribution ==
This species is known from throughout the North Island and the top of the South Island of New Zealand.

== Conservation status ==
Under the New Zealand Threat Classification System, this species is listed as "Not Threatened".
