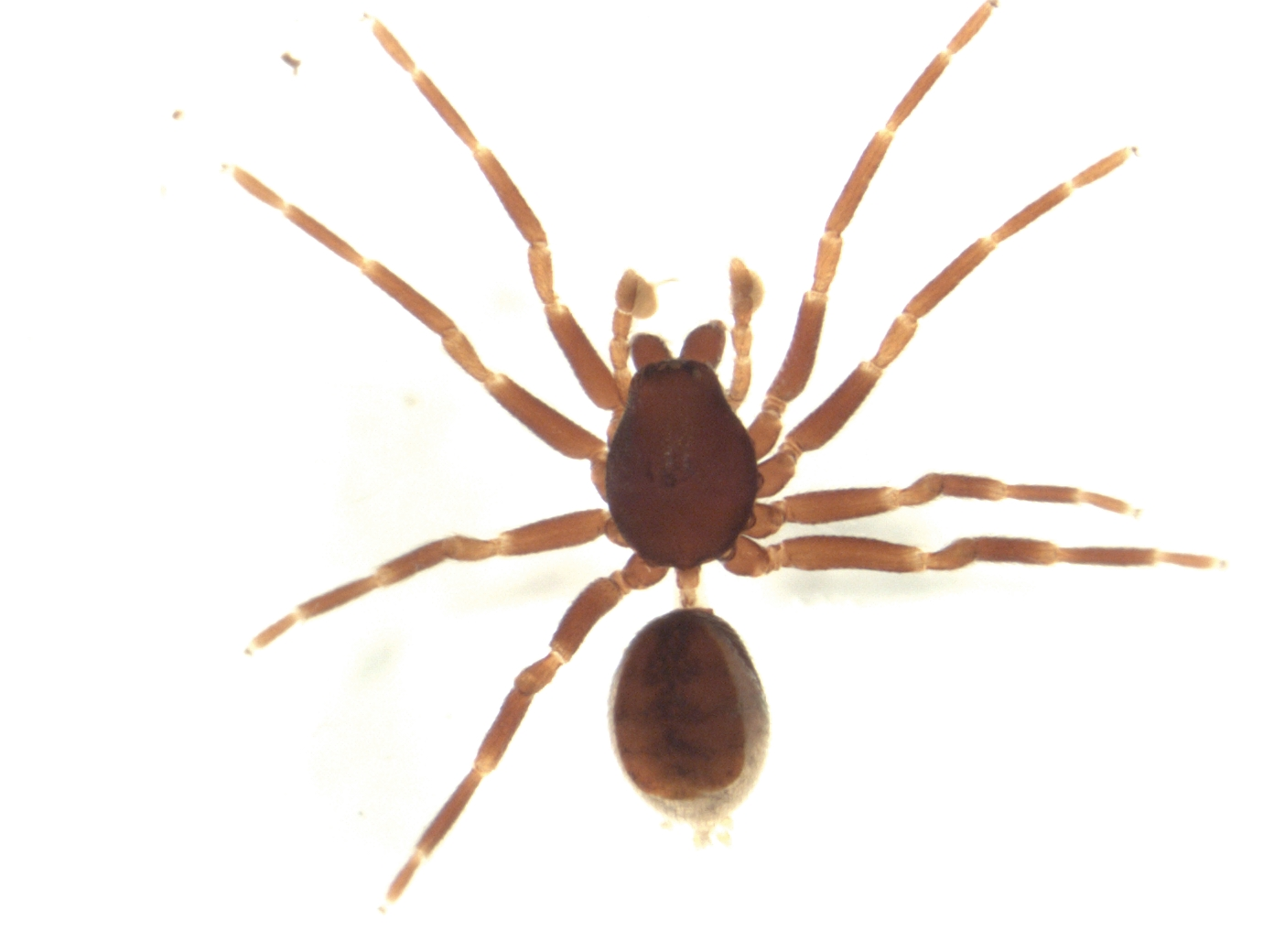
- Duripelta sp., male

Scientific classification
- Kingdom: Animalia
- Phylum: Arthropoda
- Subphylum: Chelicerata
- Class: Arachnida
- Order: Araneae
- Infraorder: Araneomorphae
- Family: Orsolobidae
- Genus: Duripelta; Forster, 1956

Type species
- D. borealis Forster, 1956

Species
- 17, see text

= Duripelta =

Genus of spiders

Duripelta is a genus of Polynesian araneomorph spiders in the family Orsolobidae, and was first described by Raymond Robert Forster in 1956.

== Species ==
As of June 2019 it contains seventeen species, found only in New Zealand:

- Duripelta alta Forster & Platnick, 1985 – New Zealand
- Duripelta australis Forster, 1956 – New Zealand
- Duripelta borealis Forster, 1956 (type) – New Zealand
- Duripelta egmont Forster & Platnick, 1985 – New Zealand
- Duripelta hunua Forster & Platnick, 1985 – New Zealand
- Duripelta koomaa Forster & Platnick, 1985 – New Zealand
- Duripelta mawhero Forster & Platnick, 1985 – New Zealand
- Duripelta minuta Forster, 1956 – New Zealand
- Duripelta monowai Forster & Platnick, 1985 – New Zealand
- Duripelta otara Forster & Platnick, 1985 – New Zealand
- Duripelta pallida (Forster, 1956) – New Zealand
- Duripelta paringa Forster & Platnick, 1985 – New Zealand
- Duripelta peha Forster & Platnick, 1985 – New Zealand
- Duripelta scuta Forster & Platnick, 1985 – New Zealand
- Duripelta totara Forster & Platnick, 1985 – New Zealand
- Duripelta townsendi Forster & Platnick, 1985 – New Zealand
- Duripelta watti Forster & Platnick, 1985 – New Zealand
