= Duripelta otara =

Conservation status
- Data Deficit (NZ TCS)

Scientific classification
- Kingdom: Animalia
- Phylum: Arthropoda
- Subphylum: Chelicerata
- Class: Arachnida
- Order: Araneae
- Infraorder: Araneomorphae
- Family: Orsolobidae
- Genus: Duripelta
- Species: D. otara

Binomial name
- Duripelta otara Forster & Platnick, 1985

Species of spider

Duripelta otara is a species of Orsolobidae spider. The species is endemic to New Zealand.

== Taxonomy ==
This species was described in 1985 by Ray Forster and Norman Platnick from male specimens collected in Otago. The holotype is stored in Otago Museum.

== Description ==
The male is recorded at 1.63 mm (0.064 in) in length. The carapace and abdomen are yellowish brown, paler in the latter.

== Distribution ==
This species is only known from Otago, New Zealand.

== Conservation status ==
Under the New Zealand Threat Classification System, this species is listed as "Data Deficient" with the qualifiers of "Data Poor: Size", "Data Poor: Trend" and "One Location".
