= Duripelta minuta =

Conservation status
- Not Threatened (NZ TCS)

Scientific classification
- Domain: Eukaryota
- Kingdom: Animalia
- Phylum: Arthropoda
- Subphylum: Chelicerata
- Class: Arachnida
- Order: Araneae
- Infraorder: Araneomorphae
- Family: Orsolobidae
- Genus: Duripelta
- Species: D. minuta

Binomial name
- Duripelta minuta Forster, 1956

Species of spider

Duripelta minuta is a species of Orsolobidae. The species is endemic to New Zealand.

== Taxonomy ==
This species was described in 1956 by Ray Forster from male and female specimens collected in Canterbury. The holotype is stored in Canterbury Museum.

== Description ==
The male is recorded at 1.4 mm (0.055 in) in length whereas the female is 1.6 mm (0.063 in). In the male, the carapace and abdomen are golden brown. In the female, the carapace is orange brown and the abdomen is creamy white.

== Distribution ==
This species is only known from Canterbury, New Zealand.

== Conservation status ==
Under the New Zealand Threat Classification System, this species is listed as "Not Threatened".
