= McNicol Homestead =

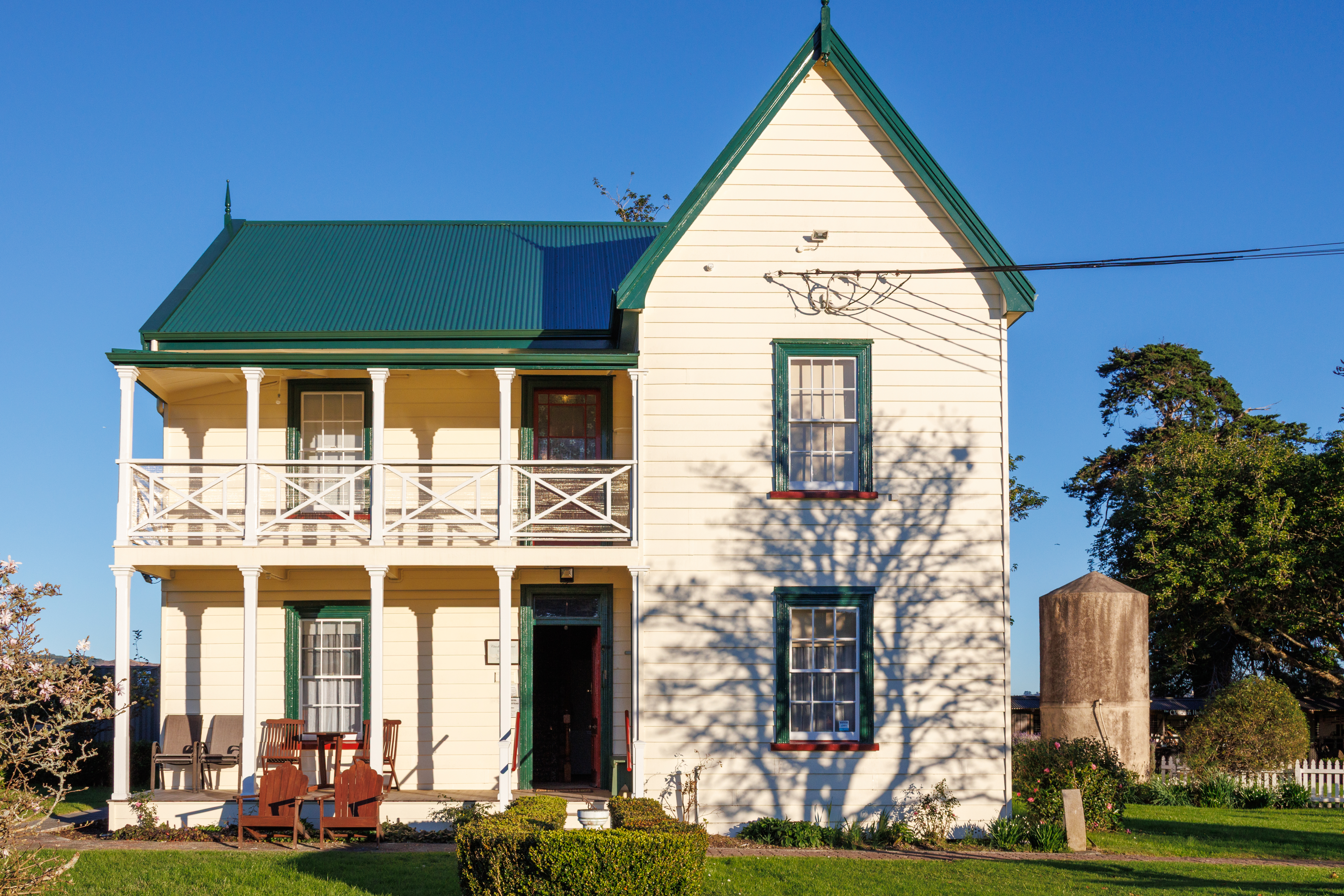
- McNicol Homestead in 2025
- Interactive map of the McNicol Homestead area
- Former names: Glenalbyn

General information
- Architectural style: Victorian
- Location: 12 McNicol Road, Clevedon, Clevedon
- Coordinates: 36°59′22″S 175°02′45″E
- Current tenants: Clevedon and Districts Historical Society
- Named for: Duncan McNicol
- Year built: 1878
- Renovated: 2024-2025
- Owner: Auckland Council

Technical details
- Grounds: 7,450 m^{2} (1.84 acres)

Heritage New Zealand – Category 2
- Designated: 4 April 1983
- Reference no.: 687

The McNicol Homestead is a historic 19th century homestead located in Clevedon that is listed as a Category II building by Heritage New Zealand.

== Description ==
The McNicol Homestead is a two-storey Victorian homestead. The property has great macrocarpas. The building was constructed from kauri that was milled onsite. A ha-ha is located in front of the house. The homestead has a brick chimney and corrugated iron roofing. There are finials at each apex of the roof. The double hung sash windows have 6x6 panes.

The homestead is a rare example of a surviving large colonial homestead.

== History ==
The homestead was constructed in 1878 for the McNicol family at a cost of £320. The McNicols came from Scotland and were the first settlers in the area. The homestead was the second house the McNicols had constructed.

Sometime between 1870–1900 a two-room timber outbuilding was constructed.

In 1973 Duncan McNicol's great-granddaughter sold the property to Bernie Ross, a Manukau City Councillor. Ross gifted the property to the Manukau City Council in 1980.

Since 1980 the homestead has been leased by the Clevedon and Districts Historical Society who operate a small museum that showcases local history and other community activities from the building.

The worker's cottage located on the property underwent restoration in 1983.

The homestead underwent restoration work beginning in July 2024, and re-opened for the public on 7 June 2025.
