= Duripelta koomaa =

Conservation status
- Data Deficit (NZ TCS)

Scientific classification
- Kingdom: Animalia
- Phylum: Arthropoda
- Subphylum: Chelicerata
- Class: Arachnida
- Order: Araneae
- Infraorder: Araneomorphae
- Family: Orsolobidae
- Genus: Duripelta
- Species: D. koomaa

Binomial name
- Duripelta koomaa Forster & Platnick, 1985

Species of spider

Duripelta koomaa is a species of Orsolobidae spider. The species is endemic to New Zealand.

== Taxonomy ==
This species was described in 1985 by Ray Forster and Norman Platnick from male and female specimens collected in Southland. The holotype is stored in Otago Museum.

== Description ==
The male is recorded at 1.23 mm (0.048 in) in length whereas the female is 1.56 mm (0.061 in). The carapace is pale yellow whereas the abdomen is creamy white.

== Distribution ==
This is only known from Southland, New Zealand.

== Conservation status ==
Under the New Zealand Threat Classification System, this species is listed as "Data Deficient" with the qualifiers of "Data Poor: Size", "Data Poor: Trend" and "One Location".
