= Franklin Local Board =

Coordinates: 37.2025258°S 174.9044721°E

Franklin Local Board Te Poari ā-Rohe o Franklin
- Local board of Franklin
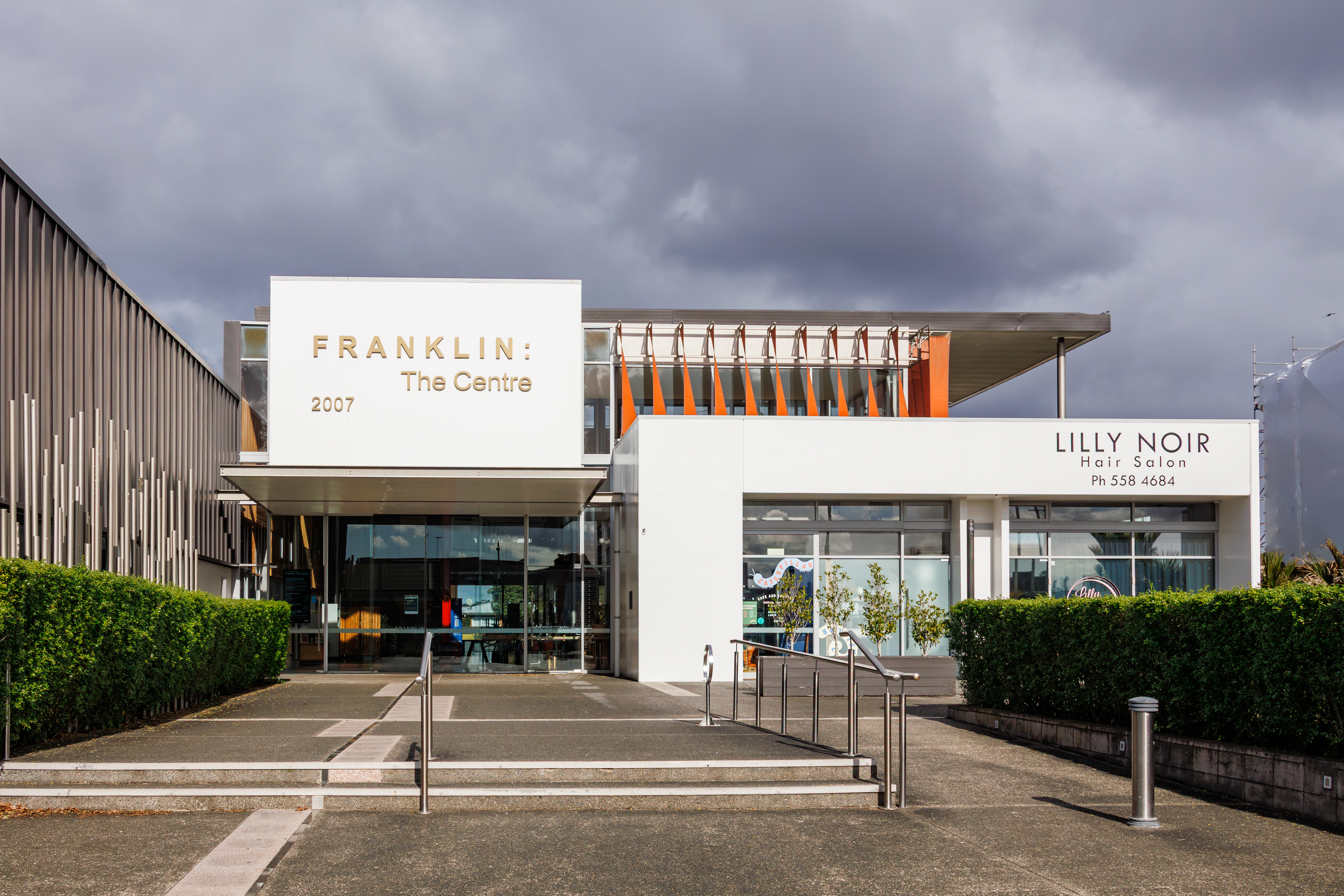
- Franklin: The Centre, home of the Franklin Local Board, among other institutions

- Country: New Zealand
- Region: Auckland
- Territorial authority: Auckland
- Ward: Franklin ward
- Legislated: 2010

Area
  - Land: 1,199.39 km^{2} (463.09 sq mi)

Population (June 2025)
  - Total: 89,900
  - Density: 75.0/km^{2} (194/sq mi)

Local Board Members

Leadership
- Chairperson: Alan Cole, Team Franklin
- Deputy chairperson: Amanda Hopkins, Team Franklin

Structure
- Seats: 9
- Political groups: Team Franklin (8); Working for Waiuku (1)
- Length of term: 3 years

Elections
- Last election: 2025
- Next election: 2028

Meeting place
- The Centre, 12 Massey Avenue, Pukekohe

The Franklin Local Board is one of the 21 local boards of the Auckland Council. It is overseen by the Franklin ward councillor.

The Franklin Local Board area spans the full width of the North Island, from the Hauraki Gulf to the Manukau Harbour. It includes the Hunua Ranges.

Alan Cole is the current chair of the board.

== Geography ==
The area spans from the Hauraki Gulf in the east to the Manukau Harbour and Tasman Sea in the west. The forests of the Hunua Ranges and the southern and western shores of the Manukau Harbour provide a habitat for a range of wildlife, including birds.

Franklin includes the townships of Pukekohe, Waiuku and Beachlands, as well as Awhitu Peninsula, Karaka, Ardmore, Clevedon, Whitford, Maraetai, Kawakawa Bay and Orere Point.

== Economy ==
The area is predominantly rural, with an economy based around horticulture and agriculture. The community is also known for the Clevedon Farmers' Market, horse breeding, and motorsports.

== Demographics ==
Franklin Local Board Area covers 1,199.39 km^{2} (463.09 sq mi) and had an estimated population of 89,900 as of June 2025, with a population density of 75 people per km^{2}.

== 2025-2028 term ==
Elections for the board members for the 2025-2028 term were held as part of the 2025 local elections.

In March 2026, board member Malcolm Bell resigned after 12 years representing the Wairoa subdivision, triggering a by-election held over May and June 2026. The by-election was won by fellow Team Franklin candidate Clare Alder.

As of June 2026, the board members are:

Name	Affiliation	Subdivision	Position
Alan Cole	Team Franklin	Pukekohe	Chairperson
Amanda Hopkins	Team Franklin	Wairoa	Deputy Chairperson
Gary Holmes	Working for Waiuku	Waiuku	Board member
Andrew Kay JP	Team Franklin	Pukekohe	Board member
Alix Bonnington	Team Franklin	Wairoa	Board member
Hunter Hawker	Team Franklin	Ōwairaka	Board member
Lesieli Oliver	Team Franklin	Pukekohe	Board member
Merritt Watson	Team Franklin	Pukekohe	Board member
Clare Alder	Team Franklin	Wairoa	Board member

== 2022-2025 term ==
The board members for the 2022-2025 term, elected at the 2022 local elections, are:

Name	Ticket (if any)	Subdivision	Position
Angela Fulljames	Team Franklin	Wairoa	Chairperson
Alan Cole	Team Franklin	Pukekohe	Deputy Chairperson
Malcolm Bell JP	Team Franklin	Wairoa	Board member
Sharlene Druyven	Team Franklin	Waiuku	Board member
Amanda Kinzett	Team Franklin	Pukekohe	Board member
Logan Soole	Team Franklin	Pukekohe	Board member
Gary Holmes	Working for Waiuku	Waiuku	Board member
Andrew Kay JP	Team Franklin	Pukekohe	Board member
Amanda Hopkins	Team Franklin	Wairoa	Board member

== 2019–2022 term ==
The board members, elected at the 2019 local body elections, in election order, were:

- Alan Cole, Team Franklin, (5633 votes)
- Andy Baker, Team Franklin, (5166 votes)
- Amanda Kinzett, Team Franklin, (3803 votes)
- Angela Fulljames, Team Franklin, (3546 votes)
- Logan Soole, Team Franklin, (3093 votes)
- Sharlene Druyven, Team Franklin, (3048 votes)
- Malcolm Bell, not affiliated, (2971 votes)
- Lance Gedge, Independent, (2886 votes)
- Matthew Murphy, Waiuku First, (1640 votes)

== 2016–2019 term ==
The 2016–2019 board consisted of:

- Angela Fulljames (chair)
- Andy Baker (deputy chair)
- Malcolm Bell
- Alan Cole
- Brendon Crompton
- Sharlene Druyven
- Amanda Hopkins
- Murray Kay
- Niko Kloeten
