= Hūnua =

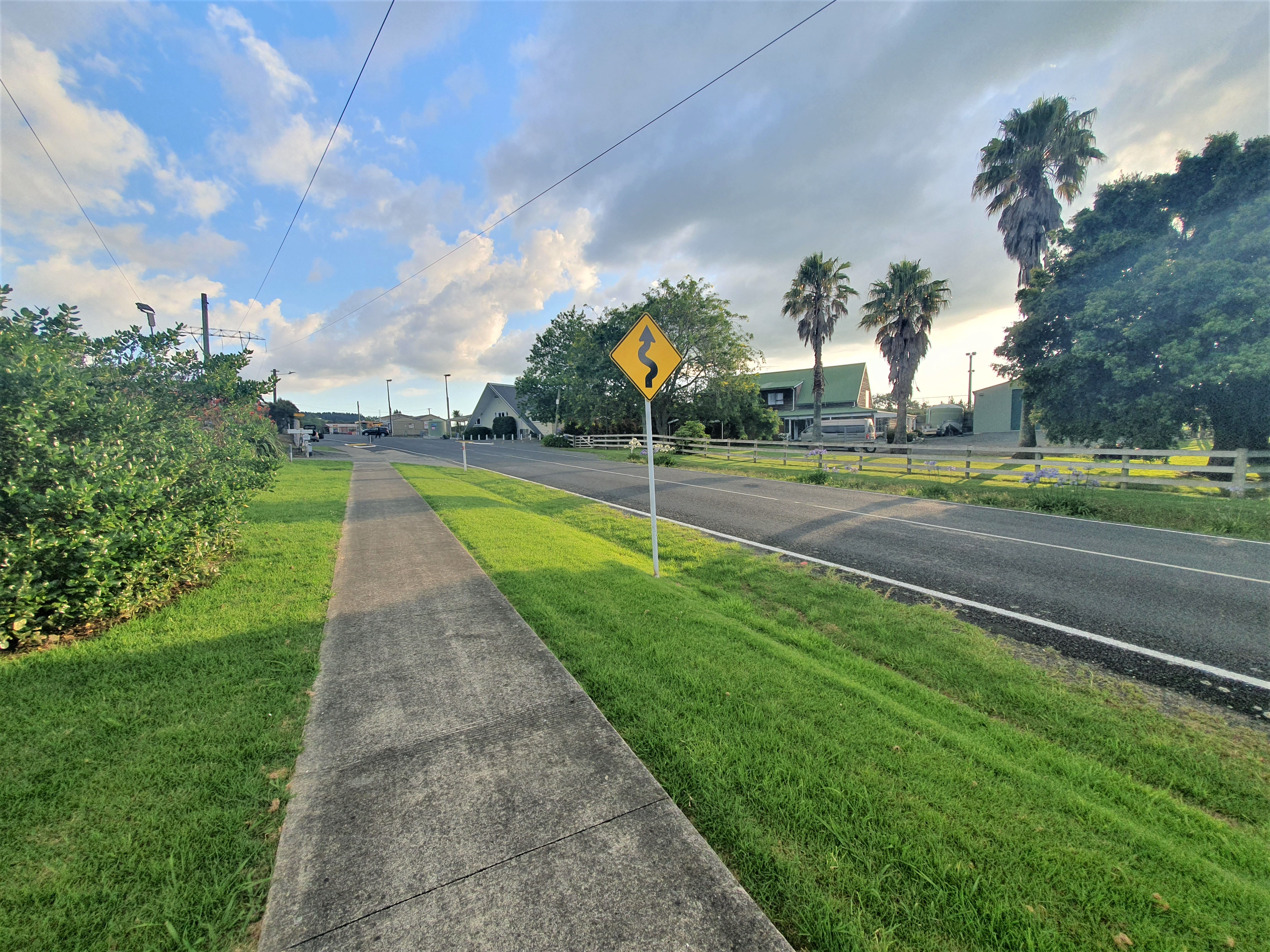
- Interactive map of Hūnua
- Coordinates: 37°04′42″S 175°04′17″E
- Country: New Zealand
- Region: Auckland Region
- Ward: Franklin ward
- Board: Franklin Local Board
- Electorates: Papakura; Hauraki-Waikato

Government
  - Territorial Authority: Auckland Council
  - Mayor of Auckland: Wayne Brown
  - Papakura MP: Vacant
  - Hauraki-Waikato MP: Hana-Rawhiti Maipi-Clarke

Area
  - Total: 0.57 km^{2} (0.22 sq mi)

Population (June 2025)
  - Total: 190
  - Density: 330/km^{2} (860/sq mi)

Hūnua (Māori pronunciation: [hʉˈnʉa]) is a small settlement in the rural outskirts of south Auckland, New Zealand.

Hūnua is 14 kilometres (8.7 mi) east of Papakura, 3.6 kilometres (2.2 mi) from Hūnua Falls and lies at the foot of the Hunua Ranges, from where Auckland obtains most of its water supply. The literal translation of the Māori language word is 'mountainous and sterile land'.

== History ==
Hunua was originally governed by the Hunua Road District Board, formed 26 September 1867, before amalgamating with Franklin County in 1913.

== Demographics ==
Stats NZ describes Hūnua as a rural settlement, which covers 0.57 km^{2} (0.22 sq mi). It had an estimated population of 190 as of June 2025, with a population density of 333 people per km^{2}.

Historical population for Hūnua settlement
| Year | Pop. | ±% p.a. |
|---|---|---|
| 2013 | 165 | — |
| 2018 | 180 | +1.76% |
| 2023 | 186 | +0.66% |

Hūnua had a population of 186 in the 2023 New Zealand census, an increase of 6 people (3.3%) since the 2018 census, and an increase of 21 people (12.7%) since the 2013 census. There were 90 males and 93 females in 54 dwellings. 1.6% of people identified as LGBTIQ+. The median age was 41.8 years (compared with 38.1 years nationally). There were 33 people (17.7%) aged under 15 years, 30 (16.1%) aged 15 to 29, 93 (50.0%) aged 30 to 64, and 27 (14.5%) aged 65 or older.

People could identify as more than one ethnicity. The results were 85.5% European (Pākehā), 19.4% Māori, 1.6% Pasifika, 4.8% Asian, and 3.2% other, which includes people giving their ethnicity as "New Zealander". English was spoken by 96.8%, Māori language by 3.2%, and other languages by 4.8%. The percentage of people born overseas was 14.5, compared with 28.8% nationally.

Religious affiliations were 25.8% Christian, 6.5% Islam, and 1.6% other religions. People who answered that they had no religion were 56.5%, and 11.3% of people did not answer the census question.

Of those at least 15 years old, 24 (15.7%) people had a bachelor's or higher degree, 90 (58.8%) had a post-high school certificate or diploma, and 30 (19.6%) people exclusively held high school qualifications. The median income was $55,000, compared with $41,500 nationally. 27 people (17.6%) earned over $100,000 compared to 12.1% nationally. The employment status of those at least 15 was that 93 (60.8%) people were employed full-time and 21 (13.7%) were part-time.

=== Hūnua statistical area ===
Hūnua statistical area covers 77.83 km^{2} (30.05 sq mi) and had an estimated population of 1,530 as of June 2025, with a population density of 20 people per km^{2}.

Historical population for the statistical area
| Year | Pop. | ±% p.a. |
|---|---|---|
| 2006 | 1,107 | — |
| 2013 | 1,155 | +0.61% |
| 2018 | 1,353 | +3.22% |
| 2023 | 1,497 | +2.04% |

Hūnua had a population of 1,497 in the 2023 New Zealand census, an increase of 144 people (10.6%) since the 2018 census, and an increase of 342 people (29.6%) since the 2013 census. There were 744 males, 750 females and 3 people of other genders in 477 dwellings. 3.2% of people identified as LGBTIQ+. The median age was 42.5 years (compared with 38.1 years nationally). There were 270 people (18.0%) aged under 15 years, 279 (18.6%) aged 15 to 29, 711 (47.5%) aged 30 to 64, and 240 (16.0%) aged 65 or older.

People could identify as more than one ethnicity. The results were 91.6% European (Pākehā); 14.8% Māori; 3.6% Pasifika; 3.6% Asian; 0.6% Middle Eastern, Latin American and African New Zealanders (MELAA); and 2.4% other, which includes people giving their ethnicity as "New Zealander". English was spoken by 98.4%, Māori language by 2.8%, Samoan by 0.8%, and other languages by 7.8%. No language could be spoken by 1.4% (e.g. too young to talk). New Zealand Sign Language was known by 0.2%. The percentage of people born overseas was 19.2, compared with 28.8% nationally.

Religious affiliations were 30.1% Christian, 0.4% Hindu, 1.0% Islam, 1.0% Māori religious beliefs, 0.4% Buddhist, 0.2% New Age, and 0.8% other religions. People who answered that they had no religion were 56.7%, and 9.6% of people did not answer the census question.

Of those at least 15 years old, 288 (23.5%) people had a bachelor's or higher degree, 726 (59.2%) had a post-high school certificate or diploma, and 213 (17.4%) people exclusively held high school qualifications. The median income was $52,600, compared with $41,500 nationally. 249 people (20.3%) earned over $100,000 compared to 12.1% nationally. The employment status of those at least 15 was that 723 (58.9%) people were employed full-time, 186 (15.2%) were part-time, and 27 (2.2%) were unemployed.

== Education ==
Hūnua School is a coeducational full primary school (years 1–8) with a roll of 155 as of July 2026. The school was founded in 1876.

== Climate ==
Hūnua has mild summers and cool winters with regular frosts. Every year an average 19.2 days will exceed 25 °C (77 °F) and 14.6 nights will drop below 0 °C (32 °F).

Climate data for Hūnua (1979–1992)
| Month | Jan | Feb | Mar | Apr | May | Jun | Jul | Aug | Sep | Oct | Nov | Dec | Year |
|---|---|---|---|---|---|---|---|---|---|---|---|---|---|
| Record high °C (°F) | 29.6 (85.3) | 29.2 (84.6) | 27.9 (82.2) | 24.3 (75.7) | 22.5 (72.5) | 19.1 (66.4) | 18.2 (64.8) | 19.8 (67.6) | 21.7 (71.1) | 22.9 (73.2) | 25.0 (77.0) | 28.5 (83.3) | 29.6 (85.3) |
| Mean maximum °C (°F) | 27.5 (81.5) | 26.8 (80.2) | 25.6 (78.1) | 22.6 (72.7) | 20.0 (68.0) | 18.1 (64.6) | 16.7 (62.1) | 17.4 (63.3) | 18.9 (66.0) | 21.1 (70.0) | 22.7 (72.9) | 25.5 (77.9) | 28.0 (82.4) |
| Mean daily maximum °C (°F) | 23.3 (73.9) | 23.4 (74.1) | 22.2 (72.0) | 19.4 (66.9) | 16.4 (61.5) | 14.6 (58.3) | 13.8 (56.8) | 14.5 (58.1) | 15.8 (60.4) | 17.4 (63.3) | 19.4 (66.9) | 21.6 (70.9) | 18.5 (65.3) |
| Daily mean °C (°F) | 18.0 (64.4) | 18.0 (64.4) | 16.9 (62.4) | 14.0 (57.2) | 11.5 (52.7) | 10.0 (50.0) | 8.9 (48.0) | 9.9 (49.8) | 11.4 (52.5) | 12.8 (55.0) | 14.7 (58.5) | 16.4 (61.5) | 13.5 (56.4) |
| Mean daily minimum °C (°F) | 12.6 (54.7) | 12.6 (54.7) | 11.6 (52.9) | 8.6 (47.5) | 6.4 (43.5) | 5.4 (41.7) | 3.9 (39.0) | 5.3 (41.5) | 6.9 (44.4) | 8.1 (46.6) | 9.9 (49.8) | 11.2 (52.2) | 8.5 (47.4) |
| Mean minimum °C (°F) | 6.7 (44.1) | 6.7 (44.1) | 4.8 (40.6) | 2.1 (35.8) | −0.7 (30.7) | −2.0 (28.4) | −3.0 (26.6) | −1.5 (29.3) | 0.5 (32.9) | 1.2 (34.2) | 3.8 (38.8) | 5.1 (41.2) | −3.6 (25.5) |
| Record low °C (°F) | 3.0 (37.4) | 4.9 (40.8) | 2.5 (36.5) | −1.3 (29.7) | −2.0 (28.4) | −3.2 (26.2) | −5.2 (22.6) | −5.4 (22.3) | −1.8 (28.8) | −0.9 (30.4) | 1.6 (34.9) | 0.6 (33.1) | −5.4 (22.3) |
| Average rainfall mm (inches) | 98.5 (3.88) | 89.7 (3.53) | 106.6 (4.20) | 122.0 (4.80) | 113.2 (4.46) | 138.4 (5.45) | 153.3 (6.04) | 136.8 (5.39) | 127.8 (5.03) | 116.0 (4.57) | 103.3 (4.07) | 115.8 (4.56) | 1,421.4 (55.98) |
Source: Earth Sciences NZ (rainfall 1971–2000)
