= Ōrere Point =

- Rural settlement
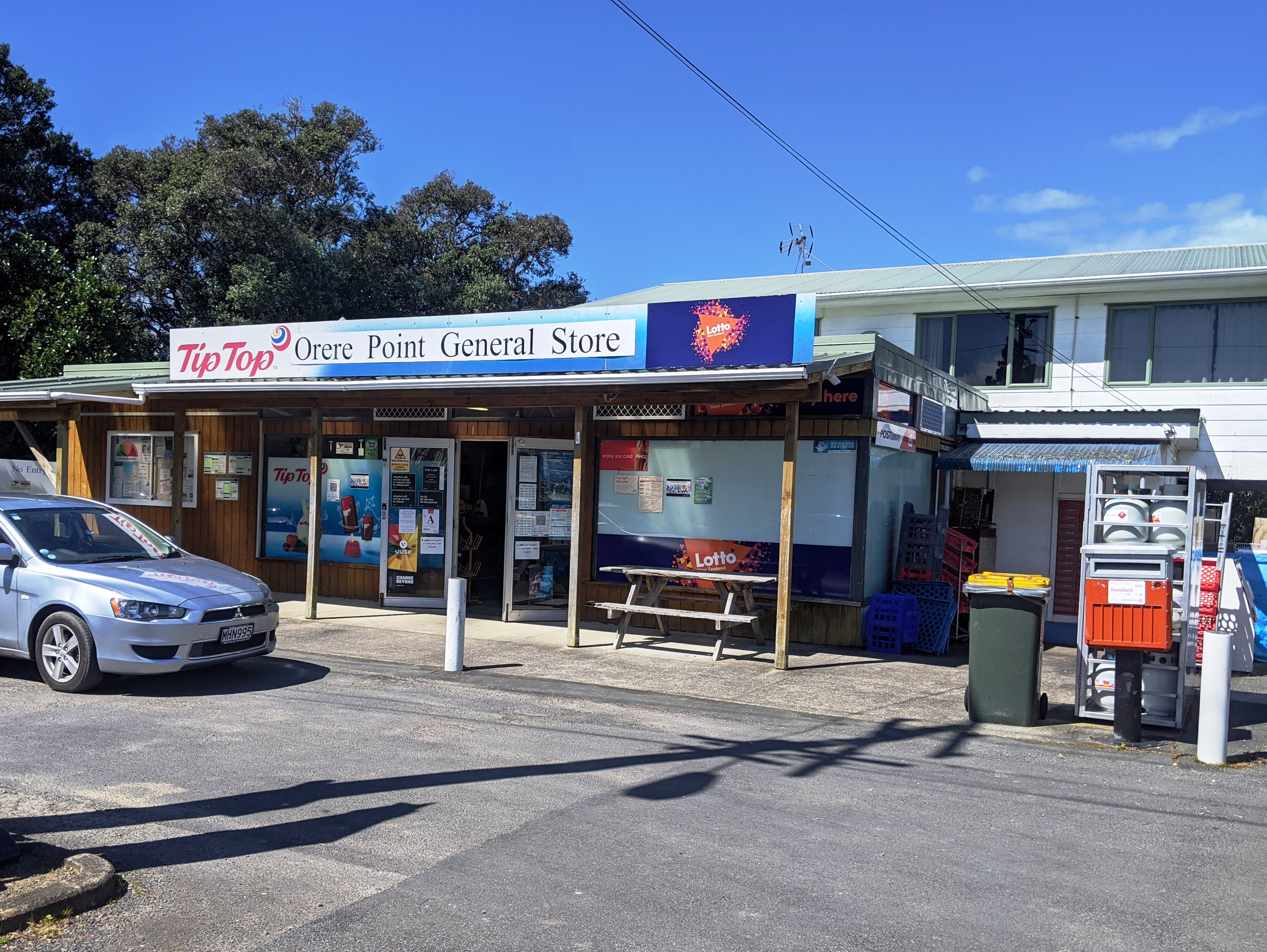
- Orere Point General Store
- Interactive map of Ōrere Point
- Coordinates: 36°58′S 175°15′E
- Country: New Zealand
- Region: Auckland Region
- Ward: Franklin ward
- Board: Franklin Local Board
- Electorates: Papakura; Hauraki-Waikato

Government
  - Territorial authority: Auckland Council

Area
  - Total: 0.80 km^{2} (0.31 sq mi)

Population (June 2025)
  - Total: 390
  - Density: 490/km^{2} (1,300/sq mi)

Ōrere Point is a rural township in the Auckland Region. It is located on the Hauraki Gulf just outside the Auckland metropolitan area. Facilities include a local store, playground, campground, picnic area, parking and limited mobility toilets. Activities include wild life watching, fishing and swimming.

The name was altered to include a macron in 2019.

== Demographics ==
Ōrere Point is defined by Statistics New Zealand as a rural settlement. It covers 0.80 km^{2} (0.31 sq mi) and had an estimated population of 390 as of June 2025, with a population density of 488 people per km^{2}. It is part of the larger Kawakawa Bay-Orere statistical area.

Historical population
| Year | Pop. | ±% p.a. |
|---|---|---|
| 2006 | 324 | — |
| 2013 | 288 | −1.67% |
| 2018 | 345 | +3.68% |
| 2023 | 390 | +2.48% |

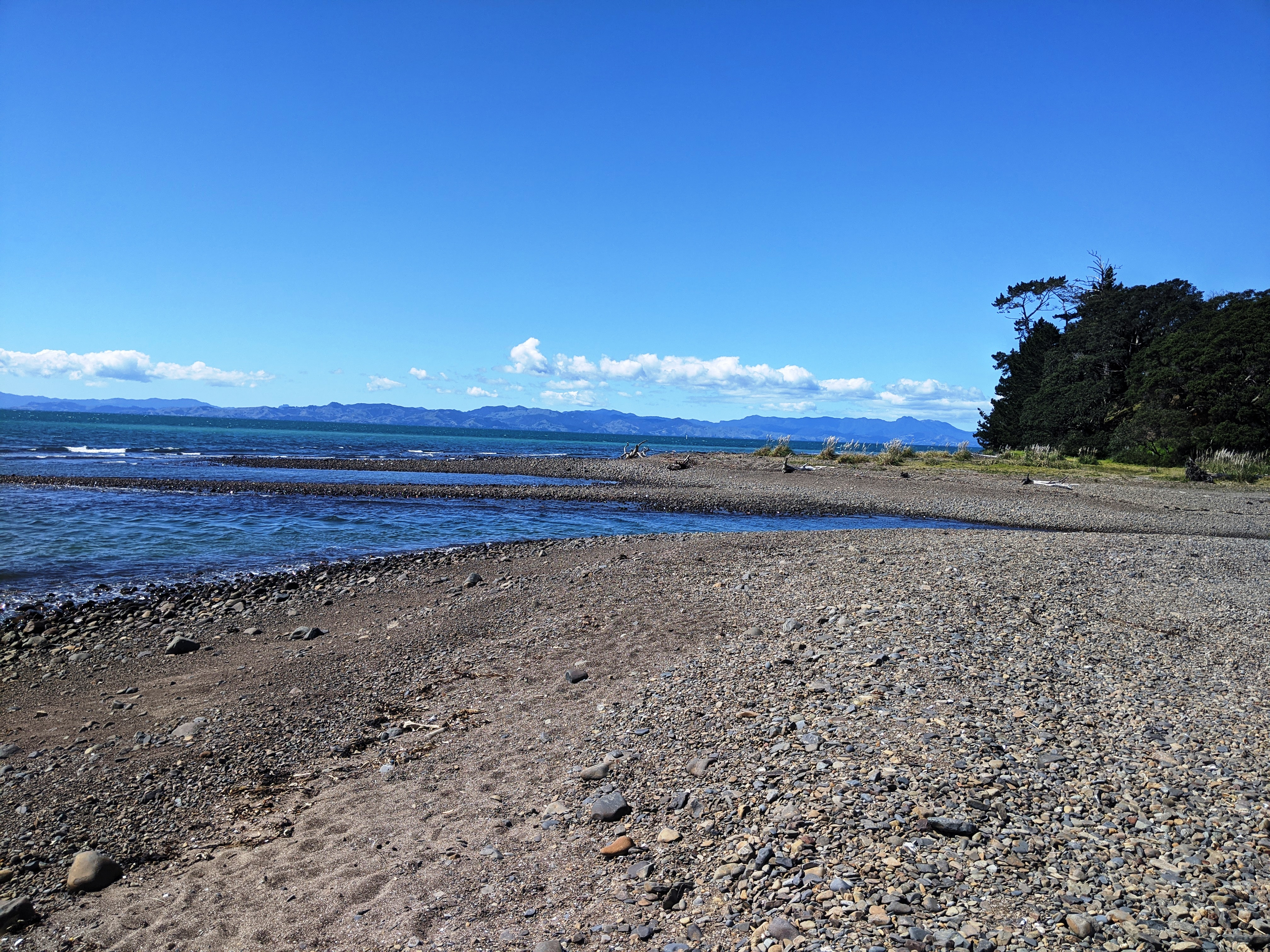
The beach at Ōrere Point, and outlet for the Ōrere River

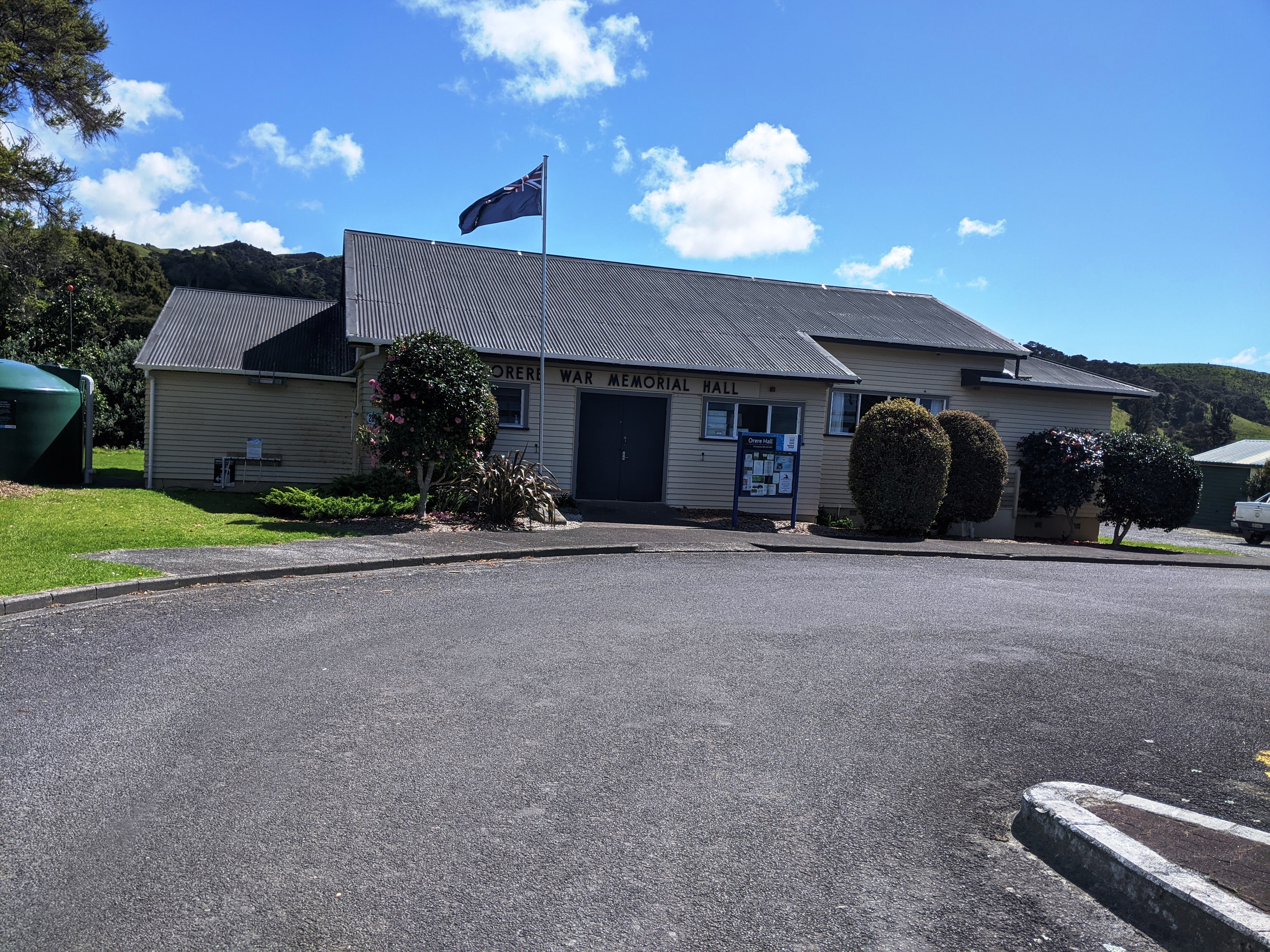
Orere War Memorial Hall

Ōrere Point had a population of 390 in the 2023 New Zealand census, an increase of 45 people (13.0%) since the 2018 census, and an increase of 102 people (35.4%) since the 2013 census. There were 210 males and 180 females in 192 dwellings. 3.1% of people identified as LGBTIQ+. The median age was 54.7 years (compared with 38.1 years nationally). There were 48 people (12.3%) aged under 15 years, 33 (8.5%) aged 15 to 29, 186 (47.7%) aged 30 to 64, and 123 (31.5%) aged 65 or older.

People could identify as more than one ethnicity. The results were 89.2% European (Pākehā), 23.8% Māori, 8.5% Pasifika, 1.5% Asian, and 2.3% other, which includes people giving their ethnicity as "New Zealander". English was spoken by 98.5%, Māori language by 4.6%, Samoan by 0.8%, and other languages by 6.2%. No language could be spoken by 0.8% (e.g. too young to talk). The percentage of people born overseas was 14.6, compared with 28.8% nationally.

Religious affiliations were 33.8% Christian, 2.3% Māori religious beliefs, 0.8% New Age, and 0.8% other religions. People who answered that they had no religion were 53.1%, and 9.2% of people did not answer the census question.

Of those at least 15 years old, 54 (15.8%) people had a bachelor's or higher degree, 180 (52.6%) had a post-high school certificate or diploma, and 111 (32.5%) people exclusively held high school qualifications. The median income was $33,200, compared with $41,500 nationally. 21 people (6.1%) earned over $100,000 compared to 12.1% nationally. The employment status of those at least 15 was that 132 (38.6%) people were employed full-time, 48 (14.0%) were part-time, and 12 (3.5%) were unemployed.

== Education ==
Ōrere School is a coeducational full primary school (years 1–8) with a roll of 38 as of July 2026. The school was founded in 1890, and held a reunion in 2015 to celebrate 125 years.

== Climate ==
Climate data for Orere Point (1951–1980)
| Month | Jan | Feb | Mar | Apr | May | Jun | Jul | Aug | Sep | Oct | Nov | Dec | Year |
|---|---|---|---|---|---|---|---|---|---|---|---|---|---|
| Mean daily maximum °C (°F) | 23.4 (74.1) | 24.4 (75.9) | 22.6 (72.7) | 19.7 (67.5) | 16.8 (62.2) | 15.1 (59.2) | 14.0 (57.2) | 14.7 (58.5) | 16.0 (60.8) | 17.9 (64.2) | 19.7 (67.5) | 21.6 (70.9) | 18.8 (65.9) |
| Daily mean °C (°F) | 18.4 (65.1) | 19.3 (66.7) | 18.0 (64.4) | 15.3 (59.5) | 12.7 (54.9) | 11.0 (51.8) | 9.9 (49.8) | 10.5 (50.9) | 12.3 (54.1) | 14.0 (57.2) | 15.5 (59.9) | 17.1 (62.8) | 14.5 (58.1) |
| Mean daily minimum °C (°F) | 13.4 (56.1) | 14.1 (57.4) | 13.4 (56.1) | 10.9 (51.6) | 8.5 (47.3) | 6.8 (44.2) | 5.7 (42.3) | 6.3 (43.3) | 8.6 (47.5) | 10.0 (50.0) | 11.3 (52.3) | 12.5 (54.5) | 10.1 (50.2) |
| Average rainfall mm (inches) | 72 (2.8) | 99 (3.9) | 69 (2.7) | 101 (4.0) | 109 (4.3) | 77 (3.0) | 113 (4.4) | 118 (4.6) | 104 (4.1) | 89 (3.5) | 91 (3.6) | 87 (3.4) | 1,129 (44.3) |
Source: NIWA
