= Hunua Ranges =

Mountain range and regional park in New Zealand

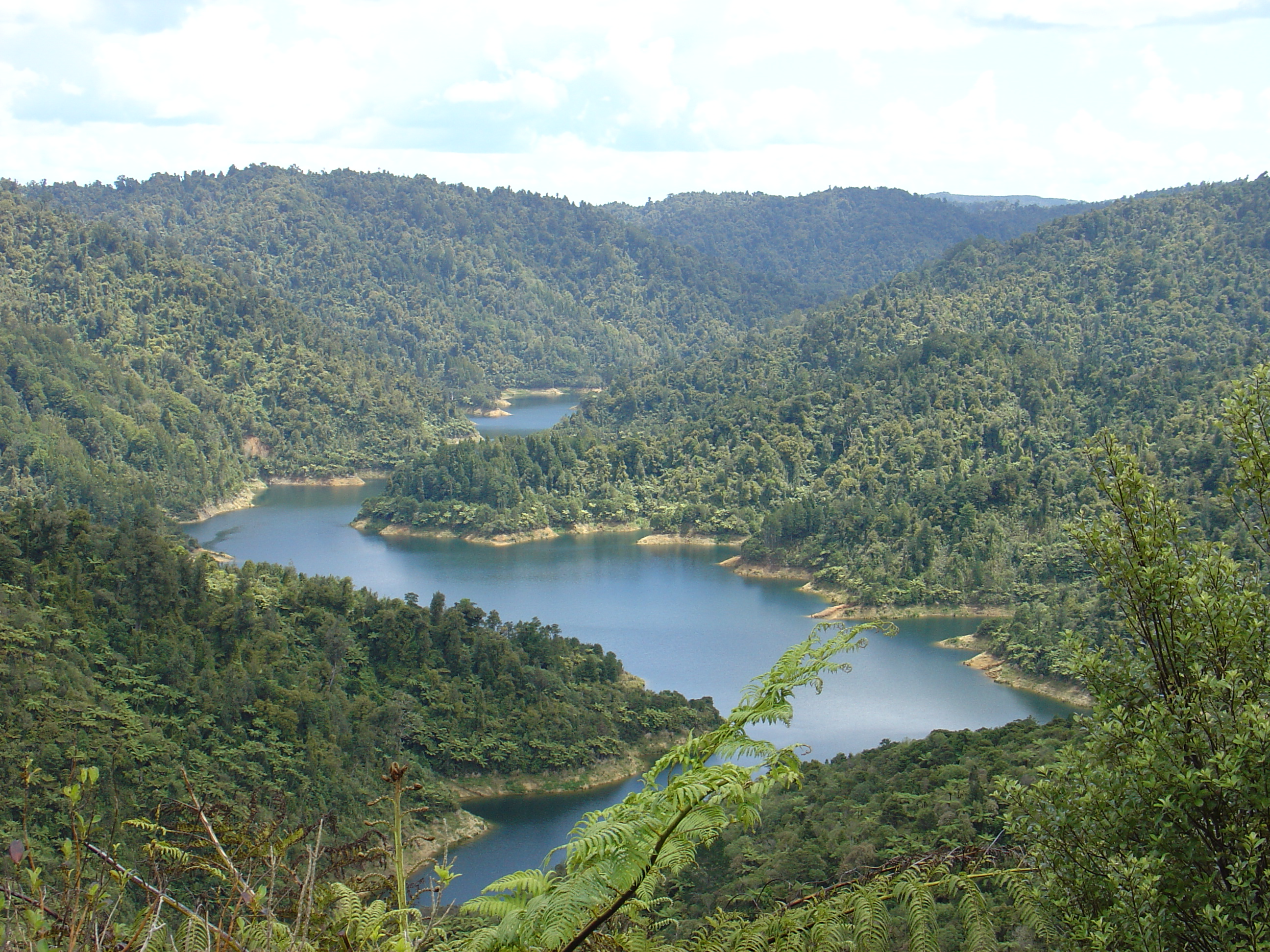
- Mangatangi Reservoir in the Hunua Ranges

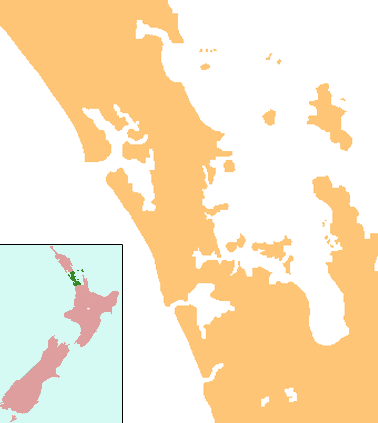
- Location within New Zealand Auckland
- Location: North Island, New Zealand
- Coordinates: 37.07°S 175.18°E
- Area: Ranges: 250 square kilometres (97 sq mi); Regional park: 178 square kilometres (69 sq mi)
- Operator: Auckland Council
- Open: Daylight saving: 6 am–9 pm Non-daylight saving: 6 am–7 pm Pedestrian access: 24 hours

The Hunua Ranges is a mountain range and regional park to the southeast of Auckland city, in the Auckland and Waikato regions of New Zealand's North Island. The ranges cover some 250 square kilometres (97 sq mi) and rise to 688 metres (2255 ft) at Kohukohunui.

Auckland Council owns and manages 178 square kilometres (69 sq mi) of the ranges, including part located in the Waikato region, as a regional park open to the public.

== Geography ==
The ranges are located approximately 50 kilometres (30 mi) southeast of the main Auckland urban area, above the western shore of the Firth of Thames. They are sparsely populated, and mostly lie within the boundaries of the Waharau and Hunua Ranges Regional Parks. The settlement of Hunua lies at the foot of the Hunua Ranges.

The ranges are covered by the largest area of native bush in Auckland, with streams, waterfalls, and hills overlooking the Auckland Region and Hauraki Gulf.

Auckland gets much of its water from reservoirs sources from rivers and streams, including the Hunua Falls on the Wairoa River.

The Mangatawhiri Ridge is one of the last remaining breeding grounds of the North Island kōkako.

=== Kohukohunui ===
Kohukohunui (688 metres (2,257 ft)) is the highest point in the Hunua Ranges. The New Zealand Ministry for Culture and Heritage gives a translation of "great mist" for Kohukohunui.

== History ==
=== Pre-European settlement ===
Tāmaki Māori have traditionally used the ranges for a wide range of resources. The traditional name is Ngāherehere ō Kohukohunui ("The Expansive Forest of Kohukohunui"), named after Kohukohunui, the highest peak of the ranges. Te Hūnua was a name used to describe the wider country between the Wairoa River valley and Papakura. Māori made some use of the ranges and early European visitors found areas of clearing that had been used as gardens. Ngāi Tai ki Tāmaki are tangata whenua for the ranges, and many archaeological sites are known within the ranges.

In November 1769, Captain Cook visited the Hauraki Gulf area. Cook gifted pigs and potatoes to senior members of Te Uri ō Pou from Ōrere, who then planted these along the Wairoa River, as one of the first crops of potatoes grown in New Zealand. The pigs were released into the Hunua Ranges, where they were hunted by Ngāi Tai.

The main part of the ranges was subject to confiscation after the New Zealand Wars. Early European use of the ranges was for timber extraction and for farming but low soil fertility limited success. There has been some mining of Manganese in the past. Gold prospecting for quartz reefs has never found payable reefs.

=== 20th century ===
From the 1920s onwards the land was progressively bought by Auckland City Council utilising funds from its water supply operation. Development of the water supplies commenced in 1946, with the first of the four dams, Cossey's, completed with a capacity of 11.3 million cubic meters in 1956. Three embankment dams were constructed in the area: Upper Mangatāwhiri (1965), Wairoa (1975) and Mangatangi (1977). Combined, the dams have a capacity of 77.1 million cubic meters, and supply approximately 68% of Auckland's potable water, through the Ardmore Water Treatment Plant.

A decision was made to reforest the ranges in the early 1960s, after the area had gradually reverted into farmland. The bulk water supply operation and the land passed to the newly formed Auckland Regional Authority in 1964. The Authority completed the water supply development and continued the exotic afforestation on some of the north and western catchment land, started by the City Council, and its Water Department administered the land. The ranges were planted with a mix of exotic forest and native species, predominantly rimu. The forestry service nursery was one of the first organisations in New Zealand to propagate native trees through grafting techniques, and were the first to successfully graft kauri trees. The forestry service was shut down in the late 1980s, as the Auckland Regional Authority was replaced with the Auckland Regional Council.

The water operation was corporatised as Watercare Services in 1992, but the land itself remained with the Auckland Regional Council. Watercare took ownership of the water related assets and took a long term lease from the Auckland Regional Council of the reservoir areas and the operational areas. The exotic forestry land was also leased to another party. The catchment land became regional park land.

=== 21st century ===
In November 2010, the southernmost part of the Hunua Ranges were transferred to Waikato region. This determines the local government administrative boundaries, but the ownership of the former Auckland Regional Council park land went to the Auckland Council and that of the water assets is unchanged with Watercare Services.

Extensive flooding in the Hunua Ranges in March 2017 cut off roads. People staying on the ranges had to be evacuated.

In May 2018, parts of the park were closed to stop the spread of Kauri dieback. Some of the tracks reopened in late 2020.

In September and October 2018, the entire park was closed during a 1080 pest control programme. The programme was subject to an unsuccessful legal challenge.

== Recreation ==
Activities in the regional park include walking, mountain-biking, bird-watching and drone-flying (by permission).

== Bibliography ==
- Barton, Ian (2001). Hunua: the Place and Its People: a View from 2000. W. J. Deed Printing. ISBN 0-473-07474-5.
