= List of Orsolobidae species =

This page lists all described species of the spider family Orsolobidae accepted by the World Spider Catalog as of February 2021:

== A ==
=== Afrilobus ===
Afrilobus Griswold & Platnick, 1987

- A. australis Griswold & Platnick, 1987 — South Africa
- A. capensis Griswold & Platnick, 1987 (type) — South Africa
- A. jocquei Griswold & Platnick, 1987 — Malawi

=== Anopsolobus ===
Anopsolobus Forster & Platnick, 1985

- A. subterraneus Forster & Platnick, 1985 (type) — New Zealand

=== Ascuta ===
Ascuta Forster, 1956

- A. australis Forster, 1956 — New Zealand
- A. cantuaria Forster & Platnick, 1985 — New Zealand
- A. inopinata Forster, 1956 — New Zealand
- A. insula Forster & Platnick, 1985 — New Zealand
- A. leith Forster & Platnick, 1985 — New Zealand
- A. media Forster, 1956 (type) — New Zealand
- A. monowai Forster & Platnick, 1985 — New Zealand
- A. montana Forster & Platnick, 1985 — New Zealand
- A. musca Forster & Platnick, 1985 — New Zealand
- A. ornata Forster, 1956 — New Zealand
- A. parornata Forster & Platnick, 1985 — New Zealand
- A. taupo Forster & Platnick, 1985 — New Zealand
- A. tongariro Forster & Platnick, 1985 — New Zealand
- A. univa Forster & Platnick, 1985 — New Zealand

=== Australobus ===
Australobus Forster & Platnick, 1985

- A. torbay Forster & Platnick, 1985 (type) — Australia (Western Australia)

=== Azanialobus ===
Azanialobus Griswold & Platnick, 1987

- A. lawrencei Griswold & Platnick, 1987 (type) — South Africa

== B ==
=== Basibulbus ===
Basibulbus Ott, Platnick, Berniker & Bonaldo, 2013

- B. concepcion Ott, Platnick, Berniker & Bonaldo, 2013 — Chile
- B. granizo Ott, Platnick, Berniker & Bonaldo, 2013 — Chile
- B. malleco Ott, Platnick, Berniker & Bonaldo, 2013 (type) — Chile

=== Bealeyia ===
Bealeyia Forster & Platnick, 1985

- B. unicolor Forster & Platnick, 1985 (type) — New Zealand

== C ==
=== Calculus ===
Calculus Purcell, 1910

- C. bicolor Purcell, 1910 (type) — South Africa

=== Chileolobus ===
Chileolobus Forster & Platnick, 1985

- C. eden Forster & Platnick, 1985 (type) — Chile

=== Cornifalx ===
Cornifalx Hickman, 1979

- C. insignis Hickman, 1979 (type) — Australia (Tasmania)

== D ==
=== Dugdalea ===
Dugdalea Forster & Platnick, 1985

- D. oculata Forster & Platnick, 1985 (type) — New Zealand

=== Duripelta ===
Duripelta

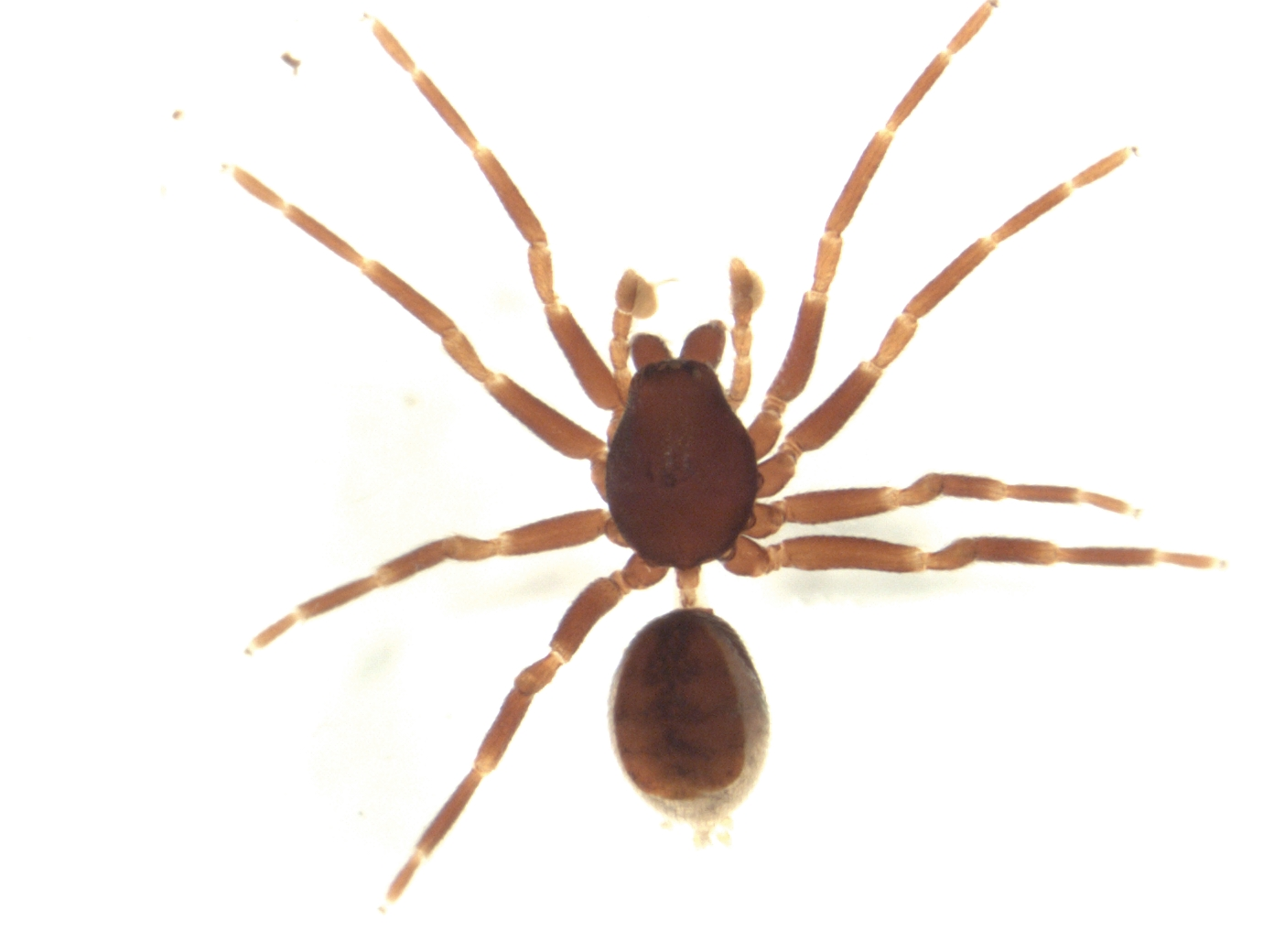
Duripelta sp.

Duripelta Forster, 1956

- D. alta Forster & Platnick, 1985 — New Zealand
- D. australis Forster, 1956 — New Zealand
- D. borealis Forster, 1956 (type) — New Zealand
- D. egmont Forster & Platnick, 1985 — New Zealand
- D. hunua Forster & Platnick, 1985 — New Zealand
- D. koomaa Forster & Platnick, 1985 — New Zealand
- D. mawhero Forster & Platnick, 1985 — New Zealand
- D. minuta Forster, 1956 — New Zealand
- D. monowai Forster & Platnick, 1985 — New Zealand
- D. otara Forster & Platnick, 1985 — New Zealand
- D. pallida (Forster, 1956) — New Zealand
- D. paringa Forster & Platnick, 1985 — New Zealand
- D. peha Forster & Platnick, 1985 — New Zealand
- D. scuta Forster & Platnick, 1985 — New Zealand
- D. totara Forster & Platnick, 1985 — New Zealand
- D. townsendi Forster & Platnick, 1985 — New Zealand
- D. watti Forster & Platnick, 1985 — New Zealand

== F ==
=== Falklandia ===
Falklandia Forster & Platnick, 1985

- F. rumbolli (Schiapelli & Gerschman, 1974) (type) — Falkland Is.

== H ==
=== Hickmanolobus ===
Hickmanolobus Forster & Platnick, 1985

- H. ibisca Baehr & Smith, 2008 — Australia (Queensland, New South Wales)
- H. jojo Baehr & Smith, 2008 — Australia (New South Wales)
- H. linnaei Baehr & Smith, 2008 — Australia (New South Wales)
- H. mollipes (Hickman, 1932) (type) — Australia (Tasmania)
- H. nimorakiotakisi Baehr, Raven & Hebron, 2011 — Australia (Queensland)

== L ==
=== Losdolobus ===
Losdolobus Platnick & Brescovit, 1994

- L. nelsoni Pompozzi, 2015 — Uruguay, Argentina
- L. opytapora Brescovit, Bertoncello & Ott, 2004 — Brazil
- L. parana Platnick & Brescovit, 1994 (type) — Brazil, Argentina
- L. xaruanus Lise & Almeida, 2006 — Brazil
- L. ybypora Brescovit, Ott & Lise, 2004 — Brazil

== M ==
=== Mallecolobus ===
Mallecolobus Forster & Platnick, 1985

- M. malacus Forster & Platnick, 1985 (type) — Chile
- M. maullin Forster & Platnick, 1985 — Chile
- M. pedrus Forster & Platnick, 1985 — Chile
- M. sanus Forster & Platnick, 1985 — Chile

=== Maoriata ===
Maoriata Forster & Platnick, 1985

- M. magna (Forster, 1956) (type) — New Zealand
- M. montana Forster & Platnick, 1985 — New Zealand
- M. vulgaris Forster & Platnick, 1985 — New Zealand

== O ==
=== Orongia ===
Orongia Forster & Platnick, 1985

- O. medialis Forster & Platnick, 1985 (type) — New Zealand
- O. motueka Forster & Platnick, 1985 — New Zealand
- O. whangamoa Forster & Platnick, 1985 — New Zealand

=== Orsolobus ===
Orsolobus Simon, 1893

- O. chelifer Tullgren, 1902 — Chile
- O. chilensis Forster & Platnick, 1985 — Chile
- O. mapocho Forster & Platnick, 1985 — Chile
- O. montt Forster & Platnick, 1985 — Chile
- O. plenus Forster & Platnick, 1985 — Chile
- O. pucara Forster & Platnick, 1985 — Chile, Argentina
- O. pucatrihue Forster & Platnick, 1985 — Chile
- O. schlingeri Forster & Platnick, 1985 — Chile
- O. singularis (Nicolet, 1849) (type) — Chile

=== Osornolobus ===
Osornolobus Forster & Platnick, 1985

- O. anticura Forster & Platnick, 1985 — Chile
- O. antillanca Forster & Platnick, 1985 — Chile
- O. canan Forster & Platnick, 1985 (type) — Chile
- O. cautin Forster & Platnick, 1985 — Chile
- O. cekalovici Forster & Platnick, 1985 — Chile
- O. chaiten Forster & Platnick, 1985 — Chile
- O. chapo Forster & Platnick, 1985 — Chile
- O. chiloe Forster & Platnick, 1985 — Chile
- O. concepcion Forster & Platnick, 1985 — Chile
- O. correntoso Forster & Platnick, 1985 — Chile
- O. magallanes Forster & Platnick, 1985 — Chile
- O. malalcahuello Forster & Platnick, 1985 — Chile
- O. nahuelbuta Forster & Platnick, 1985 — Chile
- O. newtoni Forster & Platnick, 1985 — Chile
- O. penai Forster & Platnick, 1985 — Chile
- O. thayerae Forster & Platnick, 1985 — Chile
- O. trancas Forster & Platnick, 1985 — Chile

== P ==
=== Paralobus ===
Paralobus Forster & Platnick, 1985

- P. salmoni (Forster, 1956) (type) — New Zealand

=== Pounamuella ===
Pounamuella Forster & Platnick, 1985

- P. australis (Forster, 1964) — New Zealand (Auckland Is.)
- P. complexa (Forster, 1956) — New Zealand
- P. hauroko Forster & Platnick, 1985 — New Zealand
- P. hollowayae (Forster, 1956) — New Zealand
- P. insula Forster & Platnick, 1985 — New Zealand
- P. kuscheli Forster & Platnick, 1985 — New Zealand
- P. ramsayi (Forster, 1956) — New Zealand
- P. vulgaris (Forster, 1956) (type) — New Zealand

== S ==
=== Subantarctia ===
Subantarctia Forster, 1955

- S. centralis Forster & Platnick, 1985 — New Zealand
- S. dugdalei Forster, 1956 — New Zealand
- S. fiordensis Forster, 1956 — New Zealand
- S. florae Forster, 1956 — New Zealand
- S. muka Forster & Platnick, 1985 — New Zealand
- S. penara Forster & Platnick, 1985 — New Zealand
- S. stewartensis Forster, 1956 — New Zealand
- S. trina Forster & Platnick, 1985 — New Zealand
- S. turbotti Forster, 1955 (type) — New Zealand (Auckland Is.)

== T ==
=== Tangata ===
Tangata Forster & Platnick, 1985

- T. alpina (Forster, 1956) — New Zealand
- T. furcata Forster & Platnick, 1985 — New Zealand
- T. horningi Forster & Platnick, 1985 — New Zealand
- T. kohuka Forster & Platnick, 1985 — New Zealand
- T. murihiku Forster & Platnick, 1985 — New Zealand
- T. nigra Forster & Platnick, 1985 (type) — New Zealand
- T. orepukiensis (Forster, 1956) — New Zealand
- T. otago Forster & Platnick, 1985 — New Zealand
- T. parafurcata Forster & Platnick, 1985 — New Zealand
- T. plena (Forster, 1956) — New Zealand
- T. pouaka Forster & Platnick, 1985 — New Zealand
- T. rakiura (Forster, 1956) — New Zealand
- T. stewartensis (Forster, 1956) — New Zealand
- T. sylvester Forster & Platnick, 1985 — New Zealand
- T. tautuku Forster & Platnick, 1985 — New Zealand
- T. townsendi Forster & Platnick, 1985 — New Zealand
- T. waipoua Forster & Platnick, 1985 — New Zealand

=== Tasmanoonops ===
Tasmanoonops Hickman, 1930

- T. alipes Hickman, 1930 (type) — Australia (Tasmania)
- T. australis Forster & Platnick, 1985 — Australia (Western Australia)
- T. buang Forster & Platnick, 1985 — Australia (Victoria)
- T. buffalo Forster & Platnick, 1985 — Australia (Victoria)
- T. complexus Forster & Platnick, 1985 — Australia (Queensland)
- T. daviesae Forster & Platnick, 1985 — Australia (Queensland)
- T. dorrigo Forster & Platnick, 1985 — Australia (New South Wales)
- T. drimus Forster & Platnick, 1985 — Australia (Victoria)
- T. elongatus Forster & Platnick, 1985 — Australia (New South Wales)
- T. fulvus Hickman, 1979 — Australia (Tasmania)
- T. grayi Forster & Platnick, 1985 — Australia (New South Wales)
- T. hickmani Forster & Platnick, 1985 — Australia (Queensland)
- T. hunti Forster & Platnick, 1985 — Australia (New South Wales)
- T. inornatus Hickman, 1979 — Australia (Tasmania)
- T. insulanus Forster & Platnick, 1985 — Australia (Tasmania)
- T. magnus Hickman, 1979 — Australia (Tasmania)
- T. mainae Forster & Platnick, 1985 — Australia (Western Australia)
- T. minutus Forster & Platnick, 1985 — Australia (Victoria)
- T. mysticus Forster & Platnick, 1985 — Australia (New South Wales)
- T. oranus Forster & Platnick, 1985 — Australia (Victoria)
- T. otimus Forster & Platnick, 1985 — Australia (New South Wales)
- T. pallidus Forster & Platnick, 1985 — Australia (New South Wales)
- T. parinus Forster & Platnick, 1985 — Australia (New South Wales)
- T. parvus Forster & Platnick, 1985 — Australia (Queensland)
- T. pinus Forster & Platnick, 1985 — Australia (New South Wales)
- T. ripus Forster & Platnick, 1985 — Australia (New South Wales)
- T. rogerkitchingi Baehr, Raven & Hebron, 2011 — Australia (Queensland)
- T. septentrionalis Forster & Platnick, 1985 — Australia (Queensland)
- T. trispinus Forster & Platnick, 1985 — Australia (Tasmania)
- T. unicus Forster & Platnick, 1985 — Australia (Queensland)

=== Tautukua ===
Tautukua Forster & Platnick, 1985

- T. isolata Forster & Platnick, 1985 (type) — New Zealand

=== Turretia ===
Turretia Forster & Platnick, 1985

- T. dugdalei Forster & Platnick, 1985 (type) — New Zealand

== W ==
=== Waiporia ===
Waiporia Forster & Platnick, 1985

- W. algida (Forster, 1956) — New Zealand
- W. chathamensis Forster & Platnick, 1985 — New Zealand (Chatham Is.)
- W. egmont Forster & Platnick, 1985 — New Zealand
- W. extensa (Forster, 1956) — New Zealand
- W. hawea Forster & Platnick, 1985 — New Zealand
- W. hornabrooki (Forster, 1956) — New Zealand
- W. mensa (Forster, 1956) — New Zealand
- W. modica (Forster, 1956) — New Zealand
- W. owaka Forster & Platnick, 1985 — New Zealand
- W. ruahine Forster & Platnick, 1985 — New Zealand
- W. tuata Forster & Platnick, 1985 — New Zealand
- W. wiltoni Forster & Platnick, 1985 (type) — New Zealand

=== Waipoua ===
Waipoua Forster & Platnick, 1985

- W. gressitti (Forster, 1964) — New Zealand (Campbell Is.)
- W. hila Forster & Platnick, 1985 — New Zealand
- W. insula Forster & Platnick, 1985 — New Zealand
- W. montana Forster & Platnick, 1985 — New Zealand
- W. otiana Forster & Platnick, 1985 — New Zealand
- W. ponanga Forster & Platnick, 1985 — New Zealand
- W. toronui Forster & Platnick, 1985 (type) — New Zealand
- W. totara (Forster, 1956) — New Zealand

=== Wiltonia ===
Wiltonia Forster & Platnick, 1985

- W. elongata Forster & Platnick, 1985 — New Zealand
- W. eylesi Forster & Platnick, 1985 — New Zealand
- W. fiordensis Forster & Platnick, 1985 — New Zealand
- W. graminicola Forster & Platnick, 1985 (type) — New Zealand
- W. lima Forster & Platnick, 1985 — New Zealand
- W. nelsonensis Forster & Platnick, 1985 — New Zealand
- W. pecki Forster & Platnick, 1985 — New Zealand
- W. porina Forster & Platnick, 1985 — New Zealand
- W. rotoiti Forster & Platnick, 1985 — New Zealand
