= Maoriata vulgaris =

Conservation status
- Not Threatened (NZ TCS)

Scientific classification
- Kingdom: Animalia
- Phylum: Arthropoda
- Subphylum: Chelicerata
- Class: Arachnida
- Order: Araneae
- Infraorder: Araneomorphae
- Family: Orsolobidae
- Genus: Maoriata
- Species: M. vulgaris

Binomial name
- Maoriata vulgaris Forster & Platnick, 1985

Species of spider

Maoriata vulgaris is a species of Orsolobidae spider. The species is endemic to New Zealand.

== Taxonomy ==
This species was described in 1985 by Ray Forster and Norman Platnick from male and female specimens collected in Otago. The holotype is stored in Otago Museum. The species remains recognised as valid by the World Spider Catalog, which currently lists it as one of three accepted species in the genus Maoriata; the other species are Maoriata magna and Maoriata montana."World Spider Catalog". Natural History Museum Bern.

== Description ==
The male is recorded at 4.05 mm (0.159 in) in length whereas the female is 4.81 mm (0.189 in). The abdomen has a chevron pattern dorsally.

== Distribution and habitat ==
This species is only known from tussock habitats in Otago.

== Conservation status ==
Under the New Zealand Threat Classification System, this species is listed as "Not Threatened".
