= Muka =

Muka can refer to:

- Manis Muka Mohd Darah (1954–2020), Malaysian politician
- Muka (fibre), traditional fibre used by the Maori people of New Zealand
- Muka language, Grassfields Bantu language of Cameroon
- Muka (surname), Albanian surname

== See also ==
- Muka Muka Paradise, manga series
- Kuka muu muka, 2013 studio album by Cheek
- Seri muka, Malay dessert
- Subantarctia muka, spider species native to New Zealand
