= Afrilobus australis =

Scientific classification
- Kingdom: Animalia
- Phylum: Arthropoda
- Subphylum: Chelicerata
- Class: Arachnida
- Order: Araneae
- Infraorder: Araneomorphae
- Family: Orsolobidae
- Genus: Afrilobus
- Species: A. australis

Binomial name
- Afrilobus australis Griswold & Platnick, 1987

Species of spider

Afrilobus australis is a species of spider in the family Orsolobidae. It is endemic to South Africa, where it is known only from the Western Cape province.

The species is commonly known as the Knysna six-eyed ground spider.

== Etymology ==
The specific name australis (Latin for "southern") refers to the occurrence of this species in the southernmost part of Africa.

== Distribution and habitat ==
Afrilobus australis is known from three localities in the Western Cape province: the Knysna Forest, Diepwalle Forest Station, and De Hoop Nature Reserve. The species has been recorded at elevations ranging from 42 to 353 metres above sea level.

The spider inhabits ground-level environments, wandering among low vegetation, humus, leaf litter and moss. It has been collected from both Fynbos and Forest biomes.

== Description ==
Only females of Afrilobus australis are known to science. The female has a total length of 3.43 mm.

The cephalothorax is yellowish brown with black coloration around the eyes and dark reticulations, particularly behind the eyes and on the foveal region. The opisthosoma is white with purple pigmentation on the upper surface and sides, interrupted by a white band across the middle and white chevron markings on the back portion. The underside has two dark longitudinal bands in front of the spinnerets.

The clypeus is narrow, measuring 0.08 mm high. The chelicerae are 0.52 mm long and bear two teeth on both the front and rear margins. The legs are slender with a leg formula of 4213 (fourth leg longest, third leg shortest).

Females can be distinguished from the related species Afrilobus capensis by having spotted markings at the tips of the leg segments and a specialized sensory organ on the foot with more than 15 small projections.

== Conservation status ==
Afrilobus australis is classified as Data Deficient in the South African national red list due to taxonomic uncertainty. The male of the species remains unknown, and additional sampling is needed to determine the full extent of the species' range.

The species is protected within De Hoop Nature Reserve and Diepwalle Forest Station, and there are currently no known threats to its survival.
