= Hickmanolobus nimorakiotakisi =

Scientific classification
- Kingdom: Animalia
- Phylum: Arthropoda
- Subphylum: Chelicerata
- Class: Arachnida
- Order: Araneae
- Infraorder: Araneomorphae
- Family: Orsolobidae
- Genus: Hickmanolobus
- Species: H. nimorakiotakisi

Binomial name
- Hickmanolobus nimorakiotakisi Baehr, Raven & Hebron, 2011

Species of spider

Hickmanolobus nimorakiotakisi is a species of spider in the family Orsolobidae. It is endemic to Queensland, Australia, and was described in 2011 from male specimens collected in rainforest at Lamington National Park.

== Taxonomy ==
The species was described in 2011 by Barbara Baehr, Robert Raven and Wendy Hebron in a paper on the Orsolobidae collected during the IBISCA-Queensland Project, a survey of invertebrates along an altitudinal gradient in Lamington National Park. It is placed in the genus Hickmanolobus, which was established by Forster and Platnick in 1985, and is listed as an accepted species in the World Spider Catalog.

The holotype is a male collected at IBISCA site 1100C in Lamington National Park (about 1,106 m (3,629 ft) above sea level) on 26 October 2006 by C. Burwell using a pyrethrum knockdown; it is held in the Queensland Museum (registration number QM S86313). A second male, collected at Mount Asplenium in January 1993 by G. Monteith, was also examined.

=== Etymology ===
The specific epithet is a patronym in honour of Dr Bill Nimorakiotakis, then Deputy Director of the Australian Venom Research Unit at the University of Melbourne, whom the authors credit with supporting spider taxonomy "with great passion".

== Description ==
Only the male is known. Photomicrographs of the male in dorsal, frontal, lateral and ventral views are published in the original description. The holotype has a total length of 1.63 mm (0.064 in), with the carapace 0.76 mm (0.030 in) long and 0.58 mm (0.023 in) wide, and the abdomen 0.87 mm (0.034 in) long and 0.51 mm (0.020 in) wide. The carapace is yellow-brown and the legs are yellow-brown. There are six well-developed eyes. The abdomen is purple, with five pale, inverted V-shaped chevrons along the midline. The male pedipalp has a pyriform (pear-shaped) bulb with a long, thin embolus.

The authors distinguished the species from Hickmanolobus mollipes of Tasmania, which it resembles, by its abdominal pattern of five inverted V-shaped chevrons (rather than five transverse bars) and by a more slender male palpal bulb.

== Distribution and habitat ==
Hickmanolobus nimorakiotakisi is known only from Queensland. The holotype was collected in rainforest at Lamington National Park at about 1,106 m (3,629 ft), and the second known specimen at Mount Asplenium at about 1,290 m (4,230 ft). In the IBISCA-Queensland survey, all five orsolobid species recorded were collected only above about 750 m (2,460 ft); the authors suggested that orsolobids could be useful for monitoring the effects of climate change on the park's fauna.
