= Subantarctia fiordensis =

Conservation status
- Not Threatened (NZ TCS)

Scientific classification
- Kingdom: Animalia
- Phylum: Arthropoda
- Subphylum: Chelicerata
- Class: Arachnida
- Order: Araneae
- Infraorder: Araneomorphae
- Family: Orsolobidae
- Genus: Subantarctia
- Species: S. fiordensis

Binomial name
- Subantarctia fiordensis Forster, 1956

Species of spider

Subantarctia fiordensis is a species of Orsolobidae. The species is endemic to New Zealand.

== Taxonomy ==
This species was described in 1956 by Ray Forster from male and immature female specimens collected in Fiordland. The holotype is stored in Canterbury Museum.

== Description ==
The male is recorded at 2.65mm in length. Adult females are not known, but an immature female was recorded as 2.39mm in length. This species has legs that are pale reddish brown, a carapace that is reddish brown and an abdomen that is uniform white.

== Distribution ==
This species is only known from Fiordland, New Zealand.

== Conservation status ==
Under the New Zealand Threat Classification System, this species is listed as "Not Threatened".
