= Orongia motueka =

Conservation status
- Data Deficit (NZ TCS)

Scientific classification
- Kingdom: Animalia
- Phylum: Arthropoda
- Subphylum: Chelicerata
- Class: Arachnida
- Order: Araneae
- Infraorder: Araneomorphae
- Family: Orsolobidae
- Genus: Orongia
- Species: O. motueka

Binomial name
- Orongia motueka Forster & Platnick, 1985

Species of spider

Orongia motueka is a species of Orsolobidae. The species is endemic to New Zealand.

== Taxonomy ==
This species was described in 1985 by Ray Forster and Norman Platnick from female specimens collected in Nelson. The holotype is stored in Otago Museum.

== Description ==
The female is recorded at 4.96 mm (0.195 in) in length. This species has an unpigmented carapace. The abdomen has a chevron pattern dorsally.

== Distribution ==
This species is only known from Nelson, New Zealand.

== Conservation status ==
Under the New Zealand Threat Classification System, this species is listed as "Data Deficient" with the qualifiers "Data Poor: Size", "Data Poor: Trend" and "One Location".
