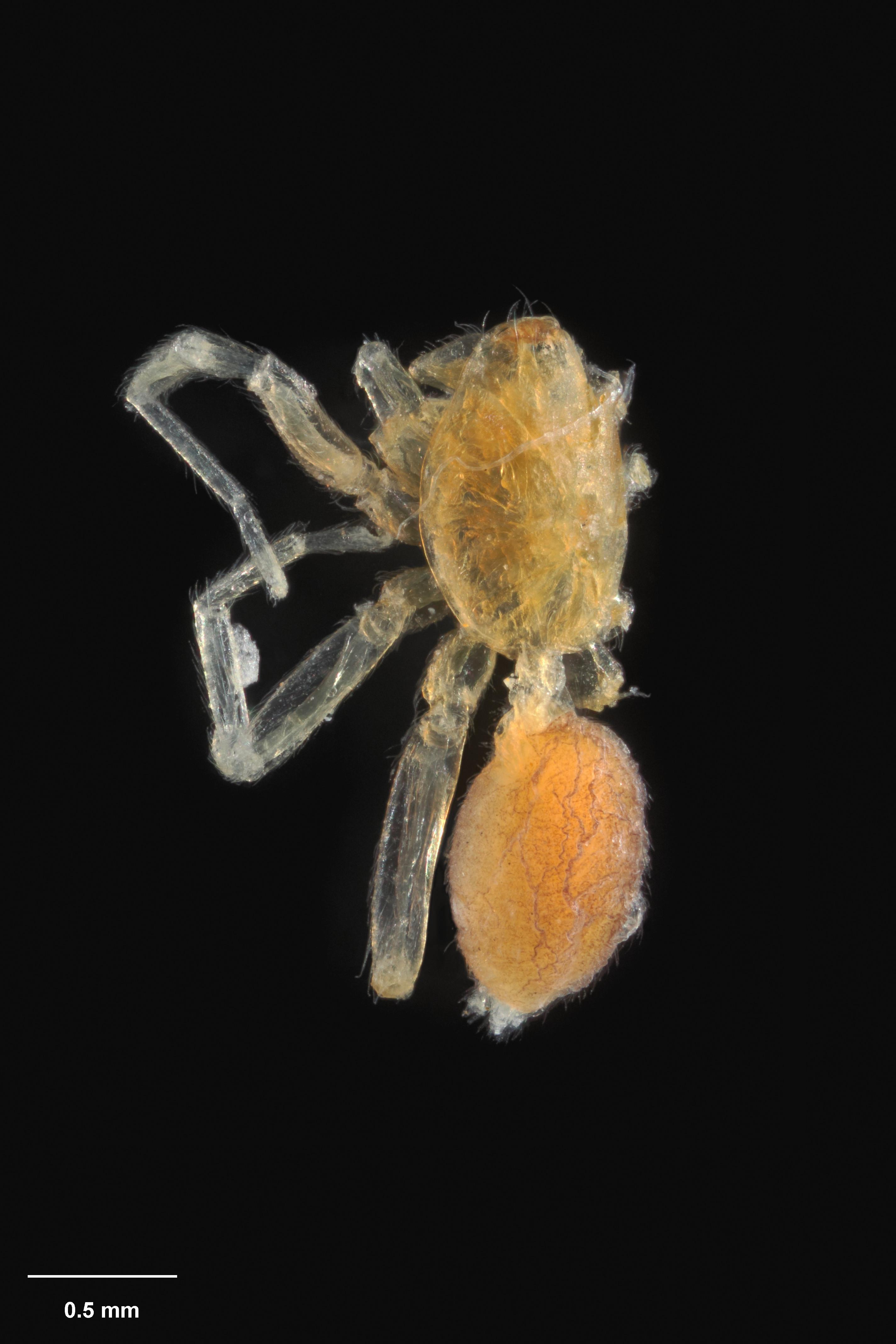

Conservation status
- Naturally Uncommon (NZ TCS)

Scientific classification
- Kingdom: Animalia
- Phylum: Arthropoda
- Subphylum: Chelicerata
- Class: Arachnida
- Order: Araneae
- Infraorder: Araneomorphae
- Family: Orsolobidae
- Genus: Pounamuella
- Species: P. australis

Binomial name
- Pounamuella australis (Forster, 1964)

Synonyms
- Pounamua australis

= Pounamuella australis =

Species of spider

Pounamuella australis is a species of Orsolobidae. The species is endemic to New Zealand.

== Taxonomy ==
This species was described as Pounamua australis in 1964 by Ray Forster from female specimens collected on Auckland Island. The species was renamed as Pounamuella australis in 1985 and the male was described. The holotype is stored in Te Papa Museum under registration number AS.000011.

== Description ==
The female is recorded at 2.26mm in length whereas the male is 2mm.

== Distribution ==
This species is endemic to the Auckland Islands, New Zealand.

== Conservation status ==
Under the New Zealand Threat Classification System, this species is listed as "Naturally Uncommon" with the qualifiers of "Island Endemic" and "One Location".
