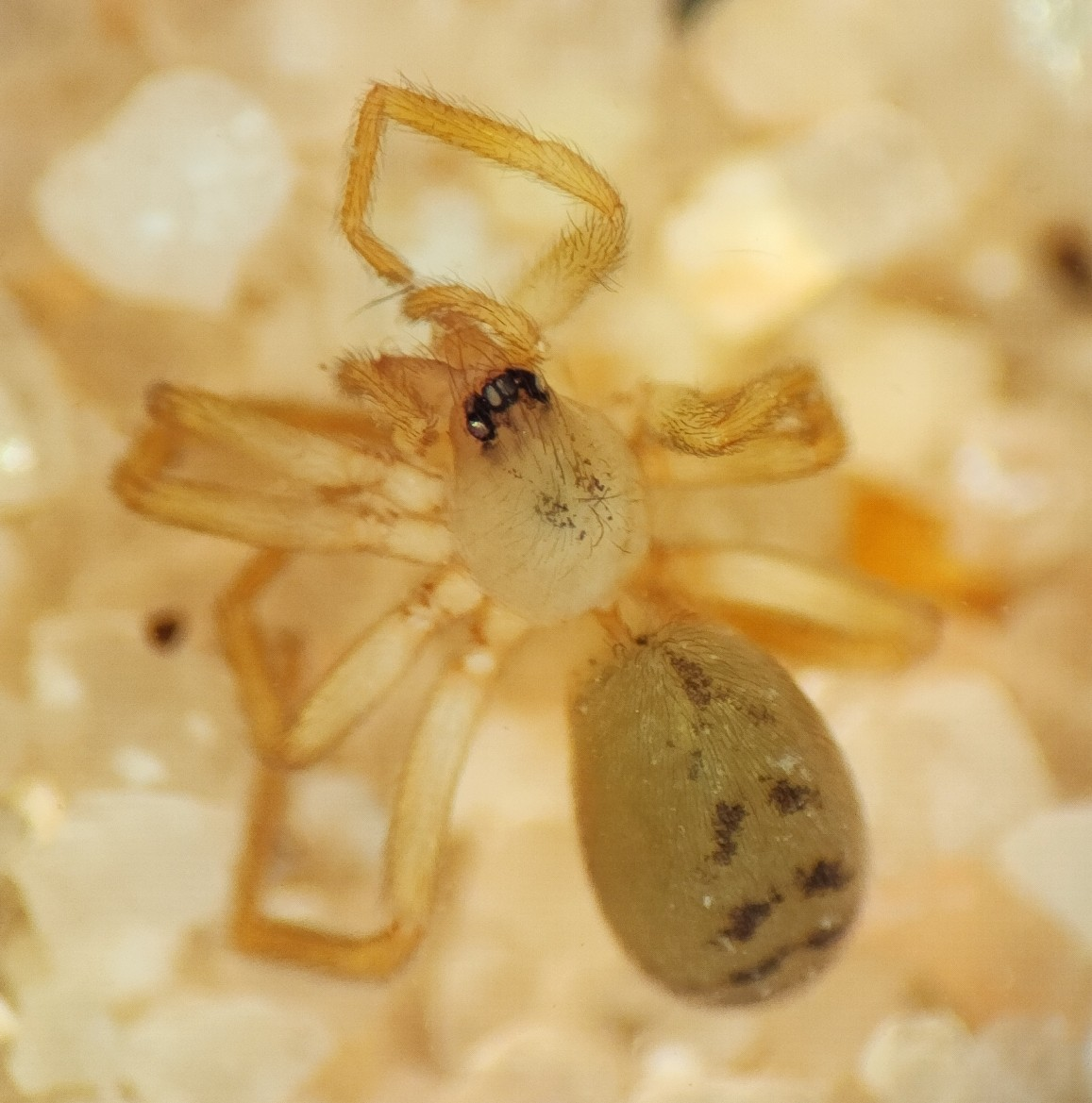

Conservation status
- Naturally Uncommon (NZ TCS)

Scientific classification
- Kingdom: Animalia
- Phylum: Arthropoda
- Subphylum: Chelicerata
- Class: Arachnida
- Order: Araneae
- Infraorder: Araneomorphae
- Family: Orsolobidae
- Genus: Wiltonia
- Species: W. graminicola

Binomial name
- Wiltonia graminicola Forster & Platnick, 1985

= Wiltonia graminicola =

Species of spider

Wiltonia graminicola is a species of Orsolobidae that is endemic to New Zealand.

== Taxonomy ==
This species was described in 1985 by Ray Forster and Norman Platnick from male and female specimens collected in Dunedin. It is the type species of Wiltonia. The holotype is stored in Otago Museum.

== Description ==
The male is recorded at 2.64mm in length whereas the female is 2.36mm. The carapace and abdomen are patterned dorsally.

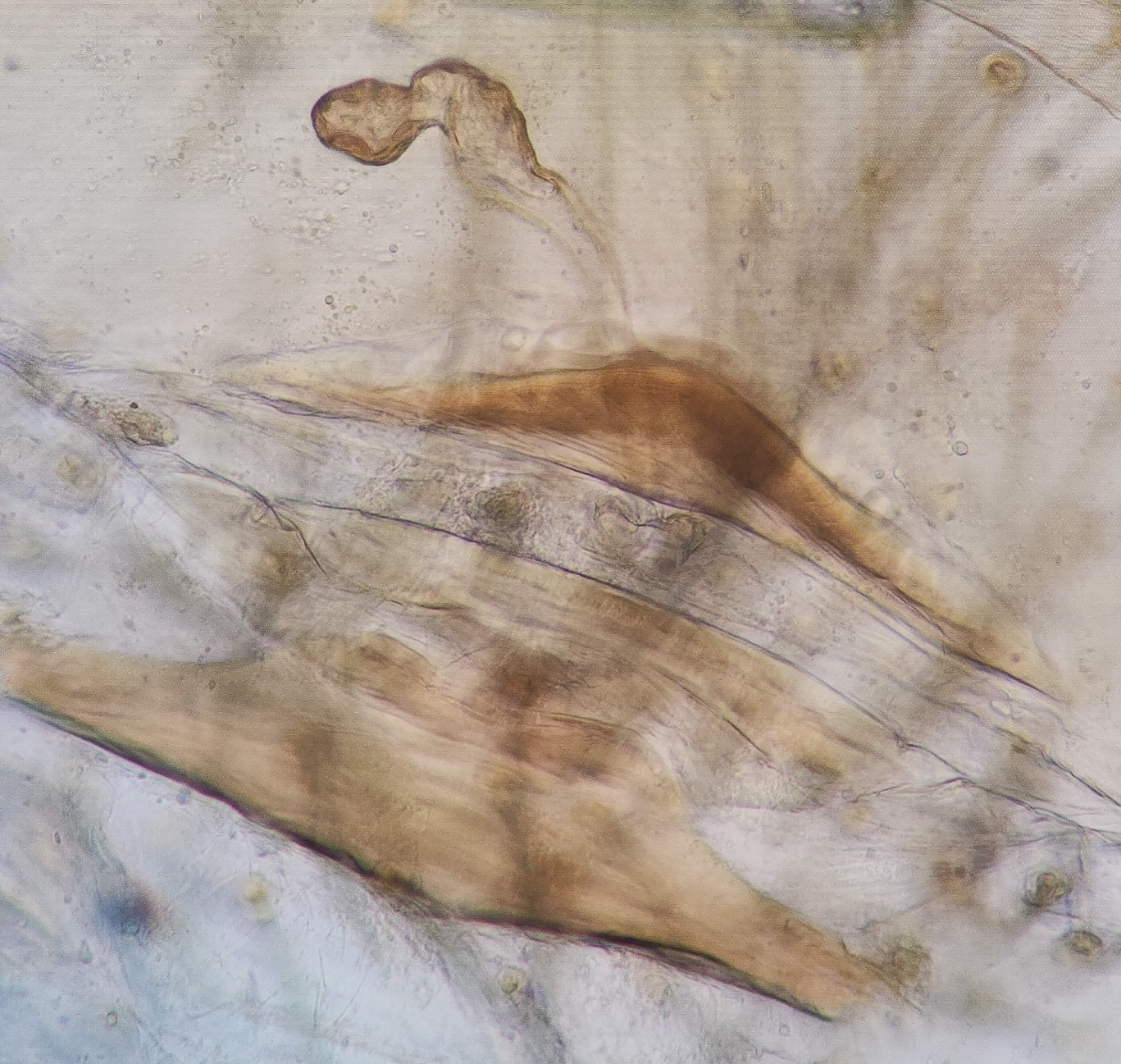
The extracted epigastric furrow displaying the atypical genital plan of the mature female W. graminicola

== Distribution ==
This species is only known from Otago, New Zealand. It is apparently restricted to tussock grasslands.

== Conservation status ==
Under the New Zealand Threat Classification System, this species is listed as "Naturally Uncommon" with the qualifier "Range Restricted".
