= Pounamuella insula =

Conservation status
- Naturally Uncommon (NZ TCS)

Scientific classification
- Kingdom: Animalia
- Phylum: Arthropoda
- Subphylum: Chelicerata
- Class: Arachnida
- Order: Araneae
- Infraorder: Araneomorphae
- Family: Orsolobidae
- Genus: Pounamuella
- Species: P. insula

Binomial name
- Pounamuella insula Forster & Platnick, 1985

Species of spider

Pounamuella insula is a species of Orsolobidae. The species is endemic to New Zealand.

== Taxonomy ==
This species was described in 1985 by Ray Forster and Norman Platnick from female specimens collected in Poor Knights Islands. The holotype is stored in the New Zealand Arthropod Collection under registration number NZAC03015000.

== Description ==
The female is recorded at 1.6mm in length.

== Distribution ==
This species is only known from Poor Knight Islands.

== Conservation status ==
Under the New Zealand Threat Classification System, this species is listed as "Naturally Uncommon" with the qualifiers "Island Endemic" and "One Location".
