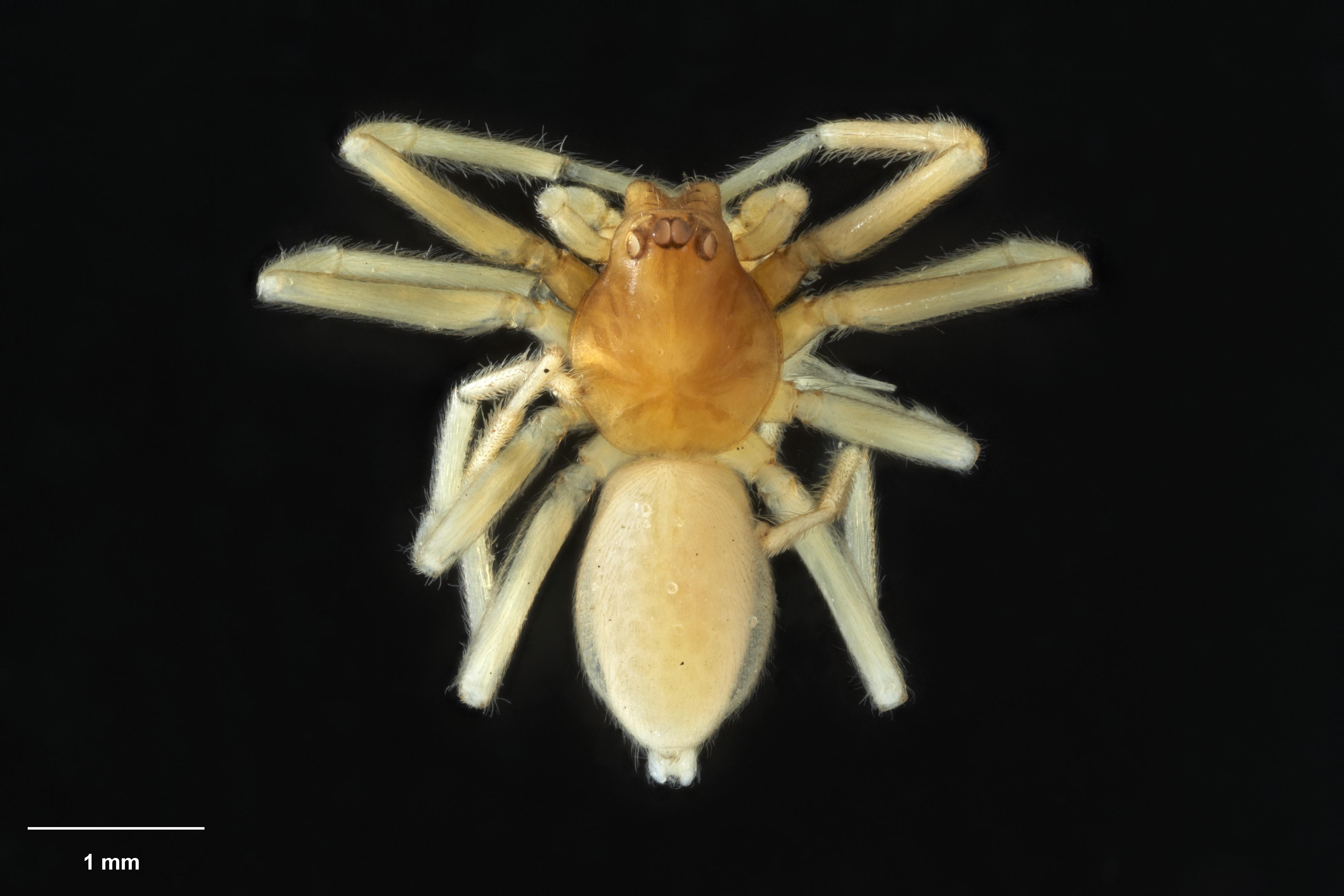

Conservation status
- Naturally Uncommon (NZ TCS)

Scientific classification
- Kingdom: Animalia
- Phylum: Arthropoda
- Subphylum: Chelicerata
- Class: Arachnida
- Order: Araneae
- Infraorder: Araneomorphae
- Family: Orsolobidae
- Genus: Subantarctia
- Species: S. florae

Binomial name
- Subantarctia florae Forster, 1956

= Subantarctia florae =

Species of spider

Subantarctia florae is a species of Orsolobidae. The species is endemic to New Zealand.

== Taxonomy ==
This species was described in 1956 by Ray Forster from male and female specimens collected in Nelson. The holotype is stored in Te Papa Museum under registration number AS.000030.

== Description ==
The male is recorded at 3.15mm in length whereas the female is 5.44mm. This species has reddish brown legs and carapace. The abdomen is uniform creamy white.

== Distribution ==
This species is known from throughout Nelson, New Zealand.

== Conservation status ==
Under the New Zealand Threat Classification System, this species is listed as "Naturally Uncommon" with the qualifier "Range Restricted".
