= Pounamuella ramsayi =

Conservation status
- Not Threatened (NZ TCS)

Scientific classification
- Kingdom: Animalia
- Phylum: Arthropoda
- Subphylum: Chelicerata
- Class: Arachnida
- Order: Araneae
- Infraorder: Araneomorphae
- Family: Orsolobidae
- Genus: Pounamuella
- Species: P. ramsayi

Binomial name
- Pounamuella ramsayi (Forster, 1956)

Synonyms
- Pounamua vulgaris ramsayi

Species of spider

Pounamuella ramsayi is a species of Orsolobidae. The species is endemic to New Zealand.

== Taxonomy ==
This species was described as Pounamua vulgaris ramsayi (a subspecies) in 1956 by Ray Forster from a male specimen collected in Fiordland. This subspecies was changed to a species in 1985. The holotype is stored in Canterbury Museum.

== Description ==
The male is recorded at 1.61mm whereas the female is recorded at 2.11mm. This male is coloured with pale yellow-brown legs, a brown carapace and a nearly uniform purple abdomen. The female is similar to the male.

== Distribution ==
This species is only known from Fiordland, New Zealand.

== Conservation status ==
Under the New Zealand Threat Classification System, this species is listed as "Not Threatened".
