= Pounamuella kuscheli =

Conservation status
- Data Deficit (NZ TCS)

Scientific classification
- Kingdom: Animalia
- Phylum: Arthropoda
- Subphylum: Chelicerata
- Class: Arachnida
- Order: Araneae
- Infraorder: Araneomorphae
- Family: Orsolobidae
- Genus: Pounamuella
- Species: P. kuscheli

Binomial name
- Pounamuella kuscheli Forster & Platnick, 1985

Species of spider

Pounamuella kuscheli is a species of Orsolobidae. The species is endemic to New Zealand.

== Taxonomy ==
This species was described in 1985 by Ray Forster and Norman Platnick from a male specimen collected in Auckland. The holotype is stored in the New Zealand Arthropod Collection under registration number NZAC03015001.

== Description ==
The male is recorded at 1.4mm in length.

== Distribution ==
This species is only known from Lynfield in Auckland, New Zealand.

== Conservation status ==
Under the New Zealand Threat Classification System, this species is listed as "Data Deficient" with the qualifiers "Data Poor: Size", "Data Poor: Trend" and "One Location".
