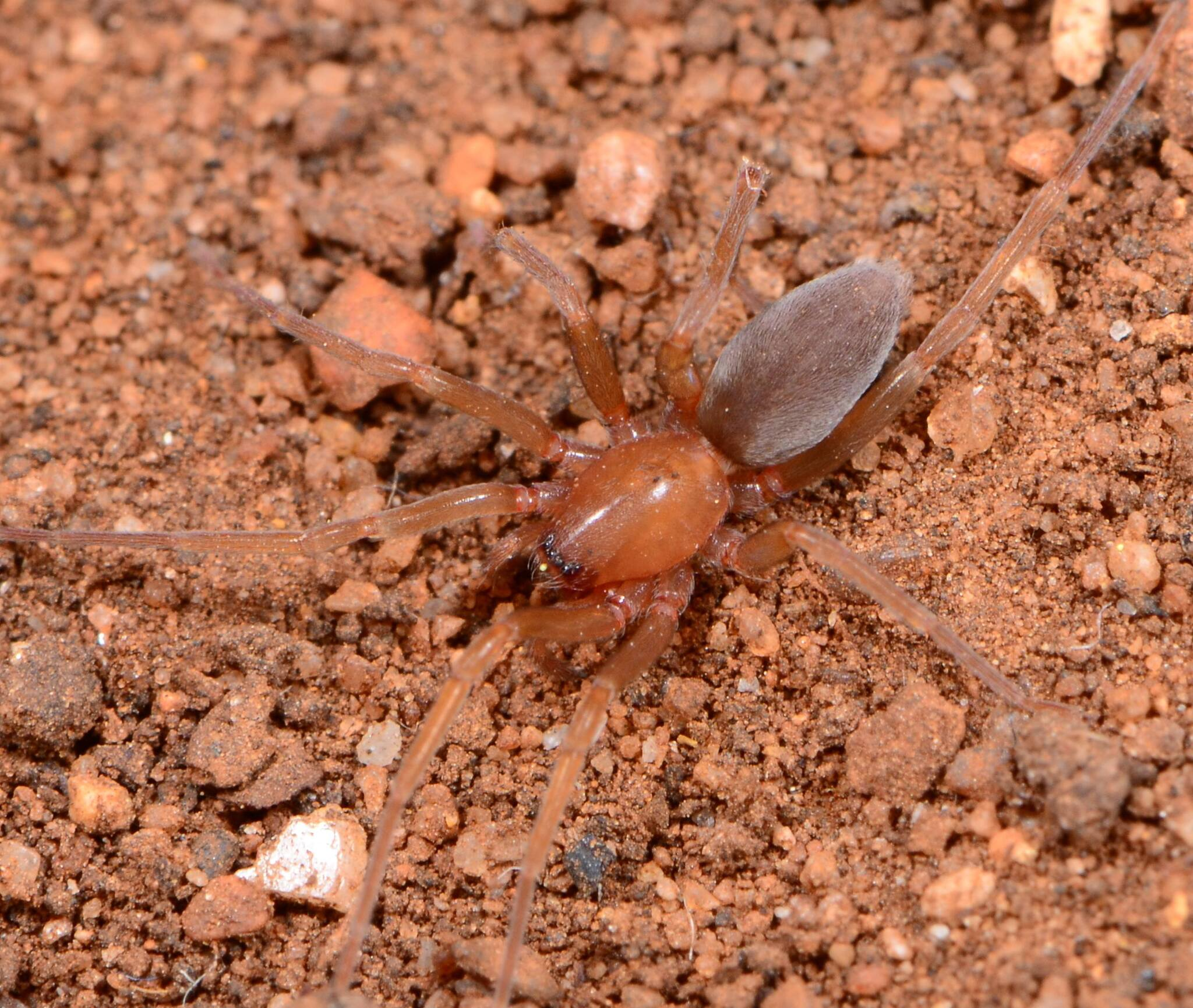
- Male
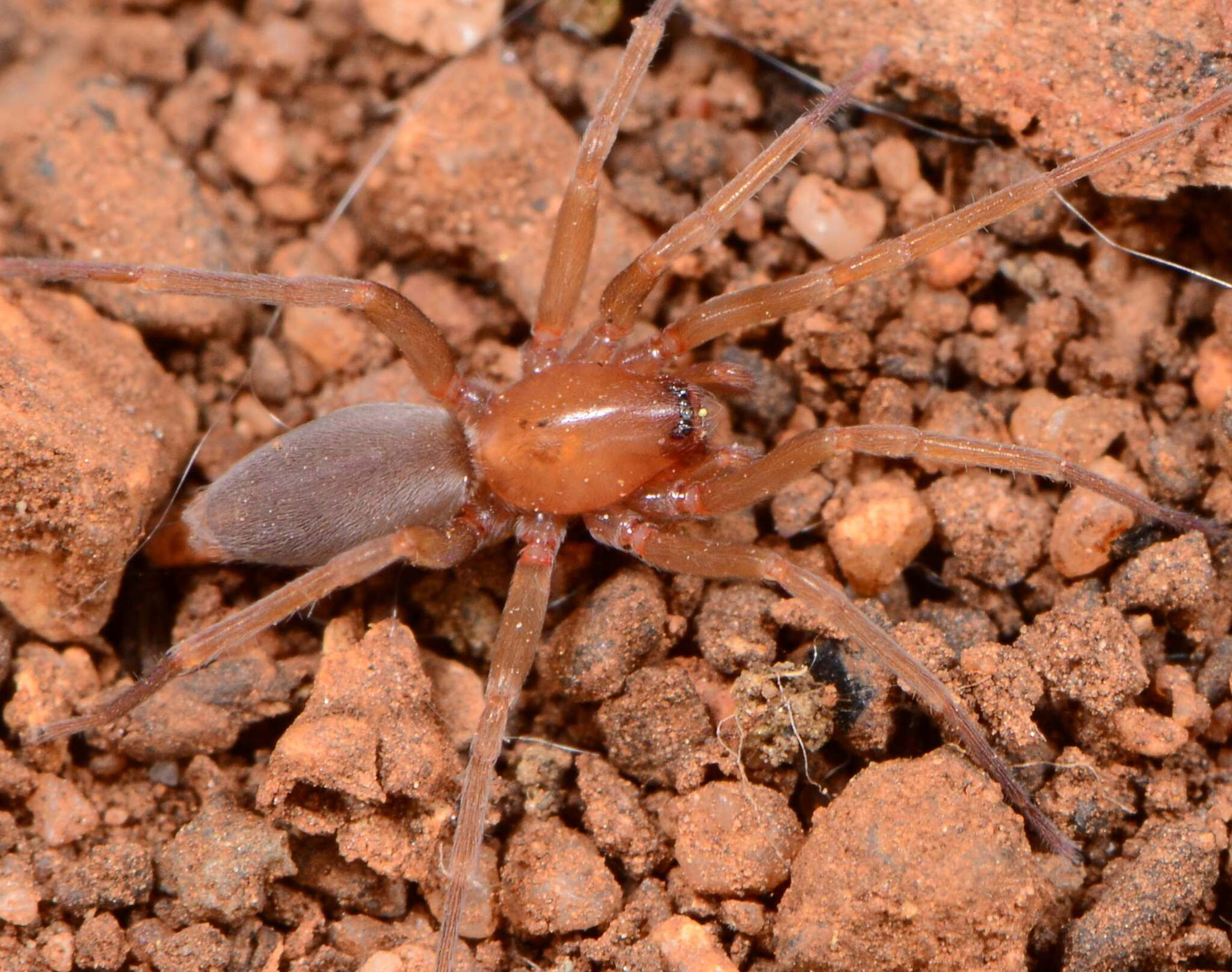
- Male

Scientific classification
- Kingdom: Animalia
- Phylum: Arthropoda
- Subphylum: Chelicerata
- Class: Arachnida
- Order: Araneae
- Infraorder: Araneomorphae
- Family: Orsolobidae
- Genus: Azanialobus
- Species: A. lawrencei

Binomial name
- Azanialobus lawrencei Griswold & Platnick, 1987

= Azanialobus =

Species of spider

Azanialobus lawrencei is a species of spider of the genus Azanialobus in the family Orsolobidae. It is the type species and the only species of its genus and is endemic to southern Africa, being found in South Africa and Lesotho.

== Etymology ==
The genus name represents a contraction of "Azania", an ancient term referring to the southeastern part of Africa, and Orsolobus, reflecting its relationship to other orsolobid genera.

The specific name lawrencei is a patronym honoring R. F. Lawrence, a collector of lycosids and pioneer in the study of the cryptic arthropods of the forests of southern Africa.

== Taxonomy ==
The genus Azanialobus was established by Charles Griswold and Norman Platnick in 1987, with A. lawrencei as the type species.

== Distribution ==
Azanialobus lawrencei has been recorded from South Africa and Lesotho. In South Africa, it has been documented from four provinces: Free State, KwaZulu-Natal, Limpopo, and Mpumalanga.

== Habitat ==
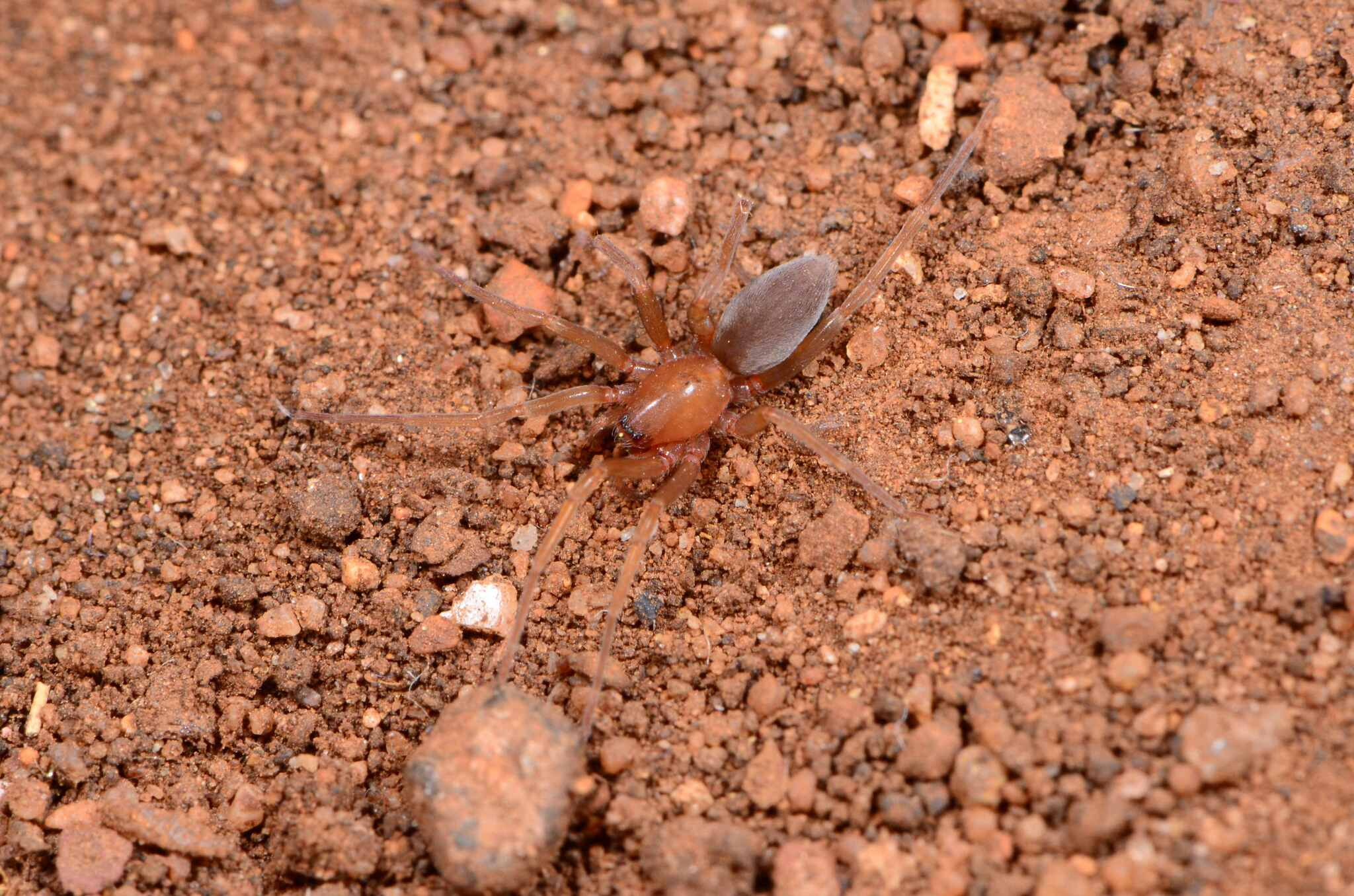
male

Azanialobus lawrencei is a free-running ground dweller found in Grassland, Forest, and Savanna biomes. The species has been collected from various locations including nature reserves, state forests, and mountainous areas such as the Drakensberg.

The species occurs at elevations ranging from 834 to 2,329 meters above sea level.

== Description ==
Azanialobus lawrencei is a relatively large orsolobid spider with a total length ranging from 3.4 (males) to 4.5 mm. The species is pale in coloration with uniform or absent abdominal markings, and both the body and legs are finely setose.

The cephalothorax, opisthosoma, and legs are pale yellowish white in preserved specimens, with black pigment surrounding the eyes and extending between the anterior lateral and posterior median eyes. The carapace is broadly oval and narrowed anteriorly, measuring about 1.2 times wider than long. The species has six eyes arranged with four in the anterior row and two in the posterior row.

The abdomen is cylindrical and lacks scuta, with faint mottling on the dorsum and a diffuse purple-brown ring surrounding the base of the spinnerets.

The legs are slender and equipped with two tarsal claws. The species can be distinguished from related genera by having spines on the legs and teeth on the claws extending beyond the lateral flange. The tarsal organ is positioned as a low mound with short cuticular lobes.

== Conservation status ==
In South Africa, Azanialobus lawrencei is classified as Least Concern due to its wide geographical range across multiple provinces and protection in several protected areas. No specific threats to the species have been identified.
