= Pounamuella vulgaris =

Conservation status
- Not Threatened (NZ TCS)

Scientific classification
- Kingdom: Animalia
- Phylum: Arthropoda
- Subphylum: Chelicerata
- Class: Arachnida
- Order: Araneae
- Infraorder: Araneomorphae
- Family: Orsolobidae
- Genus: Pounamuella
- Species: P. vulgaris

Binomial name
- Pounamuella vulgaris (Forster, 1956)

Synonyms
- Pounamua vulgaris

Species of spider

Pounamuella vulgaris is a species of Orsolobidae. The species is endemic to New Zealand.

== Taxonomy ==
This species was described as Pounamua vulgaris in 1956 by Ray Forster from male and female specimens collected in Fiordland. It was renamed as Pounamuella vulgaris in 1985. It is the type species for the Pounamuella genus. The holotype is stored in Canterbury Museum.

== Description ==
The male is recorded at 1.63mm in length whereas the female is 1.92mm. The male is coloured with pale brown legs, pale brown carapace with some purple shading and the abdomen has some purple pigment.

== Distribution ==
This species is only known from Fiordland, New Zealand.

== Conservation status ==
Under the New Zealand Threat Classification System, this species is listed as "Not Threatened".
