= Subantarctia stewartensis =

Conservation status
- Data Deficit (NZ TCS)

Scientific classification
- Kingdom: Animalia
- Phylum: Arthropoda
- Subphylum: Chelicerata
- Class: Arachnida
- Order: Araneae
- Infraorder: Araneomorphae
- Family: Orsolobidae
- Genus: Subantarctia
- Species: S. stewartensis

Binomial name
- Subantarctia stewartensis Forster, 1956

Species of spider

Subantarctia stewartensis is a species of Orsolobidae. The species is endemic to New Zealand.

== Taxonomy ==
This species was described in 1956 by Ray Forster from male and immature female specimens collected in Stewart Island. The holotype is stored in Canterbury Museum.

== Description ==
The male is recorded at 4.60mm in length. Adult females are not known, but an immature female was recorded as 2.74mm in length. This species has deep reddish brown legs and carapace whereas the abdomen is creamy white.

== Distribution ==
This species is only known from Stewart Island, New Zealand.

== Conservation status ==
Under the New Zealand Threat Classification System, this species is listed as "Data Deficient" with the qualifiers of "Data Poor: Size", "Data Poor: Trend" and "One Location".
