= Wiltonia lima =

Conservation status
- Data Deficit (NZ TCS)

Scientific classification
- Kingdom: Animalia
- Phylum: Arthropoda
- Subphylum: Chelicerata
- Class: Arachnida
- Order: Araneae
- Infraorder: Araneomorphae
- Family: Orsolobidae
- Genus: Wiltonia
- Species: W. lima

Binomial name
- Wiltonia lima Forster & Platnick, 1985

Species of spider

Wiltonia lima is a species of Orsolobidae that is endemic to New Zealand.

== Taxonomy ==
This species was described in 1985 by Ray Forster and Norman Platnick from male and female specimens collected in Canterbury. The holotype is stored in Otago Museum.

== Description ==
The male is recorded at 2.66mm in length whereas the female is 3.05mm. The carapace and abdomen are patterned dorsally.

== Distribution ==
This species is only known from Peel Forest in Canterbury, New Zealand.

== Conservation status ==
Under the New Zealand Threat Classification System, this species is listed as "Data Deficient" with the qualifiers of "Data Poor: Size", "Data Poor: Trend" and "One Location".
