= Calculus bicolor =

Calculus six-eyed ground spider

Scientific classification
- Kingdom: Animalia
- Phylum: Arthropoda
- Subphylum: Chelicerata
- Class: Arachnida
- Order: Araneae
- Infraorder: Araneomorphae
- Family: Orsolobidae
- Genus: Calculus; Purcell, 1910
- Species: C. bicolor

Binomial name
- Calculus bicolor Purcell, 1910

Species of spider

Calculus bicolor, the sole species of the genus Calculus, is a South African spider in the family Orsolobidae.

Individuals are 4 mm in length, although only juveniles have been described. The abdomen is pale yellow with a broad brown patch and black markings on the sides of the spinnerets. Calculus bicolor was described in 1910 by William F. Purcell, and long assigned to the Oonopidae (goblin spiders), until a 2012 study assigned Calculus to the family Orsolobidae on the basis of sensory organs that differed from those of oonopids.
