= Pounamuella hollowayae =

Conservation status
- Data Deficit (NZ TCS)

Scientific classification
- Kingdom: Animalia
- Phylum: Arthropoda
- Subphylum: Chelicerata
- Class: Arachnida
- Order: Araneae
- Infraorder: Araneomorphae
- Family: Orsolobidae
- Genus: Pounamuella
- Species: P. hollowayae

Binomial name
- Pounamuella hollowayae (Forster, 1956)

Synonyms
- Pounamua hollowayi

Species of spider

Pounamuella hollowayae is a species of Orsolobidae. The species is endemic to New Zealand.

== Taxonomy ==
This species was described as Pounamua hollowayi in 1956 by Ray Forster from male and female specimens collected in Fiordland. It was redescribed as Pounamuella hollowayae in 1985. The holotype is stored in Canterbury Museum.

== Description ==
The male is recorded at 1.41mm in length whereas the female is 2.01mm.

== Distribution ==
This species is only known from Fiordland, New Zealand.

== Conservation status ==
Under the New Zealand Threat Classification System, this species is listed as "Data Deficient" with the qualifiers of "Data Poor: Size", "Data Poor: Trend" and "One Location".
