= Orongia medialis =

Conservation status
- Data Deficit (NZ TCS)

Scientific classification
- Kingdom: Animalia
- Phylum: Arthropoda
- Subphylum: Chelicerata
- Class: Arachnida
- Order: Araneae
- Infraorder: Araneomorphae
- Family: Orsolobidae
- Genus: Orongia
- Species: O. medialis

Binomial name
- Orongia medialis Forster & Platnick, 1985

Species of spider

Orongia medialis is a species of Orsolobidae spider. The species is endemic to New Zealand.

== Taxonomy ==
This species was described in 1985 by Ray Forster and Norman Platnick from male and female specimens collected in Wellington. The holotype is stored in Otago Museum.

== Description ==
The female is recorded at 4.16 mm (0.164 in) in length.

== Distribution ==
This species is only known from Ōrongorongo Valley in Wellington, New Zealand.

== Conservation status ==
Under the New Zealand Threat Classification System, this species is listed as "Data Deficient" with the qualifiers "Data Poor: Size", "Data Poor: Trend" and "One Location".
