= Wiltonia elongata =

Conservation status
- Data Deficit (NZ TCS)

Scientific classification
- Kingdom: Animalia
- Phylum: Arthropoda
- Subphylum: Chelicerata
- Class: Arachnida
- Order: Araneae
- Infraorder: Araneomorphae
- Family: Orsolobidae
- Genus: Wiltonia
- Species: W. elongata

Binomial name
- Wiltonia elongata Forster & Platnick, 1985

Species of spider

Wiltonia elongata is a species of Orsolobidae that is endemic to New Zealand.

== Taxonomy ==
This species was described in 1985 by Ray Forster and Norman Platnick from a male specimen collected in Nelson. The holotype is stored in the New Zealand Arthropod Collection under registration number NZAC03015015.

== Description ==
The male is recorded at 3.44mm in length. This species has patterning on the dorsal surface of the carapace and abdomen.

== Distribution ==
This species is only known from Richmond Range in Nelson, New Zealand.

== Conservation status ==
Under the New Zealand Threat Classification System, this species is listed as "Data Deficient" with the qualifiers of "Data Poor: Size", "Data Poor: Trend" and "One Location".
