= Orongia whangamoa =

Conservation status
- Data Deficit (NZ TCS)

Scientific classification
- Kingdom: Animalia
- Phylum: Arthropoda
- Subphylum: Chelicerata
- Class: Arachnida
- Order: Araneae
- Infraorder: Araneomorphae
- Family: Orsolobidae
- Genus: Orongia
- Species: O. whangamoa

Binomial name
- Orongia whangamoa Forster & Platnick, 1985

Species of spider

Orongia whangamoa is a species of Orsolobidae spider. The species is endemic to New Zealand.

== Taxonomy ==
This species was described in 1985 by Ray Forster and Norman Platnick from male specimens collected in Nelson. The holotype is stored in the New Zealand Arthropod Collection under registration number NZAC03014999.

== Description ==
The male is recorded at 2.8 mm (0.11 in) in length.

== Distribution ==
This species is only known from Whangamoa in Nelson, New Zealand.

== Conservation status ==
Under the New Zealand Threat Classification System, this species is listed as "Data Deficient" with the qualifiers "Data Poor: Size", "Data Poor: Trend" and "One Location".
