= Subantarctia trina =

Conservation status
- Naturally Uncommon (NZ TCS)

Scientific classification
- Kingdom: Animalia
- Phylum: Arthropoda
- Subphylum: Chelicerata
- Class: Arachnida
- Order: Araneae
- Infraorder: Araneomorphae
- Family: Orsolobidae
- Genus: Subantarctia
- Species: S. trina

Binomial name
- Subantarctia trina Forster & Platnick, 1985

Species of spider

Subantarctia trina is a species of Orsolobidae. The species is endemic to New Zealand.

== Taxonomy ==
This species was described in 1985 by Ray Forster and Norman Platnick from male and female specimens collected near Dunedin. The holotype is stored in Otago Museum.

== Description ==
The male is recorded at 4.08mm in length whereas the female is 5.20mm.

== Distribution ==
This species is restricted to the coastal area of Otago, New Zealand.

== Conservation status ==
Under the New Zealand Threat Classification System, this species is listed as "Naturally Uncommon" with the qualifiers "Range Restricted".
