= Afrilobus jocquei =

Scientific classification
- Kingdom: Animalia
- Phylum: Arthropoda
- Subphylum: Chelicerata
- Class: Arachnida
- Order: Araneae
- Infraorder: Araneomorphae
- Family: Orsolobidae
- Genus: Afrilobus
- Species: A. jocquei

Binomial name
- Afrilobus jocquei Griswold & Platnick, 1987

Species of spider

Afrilobus jocquei is a species of spider in the family Orsolobidae. It is endemic to Malawi.

== Taxonomy ==
Afrilobus jocquei was first described by Charles E. Griswold and Norman I. Platnick in 1987 as part of their work on the first African spiders of the family Orsolobidae. The species belongs to the genus Afrilobus, a genus of African orsolobid spiders.

== Etymology ==
The specific name jocquei is a patronym honoring R. Jocqué, the collector of the type series.

== Distribution ==
Afrilobus jocquei is known from montane regions of northern and southern Malawi, including Mount Mulanje, Lichenya plateau, Nyika Plateau, and other high-elevation localities.

== Habitat ==
The species has been collected from montane habitats at elevations ranging from 1800 to 2820 meters above sea level. Collection localities include evergreen forests, pine plantations, and other montane environments.

== Description ==
Only males of Afrilobus jocquei are currently known.

Males have a total length of 3.41 mm. The cephalothorax is yellow with black pigmentation along the margins of the eyes. The pars thoracica bears faint radial reticulations and paired dark central marks. The chelicerae, mouthparts, and sternum are yellow. The opisthosoma is white with faint purple mottling on the upper surface, broken posteriorly by white hairline chevrons, and purple coloration around the base of the spinnerets.

The legs and pedipalps are yellow-white, with the femora of legs I and II being dusky at their tips. The patellae of legs I-III have posterior dark longitudinal bands. The leg formula is 4213.

Males can be distinguished from those of related species A. capensis by their less elaborate pedipalps and by having the tarsal organ with more than 10 cuticular lobes. They differ from A. australis by having posterior dark longitudinal bands on patellae I-III and lacking dorsolateral apical maculations on the femora.

The palpal bulb is slender with ventral concavity, and the embolus is slender and curved, with a flattened, bifurcate conductor.
