= Pounamuella complexa =

Conservation status
- Not Threatened (NZ TCS)

Scientific classification
- Kingdom: Animalia
- Phylum: Arthropoda
- Subphylum: Chelicerata
- Class: Arachnida
- Order: Araneae
- Infraorder: Araneomorphae
- Family: Orsolobidae
- Genus: Pounamuella
- Species: P. complexa

Binomial name
- Pounamuella complexa (Forster, 1956)

Synonyms
- Pounamua complexa

Species of spider

Pounamuella complexa is a species of Orsolobidae. The species is endemic to New Zealand.

== Taxonomy ==
This species was described as Pounamua complexa in 1956 by Ray Forster from male specimens collected in Fiordland. It was redescribed as Pounamuella complexa in 1985.

== Distribution ==
This species is only known from Fiordland, New Zealand.

== Conservation status ==
Under the New Zealand Threat Classification System, this species is listed as "Not Threatened".
