= Subantarctia turbotti =

Conservation status
- Naturally Uncommon (NZ TCS)

Scientific classification
- Kingdom: Animalia
- Phylum: Arthropoda
- Subphylum: Chelicerata
- Class: Arachnida
- Order: Araneae
- Infraorder: Araneomorphae
- Family: Orsolobidae
- Genus: Subantarctia
- Species: S. turbotti

Binomial name
- Subantarctia turbotti Forster, 1955

Species of spider

Subantarctia turbotti is a species of spider in the family Orsolobidae. The species is endemic to New Zealand.

== Taxonomy ==
This species was described in 1955 by Ray Forster from female specimens collected on Auckland Island. The species was redescribed in 1964 to include male specimens. The holotype is stored in Auckland War Memorial Museum under registration number AMNZ5066. The species was named after Auckland War Memorial Museum director Graham Turbott.

== Description ==
The male is recorded at 3.53 mm (0.139 in) in length whereas the female is 8.01 mm (0.315 in). The female has yellowish brown legs, dark reddish brown carapace and uniform creamy white. In contrast, the male has bright reddish brown legs and carapace.

== Distribution ==
This species is only known from Auckland Island in New Zealand.

== Conservation status ==
Under the New Zealand Threat Classification System, this species is listed as "Naturally Uncommon" with the qualifiers of "Island Endemic" and "One Location".
