= Subantarctia dugdalei =

Conservation status
- Data Deficit (NZ TCS)

Scientific classification
- Kingdom: Animalia
- Phylum: Arthropoda
- Subphylum: Chelicerata
- Class: Arachnida
- Order: Araneae
- Infraorder: Araneomorphae
- Family: Orsolobidae
- Genus: Subantarctia
- Species: S. dugdalei

Binomial name
- Subantarctia dugdalei Forster, 1956

Species of spider

Subantarctia dugdalei is a species of Orsolobidae. The species is endemic to New Zealand.

== Taxonomy ==
This species was described in 1956 by Ray Forster from male and female specimens collected in Christchurch. The holotype is stored in Canterbury Museum.

== Description ==
The male is recorded at 3.99mm in length whereas the female is 4.18mm. This species has pale orange legs, a dark reddish brown carapace and a uniform white abdomen.

== Distribution ==
This species is only known from central Canterbury, New Zealand.

== Conservation status ==
Under the New Zealand Threat Classification System, this species is listed as "Data Deficient" with the qualifiers of "Data Poor: Size" and "Data Poor: Trend".
