= Chileolobus =

Scientific classification
- Kingdom: Animalia
- Phylum: Arthropoda
- Subphylum: Chelicerata
- Class: Arachnida
- Order: Araneae
- Infraorder: Araneomorphae
- Family: Orsolobidae
- Genus: Chileolobus; Forster & Platnick, 1985
- Species: C. eden

Binomial name
- Chileolobus eden Forster & Platnick, 1985

Genus of spiders

Chileolobus is a monotypic genus of Chilean araneomorph spiders in the family Orsolobidae containing the single species, Chileolobus eden. It was first described by Raymond Robert Forster & Norman I. Platnick in 1985, and is only found in Chile.
