= Dugdalea =

Conservation status
- Data Deficit (NZ TCS)

Scientific classification
- Kingdom: Animalia
- Phylum: Arthropoda
- Subphylum: Chelicerata
- Class: Arachnida
- Order: Araneae
- Infraorder: Araneomorphae
- Family: Orsolobidae
- Genus: Dugdalea; Forster & Platnick, 1985
- Species: D. oculata

Binomial name
- Dugdalea oculata Forster & Platnick, 1985

Genus of spiders

Dugdalea is a monotypic genus of Polynesian araneomorph spiders in the family Orsolobidae containing the single species, Dugdalea oculata. It was first described by Raymond Robert Forster & Norman I. Platnick in 1985, and is only found in New Zealand.

== Taxonomy ==
This species was described in 1985 by Ray Forster and Norman Platnick from male and immature specimen collected in Inangahua. The holotype is stored in the New Zealand Arthropod Collection under registration number NZAC03014992.

== Description ==
The male is recorded at 2.48mm in length. The carapace and abdomen are patterned dorsally.

== Distribution ==
This species is only known Inangahua, New Zealand.

== Conservation status ==
Under the New Zealand Threat Classification System, this species is listed as "Data Deficient" with the qualifiers of "Data Poor: Size", "Data Poor: Trend" and "One Location".
