= Afrilobus =

Scientific classification
- Kingdom: Animalia
- Phylum: Arthropoda
- Subphylum: Chelicerata
- Class: Arachnida
- Order: Araneae
- Infraorder: Araneomorphae
- Family: Orsolobidae
- Genus: Afrilobus; Griswold & Platnick, 1987

Type species
- A. capensis Griswold & Platnick, 1987

Species
- 3, see text

Genus of spiders

Afrilobus is a genus of African araneomorph spiders in the family Orsolobidae, with three species from southern Africa. It was first described by C. E. Griswold & Norman I. Platnick in 1987.

== Species ==
As of October 2025, this genus includes three species:

- Afrilobus australis Griswold & Platnick, 1987 – South Africa
- Afrilobus capensis Griswold & Platnick, 1987 – South Africa (type species)
- Afrilobus jocquei Griswold & Platnick, 1987 – Malawi
