= Osornolobus =

Scientific classification
- Kingdom: Animalia
- Phylum: Arthropoda
- Subphylum: Chelicerata
- Class: Arachnida
- Order: Araneae
- Infraorder: Araneomorphae
- Family: Orsolobidae
- Genus: Osornolobus; Forster & Platnick, 1985

Type species
- O. canan Forster & Platnick, 1985

Species
- 17, see text

Genus of spiders

Osornolobus is a genus of Chilean araneomorph spiders in the family Orsolobidae, and was first described by Raymond Robert Forster & Norman I. Platnick in 1985.

== Species ==
As of June 2019 it contains seventeen species, found only in Chile:

- Osornolobus anticura Forster & Platnick, 1985 – Chile
- Osornolobus antillanca Forster & Platnick, 1985 – Chile
- Osornolobus canan Forster & Platnick, 1985 (type) – Chile
- Osornolobus cautin Forster & Platnick, 1985 – Chile
- Osornolobus cekalovici Forster & Platnick, 1985 – Chile
- Osornolobus chaiten Forster & Platnick, 1985 – Chile
- Osornolobus chapo Forster & Platnick, 1985 – Chile
- Osornolobus chiloe Forster & Platnick, 1985 – Chile
- Osornolobus concepcion Forster & Platnick, 1985 – Chile
- Osornolobus correntoso Forster & Platnick, 1985 – Chile
- Osornolobus magallanes Forster & Platnick, 1985 – Chile
- Osornolobus malalcahuello Forster & Platnick, 1985 – Chile
- Osornolobus nahuelbuta Forster & Platnick, 1985 – Chile
- Osornolobus newtoni Forster & Platnick, 1985 – Chile
- Osornolobus penai Forster & Platnick, 1985 – Chile
- Osornolobus thayerae Forster & Platnick, 1985 – Chile
- Osornolobus trancas Forster & Platnick, 1985 – Chile
