= Maoriata montana =

Conservation status
- Data Deficit (NZ TCS)

Scientific classification
- Kingdom: Animalia
- Phylum: Arthropoda
- Subphylum: Chelicerata
- Class: Arachnida
- Order: Araneae
- Infraorder: Araneomorphae
- Family: Orsolobidae
- Genus: Maoriata
- Species: M. montana

Binomial name
- Maoriata montana Forster & Platnick, 1985

Species of spider

Maoriata montana is a species of Orsolobidae spider. The species is endemic to New Zealand.

== Taxonomy ==
This species was described in 1985 by Ray Forster and Norman Platnick from female specimens collected in Otago. The holotype is stored in Otago Museum.

== Description ==
The female is recorded at 4.41 mm (0.174 in) in length. The abdomen has a poorly defined chevron pattern dorsally.

== Distribution and habitat ==
This species is only known from Otago, New Zealand. It is apparently restricted to subalpine habitats.

== Conservation status ==
Under the New Zealand Threat Classification System, this species is listed as "Data Deficient" with the qualifiers of "Data Poor: Size" and "Data Poor: Trend".
