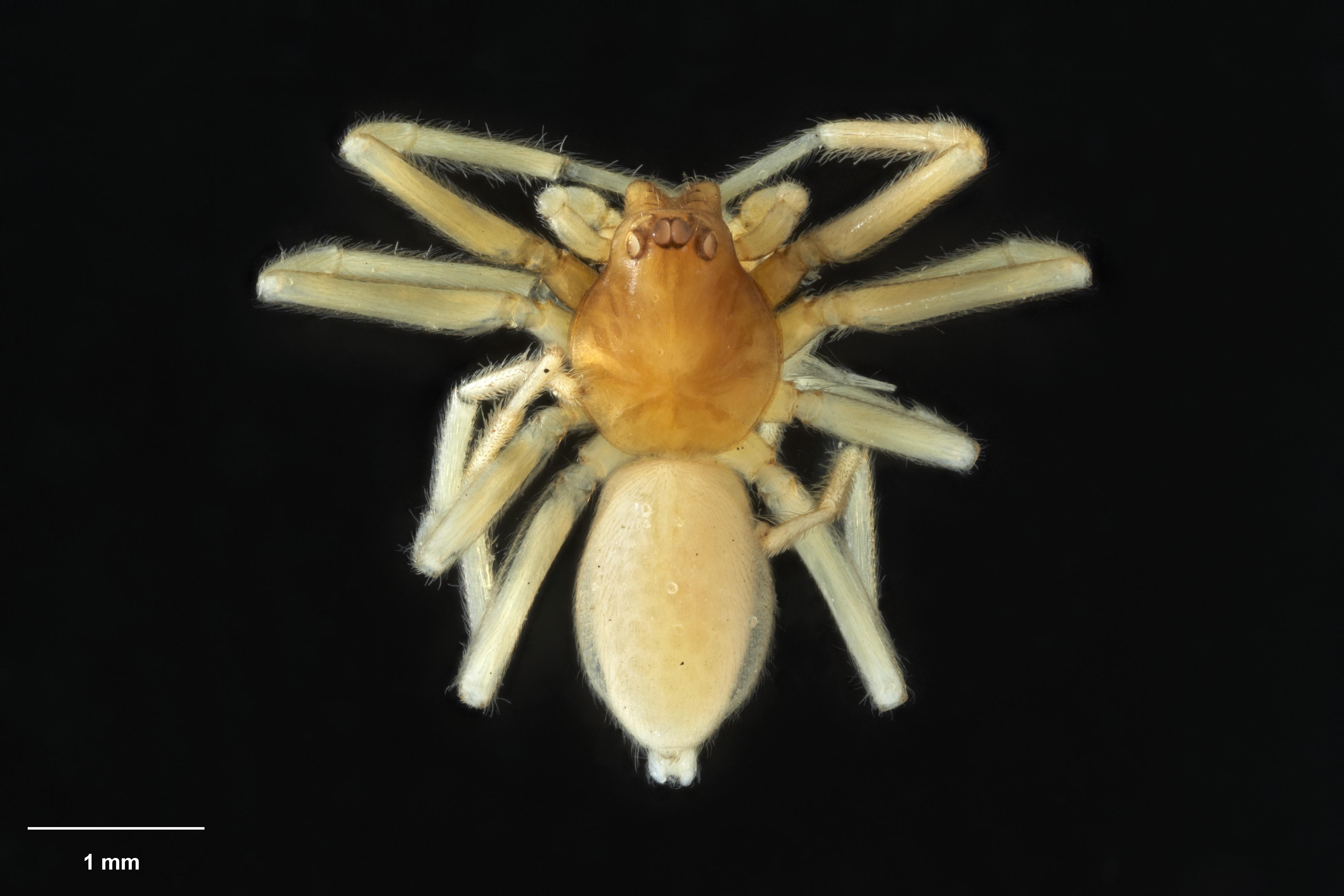

Scientific classification
- Kingdom: Animalia
- Phylum: Arthropoda
- Subphylum: Chelicerata
- Class: Arachnida
- Order: Araneae
- Infraorder: Araneomorphae
- Family: Orsolobidae
- Genus: Subantarctia; Forster, 1955

Type species
- S. turbotti Forster, 1955

Species
- 9, see text

= Subantarctia =

Genus of spiders

Subantarctia is a genus of Polynesian araneomorph spiders in the family Orsolobidae, first described by Raymond Robert Forster in 1955.

== Species ==
As of June 2019 it contains nine species, found only in New Zealand:

- Subantarctia centralis Forster & Platnick, 1985 – New Zealand
- Subantarctia dugdalei Forster, 1956 – New Zealand
- Subantarctia fiordensis Forster, 1956 – New Zealand
- Subantarctia florae Forster, 1956 – New Zealand
- Subantarctia muka Forster & Platnick, 1985 – New Zealand
- Subantarctia penara Forster & Platnick, 1985 – New Zealand
- Subantarctia stewartensis Forster, 1956 – New Zealand
- Subantarctia trina Forster & Platnick, 1985 – New Zealand
- Subantarctia turbotti Forster, 1955 (type) – New Zealand (Auckland Is.)
