= Paralobus =

Conservation status
- Not Threatened (NZ TCS)

Scientific classification
- Kingdom: Animalia
- Phylum: Arthropoda
- Subphylum: Chelicerata
- Class: Arachnida
- Order: Araneae
- Infraorder: Araneomorphae
- Family: Orsolobidae
- Genus: Paralobus; Forster & Platnick, 1985
- Species: P. salmoni

Binomial name
- Paralobus salmoni (Forster, 1956)

Genus of spiders

Paralobus is a monotypic genus of Polynesian araneomorph spiders in the family Orsolobidae containing the single species, Paralobus salmoni. It was first described by Raymond Robert Forster & Norman I. Platnick in 1985, and is only found in New Zealand.
