= Maoriata =

Scientific classification
- Kingdom: Animalia
- Phylum: Arthropoda
- Subphylum: Chelicerata
- Class: Arachnida
- Order: Araneae
- Infraorder: Araneomorphae
- Family: Orsolobidae
- Genus: Maoriata; Forster & Platnick, 1985

Type species
- M. magna (Forster, 1956)

Species
- M. magna (Forster, 1956) – New Zealand; M. montana Forster & Platnick, 1985 – New Zealand; M. vulgaris Forster & Platnick, 1985 – New Zealand

Genus of spiders

Maoriata is a genus of Polynesian araneomorph spiders in the family Orsolobidae, and was first described by Raymond Robert Forster & Norman I. Platnick in 1985. As of June 2019 it contains only three species, found only in New Zealand.

== Species ==
- Maoriata magna (Forster, 1956)
- Maoriata montana Forster & Platnick, 1985
- Maoriata vulgaris Forster & Platnick, 1985
