= Cornifalx =

Scientific classification
- Kingdom: Animalia
- Phylum: Arthropoda
- Subphylum: Chelicerata
- Class: Arachnida
- Order: Araneae
- Infraorder: Araneomorphae
- Family: Orsolobidae
- Genus: Cornifalx; Hickman, 1979
- Species: C. insignis

Binomial name
- Cornifalx insignis Hickman, 1979

Genus of spiders

Cornifalx is a monotypic genus of Tasmanian araneomorph spiders in the family Orsolobidae containing the single species, Cornifalx insignis. It was first described by V. V. Hickman in 1979, and is only found in Tasmania.
