= Basibulbus =

Scientific classification
- Kingdom: Animalia
- Phylum: Arthropoda
- Subphylum: Chelicerata
- Class: Arachnida
- Order: Araneae
- Infraorder: Araneomorphae
- Family: Orsolobidae
- Genus: Basibulbus; Ott, Platnick, Berniker & Bonaldo, 2013

Type species
- B. malleco Ott, Platnick, Berniker & Bonaldo, 2013

Species
- B. concepcion Ott, Platnick, Berniker & Bonaldo, 2013 – Chile; B. granizo Ott, Platnick, Berniker & Bonaldo, 2013 – Chile; B. malleco Ott, Platnick, Berniker & Bonaldo, 2013 – Chile

Genus of spiders

Basibulbus is a genus of Chilean araneomorph spiders in the family Orsolobidae, and was first described by R. Ott in 2013. As of June 2019 it contains only three species, found only in Chile: B. concepcion, B. granizo, and B. malleco.
