= Orongia =

Scientific classification
- Kingdom: Animalia
- Phylum: Arthropoda
- Subphylum: Chelicerata
- Class: Arachnida
- Order: Araneae
- Infraorder: Araneomorphae
- Family: Orsolobidae
- Genus: Orongia; Forster & Platnick, 1985

Type species
- O. medialis Forster & Platnick, 1985

Species
- O. medialis Forster & Platnick, 1985 – New Zealand; O. motueka Forster & Platnick, 1985 – New Zealand; O. whangamoa Forster & Platnick, 1985 – New Zealand

Genus of spiders

Orongia is a genus of Polynesian araneomorph spiders in the family Orsolobidae, and was first described by Raymond Robert Forster & Norman I. Platnick in 1985. As of June 2019 it contains only three species, found only in New Zealand.

== Species ==
- Orongia medialis Forster & Platnick, 1985
- Orongia motueka Forster & Platnick, 1985
- Orongia whangamoa Forster & Platnick, 1985
