= Maoriata magna =

Conservation status
- Not Threatened (NZ TCS)

Scientific classification
- Kingdom: Animalia
- Phylum: Arthropoda
- Subphylum: Chelicerata
- Class: Arachnida
- Order: Araneae
- Infraorder: Araneomorphae
- Family: Orsolobidae
- Genus: Maoriata
- Species: M. magna

Binomial name
- Maoriata magna (Forster, 1956)

Synonyms
- Ascuta magna

Species of spider

Maoriata magna is a species of Orsolobidae spider. The species is endemic to New Zealand.

== Taxonomy ==
This species was described as "Ascuta magna" in 1956 by Ray Forster from male and female specimens collected in Fiordland. In 1985, the species was made the type species of Maoriata. The holotype is stored in Canterbury Museum.

== Description ==
The male is recorded at 4.2 mm (0.17 in) in length whereas the female is 4.35 mm (0.171 in). This species has a dark yellowish carapace, pale brown legs and creamy white coloured abdomen with a chevron pattern dorsally.

== Distribution ==
This species is only known from Fiordland, New Zealand.

== Conservation status ==
Under the New Zealand Threat Classification System, this species is listed as "Not Threatened".
