= Australobus =

Scientific classification
- Kingdom: Animalia
- Phylum: Arthropoda
- Subphylum: Chelicerata
- Class: Arachnida
- Order: Araneae
- Infraorder: Araneomorphae
- Family: Orsolobidae
- Genus: Australobus; Forster & Platnick, 1985
- Species: A. torbay

Binomial name
- Australobus torbay Forster & Platnick, 1985

Genus of spiders

Australobus is a monotypic genus of Western Australian araneomorph spiders in the family Orsolobidae containing the single species, Australobus torbay. It was first described by Raymond Robert Forster & Norman I. Platnick in 1985, and is only found in Western Australia.
