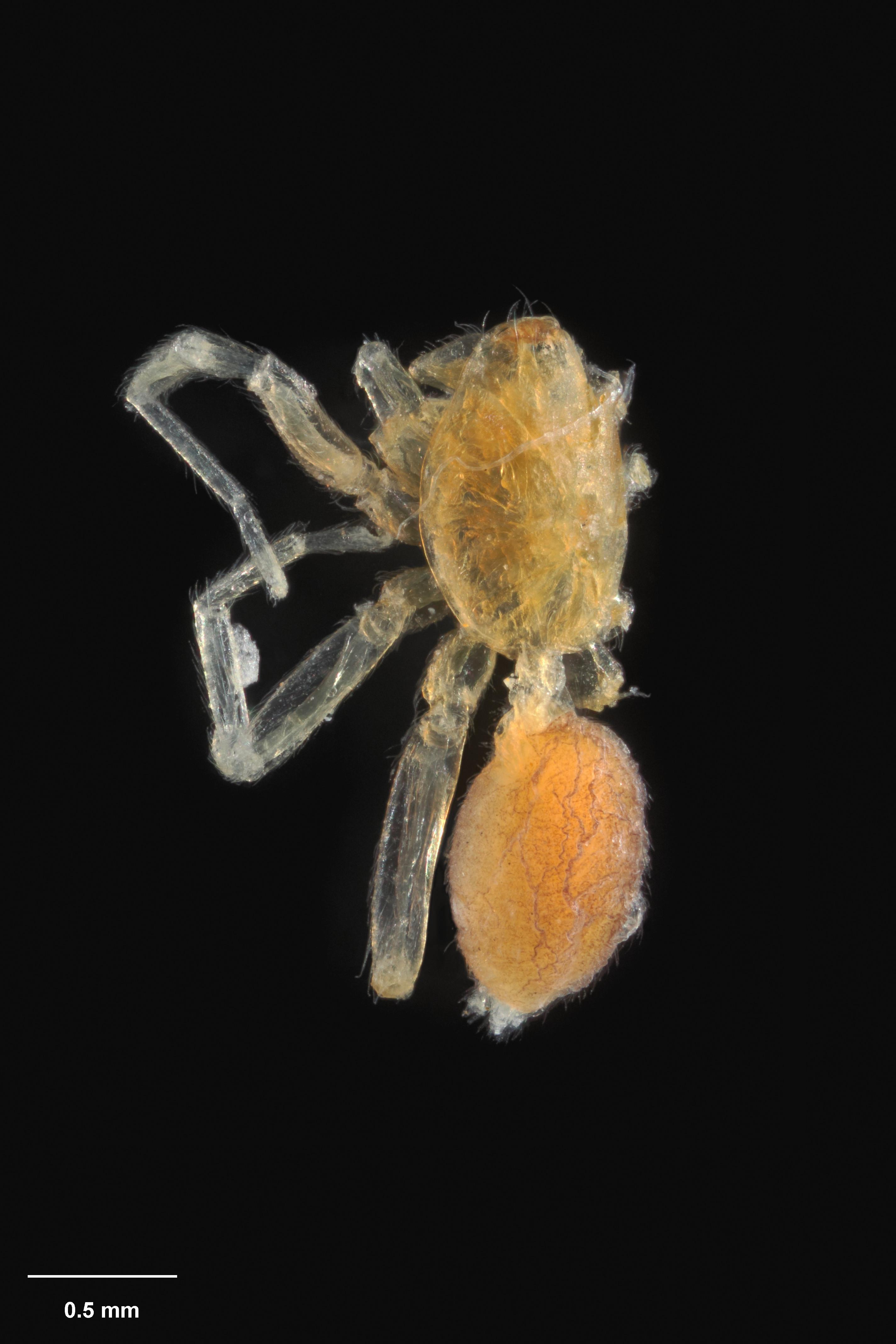
- Pounamuella australis

Scientific classification
- Kingdom: Animalia
- Phylum: Arthropoda
- Subphylum: Chelicerata
- Class: Arachnida
- Order: Araneae
- Infraorder: Araneomorphae
- Family: Orsolobidae
- Genus: Pounamuella; Forster & Platnick, 1985

Type species
- P. vulgaris (Forster, 1956)

Species
- 8, see text

Synonyms
- Pounamua

= Pounamuella =

Genus of spiders

Pounamuella is a genus of Polynesian araneomorph spiders in the family Orsolobidae, and was first described by Raymond Robert Forster & Norman I. Platnick in 1985.

== Species ==
As of June 2019 it contains eight species, found only in New Zealand:

- Pounamuella australis (Forster, 1964) – New Zealand (Auckland Is.)
- Pounamuella complexa (Forster, 1956) – New Zealand
- Pounamuella hauroko Forster & Platnick, 1985 – New Zealand
- Pounamuella hollowayae (Forster, 1956) – New Zealand
- Pounamuella insula Forster & Platnick, 1985 – New Zealand
- Pounamuella kuscheli Forster & Platnick, 1985 – New Zealand
- Pounamuella ramsayi (Forster, 1956) – New Zealand
- Pounamuella vulgaris (Forster, 1956) (type) – New Zealand
