= Bealeyia =

Conservation status
- Data Deficit (NZ TCS)

Scientific classification
- Kingdom: Animalia
- Phylum: Arthropoda
- Subphylum: Chelicerata
- Class: Arachnida
- Order: Araneae
- Infraorder: Araneomorphae
- Family: Orsolobidae
- Genus: Bealeyia; Forster & Platnick, 1985
- Species: B. unicolor

Binomial name
- Bealeyia unicolor Forster & Platnick, 1985

Genus of spiders

Bealeyia is a monotypic genus of Polynesian araneomorph spiders in the family orsolobidae containing the single species, Bealeyia unicolor. It was first described by Raymond Robert Forster & Norman I. Platnick in 1985, and is only found in New Zealand.

== Taxonomy ==
This species was described in 1985 by Ray Forster and Norman Platnick from male and female specimens collected in Arthurs Pass. The holotype is stored in Otago Museum.

== Description ==
The male is recorded at 2.88 mm (0.113 in) in length whereas the female is 3.52 mm (0.139 in). The carapace is patterned dorsally.

== Distribution ==
This species is only known from Arthurs Pass, New Zealand.

== Conservation status ==
Under the New Zealand Threat Classification System, this species is listed as "Data Deficient" with the qualifiers of "Data Poor: Size", "Data Poor: Trend" and "One Location".
