= Falklandia =

Scientific classification
- Kingdom: Animalia
- Phylum: Arthropoda
- Subphylum: Chelicerata
- Class: Arachnida
- Order: Araneae
- Infraorder: Araneomorphae
- Family: Orsolobidae
- Genus: Falklandia; Forster & Platnick, 1985
- Species: F. rumbolli

Binomial name
- Falklandia rumbolli (Schiapelli & Gerschman, 1974)

Genus of spiders

Falklandia is a monotypic genus of araneomorph spiders in the family Orsolobidae containing the single species, Falklandia rumbolli. It was first described by Raymond Robert Forster & Norman I. Platnick in 1985, and is only found on the Falkland Islands.
