= Wiltonia =

Scientific classification
- Kingdom: Animalia
- Phylum: Arthropoda
- Subphylum: Chelicerata
- Class: Arachnida
- Order: Araneae
- Infraorder: Araneomorphae
- Family: Orsolobidae
- Genus: Wiltonia; Forster & Platnick, 1985

Type species
- W. graminicola Forster & Platnick, 1985

Species
- 9, see text

Genus of spiders

Wiltonia is a genus of Polynesian araneomorph spiders in the family Orsolobidae, and was first described by Raymond Robert Forster & Norman I. Platnick in 1985.

== Species ==
As of June 2019 it contains nine species, found only in New Zealand:

- Wiltonia elongata Forster & Platnick, 1985 – New Zealand
- Wiltonia eylesi Forster & Platnick, 1985 – New Zealand
- Wiltonia fiordensis Forster & Platnick, 1985 – New Zealand
- Wiltonia graminicola Forster & Platnick, 1985 (type) – New Zealand
- Wiltonia lima Forster & Platnick, 1985 – New Zealand
- Wiltonia nelsonensis Forster & Platnick, 1985 – New Zealand
- Wiltonia pecki Forster & Platnick, 1985 – New Zealand
- Wiltonia porina Forster & Platnick, 1985 – New Zealand
- Wiltonia rotoiti Forster & Platnick, 1985 – New Zealand
