= Afrilobus capensis =

Cape Six-Eyed Ground Spider

Conservation status
- Least Concern (SANBI Red List)

Scientific classification
- Kingdom: Animalia
- Phylum: Arthropoda
- Subphylum: Chelicerata
- Class: Arachnida
- Order: Araneae
- Infraorder: Araneomorphae
- Family: Orsolobidae
- Genus: Afrilobus
- Species: A. capensis

Binomial name
- Afrilobus capensis Griswold & Platnick, 1987

Species of spider

Afrilobus capensis is a species of spider in the family Orsolobidae. It is endemic to South Africa and is commonly known as the Cape Six-Eyed Ground Spider.

== Taxonomy ==
Afrilobus capensis was first described in 1987 by Charles E. Griswold and Norman I. Platnick from specimens collected in the Cederberg Mountains of the Western Cape. It serves as the type species for the genus Afrilobus.

== Etymology ==
The specific name capensis refers to the Cape Province, the type locality where the species was first discovered.

== Distribution and habitat ==
Afrilobus capensis is known from two provinces in South Africa: the Western Cape and Northern Cape. The species has been recorded from the Cederberg Wilderness Area in the Western Cape and Namaqua National Park in the Northern Cape.

The spider inhabits elevations ranging from 176 to 1,557 meters above sea level. It is found in both Fynbos and Succulent Karoo biomes. The species is a free-running soil dweller that lives primarily in humus under bushes or large stones.

== Description ==
Only the male of this species has been described.

The male holotype has a total length of 3.50 mm. The cephalothorax is yellow in coloration, with the anterior portion of the pars thoracica showing faint traces of darkened reticulations. The margins bear long setae, and there is black pigment along the margins of the eyes. The chelicerae, mouthparts, and sternum are yellow, while the opisthosoma is white, suffused dorsally and laterally with purple pigment interrupted only by hairline chevrons. The venter is darkened only near the spinnerets. The legs are pale yellow, darkest distally.

The ocular area occupies 0.43 of the carapace width. The clypeus measures 0.10 mm in height. The chelicerae are 0.49 mm long, with a dorsal patch of erect setae at the apex, two promarginal teeth, and two widely spaced retromarginal teeth.

The leg formula is 4213. The tarsal organ has three short cuticular lobes on leg III and four on leg IV. The claws are relatively short, with the lateral flange occupying about half the claw length and bearing approximately eight teeth on the flange and five distal to the flange.

The male pedipalps are distinctive, with the palpal bulb being rotund and the embolus originating retrolaterally and bearing a spine at its base. The conductor is elaborate and serrate both dorsally and ventrally.

== Conservation status ==
Afrilobus capensis is listed as Least Concern by the South African National Biodiversity Institute. Despite its limited distribution, there are no known threats to the species, and it is protected within both Namaqua National Park and Cederberg Wilderness Area. The species is likely under-collected due to its cryptic lifestyle, and there is substantial natural habitat remaining between the known locations.
