= Turretia =

Conservation status
- Data Deficit (NZ TCS)

Scientific classification
- Kingdom: Animalia
- Phylum: Arthropoda
- Subphylum: Chelicerata
- Class: Arachnida
- Order: Araneae
- Infraorder: Araneomorphae
- Family: Orsolobidae
- Genus: Turretia; Forster & Platnick, 1985
- Species: T. dugdalei

Binomial name
- Turretia dugdalei Forster & Platnick, 1985

Genus of spiders

Turretia is a monotypic genus of Orsolobidae containing the single species, Turretia dugdalei.

== Taxonomy ==
This genus was described in 1985 by Ray Forster and Norman Platnick from a male specimen collected in Otago. The holotype is stored in the New Zealand Arthropod Collection under registration number NZAC03015010.

== Description ==
The female is recorded at 1.84mm in length. The abdomen is pale yellow.

== Distribution ==
This species is only known from Mount Gray in Otago, New Zealand.

== Conservation status ==
Under the New Zealand Threat Classification System, this species is listed as "Data Deficient" with the qualifiers of "Data Poor: Size", "Data Poor: Trend" and "One Location".
