= Losdolobus =

Scientific classification
- Kingdom: Animalia
- Phylum: Arthropoda
- Subphylum: Chelicerata
- Class: Arachnida
- Order: Araneae
- Infraorder: Araneomorphae
- Family: Orsolobidae
- Genus: Losdolobus; Platnick and Brescovit, 1994

Species
- See list.

Genus of spiders

Losdolobus is a genus of six-eyed spiders found in Brazil belonging to the family Orsolobidae.

== Species ==
The known species of Losdolobus include:

- Losdolobus nelsoni Pompozzi, 2015 — Argentina
- Losdolobus opytapora Brescovit, Bertoncello & Ott, 2004 — Brazil
- Losdolobus parana Platnick & Brescovit, 1994 — Argentina
- Losdolobus xaruanus Lise & Almeida, 2006 — Brazil
- Losdolobus ybypora Brescovit, Ott & Lise, 2004 — Brazil

== Curiosity ==
This genus name constitutes a curiosity: the arachnologists Platnick and Brescovit wanted to honor two Argentinians who helped them, Pablo Goloboff and Martín Ramírez. Asked to suggest a name, they proposed "losdolobus", which is drawn from the Buenos Aires argot called Lunfardo and loosely translates as "the morons".

== Bibliography ==
- Forster, R.R, Platnick, N.I. (1985): A review of the austral spider family Orsolobidae (Arachnida, Araneae), with notes on the superfamily Dysderoidea. Bulletin of the AMNH 181 PDF (147Mb!) Abstract
- Griswold, C.E., Platnick, N.I. (1987): On the first African spiders of the family Orsolobidae (Araneae, Dysderoidea). American Museum Novitates 2892. (PDF 5Mb) Abstract (Afrolobus, Azanialobus)
- Platnick, N.I., Brescovit, A.D. (1994): A new genus of the spider family Orsolobidae (Araneae, Dysderoidea) from Brazil. American Museum Novitates 3112 (PDF) (Abstract) (Losdolobus)
