= Tasmanoonops =

Scientific classification
- Kingdom: Animalia
- Phylum: Arthropoda
- Subphylum: Chelicerata
- Class: Arachnida
- Order: Araneae
- Infraorder: Araneomorphae
- Family: Orsolobidae
- Genus: Tasmanoonops; Hickman, 1930

Type species
- T. alipes Hickman, 1930

Species
- 30, see text

Genus of spiders

Tasmanoonops is a genus of Australian araneomorph spiders in the family Orsolobidae, and was first described by V. V. Hickman in 1930.

== Species ==
As of June 2019 it contains thirty species, found in New South Wales, Queensland, Victoria, Western Australia, and Tasmania:

- Tasmanoonops alipes Hickman, 1930 (type) – Australia (Tasmania)
- Tasmanoonops australis Forster & Platnick, 1985 – Australia (Western Australia)
- Tasmanoonops buang Forster & Platnick, 1985 – Australia (Victoria)
- Tasmanoonops buffalo Forster & Platnick, 1985 – Australia (Victoria)
- Tasmanoonops complexus Forster & Platnick, 1985 – Australia (Queensland)
- Tasmanoonops daviesae Forster & Platnick, 1985 – Australia (Queensland)
- Tasmanoonops dorrigo Forster & Platnick, 1985 – Australia (New South Wales)
- Tasmanoonops drimus Forster & Platnick, 1985 – Australia (Victoria)
- Tasmanoonops elongatus Forster & Platnick, 1985 – Australia (New South Wales)
- Tasmanoonops fulvus Hickman, 1979 – Australia (Tasmania)
- Tasmanoonops grayi Forster & Platnick, 1985 – Australia (New South Wales)
- Tasmanoonops hickmani Forster & Platnick, 1985 – Australia (Queensland)
- Tasmanoonops hunti Forster & Platnick, 1985 – Australia (New South Wales)
- Tasmanoonops inornatus Hickman, 1979 – Australia (Tasmania)
- Tasmanoonops insulanus Forster & Platnick, 1985 – Australia (Tasmania)
- Tasmanoonops magnus Hickman, 1979 – Australia (Tasmania)
- Tasmanoonops mainae Forster & Platnick, 1985 – Australia (Western Australia)
- Tasmanoonops minutus Forster & Platnick, 1985 – Australia (Victoria)
- Tasmanoonops mysticus Forster & Platnick, 1985 – Australia (New South Wales)
- Tasmanoonops oranus Forster & Platnick, 1985 – Australia (Victoria)
- Tasmanoonops otimus Forster & Platnick, 1985 – Australia (New South Wales)
- Tasmanoonops pallidus Forster & Platnick, 1985 – Australia (New South Wales)
- Tasmanoonops parinus Forster & Platnick, 1985 – Australia (New South Wales)
- Tasmanoonops parvus Forster & Platnick, 1985 – Australia (Queensland)
- Tasmanoonops pinus Forster & Platnick, 1985 – Australia (New South Wales)
- Tasmanoonops ripus Forster & Platnick, 1985 – Australia (New South Wales)
- Tasmanoonops rogerkitchingi Baehr, Raven & Hebron, 2011 – Australia (Queensland)
- Tasmanoonops septentrionalis Forster & Platnick, 1985 – Australia (Queensland)
- Tasmanoonops trispinus Forster & Platnick, 1985 – Australia (Tasmania)
- Tasmanoonops unicus Forster & Platnick, 1985 – Australia (Queensland)
