= Muka (surname) =

Muka (pronounced [muka]) is an Albanian surname. Notable people with this name include:

- Arnošt Muka (1854–1932), German and Sorbian writer and linguist
- Devi Muka (born 1976), retired Albanian footballer
- Koço Muka (1895–1954), Albanian politician, lawyer and Minister of Education
- Ogert Muka (born 1979), retired Albanian footballer
