= Mallecolobus =

Scientific classification
- Kingdom: Animalia
- Phylum: Arthropoda
- Subphylum: Chelicerata
- Class: Arachnida
- Order: Araneae
- Infraorder: Araneomorphae
- Family: Orsolobidae
- Genus: Mallecolobus; Forster & Platnick, 1985

Type species
- M. malacus Forster & Platnick, 1985

Species
- 4, see text

Genus of spiders

Mallecolobus is a genus of Chilean araneomorph spiders in the family Orsolobidae, and was first described by Raymond Robert Forster & Norman I. Platnick in 1985.

== Species ==
As of June 2019 it contains four species, found only in Chile:

- Mallecolobus malacus Forster & Platnick, 1985 (type) – Chile
- Mallecolobus maullin Forster & Platnick, 1985 – Chile
- Mallecolobus pedrus Forster & Platnick, 1985 – Chile
- Mallecolobus sanus Forster & Platnick, 1985 – Chile
