= Hickmanolobus =

Scientific classification
- Kingdom: Animalia
- Phylum: Arthropoda
- Subphylum: Chelicerata
- Class: Arachnida
- Order: Araneae
- Infraorder: Araneomorphae
- Family: Orsolobidae
- Genus: Hickmanolobus; Forster & Platnick, 1985

Type species
- H. mollipes (Hickman, 1932)

Species
- 5, see text

Genus of spiders

Hickmanolobus is a genus of Australian araneomorph spiders in the family Orsolobidae, and was first described by Raymond Robert Forster & Norman I. Platnick in 1985.

== Species ==
As of June 2019 it contains five species, found only in Tasmania, New South Wales, and Queensland:

- Hickmanolobus ibisca Baehr & Smith, 2008 – Australia (Queensland, New South Wales)
- Hickmanolobus jojo Baehr & Smith, 2008 – Australia (New South Wales)
- Hickmanolobus linnaei Baehr & Smith, 2008 – Australia (New South Wales)
- Hickmanolobus mollipes (Hickman, 1932) (type) – Australia (Tasmania)
- Hickmanolobus nimorakiotakisi Baehr, Raven & Hebron, 2011 – Australia (Queensland)
