= Tautukua =

Conservation status
- Data Deficit (NZ TCS)

Scientific classification
- Kingdom: Animalia
- Phylum: Arthropoda
- Subphylum: Chelicerata
- Class: Arachnida
- Order: Araneae
- Infraorder: Araneomorphae
- Family: Orsolobidae
- Genus: Tautukua; Forster & Platnick, 1985
- Species: T. isolata

Binomial name
- Tautukua isolata Forster & Platnick, 1985

Genus of spiders

Tautukua is a monotypic genus of Orsolobidae containing the single species, Tautukua isolata.

== Taxonomy ==
This genus was described in 1985 by Ray Forster and Norman Platnick from female specimens collected in the Catlins. The holotype is stored in Otago Museum.

== Description ==
The female is recorded at 2.80mm in length. The carapace is shaded around the eyes and the abdomen is shaded dorsally with pale markings.

== Distribution ==
This genus is only known from Tautuku in Otago, New Zealand.

== Conservation status ==
Under the New Zealand Threat Classification System, this species is listed as "Data Deficient" with the qualifiers of "Data Poor: Size", "Data Poor: Trend" and "One Location".
