= Anopsolobus =

Conservation status
- Data Deficit (NZ TCS)

Scientific classification
- Kingdom: Animalia
- Phylum: Arthropoda
- Subphylum: Chelicerata
- Class: Arachnida
- Order: Araneae
- Infraorder: Araneomorphae
- Family: Orsolobidae
- Genus: Anopsolobus; Forster & Platnick, 1985
- Species: A. subterraneus

Binomial name
- Anopsolobus subterraneus Forster & Platnick, 1985

Genus of spiders

Anopsolobus is a monotypic genus of Polynesian araneomorph spiders in the family Orsolobidae containing the single species, Anopsolobus subterraneus. It was first described by Raymond Robert Forster & Norman I. Platnick in 1985, and is only known from Nelson in New Zealand.

== Etymology ==
"Anopsolobus" refers to the absence of eyes and "subterraneus" refers to the habitat this species was found in.

== Taxonomy ==
Anopsolobus subterraneus was described in 1985 by Raymond Forster and Normal Platnick from one female specimen. The specimen was found 4 meters underground in a bore using a trap intended to collect interstitial aquatic animals, but instead caught terrestrial animals when the water table receded. The holotype is stored in the New Zealand Arthropod Collection under registration number NZAC03014989.

Anopsolobus is suggested to be closely related to the genus Tangata.

== Description ==
The only specimen is 1.96mm in length, is unpigmented and notably has no eyes. The body is densely covered in hairs.

== Distribution ==
This species is only known from Nelson, New Zealand. It was discovered in a bore hole 4m underground.

== Conservation status ==
Under the New Zealand Threat Classification System, this species is listed as "Data Deficient" with the qualifiers of "Data Poor: Size", "Data Poor: Trend" and "One Location".
