= Orsolobus =

Scientific classification
- Kingdom: Animalia
- Phylum: Arthropoda
- Subphylum: Chelicerata
- Class: Arachnida
- Order: Araneae
- Infraorder: Araneomorphae
- Family: Orsolobidae
- Genus: Orsolobus; Simon, 1893

Type species
- O. singularis (Nicolet, 1849)

Species
- 9, see text

Genus of spiders

Orsolobus is a genus of South American araneomorph spiders in the family Orsolobidae, and was first described by Eugène Louis Simon in 1893.

== Species ==
As of June 2019 it contains nine species, found only in Argentina and Chile:

- Orsolobus chelifer Tullgren, 1902 – Chile
- Orsolobus chilensis Forster & Platnick, 1985 – Chile
- Orsolobus mapocho Forster & Platnick, 1985 – Chile
- Orsolobus montt Forster & Platnick, 1985 – Chile
- Orsolobus plenus Forster & Platnick, 1985 – Chile
- Orsolobus pucara Forster & Platnick, 1985 – Chile, Argentina
- Orsolobus pucatrihue Forster & Platnick, 1985 – Chile
- Orsolobus schlingeri Forster & Platnick, 1985 – Chile
- Orsolobus singularis (Nicolet, 1849) (type) – Chile
