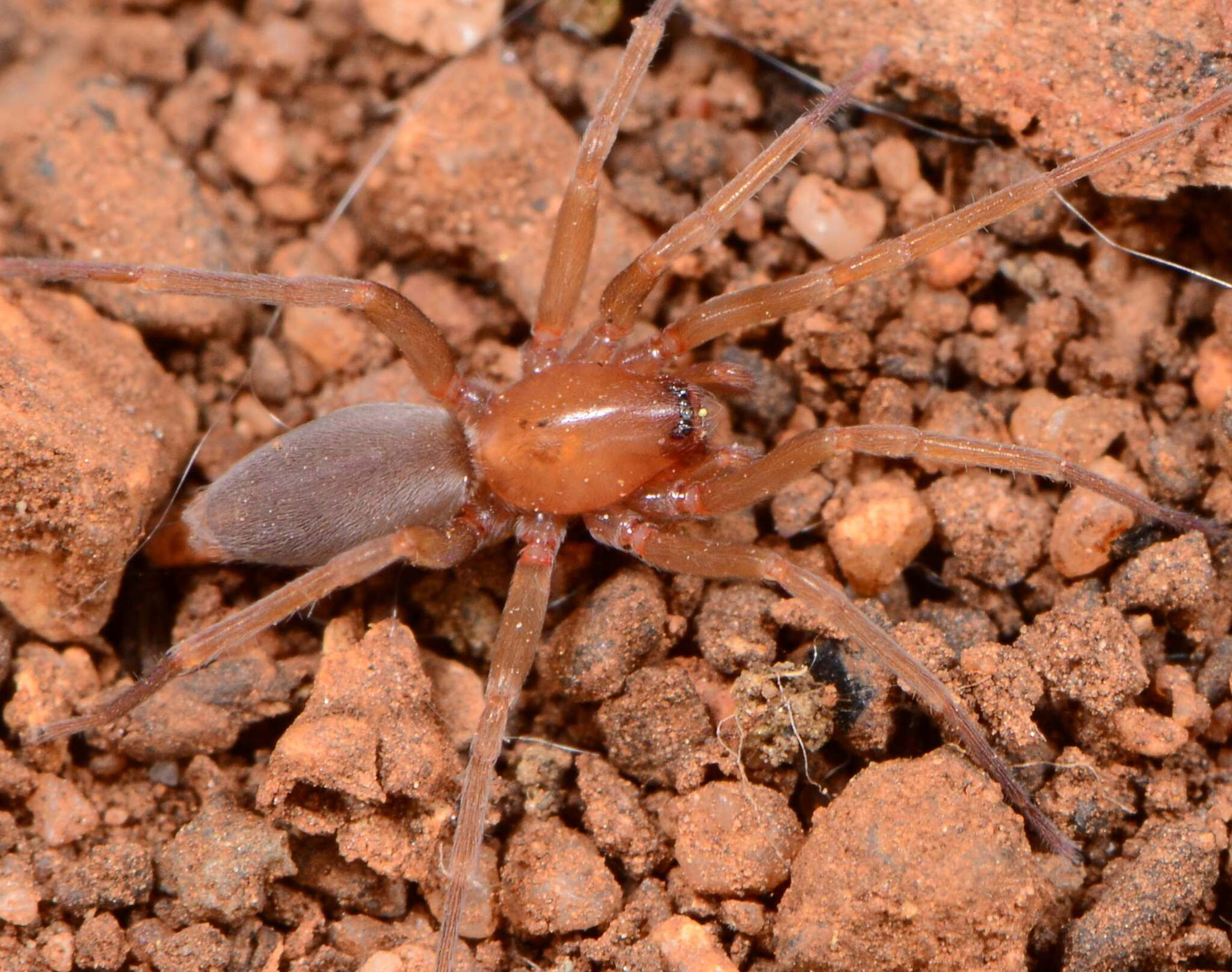
- Male Azanialobus lawrencei
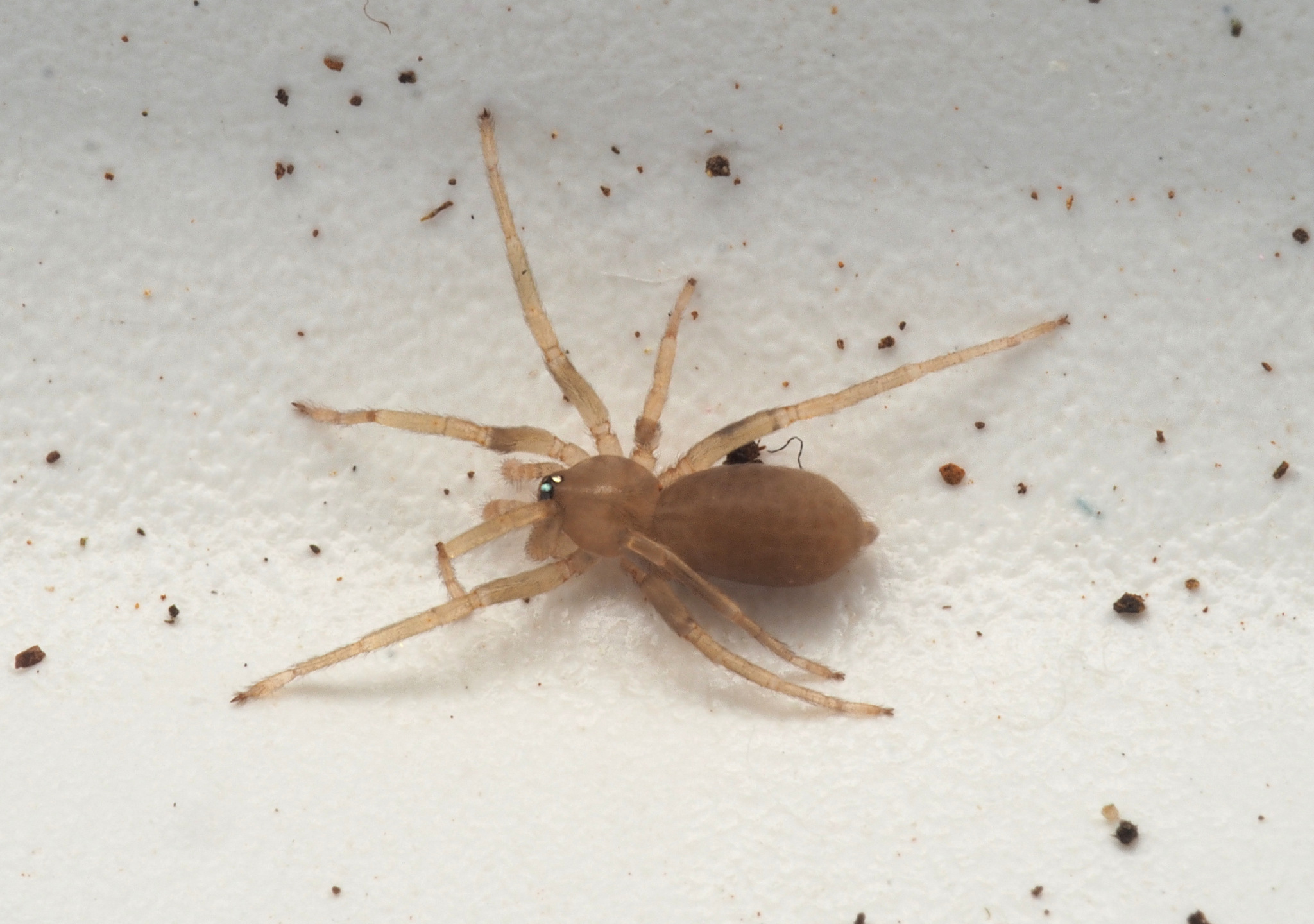
- Tasmanoonops sp.

Scientific classification
- Kingdom: Animalia
- Phylum: Arthropoda
- Subphylum: Chelicerata
- Class: Arachnida
- Order: Araneae
- Infraorder: Araneomorphae
- Family: Orsolobidae; Cooke, 1965

Diversity
- 30 genera, 190 species
- blue: reported countries (WSC)

= Orsolobidae =

Family of spiders

Orsolobidae is a six-eyed spider family with about 200 described species in thirty genera. It was first described by J. A. L. Cooke in 1965, and was raised to family status from "Dysderidae" in 1985.

== Distribution ==
Most genera are endemic to New Zealand and the Australian region, but several genera occur in southern Africa and South America.

== Genera ==
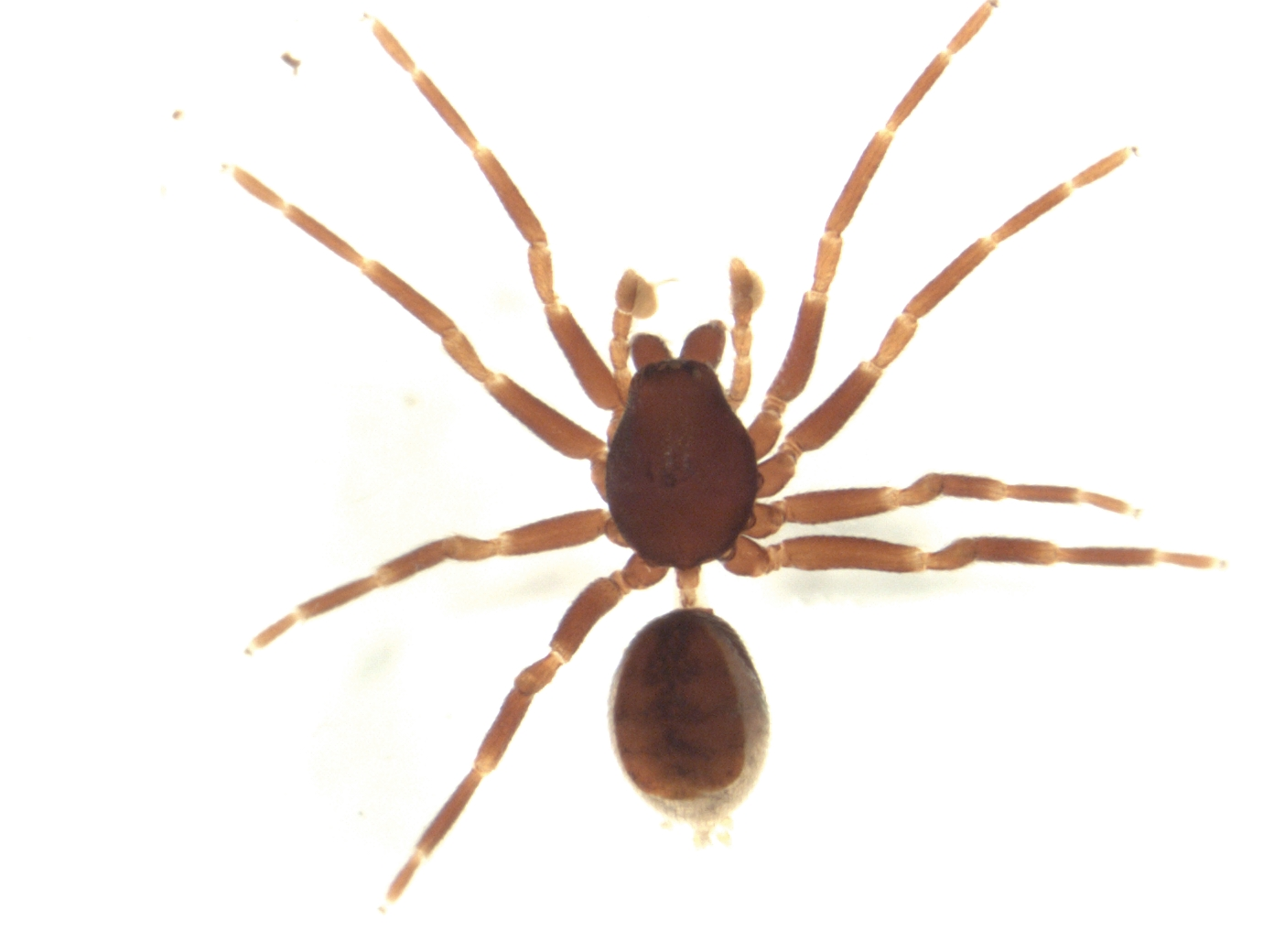
Duripelta sp.

As of January 2026, this family includes thirty genera and 190 species:

- Afrilobus Griswold & Platnick, 1987 – Malawi, South Africa
- Anopsolobus Forster & Platnick, 1985 – New Zealand
- Ascuta Forster, 1956 – New Zealand
- Australobus Forster & Platnick, 1985 – Australia
- Azanialobus Griswold & Platnick, 1987 – Lesotho, South Africa
- Basibulbus Ott, Platnick, Berniker & Bonaldo, 2013 – Chile
- Bealeyia Forster & Platnick, 1985 – New Zealand
- Calculus Purcell, 1910 – South Africa
- Chileolobus Forster & Platnick, 1985 – Chile
- Cornifalx Hickman, 1979 – Australia
- Dugdalea Forster & Platnick, 1985 – New Zealand
- Duripelta Forster, 1956 – New Zealand
- Falklandia Forster & Platnick, 1985 – Falkland Islands
- Hickmanolobus Forster & Platnick, 1985 – Australia
- Losdolobus Platnick & Brescovit, 1994 – Argentina, Brazil, Uruguay
- Mallecolobus Forster & Platnick, 1985 – Chile
- Maoriata Forster & Platnick, 1985 – New Zealand
- Orongia Forster & Platnick, 1985 – New Zealand
- Orsolobus Simon, 1893 – Argentina, Chile
- Osornolobus Forster & Platnick, 1985 – Chile, Falkland Islands
- Paralobus Forster & Platnick, 1985 – New Zealand
- Pounamuella Forster & Platnick, 1985 – New Zealand
- Subantarctia Forster, 1955 – New Zealand
- Tangata Forster & Platnick, 1985 – New Zealand
- Tasmanoonops Hickman, 1930 – Australia
- Tautukua Forster & Platnick, 1985 – New Zealand
- Turretia Forster & Platnick, 1985 – New Zealand
- Waiporia Forster & Platnick, 1985 – New Zealand
- Waipoua Forster & Platnick, 1985 – New Zealand
- Wiltonia Forster & Platnick, 1985 – New Zealand
