= Modica (disambiguation) =

Modica is a city on the island of Sicily in Italy.

Modica may also refer to:

== Animal and plant species ==
- Acronicta modica, a species of moth found in north America
- Anacithara modica, a species of sea snail found in east Asia
- Aneflomorpha modica, a species of beetle
- Apatophysis modica, a species of beetle found in Iran and south Asia
- Besleria modica, a species of flowering plant found in Ecuador
- Caloptilia modica, a species of moth found on Madagascar
- Dactylispa modica, a species of beetle found in the African Great Lakes region
- Gibberula modica, a species of sea snail found in São Tomé and Príncipe
- Modica fugitiva, a species of butterfly found in Suriname
- Neocollyris modica, a species of beetle
- Notata modica, a species of moth found in Australia
- Obereopsis modica, a species of beetle
- Oligia modica, a species of moth found in north America
- Oruge tree frog (Litoria modica), a species of frog found on New Guinea
- Parapsectris modica, a species of moth found in Namibia
- Pardosa modica, a species of spider found in north America
- Rhodopina modica, a species of beetle
- Scaptesylodes modica, a species of moth found in southeast Asia
- Waiporia modica, a species of spider found in New Zealand

== People ==
- Agustín Módica (born 2003), Italian-Argentinian association footballer
- Andrea Modica (born 1960), American photographer
- Arturo Di Modica (1941-2021), Italian sculptor
- Gary Modica, American bass guitarist and member of Wrath (band)
- Giacomo Modica (born 1964), Italian association football manager and former player
- Giuliano Modica (born 1991), Argentinian former association footballer
- Luciano Modica (1950-2021), Italian politician
- Michele Modica (born 1955), Italian businessman and organised criminal
- Samuele Modica (born 1991), Italian association footballer
- Vincenzo Modica (born 1971), Italian distance runner

== Places ==
- County of Modica, a feudal territory in the Kingdom of Sicily
- Modica Way, a legal graffiti gallery in Cambridge, Massachusetts
- Nova Módica, a municipality in Brazil

== Other ==
- ASD Modica Calcio, an Italian association football club
- Cioccolato di Modica, a specialty chocolate
