= Waiporia hawea =

Conservation status
- Relict (NZ TCS)

Scientific classification
- Kingdom: Animalia
- Phylum: Arthropoda
- Subphylum: Chelicerata
- Class: Arachnida
- Order: Araneae
- Infraorder: Araneomorphae
- Family: Orsolobidae
- Genus: Waiporia
- Species: W. hawea

Binomial name
- Waiporia hawea Forster & Platnick, 1985

Species of spider

Waiporia hawea is a species of Orsolobidae that is endemic to New Zealand, with a known range in Central Otago.

== Taxonomy ==
This species was described in 1985 by Ray Forster and Norman Platnick from male and female specimens collected in Central Otago. The holotype is stored in Otago Museum.

== Description ==
The male is recorded at 2.08 mm in length whereas the female is 2.24 mm. This species is patterned dorsally.

== Distribution ==
This species is only known from near Lake Hāwea in Central Otago.

== Conservation status ==
Under the New Zealand Threat Classification System, this species is listed as "Relict" with the qualifier "One Location".
