= Rhodopina javana =

Scientific classification
- Kingdom: Animalia
- Phylum: Arthropoda
- Class: Insecta
- Order: Coleoptera
- Suborder: Polyphaga
- Infraorder: Cucujiformia
- Family: Cerambycidae
- Genus: Rhodopina
- Species: R. javana

Binomial name
- Rhodopina javana (Aurivillius, 1907)

Species of beetle

Rhodopina javana is a species of beetle in the family Cerambycidae. It was described by Per Olof Christopher Aurivillius in 1907.

Species of the genus ''Rhodopina'' are typically recorded from Southeast Asia, including Indonesia.
