= Rhodopina meshimensis =

Scientific classification
- Domain: Eukaryota
- Kingdom: Animalia
- Phylum: Arthropoda
- Class: Insecta
- Order: Coleoptera
- Suborder: Polyphaga
- Infraorder: Cucujiformia
- Family: Cerambycidae
- Genus: Rhodopina
- Species: R. meshimensis

Binomial name
- Rhodopina meshimensis Makihara, 1980

Species of beetle

Rhodopina meshimensis is a species of beetle in the family Cerambycidae. It was described by Hiroshi Makihara in 1980. It is known from Japan.
