= Apatophysis caspica =

Scientific classification
- Domain: Eukaryota
- Kingdom: Animalia
- Phylum: Arthropoda
- Class: Insecta
- Order: Coleoptera
- Suborder: Polyphaga
- Infraorder: Cucujiformia
- Family: Cerambycidae
- Genus: Apatophysis
- Species: A. caspica

Binomial name
- Apatophysis caspica Semenov, 1901

Species of beetle

Apatophysis caspica is a species of beetle in the family Cerambycidae, in the subgenus Apatophysis.
