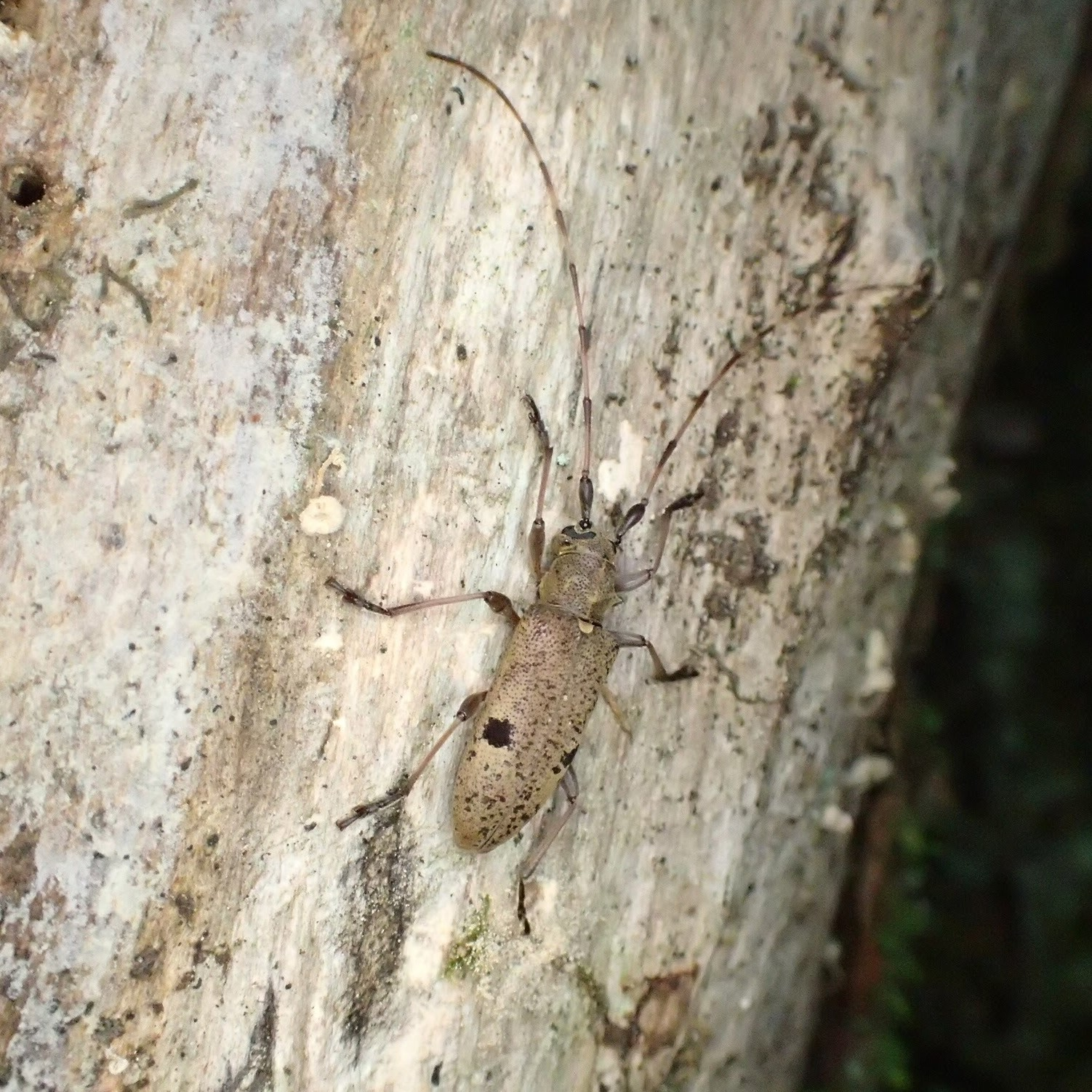

Scientific classification
- Domain: Eukaryota
- Kingdom: Animalia
- Phylum: Arthropoda
- Class: Insecta
- Order: Coleoptera
- Suborder: Polyphaga
- Infraorder: Cucujiformia
- Family: Cerambycidae
- Genus: Rhodopina
- Species: R. integripennis

Binomial name
- Rhodopina integripennis (Bates, 1884)

= Rhodopina integripennis =

Species of beetle

Rhodopina integripennis is a species of beetle in the family Cerambycidae. It was described by Henry Walter Bates in 1884.
