= Aneflomorpha parowana =

Scientific classification
- Kingdom: Animalia
- Phylum: Arthropoda
- Class: Insecta
- Order: Coleoptera
- Suborder: Polyphaga
- Infraorder: Cucujiformia
- Family: Cerambycidae
- Genus: Aneflomorpha
- Species: A. parowana

Binomial name
- Aneflomorpha parowana Casey, 1924

Species of beetle

Aneflomorpha parowana is a species of beetle in the family Cerambycidae. It was described by Casey in 1924.
