= Apatophysis modica =

Scientific classification
- Domain: Eukaryota
- Kingdom: Animalia
- Phylum: Arthropoda
- Class: Insecta
- Order: Coleoptera
- Suborder: Polyphaga
- Infraorder: Cucujiformia
- Family: Cerambycidae
- Genus: Apatophysis
- Species: A. modica

Binomial name
- Apatophysis modica Gahan, 1906

Synonyms
- Apatophysis richteri Pic, 1956

Species of beetle

Apatophysis modica is a species of beetle in the family Cerambycidae, in the genus Apatophysis and subgenus Angustephysis. It is found it Afghanistan, Iran, and Pakistan.
