= Aneflomorpha minuta =

Scientific classification
- Domain: Eukaryota
- Kingdom: Animalia
- Phylum: Arthropoda
- Class: Insecta
- Order: Coleoptera
- Suborder: Polyphaga
- Infraorder: Cucujiformia
- Family: Cerambycidae
- Genus: Aneflomorpha
- Species: A. minuta

Binomial name
- Aneflomorpha minuta Chemsak, 1962

Species of beetle

Aneflomorpha minuta is a species of beetle in the family Cerambycidae. It was described by Chemsak in 1962.
