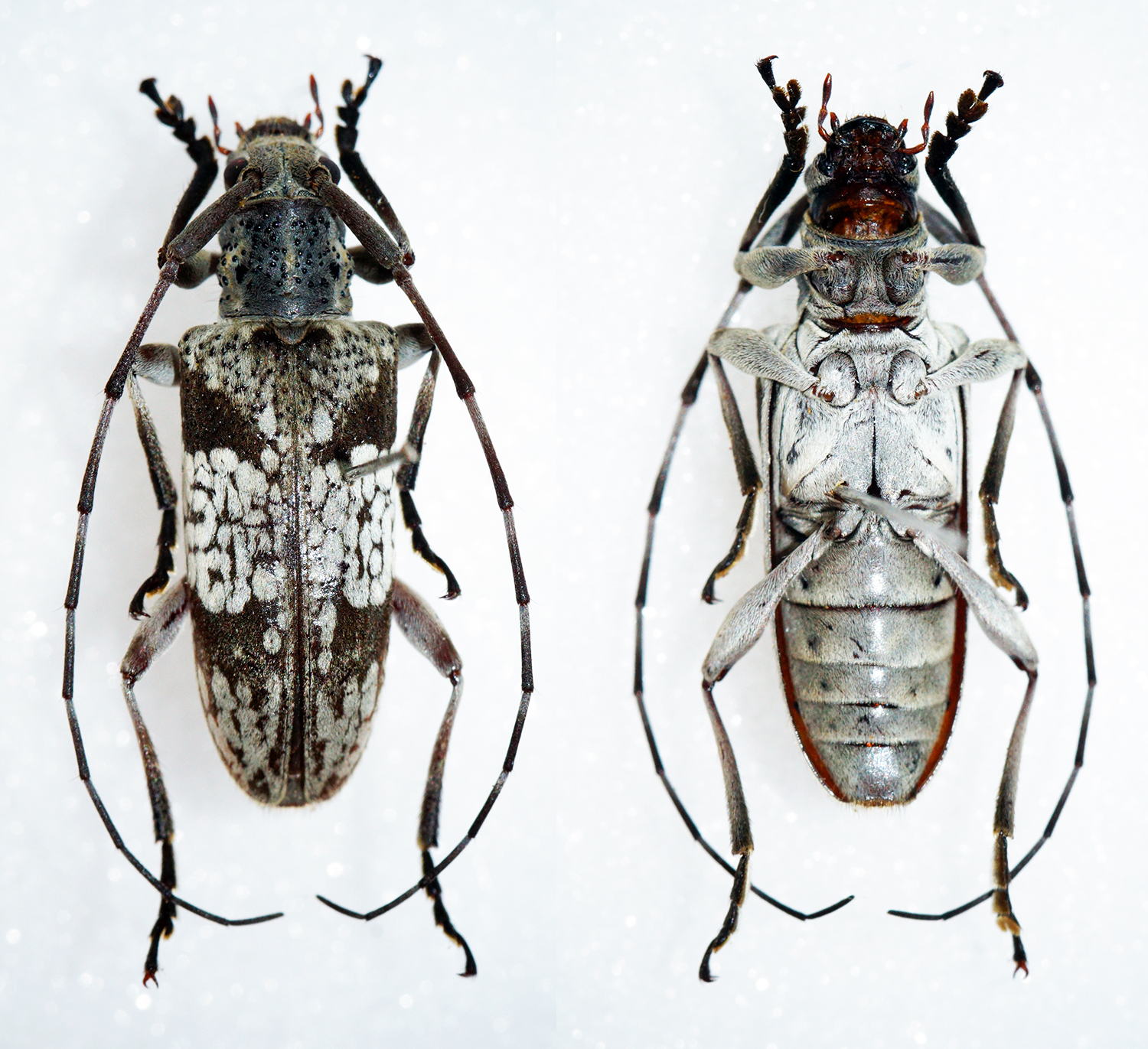

Scientific classification
- Kingdom: Animalia
- Phylum: Arthropoda
- Class: Insecta
- Order: Coleoptera
- Suborder: Polyphaga
- Infraorder: Cucujiformia
- Family: Cerambycidae
- Genus: Rhodopina
- Species: R. formosana

Binomial name
- Rhodopina formosana (Breuning, 1954)

= Rhodopina formosana =

Species of beetle

Rhodopina formosana is a species of beetle in the family Cerambycidae. It was described by Stephan von Breuning in 1954.
