= Apatophysis baeckmanniana =

Scientific classification
- Kingdom: Animalia
- Phylum: Arthropoda
- Clade: Pancrustacea
- Class: Insecta
- Order: Coleoptera
- Suborder: Polyphaga
- Infraorder: Cucujiformia
- Family: Cerambycidae
- Genus: Apatophysis
- Species: A. baeckmanniana

Binomial name
- Apatophysis baeckmanniana Semenov, 1907

Species of beetle

Apatophysis baeckmanniana is a species of beetle in the family Cerambycidae, in the genus Apatophysis.
