= Rhodopina tubericollis =

Scientific classification
- Kingdom: Animalia
- Phylum: Arthropoda
- Class: Insecta
- Order: Coleoptera
- Suborder: Polyphaga
- Infraorder: Cucujiformia
- Family: Cerambycidae
- Genus: Rhodopina
- Species: R. tubericollis

Binomial name
- Rhodopina tubericollis (Breuning, 1943)

Synonyms
- Rhodopis tubericollis Breuning, 1943

Species of beetle

Rhodopina tubericollis is a species of beetle in the family Cerambycidae. It was described by Stephan von Breuning in 1943. It is known from Borneo.
