= Apatophysis farsicola =

Scientific classification
- Kingdom: Animalia
- Phylum: Arthropoda
- Clade: Pancrustacea
- Class: Insecta
- Order: Coleoptera
- Suborder: Polyphaga
- Infraorder: Cucujiformia
- Family: Cerambycidae
- Genus: Apatophysis
- Species: A. farsicola

Binomial name
- Apatophysis farsicola Sama, Fallahzadeh & Rapuzzi, 2005

Species of beetle

Apatophysis farsicola is a species of beetle in the family Cerambycidae, in the subgenus Apatophysis.
