= Rhodopina albomaculata =

Scientific classification
- Domain: Eukaryota
- Kingdom: Animalia
- Phylum: Arthropoda
- Class: Insecta
- Order: Coleoptera
- Suborder: Polyphaga
- Infraorder: Cucujiformia
- Family: Cerambycidae
- Genus: Rhodopina
- Species: R. albomaculata

Binomial name
- Rhodopina albomaculata Gahan, 1890

Species of beetle

Rhodopina albomaculata is a species of beetle in the family Cerambycidae. It was described by Charles Joseph Gahan in 1890.
