= Rhodopina quadrituberculata =

Scientific classification
- Domain: Eukaryota
- Kingdom: Animalia
- Phylum: Arthropoda
- Class: Insecta
- Order: Coleoptera
- Suborder: Polyphaga
- Infraorder: Cucujiformia
- Family: Cerambycidae
- Genus: Rhodopina
- Species: R. quadrituberculata

Binomial name
- Rhodopina quadrituberculata (Aurivillius, 1920)

Species of beetle

Rhodopina quadrituberculata is a species of beetle in the family Cerambycidae. It was described by Per Olof Christopher Aurivillius in 1920. It is known from India.
