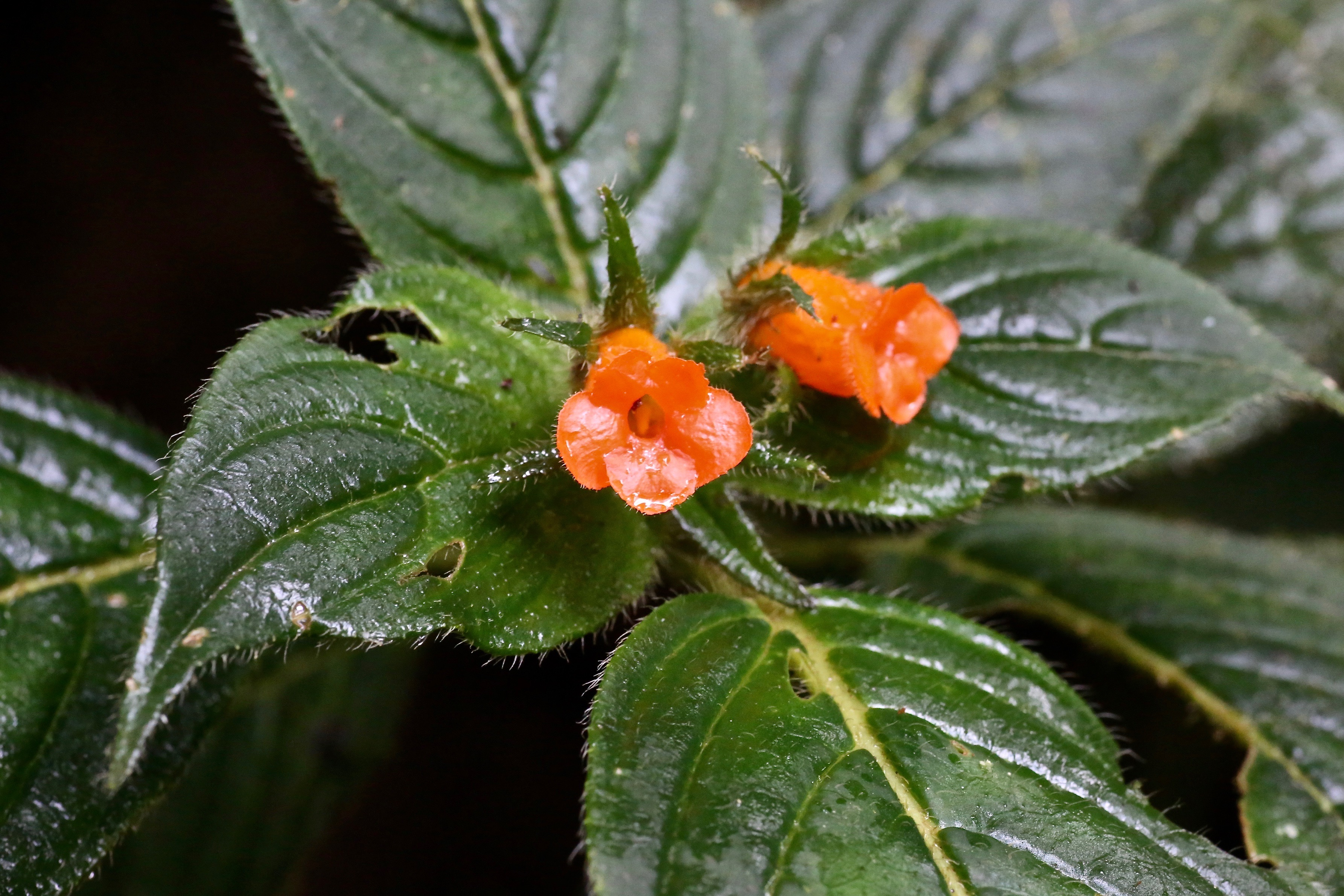
- Besleria comosa

Scientific classification
- Kingdom: Plantae
- Clade: Tracheophytes
- Clade: Angiosperms
- Clade: Eudicots
- Clade: Asterids
- Order: Lamiales
- Family: Gesneriaceae
- Genus: Besleria; Plum. ex L.

Type species
- Besleria lutea L.

Species
- 176; see text

Synonyms
- Eriphia P.Browne (1756); Cyrtanthemum Oerst. (1861); Gasteranthopsis Oerst.(1861); Parabesleria Oerst. (1858); Pseudobesleria Oerst. (1858); Pterobesleria C.V.Morton (1953)

= Besleria =

Genus of flowering plants

Besleria is a genus of large herbs and soft-stemmed subshrubs or shrubs in the flowering plant family Gesneriaceae. It includes 176 species native to tropical southern Mexico, Central America, South America, and the West Indies.

The closely related genus Gasteranthus was previously included in Besleria. The two genera have been separated on the basis of stomatal (aggregated in Gasteranthus, scattered in Besleria) and fruit (fleshy capsule in Gasteranthus, berry in Besleria) characters.

== Species ==
176 species are accepted.

- Besleria affinis C.V.Morton
- Besleria aggregata (Mart.) Hanst.
- Besleria amabilis C.V.Morton
- Besleria angusta C.V.Morton
- Besleria angustiflora Fritsch
- Besleria arborescens C.V.Morton
- Besleria arbusta L.E.Skog
- Besleria ardens Decne. ex Linden
- Besleria aristeguitae (C.V.Morton) Wiehler
- Besleria attenuata C.V.Morton
- Besleria aurea I.G.Costa & G.E.Ferreira
- Besleria azulensis R.Rojas
- Besleria barbata (Poepp.) Hanst.
- Besleria barbensis Hanst.
- Besleria barclayi J.E.Skog
- Besleria beltranii I.Salinas
- Besleria boliviana C.V.Morton
- Besleria brevicalyx G.E.Ferreira & Chautems
- Besleria brevisepala O.L.Cortés
- Besleria calantha C.V.Morton
- Besleria calycina L.E.Skog
- Besleria campanulata Linden
- Besleria capitata Poepp.
- Besleria chiriquensis Wiehler
- Besleria cinnabarina Fritsch
- Besleria citrina Fritsch
- Besleria clivorum C.V.Morton
- Besleria cognata C.V.Morton
- Besleria columneoides Hanst.
- Besleria comosa C.V.Morton
- Besleria compta C.V.Morton
- Besleria concinna C.V.Morton
- Besleria concolor Fritsch
- Besleria conformis C.V.Morton
- Besleria connata C.V.Morton
- Besleria conspecta C.V.Morton
- Besleria crassa C.V.Morton
- Besleria crassicaulis C.V.Morton
- Besleria cuneata Gardner
- Besleria cyrtanthemum Hanst.
- Besleria decipiens C.V.Morton
- Besleria deflexa (Oerst.) Hanst.
- Besleria delvillarii Cuatrec.
- Besleria diabolica G.E.Ferreira & Chautems
- Besleria discreta G.E.Ferreira
- Besleria disgrega C.V.Morton
- Besleria divaricata Poepp.
- Besleria duarteana Hoehne
- Besleria elegans Kunth
- Besleria elongata Urb.
- Besleria emendata C.V.Morton
- Besleria eriocalyx C.V.Morton
- Besleria fallax C.E.González, L.E.Skog & M.Amaya
- Besleria fasciculata Wawra
- Besleria fecunda C.V.Morton
- Besleria ferreyrae C.V.Morton
- Besleria filipes Urb.
- Besleria flava C.V.Morton
- Besleria flavovirens Nees & Mart.
- Besleria floribunda Fritsch
- Besleria florida C.V.Morton
- Besleria fluminensis Brade
- Besleria formicaria Nowicke
- Besleria furva C.V.Morton
- Besleria gibbosa (Poepp.) Hanst.
- Besleria glabra (Oerst.) Hanst.
- Besleria gracilenta C.V.Morton
- Besleria grandifolia Schott
- Besleria heterosepala Fritsch
- Besleria hirsuta (Oerst.) Hanst.
- Besleria hutchisonii C.V.Morton
- Besleria iara G.E.Ferreira & M.J.G.Hopkins
- Besleria illustris C.V.Morton
- Besleria imberbis C.V.Morton
- Besleria immitis C.V.Morton
- Besleria impressa C.V.Morton
- Besleria inaequalis C.V.Morton
- Besleria insolita C.V.Morton
- Besleria kalbreyeri Fritsch
- Besleria labiosa Hanst.
- Besleria laeta C.V.Morton
- Besleria lanceolata Urb.
- Besleria lasiantha C.V.Morton
- Besleria laxiflora Benth.
- Besleria lehmannii Fritsch
- Besleria leucocarpa C.V.Morton
- Besleria leucostoma (Hook.) Hanst.
- Besleria longimucronata Hoehne
- Besleria longipedunculata Britton ex Rusby
- Besleria longipes Urb.
- Besleria lucida Poepp.
- Besleria lutea L.
- Besleria maasii Wiehler
- Besleria macahensis Brade
- Besleria macrocalyx C.V.Morton
- Besleria macropoda Donn.Sm.
- Besleria maxima C.V.Morton
- Besleria melancholica (Vell.) C.V.Morton
- Besleria membranacea C.V.Morton
- Besleria meridionalis C.V.Morton
- Besleria microphylla Fritsch
- Besleria miniata C.V.Morton
- Besleria minutiflora Fritsch
- Besleria mirifica C.V.Morton
- Besleria modica C.V.Morton
- Besleria moorei C.V.Morton
- Besleria mortoniana Steyerm.
- Besleria mucronata Hanst.
- Besleria naquenensis Arellano-Peña & Aymard
- Besleria neblinae Feuillet
- Besleria nemorosa C.V.Morton
- Besleria nitens Fritsch
- Besleria notabilis C.V.Morton
- Besleria nubigena C.V.Morton
- Besleria obtusa C.V.Morton
- Besleria ornata C.V.Morton
- Besleria ovalifolia Britton
- Besleria ovoidea C.V.Morton
- Besleria oxyphylla C.V.Morton
- Besleria pallidiflora Fritsch
- Besleria parviflora L.E.Skog & Steyerm.
- Besleria patrisii DC.
- Besleria pauciflora Rusby
- Besleria pendula Hanst.
- Besleria penduliflora Fritsch
- Besleria pennellii C.V.Morton
- Besleria peruviana Fritsch
- Besleria petiolaris (Griseb.) Urb.
- Besleria physaloides O.L.Cortés
- Besleria placita C.V.Morton
- Besleria princeps Hanst.
- Besleria quadrangulata L.E.Skog
- Besleria racemosa C.V.Morton
- Besleria rara L.E.Skog
- Besleria reticulata Fritsch
- Besleria rhytidophyllum Hanst.
- Besleria riparia C.V.Morton
- Besleria robusta Donn.Sm.
- Besleria rosea (C.V.Morton) Wiehler
- Besleria rotundifolia Rusby
- Besleria salicifolia Ersch
- Besleria santaclarensis Clavijo & Sánchez-Taborda
- Besleria saxicola C.V.Morton
- Besleria seitzii Krug & Urb.
- Besleria selloana Klotzsch & Hanst.
- Besleria sieberiana Urb.
- Besleria silverstoneana O.L.Cortés
- Besleria solanoides Kunth
- Besleria spinulosa C.V.Morton
- Besleria spissa C.V.Morton
- Besleria sprucei Britton ex Rusby
- Besleria standleyi C.V.Morton
- Besleria steyermarkiorum Wiehler ex L.E.Skog
- Besleria stricta L.E.Skog
- Besleria strigillosa Urb.
- Besleria subcarnosa Fritsch
- Besleria subdecurrens C.V.Morton
- Besleria subulata Nowicke
- Besleria symphytum Klotzsch & Hanst.
- Besleria tambensis C.V.Morton
- Besleria tetrangularis Ruiz ex Hanst.
- Besleria trichiata C.V.Morton
- Besleria trichostegia Donn.Sm.
- Besleria triflora (Oerst.) Hanst.
- Besleria tuberculata C.V.Morton
- Besleria umbrosa Mart.
- Besleria vanderwerffii R.Rojas
- Besleria vargasii C.V.Morton
- Besleria variabilis C.V.Morton
- Besleria ventricosa C.V.Morton
- Besleria verecunda C.V.Morton
- Besleria vernoniana Kottaim.
- Besleria vestita Fritsch
- Besleria villosa Fritsch
- Besleria yaracuyensis Hoehne
- Besleria yatuana Feuillet
