= Apatophysis anatolica =

Scientific classification
- Kingdom: Animalia
- Phylum: Arthropoda
- Clade: Pancrustacea
- Class: Insecta
- Order: Coleoptera
- Suborder: Polyphaga
- Infraorder: Cucujiformia
- Family: Cerambycidae
- Genus: Apatophysis
- Species: A. anatolica

Binomial name
- Apatophysis anatolica Heyrovský, 1938

Species of beetle

Apatophysis anatolica is a species of beetle in the family Cerambycidae, in the genus Apatophysis.
