= Rhodopina seriata =

Scientific classification
- Kingdom: Animalia
- Phylum: Arthropoda
- Clade: Pancrustacea
- Class: Insecta
- Order: Coleoptera
- Suborder: Polyphaga
- Infraorder: Cucujiformia
- Family: Cerambycidae
- Genus: Rhodopina
- Species: R. seriata

Binomial name
- Rhodopina seriata (Aurivillius, 1913)

Synonyms
- Rhodopis seriata Aurivillius, 1913

Species of beetle

Rhodopina seriata is a species of beetle in the family Cerambycidae. It was described by Per Olof Christopher Aurivillius in 1913. It is known from Borneo, Java, and Sumatra.
