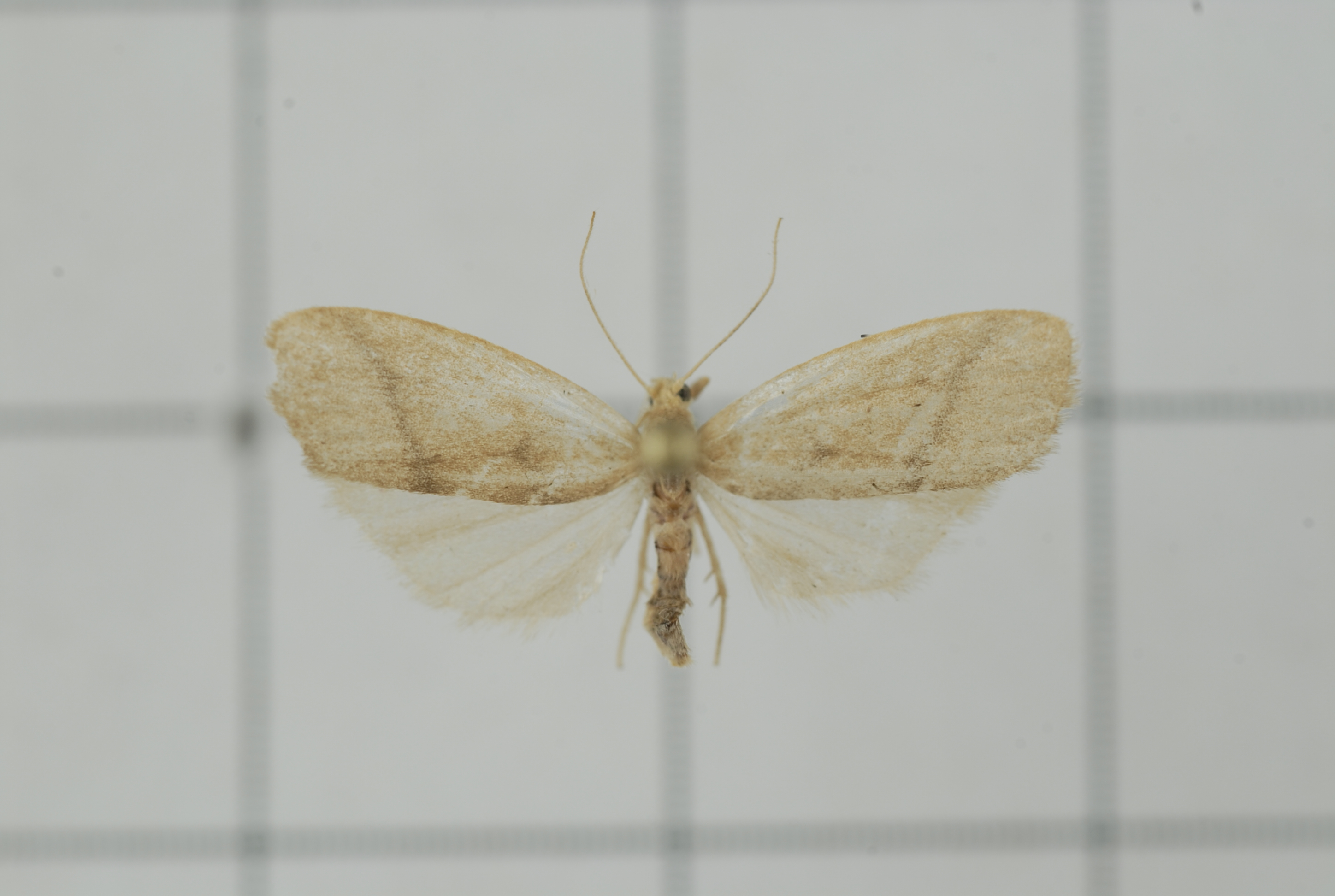

Scientific classification
- Kingdom: Animalia
- Phylum: Arthropoda
- Clade: Pancrustacea
- Class: Insecta
- Order: Lepidoptera
- Superfamily: Noctuoidea
- Family: Erebidae
- Subfamily: Arctiinae
- Genus: Notata
- Species: N. parva

Binomial name
- Notata parva Hampson, 1891

= Notata parva =

Species of moth

Notata parva is a moth in the family Erebidae. It was described by George Hampson in 1891. It is found in India and on Sumatra, Java, Bali, Sumbawa, Borneo and the Philippines.
