= Aneflomorpha giesberti =

Scientific classification
- Domain: Eukaryota
- Kingdom: Animalia
- Phylum: Arthropoda
- Class: Insecta
- Order: Coleoptera
- Suborder: Polyphaga
- Infraorder: Cucujiformia
- Family: Cerambycidae
- Genus: Aneflomorpha
- Species: A. giesberti

Binomial name
- Aneflomorpha giesberti Chemsak & Linsley, 1975

Species of beetle

Aneflomorpha giesberti is a species of beetle in the family Cerambycidae. It was described by Chemsak and Linsley in 1975.
