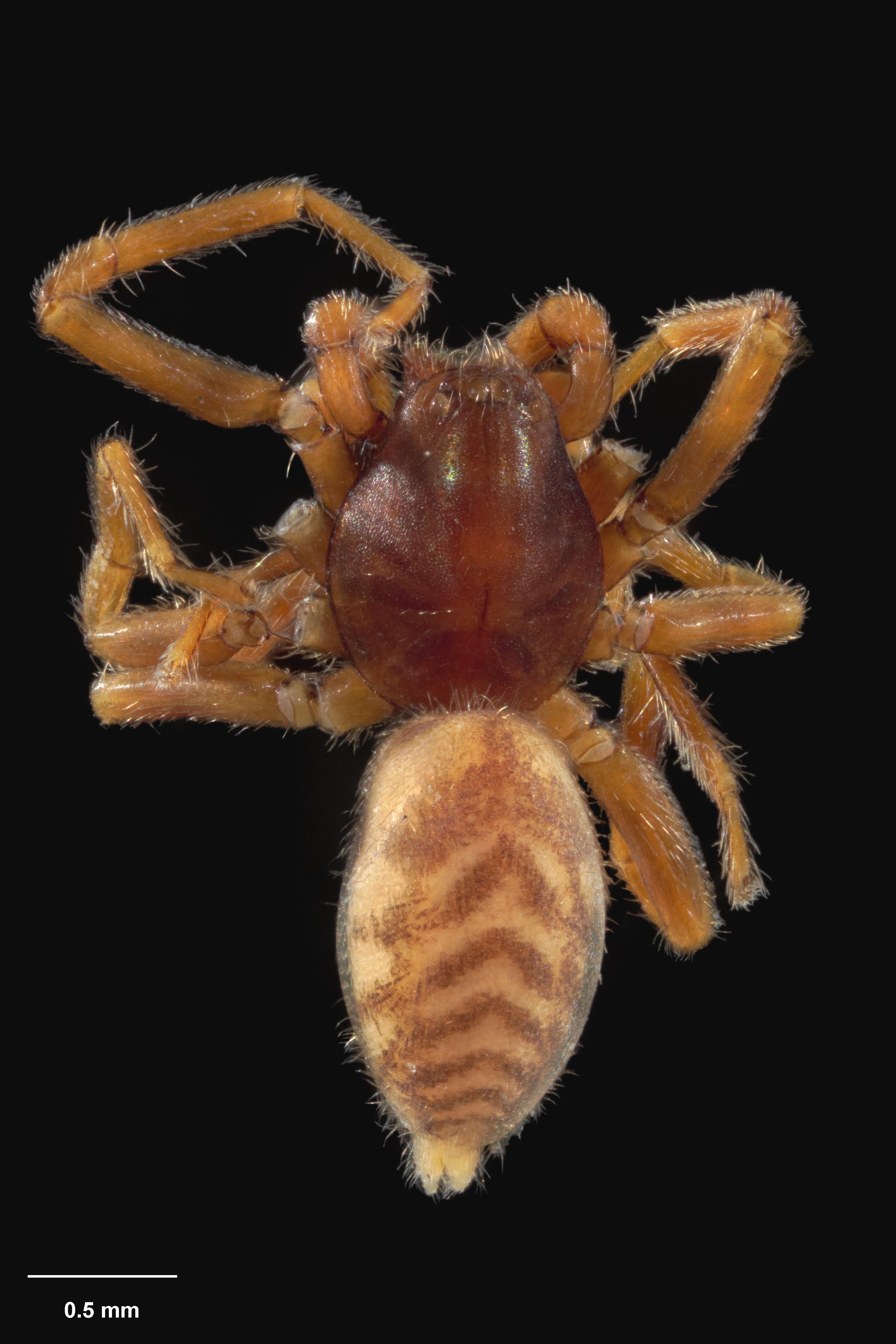

Conservation status
- Not Threatened (NZ TCS)

Scientific classification
- Kingdom: Animalia
- Phylum: Arthropoda
- Subphylum: Chelicerata
- Class: Arachnida
- Order: Araneae
- Infraorder: Araneomorphae
- Family: Orsolobidae
- Genus: Waiporia
- Species: W. mensa

Binomial name
- Waiporia mensa (Forster, 1956)

Synonyms
- Ascuta mensa

= Waiporia mensa =

Species of spider

Waiporia mensa is a species of Orsolobidae that is endemic to New Zealand.

== Taxonomy ==
This species was described as Ascuta mensa in 1956 by Ray Forster from male and female specimens collected in Nelson. In 1985, it was moved into the Waiporia genus. The holotype is stored in Te Papa Museum under registration number AS.000068.

== Description ==
The male is recorded at 2.21 mm in length whereas the female is 2.27 mm. This species has pale brown legs and a reddish brown carapace. The abdomen has a chevron pattern dorsally.

== Distribution ==
This species is only known from Nelson, New Zealand.

== Conservation status ==
Under the New Zealand Threat Classification System, this species is listed as "Not Threatened".
