= Rhodopina lewisii =

Scientific classification
- Domain: Eukaryota
- Kingdom: Animalia
- Phylum: Arthropoda
- Class: Insecta
- Order: Coleoptera
- Suborder: Polyphaga
- Infraorder: Cucujiformia
- Family: Cerambycidae
- Genus: Rhodopina
- Species: R. lewisii

Binomial name
- Rhodopina lewisii (Bates, 1873)

Species of beetle

Rhodopina lewisii is a species of beetle in the family Cerambycidae. It was described by Henry Walter Bates in 1873.

== Subspecies ==
- Rhodopina lewisii koshikijimana Komiya, 1984
- Rhodopina lewisii lewisii (Bates, 1873)
- Rhodopina lewisii yakushimana Komiya, 1984
