= Rhodopina sakishimana =

Scientific classification
- Domain: Eukaryota
- Kingdom: Animalia
- Phylum: Arthropoda
- Class: Insecta
- Order: Coleoptera
- Suborder: Polyphaga
- Infraorder: Cucujiformia
- Family: Cerambycidae
- Genus: Rhodopina
- Species: R. sakishimana

Binomial name
- Rhodopina sakishimana Yokoyama, 1966

Species of beetle

Rhodopina sakishimana is a species of beetle in the family Cerambycidae. It was described by Yokoyama in 1966. It is known from Japan.
