= Scaptesylodes =

Scientific classification
- Kingdom: Animalia
- Phylum: Arthropoda
- Class: Insecta
- Order: Lepidoptera
- Family: Crambidae
- Subfamily: Spilomelinae
- Genus: Scaptesylodes; Munroe, 1976

Genus of moths

Scaptesylodes is a genus of moths of the family Crambidae.

== Species ==
- Scaptesylodes incerta Semper, 1899
- Scaptesylodes modica Munroe, 1976
