= Aneflomorpha australis =

Scientific classification
- Domain: Eukaryota
- Kingdom: Animalia
- Phylum: Arthropoda
- Class: Insecta
- Order: Coleoptera
- Suborder: Polyphaga
- Infraorder: Cucujiformia
- Family: Cerambycidae
- Genus: Aneflomorpha
- Species: A. australis

Binomial name
- Aneflomorpha australis Linsley, 1942

Species of beetle

Aneflomorpha australis is a species of beetle in the family Cerambycidae. It was described by Linsley in 1942.
