= Waiporia extensa =

Conservation status
- Not Threatened (NZ TCS)

Scientific classification
- Kingdom: Animalia
- Phylum: Arthropoda
- Subphylum: Chelicerata
- Class: Arachnida
- Order: Araneae
- Infraorder: Araneomorphae
- Family: Orsolobidae
- Genus: Waiporia
- Species: W. extensa

Binomial name
- Waiporia extensa (Forster, 1956)

Synonyms
- Ascuta extensa

Species of spider

Waiporia extensa is a species of Orsolobidae that is endemic to New Zealand.

== Taxonomy ==
This species was described as Ascuta extensa in 1956 by Ray Forster from male and female specimens collected in Canterbury. In 1985, it was moved into the Waiporia genus. The holotype is stored in Canterbury Museum.

== Description ==
The male is 2.11 mm in length whereas the female is 2.24 mm. This species has yellow brown legs and an orange brown carapace with dorsal markings. The abdomen is creamy white with chevron patterns dorsally.

== Distribution ==
This species is only known from Canterbury, New Zealand.

== Conservation status ==
Under the New Zealand Threat Classification System, this species is listed as "Not Threatened".
