= Apatophysis danczenkoi =

Scientific classification
- Kingdom: Animalia
- Phylum: Arthropoda
- Class: Insecta
- Order: Coleoptera
- Suborder: Polyphaga
- Infraorder: Cucujiformia
- Family: Cerambycidae
- Genus: Apatophysis
- Species: A. danczenkoi

Binomial name
- Apatophysis danczenkoi Danilevsky, 2006

Species of beetle

Apatophysis danczenkoi is a species of beetle in the family Cerambycidae, in the subgenus Angustephysis. It can be found in Iran.
