= Besleria miniata =

Conservation status
- Data Deficient (IUCN 3.1)

Scientific classification
- Kingdom: Plantae
- Clade: Tracheophytes
- Clade: Angiosperms
- Clade: Eudicots
- Clade: Asterids
- Order: Lamiales
- Family: Gesneriaceae
- Genus: Besleria
- Species: B. miniata

Binomial name
- Besleria miniata C.V.Morton

Species of flowering plant

Besleria miniata is a species of plant in the family Gesneriaceae. It is endemic to Ecuador. Its natural habitat is subtropical or tropical moist lowland forests.
