= Apatophysis =

Scientific classification
- Domain: Eukaryota
- Kingdom: Animalia
- Phylum: Arthropoda
- Class: Insecta
- Order: Coleoptera
- Suborder: Polyphaga
- Infraorder: Cucujiformia
- Family: Cerambycidae
- Subfamily: Apatophyseinae
- Tribe: Apatophyseini
- Genus: Apatophysis; Chevrolat, 1860

Genus of beetles

Apatophysis is a genus of longhorn beetles in the subfamily Dorcasominae.

== Species ==
Catalogue of Life accepts the following species within Apatophysis:

subgenus Angustephysis Pic, 1956

1. Apatophysis danczenkoi Danilevsky, 2006
2. Apatophysis farsicola Sama, Fallahzadeh & Rapuzzi, 2005
3. Apatophysis margiana Semenov & Barovskaya, 1935
4. Apatophysis modica Gahan, 1906
5. Apatophysis richteri Pic, 1956

subgenus Apatophysis Chevrolat, 1860

1. Apatophysis afghanica Miroshnikov, 2014
2. Apatophysis anatolica Heyrovský, 1938
3. Apatophysis baeckmanniana Semenov, 1907
4. Apatophysis barbara (Lucas, 1858) - type species
5. Apatophysis caspica Semenov, 1901
6. Apatophysis centralis Semenov, 1901
7. Apatophysis hotanica Danilevsky, 2008
8. Apatophysis insolita Miroshnikov & Lin, 2017
9. Apatophysis kadleci Danilevsky, 2008
10. Apatophysis karsica Danilevsky, 2008
11. Apatophysis kashgarica Semenov, 1901
12. Apatophysis katbehi Rapuzzi & Sama, 2013
13. Apatophysis komarowi Semenov, 1889
14. Apatophysis niisatoi Miroshnikov & Lin, 2017
15. Apatophysis pavlovskii Plavilstshikov, 1954
16. Apatophysis roborowskii Semenov, 1901
17. Apatophysis serricornis Gebler, 1843
18. Apatophysis sieversi Ganglbauer, 1887
19. Apatophysis sinica Semenov, 1901
20. Apatophysis vedica Danilevsky, 2008
21. Apatophysis xizangensis Miroshnikov & Lin, 2017
