= Apatophysis sieversi =

Scientific classification
- Kingdom: Animalia
- Phylum: Arthropoda
- Clade: Pancrustacea
- Class: Insecta
- Order: Coleoptera
- Suborder: Polyphaga
- Infraorder: Cucujiformia
- Family: Cerambycidae
- Genus: Apatophysis
- Species: A. sieversi

Binomial name
- Apatophysis sieversi Ganglbauer, 1887

Species of beetle

Apatophysis sieversi is a species of beetle in the family Cerambycidae, in the genus Apatophysis.
