= Aneflomorpha delongi =

Scientific classification
- Domain: Eukaryota
- Kingdom: Animalia
- Phylum: Arthropoda
- Class: Insecta
- Order: Coleoptera
- Suborder: Polyphaga
- Infraorder: Cucujiformia
- Family: Cerambycidae
- Genus: Aneflomorpha
- Species: A. delongi

Binomial name
- Aneflomorpha delongi (Champlain & Knull, 1922)

Species of beetle

Aneflomorpha delongi is a species of beetle in the family Cerambycidae, which was described by Champlain and Knull in 1922.
