= Rhodopina griseipes =

Scientific classification
- Kingdom: Animalia
- Phylum: Arthropoda
- Class: Insecta
- Order: Coleoptera
- Suborder: Polyphaga
- Infraorder: Cucujiformia
- Family: Cerambycidae
- Genus: Rhodopina
- Species: R. griseipes

Binomial name
- Rhodopina griseipes Breuning, 1963

Species of beetle

Rhodopina griseipes is a species of beetle in the family Cerambycidae. It was described by Stephan von Breuning in 1963.
