= Rhodopina pubera =

Scientific classification
- Domain: Eukaryota
- Kingdom: Animalia
- Phylum: Arthropoda
- Class: Insecta
- Order: Coleoptera
- Suborder: Polyphaga
- Infraorder: Cucujiformia
- Family: Cerambycidae
- Genus: Rhodopina
- Species: R. pubera

Binomial name
- Rhodopina pubera (Thomson, 1857)

Synonyms
- Rhodopis pubera Thomson, 1857

Species of beetle

Rhodopina pubera is a species of beetle in the family Cerambycidae, and is the type species of its genus. It was described by James Thomson in 1857. It is known from India.
