= Rhodopina blairi =

Scientific classification
- Kingdom: Animalia
- Phylum: Arthropoda
- Clade: Pancrustacea
- Class: Insecta
- Order: Coleoptera
- Suborder: Polyphaga
- Infraorder: Cucujiformia
- Family: Cerambycidae
- Genus: Rhodopina
- Species: R. blairi

Binomial name
- Rhodopina blairi (Gressitt, 1937)

Synonyms
- Rhodopis blairi Gressitt, 1937

Species of beetle

Rhodopina blairi is a species of beetle in the family Cerambycidae. It was described by Gressitt in 1937. It is found in China.
