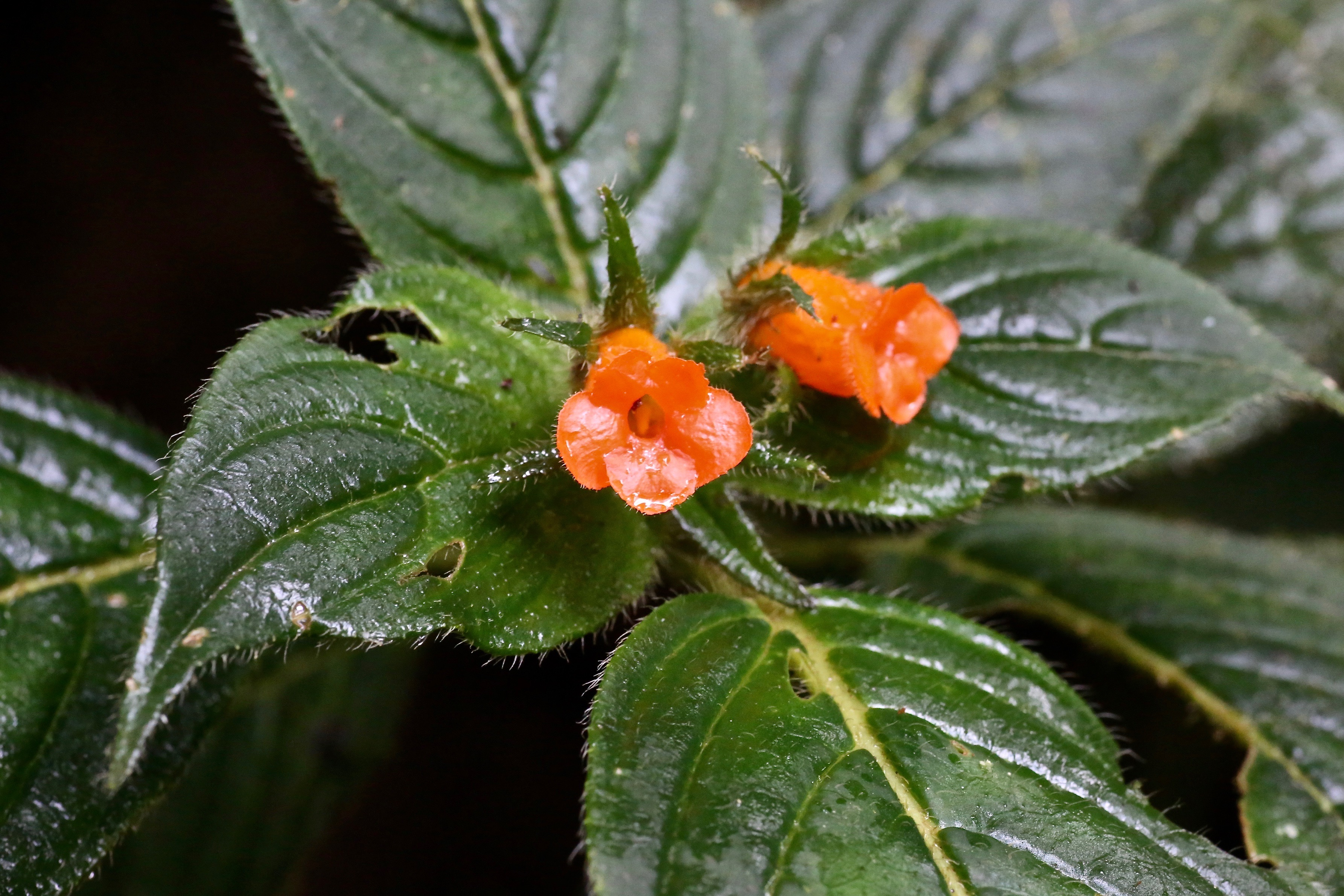

Conservation status
- Least Concern (IUCN 3.1)

Scientific classification
- Kingdom: Plantae
- Clade: Tracheophytes
- Clade: Angiosperms
- Clade: Eudicots
- Clade: Asterids
- Order: Lamiales
- Family: Gesneriaceae
- Genus: Besleria
- Species: B. comosa

Binomial name
- Besleria comosa C.V.Morton

= Besleria comosa =

Species of flowering plant

Besleria comosa is a species of plant in the family Gesneriaceae. It is endemic to Ecuador.

Its natural habitats are subtropical or tropical moist lowland forests and subtropical or tropical moist montane forests.
