= Aneflomorpha lineare =

Scientific classification
- Domain: Eukaryota
- Kingdom: Animalia
- Phylum: Arthropoda
- Class: Insecta
- Order: Coleoptera
- Suborder: Polyphaga
- Infraorder: Cucujiformia
- Family: Cerambycidae
- Genus: Aneflomorpha
- Species: A. lineare

Binomial name
- Aneflomorpha lineare (LeConte, 1859)

Species of beetle

Aneflomorpha lineare is a species of beetle in the family Cerambycidae. It was described by John Lawrence LeConte in 1859.
