= Waiporia algida =

Conservation status
- Data Deficit (NZ TCS)

Scientific classification
- Kingdom: Animalia
- Phylum: Arthropoda
- Subphylum: Chelicerata
- Class: Arachnida
- Order: Araneae
- Infraorder: Araneomorphae
- Family: Orsolobidae
- Genus: Waiporia
- Species: W. algida

Binomial name
- Waiporia algida (Forster, 1956)

Synonyms
- Ascuta algida Forster, 1956

Species of spider

Waiporia algida is a species of Orsolobid spider that is endemic to New Zealand.

== Taxonomy ==
This species was described as Ascuta algida in 1956 by Ray Forster from male and female specimens collected in Canterbury. In 1985, it was moved from the genus Ascuta into the genus Waiporia. The holotype is stored in Canterbury Museum.

== Description ==
The male is recorded at 1.89 mm in length whereas the female is 2.50 mm. This species has pale yellow brown legs and an orange brown carapace with markings near the eyes. The abdomen is also creamy white with chevron patterns dorsally.

== Distribution ==
This species is only known from Canterbury, New Zealand.

== Conservation status ==
Under the New Zealand Threat Classification System, this species is listed as "Data Deficient" with the qualifiers of "Data Poor: Size" and "Data Poor: Trend".
