= Aneflomorpha =

Scientific classification
- Kingdom: Animalia
- Phylum: Arthropoda
- Class: Insecta
- Order: Coleoptera
- Suborder: Polyphaga
- Infraorder: Cucujiformia
- Family: Cerambycidae
- Subfamily: Cerambycinae
- Tribe: Elaphidiini
- Genus: Aneflomorpha; Casey, 1912

Genus of beetles

Aneflomorpha is a genus of beetles in the family Cerambycidae, containing the following species:

- Aneflomorpha aculeata (LeConte, 1873)
- Aneflomorpha arizonica Linsley, 1936
- Aneflomorpha australis Linsley, 1942
- Aneflomorpha brevipila Chemsak & Noguera, 2005
- Aneflomorpha cazieri Chemsak, 1962
- Aneflomorpha citrana Chemsak, 1960
- Aneflomorpha cribellata (Bates, 1892)
- Aneflomorpha crinita Chemsak & Linsley, 1975
- Aneflomorpha delongi (Champlain & Knull, 1922)
- Aneflomorpha exilis Chemsak & Noguera, 2005
- Aneflomorpha fisheri Linsley, 1936
- Aneflomorpha giesberti Chemsak & Linsley, 1975
- Aneflomorpha gilana Casey, 1924
- Aneflomorpha gracilis (Linsley, 1935)
- Aneflomorpha grandicolle (Linsley, 1942)
- Aneflomorpha hovorei Chemsak & Noguera, 2005
- Aneflomorpha lineare (LeConte, 1859)
- Aneflomorpha linsleyae Chemsak, 1962
- Aneflomorpha longispina Chemsak & Noguera, 2005
- Aneflomorpha longitudinis Chemsak & Noguera, 2005
- Aneflomorpha luteicornis Linsley, 1957
- Aneflomorpha martini Chemsak & Linsley, 1968
- Aneflomorpha mexicana (Linsley, 1935)
- Aneflomorpha minuta Chemsak, 1962
- Aneflomorpha modica Chemsak & Noguera, 2005
- Aneflomorpha opacicornis Linsley, 1957
- Aneflomorpha parkeri Knull, 1934
- Aneflomorpha parowana Casey, 1924
- Aneflomorpha parvipunctata Chemsak & Noguera, 2005
- Aneflomorpha preclara Chemsak & Linsley, 1975
- Aneflomorpha pueblae Chemsak & Noguera, 2005
- Aneflomorpha rectilinea Casey, 1924
- Aneflomorpha rosaliae Linsley, 1942
- Aneflomorpha ruficollis Chemsak & Linsley, 1975
- Aneflomorpha rufipes Chemsak & Linsley, 1968
- Aneflomorpha seminuda Casey, 1912
- Aneflomorpha semirufa Linsley, 1935
- Aneflomorpha subpubescens (LeConte, 1862)
- Aneflomorpha tenuis (LeConte, 1854)
- Aneflomorpha unispinosa Casey, 1912
- Aneflomorpha volitans (LeConte, 1873)
- Aneflomorpha wappesi Chemsak & Noguera, 2005
- Aneflomorpha werneri Chemsak, 1962
