= Waiporia hornabrooki =

Conservation status
- Naturally Uncommon (NZ TCS)

Scientific classification
- Kingdom: Animalia
- Phylum: Arthropoda
- Subphylum: Chelicerata
- Class: Arachnida
- Order: Araneae
- Infraorder: Araneomorphae
- Family: Orsolobidae
- Genus: Waiporia
- Species: W. hornabrooki

Binomial name
- Waiporia hornabrooki (Forster, 1956)

Synonyms
- Pounamua hornabrooki

Species of spider

Waiporia hornabrooki is a species of six-eyed spider that is endemic to New Zealand.

== Taxonomy ==
This species was described as Pounamua hornabrooki in 1956 by Ray Forster from male and female specimens collected in Fiordland. In 1985, it was moved into the Waiporia genus. The holotype is stored in Canterbury Museum.

== Description ==
The male is recorded at 1.93 mm in length, whereas the female is 2.62 mm. This species has light brown legs and brown carapace, with marking around the eyes. The abdomen has chevron patterns dorsally.

== Distribution ==
This species is only known from Fiordland, New Zealand.

== Conservation status ==
Under the New Zealand Threat Classification System, this species is listed as "Naturally Uncommon" with the qualifiers of "Data Poor: Size" and "Data Poor: Trend".
