= Rhodopina piperita =

Scientific classification
- Domain: Eukaryota
- Kingdom: Animalia
- Phylum: Arthropoda
- Class: Insecta
- Order: Coleoptera
- Suborder: Polyphaga
- Infraorder: Cucujiformia
- Family: Cerambycidae
- Genus: Rhodopina
- Species: R. piperita

Binomial name
- Rhodopina piperita (Gahan, 1890)

Species of beetle

Rhodopina piperita is a species of beetle in the family Cerambycidae. It was described by Charles Joseph Gahan in 1890.
