= Apatophysis kadleci =

Scientific classification
- Kingdom: Animalia
- Phylum: Arthropoda
- Class: Insecta
- Order: Coleoptera
- Suborder: Polyphaga
- Infraorder: Cucujiformia
- Family: Cerambycidae
- Genus: Apatophysis
- Species: A. kadleci

Binomial name
- Apatophysis kadleci Danilevsky, 2008

Species of beetle

Apatophysis kadleci is a species of beetle in the family Cerambycidae, in the subgenus Apatophysis. It is endemic to Turkey.
