= Scaptesylodes incerta =

Scientific classification
- Kingdom: Animalia
- Phylum: Arthropoda
- Class: Insecta
- Order: Lepidoptera
- Family: Crambidae
- Genus: Scaptesylodes
- Species: S. incerta

Binomial name
- Scaptesylodes incerta (Semper, 1899)

Synonyms
- Scaptesyle incerta Semper, 1899

Species of moth

Scaptesylodes incerta is a moth in the family Crambidae. It was first described by Georg Semper in 1899 and it is found on Mindanao in the Philippines.
