= Besleria elegans =

Scientific classification
- Kingdom: Plantae
- Clade: Tracheophytes
- Clade: Angiosperms
- Clade: Eudicots
- Clade: Asterids
- Order: Lamiales
- Family: Gesneriaceae
- Genus: Besleria
- Species: B. elegans

Binomial name
- Besleria elegans Kunth, 1818

Species of flowering plant

Besleria elegans is a species of flowering plants in the family Gesneriaceae. It is found in Bolivia.
