= Aneflomorpha seminuda =

Scientific classification
- Kingdom: Animalia
- Phylum: Arthropoda
- Class: Insecta
- Order: Coleoptera
- Suborder: Polyphaga
- Infraorder: Cucujiformia
- Family: Cerambycidae
- Genus: Aneflomorpha
- Species: A. seminuda

Binomial name
- Aneflomorpha seminuda Casey, 1912

Species of beetle

Aneflomorpha seminuda is a species of beetle in the family Cerambycidae. It was described by Casey in 1912.
