= Aneflomorpha rectilinea =

Scientific classification
- Kingdom: Animalia
- Phylum: Arthropoda
- Class: Insecta
- Order: Coleoptera
- Suborder: Polyphaga
- Infraorder: Cucujiformia
- Family: Cerambycidae
- Genus: Aneflomorpha
- Species: A. rectilinea

Binomial name
- Aneflomorpha rectilinea Casey, 1924

Species of beetle

Aneflomorpha rectilinea is a species of beetle in the family Cerambycidae. It was described by Casey in 1924.
