= Apatophysis margiana =

Scientific classification
- Domain: Eukaryota
- Kingdom: Animalia
- Phylum: Arthropoda
- Class: Insecta
- Order: Coleoptera
- Suborder: Polyphaga
- Infraorder: Cucujiformia
- Family: Cerambycidae
- Genus: Apatophysis
- Species: A. margiana

Binomial name
- Apatophysis margiana Semenov & Schegoleva-Barovskaya, 1936

Subspecies
- Apatophysis margiana margiana

Species of beetle

Apatophysis margiana is a species of beetle in the family Cerambycidae, in the subgenus Apatophysis. It is founded in Central Asia, including Afghanistan, Kazakhstan, and Uzbekistan.
