= Aneflomorpha citrana =

Scientific classification
- Domain: Eukaryota
- Kingdom: Animalia
- Phylum: Arthropoda
- Class: Insecta
- Order: Coleoptera
- Suborder: Polyphaga
- Infraorder: Cucujiformia
- Family: Cerambycidae
- Genus: Aneflomorpha
- Species: A. citrana

Binomial name
- Aneflomorpha citrana Chemsak, 1960

Species of beetle

Aneflomorpha citrana is a species of beetle in the family Cerambycidae. It was described by Chemsak in 1960.
