= Aneflomorpha grandicolle =

Scientific classification
- Domain: Eukaryota
- Kingdom: Animalia
- Phylum: Arthropoda
- Class: Insecta
- Order: Coleoptera
- Suborder: Polyphaga
- Infraorder: Cucujiformia
- Family: Cerambycidae
- Genus: Aneflomorpha
- Species: A. grandicolle

Binomial name
- Aneflomorpha grandicolle (Linsley, 1942)

Species of beetle

Aneflomorpha grandicolle is a species of beetle in the family Cerambycidae. It was described by Linsley in 1942.
