= Waiporia tuata =

Conservation status
- Data Deficit (NZ TCS)

Scientific classification
- Kingdom: Animalia
- Phylum: Arthropoda
- Subphylum: Chelicerata
- Class: Arachnida
- Order: Araneae
- Infraorder: Araneomorphae
- Family: Orsolobidae
- Genus: Waiporia
- Species: W. tuata

Binomial name
- Waiporia tuata Forster & Platnick, 1985

Species of spider

Waiporia tuata is a species of Orsolobidae that is endemic to New Zealand.

== Taxonomy ==
This species was described in 1985 by Ray Forster and Norman Platnick from male and female specimens collected in Southland. The holotype is stored in Otago Museum.

== Description ==
The male is recorded at 2.16 mm in length whereas the female is 2.76 mm. The abdomen has a chevron pattern dorsally.

== Distribution ==
This species is only known from Tuatapere in Southland, New Zealand.

== Conservation status ==
Under the New Zealand Threat Classification System, this species is listed as "Data Deficient" with the qualifiers of "Data Poor: Recognition", "Data Poor: Size" and "Data Poor: Trend".
