= Aneflomorpha arizonica =

Scientific classification
- Domain: Eukaryota
- Kingdom: Animalia
- Phylum: Arthropoda
- Class: Insecta
- Order: Coleoptera
- Suborder: Polyphaga
- Infraorder: Cucujiformia
- Family: Cerambycidae
- Genus: Aneflomorpha
- Species: A. arizonica

Binomial name
- Aneflomorpha arizonica Linsley, 1936

Species of beetle

Aneflomorpha arizonica is a species of beetle in the family Cerambycidae. It was described by Linsley in 1936.
