= Apatophysis barbara =

Scientific classification
- Domain: Eukaryota
- Kingdom: Animalia
- Phylum: Arthropoda
- Class: Insecta
- Order: Coleoptera
- Suborder: Polyphaga
- Infraorder: Cucujiformia
- Family: Cerambycidae
- Subfamily: Apatophyseinae
- Tribe: Apatophyseini
- Genus: Apatophysis
- Species: A. barbara

Binomial name
- Apatophysis barbara (Lucas, 1858)

Synonyms
- Apatophysis ocularis 1901; Apatophysis toxotoïdes Lucas, 1877; Apatophysis toxotoïdes Lacordaire, 1869; Apatophysis toxotoïdes Thomson, 1864; Apatophysis toxotoïdes Mulsant & Rey, 1863; Apatophysis toxotoïdes Chevrolat, 1860; Polyarthron barbarum Lucas, 1858 (basionym)

Species of beetle

Apatophysis barbara is a species of African longhorn beetle in the tribe Apatophyseini with records from Algeria and Tunisia. It is the type species in the subgenus Apatophysis.
