= Waiporia wiltoni =

Conservation status
- Naturally Uncommon (NZ TCS)

Scientific classification
- Kingdom: Animalia
- Phylum: Arthropoda
- Subphylum: Chelicerata
- Class: Arachnida
- Order: Araneae
- Infraorder: Araneomorphae
- Family: Orsolobidae
- Genus: Waiporia
- Species: W. wiltoni

Binomial name
- Waiporia wiltoni Forster & Platnick, 1985

Species of spider

Waiporia wiltoni is a species of Orsolobidae that is endemic to New Zealand.

== Taxonomy ==
This species was described in 1985 by Ray Forster and Norman Platnick from male and female specimens collected in Otago. The holotype is stored in Otago Museum.

== Description ==
The male is recorded at 2.00 mm in length whereas the female is 2.12 mm. This species has dorsal markings on the abdomen.

== Distribution ==
This species is only known from Otago, New Zealand.

== Conservation status ==
Under the New Zealand Threat Classification System, this species is listed as "Naturally Uncommon" with the qualifiers of "Data Poor: Size" and "Data Poor: Trend".
