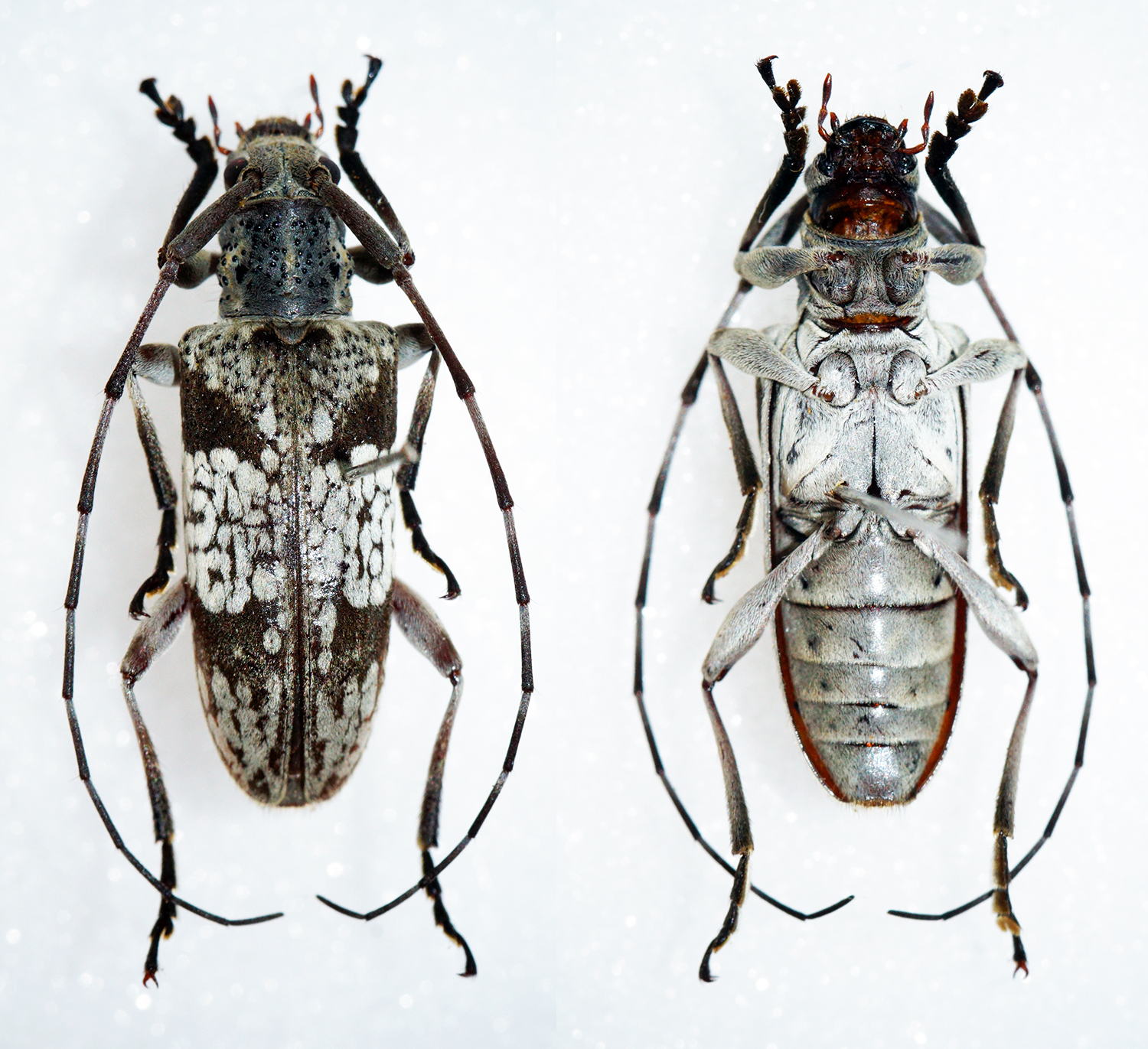

Scientific classification
- Kingdom: Animalia
- Phylum: Arthropoda
- Class: Insecta
- Order: Coleoptera
- Suborder: Polyphaga
- Infraorder: Cucujiformia
- Family: Cerambycidae
- Subfamily: Lamiinae
- Tribe: Desmiphorini
- Genus: Rhodopina; Gressitt, 1951

= Rhodopina =

Genus of beetles

Rhodopina is a genus of longhorn beetles of the subfamily Lamiinae, containing the following species:

- Rhodopina albomaculata Gahan, 1890
- Rhodopina albomarmorata Breuning, 1958
- Rhodopina alboplagiata (Gahan, 1890)
- Rhodopina andrewesi (Breuning, 1936)
- Rhodopina assamana Breuning, 1966
- Rhodopina assamensis Breuning, 1966
- Rhodopina blairi (Gressitt, 1937)
- Rhodopina formosana (Breuning, 1954)
- Rhodopina fruhstorferi (Breuning, 1961)
- Rhodopina griseipes Breuning, 1963
- Rhodopina integripennis (Bates, 1884)
- Rhodopina japonica (Breuning, 1940)
- Rhodopina javana (Aurivillius, 1907)
- Rhodopina laevepunctata Breuning, 1958
- Rhodopina lewisii (Bates, 1873)
- Rhodopina maculosa (Pic, 1934)
- Rhodopina manipurensis Breuning, 1971
- Rhodopina meshimensis Makihara, 1980
- Rhodopina modica Komiya, 1984
- Rhodopina nasui Komiya & Kusama, 1974
- Rhodopina nilghirica (Breuning, 1939)
- Rhodopina okinawensis (Matsushita, 1933)
- Rhodopina okinoerabuana Hayashi, 1966
- Rhodopina pahangensis Breuning, 1961
- Rhodopina paraseriata Breuning, 1969
- Rhodopina parassamensis Breuning, 1975
- Rhodopina pedongensis Breuning, 1969
- Rhodopina perakensis Breuning, 1970
- Rhodopina piperita (Gahan, 1890)
- Rhodopina pubera (Thomson, 1857)
- Rhodopina pubereoides (Breuning, 1956)
- Rhodopina quadrituberculata (Aurivillius, 1920)
- Rhodopina sakishimana Yokoyama, 1966
- Rhodopina seriata (Aurivillius, 1913)
- Rhodopina seriatoides (Breuning, 1938)
- Rhodopina similis (Breuning, 1940)
- Rhodopina subuniformis Gressitt, 1951
- Rhodopina tokarensis Hayashi, 1956
- Rhodopina tonkinensis (Breuning, 1936)
- Rhodopina tuberculicollis (Gressitt, 1942)
- Rhodopina tubericollis (Breuning, 1943)
