= Notata =

Scientific classification
- Kingdom: Animalia
- Phylum: Arthropoda
- Class: Insecta
- Order: Lepidoptera
- Superfamily: Noctuoidea
- Family: Erebidae
- Subfamily: Arctiinae
- Tribe: Lithosiini
- Genus: Notata; Hampson, 1891

Synonyms
- Diphtheraspis Meyrick, 1892

Genus of moths

Notata is a genus of moths in the subfamily Arctiinae.

== Species ==
- Notata modicus (Lucas, 1892)
- Notata parva Hampson, 1891
- Notata zumkehri de Vos & van Mastrigt, 2007
