= Waiporia owaka =

Conservation status
- Naturally Uncommon (NZ TCS)

Scientific classification
- Kingdom: Animalia
- Phylum: Arthropoda
- Subphylum: Chelicerata
- Class: Arachnida
- Order: Araneae
- Infraorder: Araneomorphae
- Family: Orsolobidae
- Genus: Waiporia
- Species: W. owaka

Binomial name
- Waiporia owaka Forster & Platnick, 1985

Species of spider

Waiporia owaka is a species of Orsolobidae that is endemic to New Zealand.

== Taxonomy ==
This species was described in 1985 by Ray Forster and Norman Platnick from male and female specimens collected in the Catlins. The holotype is stored in Otago Museum.

== Description ==
The male is recorded at 2.40 mm in length whereas the female is 2.64 mm. The abdomen is patterned dorsally.

== Distribution ==
This species is only known from the Catlins, New Zealand.

== Conservation status ==
Under the New Zealand Threat Classification System, this species is listed as "Naturally Uncommon" with the qualifier "Range Restricted".
