= Rhodopina assamensis =

Scientific classification
- Kingdom: Animalia
- Phylum: Arthropoda
- Clade: Pancrustacea
- Class: Insecta
- Order: Coleoptera
- Suborder: Polyphaga
- Infraorder: Cucujiformia
- Family: Cerambycidae
- Genus: Rhodopina
- Species: R. assamensis

Binomial name
- Rhodopina assamensis Breuning, 1966

Species of beetle

Rhodopina assamensis is a species of beetle in the family Cerambycidae. It was described by Stephan von Breuning in 1966. It is found in India.
