= Waiporia chathamensis =

Conservation status
- Naturally Uncommon (NZ TCS)

Scientific classification
- Kingdom: Animalia
- Phylum: Arthropoda
- Subphylum: Chelicerata
- Class: Arachnida
- Order: Araneae
- Infraorder: Araneomorphae
- Family: Orsolobidae
- Genus: Waiporia
- Species: W. chathamensis

Binomial name
- Waiporia chathamensis Forster & Platnick, 1985

Species of spider

Waiporia chathamensis is a species of Orsolobidae that is endemic to New Zealand.

== Taxonomy ==
This species was described in 1985 by Ray Forster and Norman Platnick from male and female specimens collected in the Chatham Islands. The holotype is stored in the New Zealand Arthropod Collection under registration number NZAC03015011.

== Description ==
The male is recorded at 2.64 mm in length whereas the female is 3.05 mm. The abdomen is patterned dorsally.

== Distribution ==
This species is only known from the Chatham Islands.

== Conservation status ==
Under the New Zealand Threat Classification System, this species is listed as "Naturally Uncommon" with the qualifiers of "Island Endemic".
