= Rhodopina tokarensis =

Scientific classification
- Kingdom: Animalia
- Phylum: Arthropoda
- Class: Insecta
- Order: Coleoptera
- Suborder: Polyphaga
- Infraorder: Cucujiformia
- Family: Cerambycidae
- Genus: Rhodopina
- Species: R. tokarensis

Binomial name
- Rhodopina tokarensis Hayashi, 1956

Species of beetle

Rhodopina tokarensis is a species of beetle in the family Cerambycidae. It was described by Masao Hayashi in 1956.

== Subspecies ==
- Rhodopina tokarensis tokarensis Hayashi, 1956
- Rhodopina tokarensis komiyai Hayashi, 1969
- Rhodopina tokarensis orientalis Yokoyama, 1971
- Rhodopina tokarensis obscura Makihara, 1977
