= Rhodopina tonkinensis =

Scientific classification
- Kingdom: Animalia
- Phylum: Arthropoda
- Class: Insecta
- Order: Coleoptera
- Suborder: Polyphaga
- Infraorder: Cucujiformia
- Family: Cerambycidae
- Genus: Rhodopina
- Species: R. tonkinensis

Binomial name
- Rhodopina tonkinensis (Breuning, 1936)

Species of beetle

Rhodopina tonkinensis is a species of beetle in the family Cerambycidae. It was described by Stephan von Breuning in 1936.
