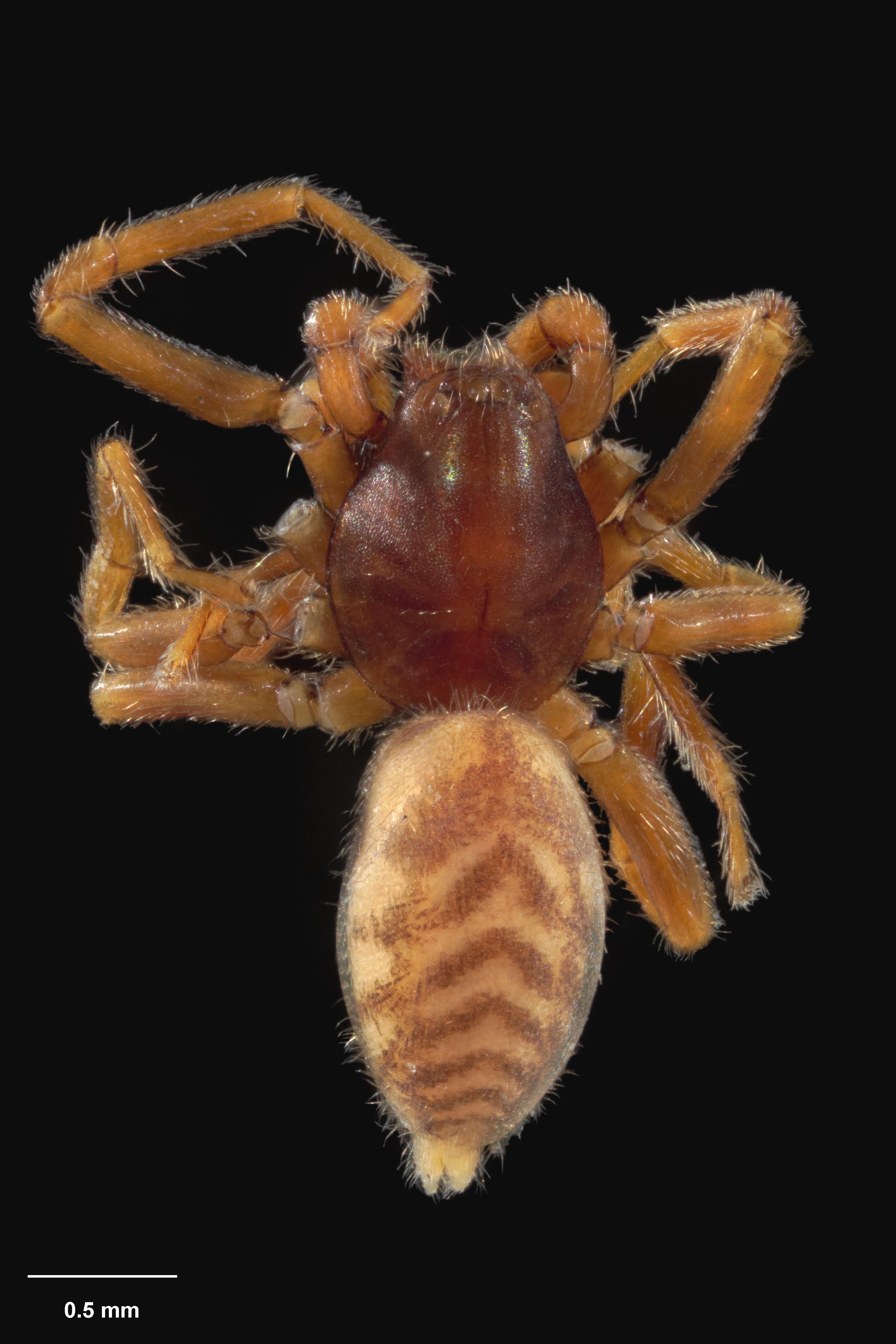

Scientific classification
- Kingdom: Animalia
- Phylum: Arthropoda
- Subphylum: Chelicerata
- Class: Arachnida
- Order: Araneae
- Infraorder: Araneomorphae
- Family: Orsolobidae
- Genus: Waiporia; Forster & Platnick, 1985

Type species
- W. wiltoni Forster & Platnick, 1985

Species
- 12, see text

= Waiporia =

Genus of spiders

Waiporia is a genus of Polynesian araneomorph spiders in the family Orsolobidae, and was first described by Raymond Robert Forster & Norman I. Platnick in 1985.

== Species ==
As of June 2019 it contains twelve species, found only in New Zealand:

- Waiporia algida (Forster, 1956) – New Zealand
- Waiporia chathamensis Forster & Platnick, 1985 – New Zealand (Chatham Is.)
- Waiporia egmont Forster & Platnick, 1985 – New Zealand
- Waiporia extensa (Forster, 1956) – New Zealand
- Waiporia hawea Forster & Platnick, 1985 – New Zealand
- Waiporia hornabrooki (Forster, 1956) – New Zealand
- Waiporia mensa (Forster, 1956) – New Zealand
- Waiporia modica (Forster, 1956) – New Zealand
- Waiporia owaka Forster & Platnick, 1985 – New Zealand
- Waiporia ruahine Forster & Platnick, 1985 – New Zealand
- Waiporia tuata Forster & Platnick, 1985 – New Zealand
- Waiporia wiltoni Forster & Platnick, 1985 (type) – New Zealand
