= Notata zumkehri =

Scientific classification
- Domain: Eukaryota
- Kingdom: Animalia
- Phylum: Arthropoda
- Class: Insecta
- Order: Lepidoptera
- Superfamily: Noctuoidea
- Family: Erebidae
- Subfamily: Arctiinae
- Genus: Notata
- Species: N. zumkehri

Binomial name
- Notata zumkehri De Vos & van Mastrigt, 2007

Species of moth

Notata zumkehri is a moth in the family Erebidae. It was described by Rob de Vos and Henricus Jacobus Gerardus van Mastrigt in 2007. It is found in Papua New Guinea.

The wingspan is about 15 millimetres (0.59 in).

== Etymology ==
The species is named in honour of Piet Zumkehr who discovered the new species during an expedition in 2005.
