= Rhodopina nasui =

Scientific classification
- Domain: Eukaryota
- Kingdom: Animalia
- Phylum: Arthropoda
- Class: Insecta
- Order: Coleoptera
- Suborder: Polyphaga
- Infraorder: Cucujiformia
- Family: Cerambycidae
- Genus: Rhodopina
- Species: R. nasui

Binomial name
- Rhodopina nasui Komiya & Kusama, 1974

Species of beetle

Rhodopina nasui is a species of beetle in the family Cerambycidae. It was described by Komiya and Kusama in 1974.
