= Rhodopina modica =

Scientific classification
- Domain: Eukaryota
- Kingdom: Animalia
- Phylum: Arthropoda
- Class: Insecta
- Order: Coleoptera
- Suborder: Polyphaga
- Infraorder: Cucujiformia
- Family: Cerambycidae
- Genus: Rhodopina
- Species: R. modica

Binomial name
- Rhodopina modica Komiya, 1984

Species of beetle

Rhodopina modica is a species of beetle in the family Cerambycidae. It was described by Komiya in 1984.
