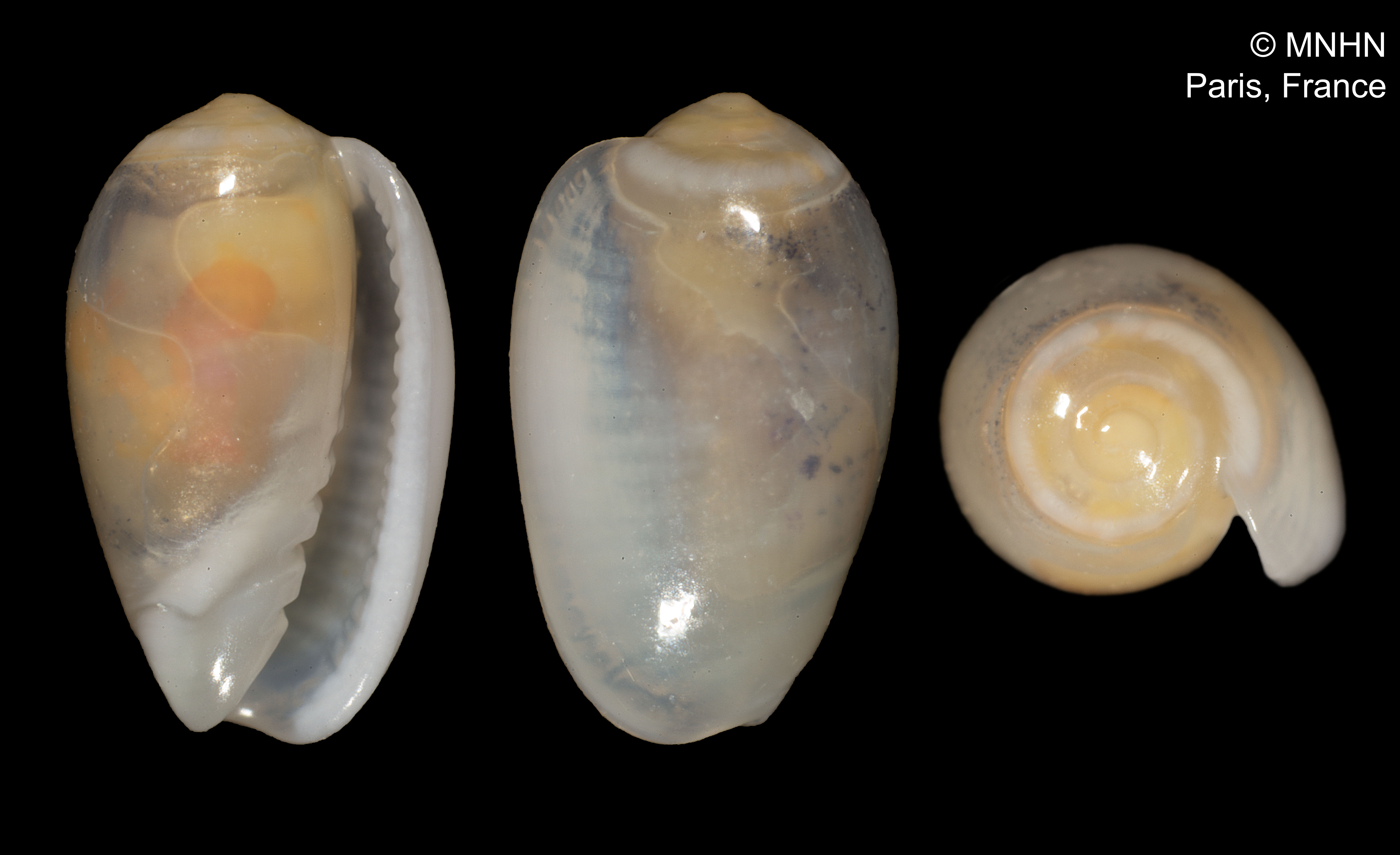

Conservation status
- Data Deficient (IUCN 2.3)

Scientific classification
- Kingdom: Animalia
- Phylum: Mollusca
- Class: Gastropoda
- Subclass: Caenogastropoda
- Order: Neogastropoda
- Family: Cystiscidae
- Subfamily: Cystiscinae
- Genus: Gibberula
- Species: G. modica

Binomial name
- Gibberula modica Gofas & Fernandes, 1988

= Gibberula modica =

Species of gastropod

Gibberula modica is a species of small sea snail, a marine gastropod mollusk in the family Cystiscidae, (previously placed in the family Marginellidae).

== Description ==
The shell size is 3 millimeters long, decorated with sandy yellows, browns, and whites. The opening is white, and the sides of the opening are ridged.

== Distribution ==
The species is endemic to São Tomé and Príncipe.
