= Scaptesylodes modica =

Scientific classification
- Kingdom: Animalia
- Phylum: Arthropoda
- Class: Insecta
- Order: Lepidoptera
- Family: Crambidae
- Genus: Scaptesylodes
- Species: S. modica

Binomial name
- Scaptesylodes modica Munroe, 1976

Species of moth

Scaptesylodes modica is a moth in the family Crambidae. It is found in Indonesia (Sumatra) and Malaysia.
