= Aneflomorpha modica =

Scientific classification
- Domain: Eukaryota
- Kingdom: Animalia
- Phylum: Arthropoda
- Class: Insecta
- Order: Coleoptera
- Suborder: Polyphaga
- Infraorder: Cucujiformia
- Family: Cerambycidae
- Genus: Aneflomorpha
- Species: A. modica

Binomial name
- Aneflomorpha modica Chemsak & Noguera, 2005

Species of beetle

Aneflomorpha modica is a species of beetle in the family Cerambycidae. It was described by Chemsak and Noguera in 2005.
