= Notata modicus =

Scientific classification
- Domain: Eukaryota
- Kingdom: Animalia
- Phylum: Arthropoda
- Class: Insecta
- Order: Lepidoptera
- Superfamily: Noctuoidea
- Family: Erebidae
- Subfamily: Arctiinae
- Genus: Notata
- Species: N. modicus

Binomial name
- Notata modicus (T. P. Lucas, 1892)

Synonyms
- Diphthraspis modica T. P. Lucas, 1892; Notata modica De Vos & Mastrigt, 2007

Species of moth

Notata modicus is a moth in the family Erebidae. It was described by Thomas Pennington Lucas in 1892. It is found in Queensland, Australia.
