= Waiporia modica =

Conservation status
- Data Deficit (NZ TCS)

Scientific classification
- Kingdom: Animalia
- Phylum: Arthropoda
- Subphylum: Chelicerata
- Class: Arachnida
- Order: Araneae
- Infraorder: Araneomorphae
- Family: Orsolobidae
- Genus: Waiporia
- Species: W. modica

Binomial name
- Waiporia modica (Forster, 1956)

Synonyms
- Ascuta modica

Species of spider

Waiporia modica is a species of Orsolobidae that is endemic to New Zealand.

== Taxonomy ==
This species was described as Ascuta mensa in 1956 by Ray Forster from a male specimen collected in Christchurch. In 1985, it was moved into the Waiporia genus and the female was described. The holotype is stored in Canterbury Museum.

== Description ==
The male is recorded at 2.13 mm in length whereas the female is 2.47 mm. This species has dark brown legs, dark orange brown carapace and a creamy white abdomen that has a chevron pattern dorsally.

== Distribution ==
This species is only known from Christchurch and Banks Peninsula in New Zealand.

== Conservation status ==
Under the New Zealand Threat Classification System, this species is listed as "Data Deficient" with the qualifiers of "Data Poor: Size" and "Data Poor: Trend".
