= Purakaunui (disambiguation) =

Purakaunui or Pūrākaunui may refer to the following in New Zealand:

- Pūrākaunui, a locality near Dunedin

- Pūrākaunui Inlet, a coastal feature close to Pūrākaunui

- Purakaunui, Clutha, a locality in Clutha District

- Purakaunui Falls, waterfalls near Purakaunui
- Purakaunui River, the river flowing over the Purakaunui Falls
