= Tangata pouaka =

Conservation status
- Data Deficit (NZ TCS)

Scientific classification
- Kingdom: Animalia
- Phylum: Arthropoda
- Subphylum: Chelicerata
- Class: Arachnida
- Order: Araneae
- Infraorder: Araneomorphae
- Family: Orsolobidae
- Genus: Tangata
- Species: T. pouaka

Binomial name
- Tangata pouaka Forster & Platnick, 1985

Species of spider

Tangata pouaka is a species of Orsolobidae that is endemic to New Zealand.

== Taxonomy ==
This species was described in 1985 by Ray Forster and Norman Platnick from female specimens collected in Taranaki. The holotype is stored in the New Zealand Arthropod Collection under registration number NZAC03015006.

== Description ==
The female is recorded at 2.92mm in length. The carapace and abdomen are patterned dorsally.

== Distribution ==
This species is only known from Pouakai Trig in Taranaki, New Zealand.

== Conservation status ==
Under the New Zealand Threat Classification System, this species is listed as "Data Deficient" with the qualifiers of "Data Poor: Size", "Data Poor: Trend" and "One Location".
