= Tangata orepukiensis =

Conservation status
- Data Deficit (NZ TCS)

Scientific classification
- Kingdom: Animalia
- Phylum: Arthropoda
- Subphylum: Chelicerata
- Class: Arachnida
- Order: Araneae
- Infraorder: Araneomorphae
- Family: Orsolobidae
- Genus: Tangata
- Species: T. orepukiensis

Binomial name
- Tangata orepukiensis (Forster, 1956)

Synonyms
- Ascuta orepukiensis

Species of spider

Tangata orepukiensis is a species of Orsolobidae. The species is endemic to New Zealand.

== Taxonomy ==
This species was described as Ascuta alpina in 1956 by Ray Forster from male and female specimens collected in Southland. It was moved to the Tangata genus in 1985. The holotype is stored in Canterbury Museum.

== Description ==
The male is recorded at 2.00mm in length whereas the female is 2.75mm. This species legs and carapace are coloured dark reddish brown. The abdomen has a chevron pattern dorsally.

== Distribution ==
This species is only known from Southland, New Zealand.

== Conservation status ==
Under the New Zealand Threat Classification System, this species is listed as "Data Deficient" with the qualifiers "Data Poor: Size" and "Data Poor: Trend".
