= Tangata nigra =

Conservation status
- Not Threatened (NZ TCS)

Scientific classification
- Kingdom: Animalia
- Phylum: Arthropoda
- Subphylum: Chelicerata
- Class: Arachnida
- Order: Araneae
- Infraorder: Araneomorphae
- Family: Orsolobidae
- Genus: Tangata
- Species: T. nigra

Binomial name
- Tangata nigra Forster & Platnick, 1985

Species of spider

Tangata nigra is a species of Orsolobidae. The species is endemic to New Zealand.

== Taxonomy ==
This species was described in 1985 by Ray Forster and Norman Platnick from male and female specimens collected in Haast. It is the type species for the Tangata. The holotype is stored in Otago Museum.

== Description ==
The male is recorded at 3.04mm in length whereas the female is 4.00mm. The abdomen is patterned dorsally.

== Distribution ==
This species is known from the south Westland region in New Zealand.

== Conservation status ==
Under the New Zealand Threat Classification System, this species is listed as "Not Threatened".
