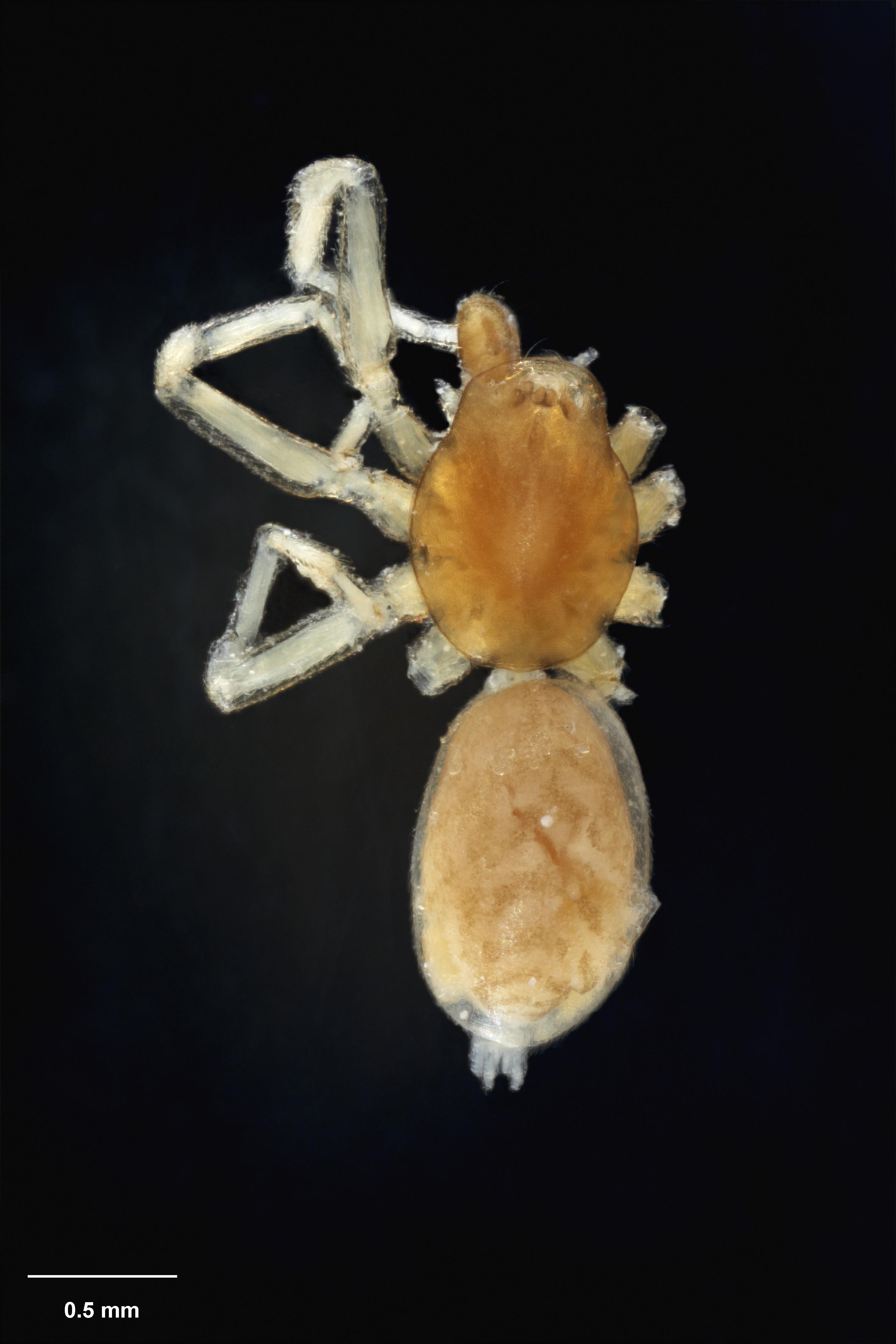

Conservation status
- Naturally Uncommon (NZ TCS)

Scientific classification
- Kingdom: Animalia
- Phylum: Arthropoda
- Subphylum: Chelicerata
- Class: Arachnida
- Order: Araneae
- Infraorder: Araneomorphae
- Family: Orsolobidae
- Genus: Tangata
- Species: T. plena

Binomial name
- Tangata plena (Forster, 1956)

Synonyms
- Ascuta plena

= Tangata plena =

Species of spider

Tangata plena is a species of Orsolobidae. The species is endemic to New Zealand.

== Taxonomy ==
This species was described as Ascuta plena in 1956 by Ray Forster from male specimens collected in Nelson. In 1985, It was moved to the Tangata genus and the female was described. The holotype is stored in Te Papa Museum under registration number AS.000088.

== Description ==
The male is recorded at 4.05mm in length whereas the female is 2.45mm. This species has pale reddish brown legs, a reddish brown carapace and creamy white abdomen with a faint chevron pattern dorsally.

== Distribution ==
This species is only known from Mount Arthur in Nelson, New Zealand.

== Conservation status ==
Under the New Zealand Threat Classification System, this species is listed as "Naturally Uncommon" with the qualifier "Range Restricted".
