= Tangata alpina =

Conservation status
- Data Deficient (NZ TCS)

Scientific classification
- Domain: Eukaryota
- Kingdom: Animalia
- Phylum: Arthropoda
- Subphylum: Chelicerata
- Class: Arachnida
- Order: Araneae
- Infraorder: Araneomorphae
- Family: Orsolobidae
- Genus: Tangata
- Species: T. alpina

Binomial name
- Tangata alpina (Forster, 1956)

Synonyms
- Ascuta alpina

Species of spider

Tangata alpina is a species of Orsolobidae. The species is endemic to New Zealand.

== Taxonomy ==
This species was described as Ascuta alpina in 1956 by Ray Forster from male and female specimens collected in Arthurs Pass. It was moved to the Tangata genus in 1985. The holotype is stored in Canterbury Museum.

== Description ==
The male is recorded as 2.09mm in length whereas the female is 2.62mm. This species has pale brown legs, dark reddish brown carapace and creamy white abdomen with a chevron pattern dorsally.

== Distribution ==
This species is only known from Arthurs Pass, New Zealand.

== Conservation status ==
Under the New Zealand Threat Classification System, this species is listed as "Data Deficient" with the qualifiers "Data Poor: Size" and "Data Poor: Trend".
