= Tautuku River =

River in New Zealand

Coordinates: 46°36′S 169°26′E

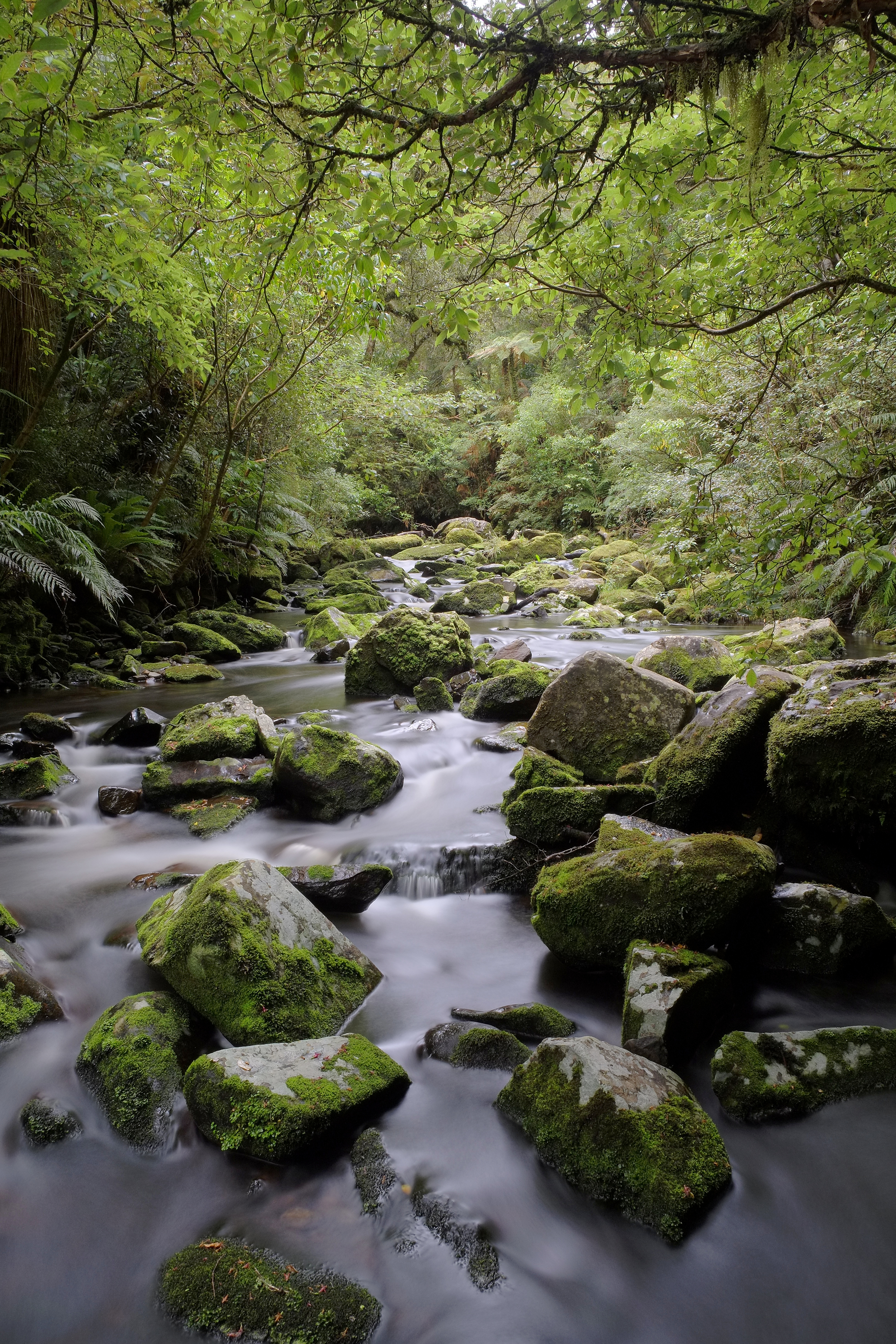
- Tautuku River south of McLean Falls

Location
- Country: New Zealand

Physical characteristics
- Source
  - location: Maclennan Range
- Mouth
  - location: Tautuku Bay (Pacific Ocean)
  - elevation: 0 metres (0 ft)

The Tautuku River originates in the Maclennan Range of The Catlins in New Zealand. It continues through native bush for almost its entire length, including McLean Falls. Near its mouth at Tautuku Bay, just north of Tautuku Peninsula, the river flows through the Tautuku Estuary, a breeding ground for fernbirds.

The river's lowermost stretch through the estuary can be used for kayaking.

== See also ==
- List of rivers of New Zealand
