= Tangata murihiku =

Conservation status
- Not Threatened (NZ TCS)

Scientific classification
- Kingdom: Animalia
- Phylum: Arthropoda
- Subphylum: Chelicerata
- Class: Arachnida
- Order: Araneae
- Infraorder: Araneomorphae
- Family: Orsolobidae
- Genus: Tangata
- Species: T. murihiku

Binomial name
- Tangata murihiku Forster & Platnick, 1985

Species of spider

Tangata murihiku is a species in the spider family Orsolobidae. The species is endemic to New Zealand.

== Taxonomy ==
This species was described in 1985 by Ray Forster and Norman Platnick from male and female specimens collected in Southland. The holotype is stored in Otago Museum.

== Description ==
The male is recorded at 2.22mm in length whereas the female is 2.36mm. The abdomen is patterned dorsally.

== Distribution ==
This species is only known from high rainfall areas in the south east of the South Island, New Zealand.

== Conservation status ==
Under the New Zealand Threat Classification System, this species is listed as "Not Threatened".
