= Tangata sylvester =

Conservation status
- Data Deficit (NZ TCS)

Scientific classification
- Kingdom: Animalia
- Phylum: Arthropoda
- Subphylum: Chelicerata
- Class: Arachnida
- Order: Araneae
- Infraorder: Araneomorphae
- Family: Orsolobidae
- Genus: Tangata
- Species: T. sylvester

Binomial name
- Tangata sylvester Forster & Platnick, 1985

Species of spider

Tangata sylvester is a species of Orsolobidae that is endemic to New Zealand.

== Taxonomy ==
This species was described in 1985 by Ray Forster and Norman Platnick from female specimens collected in Nelson. The holotype is stored in the New Zealand Arthropod Collection under registration number NZAC03015007.

== Description ==
The female is recorded at 4.52mm in length. The abdomen is patterned dorsally.

== Distribution ==
This species is only known from the Nelson region of New Zealand.

== Conservation status ==
Under the New Zealand Threat Classification System, this species is listed as "Data Deficient" with the qualifiers of "Data Poor: Size" and "Data Poor: Trend".
