= McLean Falls =

Coordinates: 46.569608°S 169.352150°E

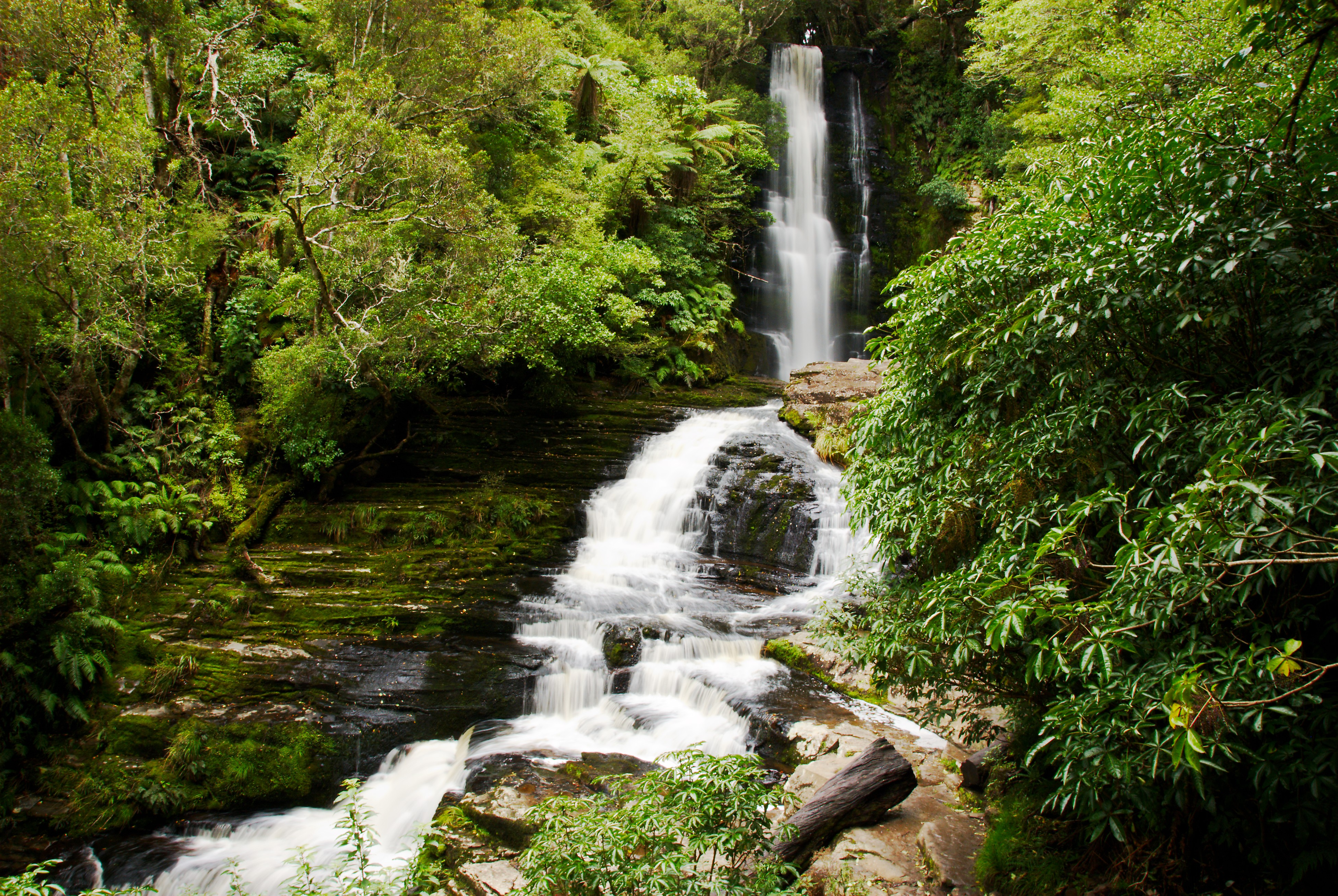
- McLean Falls, April 2008
- Interactive map of McLean Falls
- Location: The Catlins, Otago region, New Zealand
- Type: Cascade
- Total height: 22 metres (72 ft)
- Watercourse: Tautuku River

The McLean Falls on the Tautuku River in Catlins Forest Park descend a number of steep drop offs and terraces, with the very top of the waterfall, where it meets its first waterpool being 22-metres. It then descends for many more metres over a series of terraces. The McLean Falls are often described as the most spectacular in the region. However, its sister waterfall Purakaunui Falls is more visited, due to it being more easily accessible.

The entrance to the McLean Falls River Walk is three kilometres from the Southern Scenic Route on Rewcastle Road. The track from the road to the falls passes through a variety of native forest and shrub types: rimu, kāmahi, divaricating shrubland, huge tree fuchsia, stands of olearia and podocarp forest.

A footbridge then crosses the subsidiary, Duckaday Creek, named by the early settler, Doug McLean, who used to bathe in it from time to time. The walk follows an easy grade along the Tautuku River valley with views of the river and bush. The path, including boardwalks and footbridges, is maintained by the Department of Conservation and is regularly gravelled.

== See also ==
- List of waterfalls
- List of waterfalls in New Zealand
