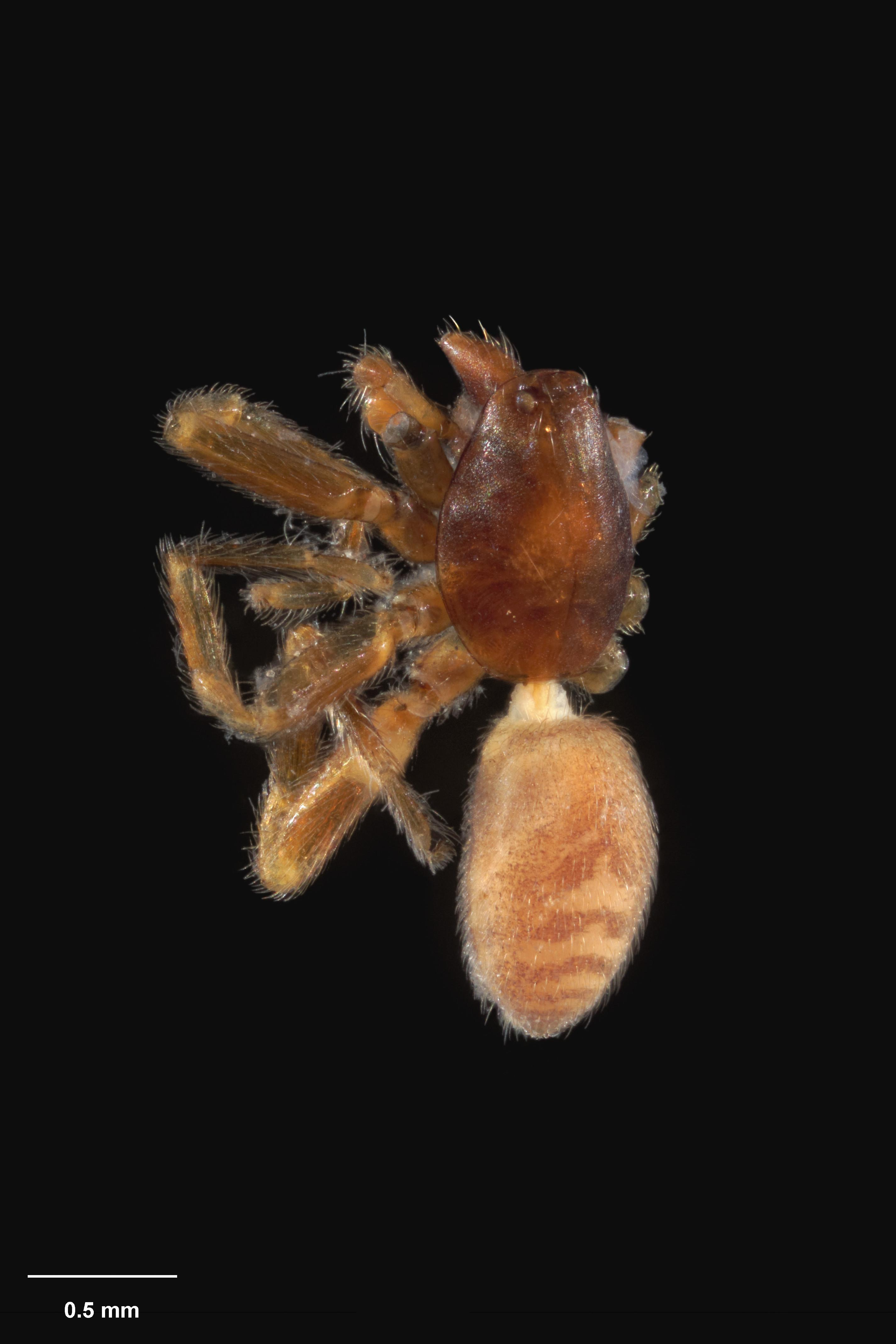
- Tangata rakiura

Scientific classification
- Kingdom: Animalia
- Phylum: Arthropoda
- Subphylum: Chelicerata
- Class: Arachnida
- Order: Araneae
- Infraorder: Araneomorphae
- Family: Orsolobidae
- Genus: Tangata; Forster & Platnick, 1985

Type species
- T. nigra Forster & Platnick, 1985

Species
- 17, see text

= Tangata (spider) =

Genus of spiders

Tangata is a genus of Polynesian araneomorph spiders in the family Orsolobidae, and was first described by Raymond Robert Forster & Norman I. Platnick in 1985.

== Species ==
As of June 2019 it contains seventeen species, found only in New Zealand:

- Tangata alpina (Forster, 1956) – New Zealand
- Tangata furcata Forster & Platnick, 1985 – New Zealand
- Tangata horningi Forster & Platnick, 1985 – New Zealand
- Tangata kohuka Forster & Platnick, 1985 – New Zealand
- Tangata murihiku Forster & Platnick, 1985 – New Zealand
- Tangata nigra Forster & Platnick, 1985 (type) – New Zealand
- Tangata orepukiensis (Forster, 1956) – New Zealand
- Tangata otago Forster & Platnick, 1985 – New Zealand
- Tangata parafurcata Forster & Platnick, 1985 – New Zealand
- Tangata plena (Forster, 1956) – New Zealand
- Tangata pouaka Forster & Platnick, 1985 – New Zealand
- Tangata rakiura (Forster, 1956) – New Zealand
- Tangata stewartensis (Forster, 1956) – New Zealand
- Tangata sylvester Forster & Platnick, 1985 – New Zealand
- Tangata tautuku Forster & Platnick, 1985 – New Zealand
- Tangata townsendi Forster & Platnick, 1985 – New Zealand
- Tangata waipoua Forster & Platnick, 1985 – New Zealand
