= Tangata waipoua =

Conservation status
- Not Threatened (NZ TCS)

Scientific classification
- Kingdom: Animalia
- Phylum: Arthropoda
- Subphylum: Chelicerata
- Class: Arachnida
- Order: Araneae
- Infraorder: Araneomorphae
- Family: Orsolobidae
- Genus: Tangata
- Species: T. waipoua

Binomial name
- Tangata waipoua Forster & Platnick, 1985

Species of spider

Tangata waipoua is a species of Orsolobidae that is endemic to New Zealand.

== Taxonomy ==
This species was described in 1985 by Ray Forster and Norman Platnick from female specimens collected in Northland. The holotype is stored in the New Zealand Arthropod Collection under registration number NZAC03015009.

== Description ==
The female is recorded at 2.48mm in length. The abdomen is patterned dorsally.

== Distribution ==
This species is only known from Northland, New Zealand.

== Conservation status ==
Under the New Zealand Threat Classification System, this species is listed as "Not Threatened".
