= Tangata stewartensis =

Conservation status
- Data Deficit (NZ TCS)

Scientific classification
- Kingdom: Animalia
- Phylum: Arthropoda
- Subphylum: Chelicerata
- Class: Arachnida
- Order: Araneae
- Infraorder: Araneomorphae
- Family: Orsolobidae
- Genus: Tangata
- Species: T. stewartensis

Binomial name
- Tangata stewartensis (Forster, 1956)

Synonyms
- Ascuta stewartensis

Species of spider

Tangata stewartensis is a species of Orsolobidae that is endemic to New Zealand.

== Taxonomy ==
This species was described as Ascuta plena in 1956 by Ray Forster from male and female specimens collected in Stewart Island. In 1985, it was moved into the Tangata genus. The holotype is stored in Canterbury Museum.

== Description ==
The male is recorded at 2.03mm in length whereas the female is 2.74mm. This species has orange brown legs, a dark orange brown carapace and the abdomen has chevron marking dorsally.

== Distribution ==
This species is only known from Halfmoon Bay in Stewart Island, New Zealand.

== Conservation status ==
Under the New Zealand Threat Classification System, this species is listed as "Data Deficient" with the qualifiers of "Data Poor: Size", "Data Poor: Trend" and "One Location".
