= Tangata furcata =

Conservation status
- Not Threatened (NZ TCS)

Scientific classification
- Kingdom: Animalia
- Phylum: Arthropoda
- Subphylum: Chelicerata
- Class: Arachnida
- Order: Araneae
- Infraorder: Araneomorphae
- Family: Orsolobidae
- Genus: Tangata
- Species: T. furcata

Binomial name
- Tangata furcata Forster & Platnick, 1985

Species of spider

Tangata furcata is a species of Orsolobidae. The species is endemic to New Zealand.

== Taxonomy ==
This species was described in 1985 by Ray Forster and Norman Platnick from male and female specimens collected in Dunedin. The holotype is stored in Otago Museum.

== Description ==
The male is recorded at 2.32mm in length whereas the female is 3.12mm. This species has a shaded carapace along margins whilst the abdomen is patterned dorsally.

== Distribution ==
This species is known from central and northern Otago, New Zealand. It has been recorded at altitudes from sea level to just over 1000m. It has also been collected in subalpine tussock and several forest types.

== Conservation status ==
Under the New Zealand Threat Classification System, this species is listed as "Not Threatened".
