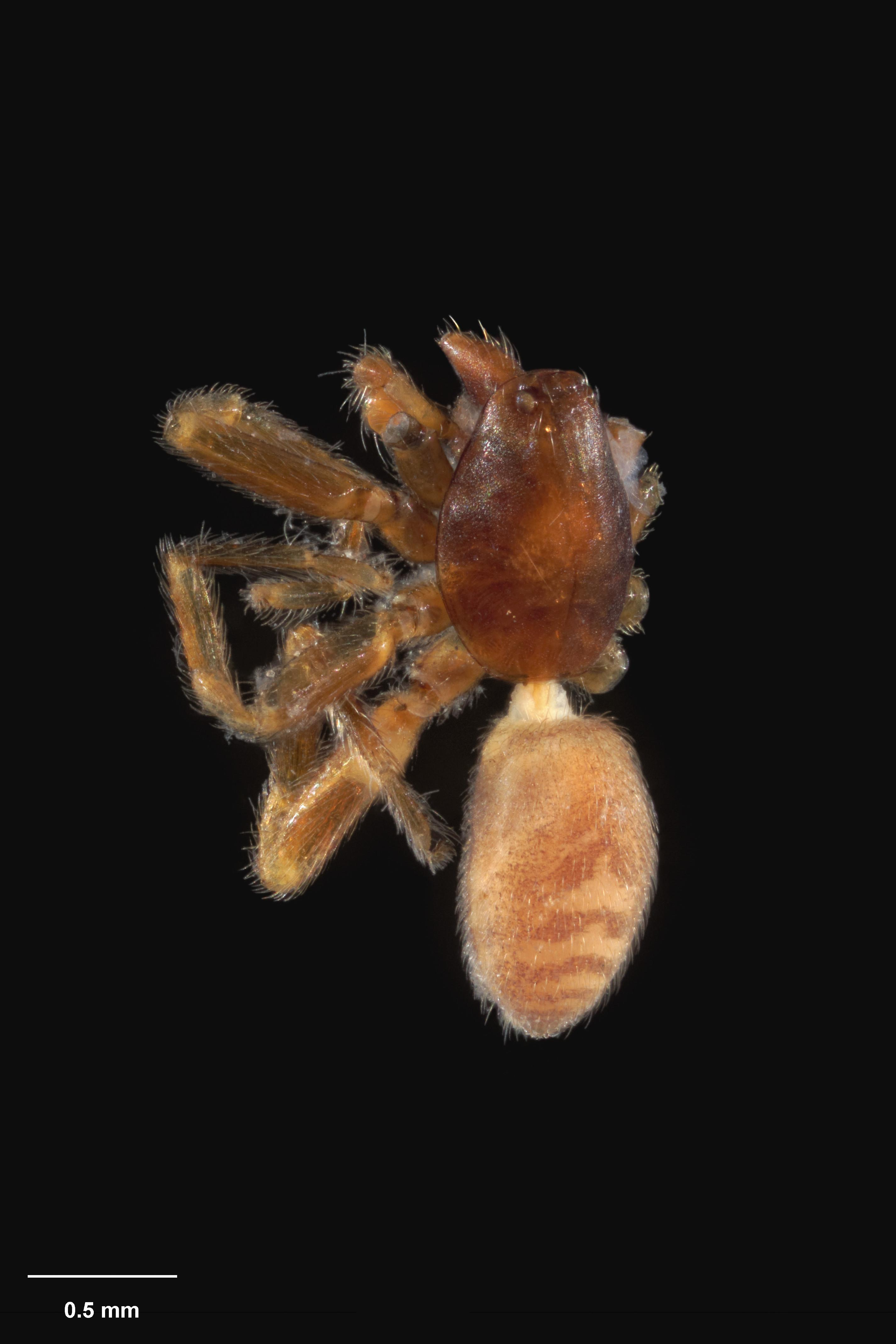

Conservation status
- Data Deficient (NZ TCS)

Scientific classification
- Domain: Eukaryota
- Kingdom: Animalia
- Phylum: Arthropoda
- Subphylum: Chelicerata
- Class: Arachnida
- Order: Araneae
- Infraorder: Araneomorphae
- Family: Orsolobidae
- Genus: Tangata
- Species: T. rakiura

Binomial name
- Tangata rakiura (Forster, 1956)

Synonyms
- Ascuta rakiura Forster, 1956

= Tangata rakiura =

Species of spider

Tangata rakiura is a species of araneomorph spider of the genus Tangata. The species is endemic to New Zealand

== Taxonomy ==
This species was first described from a single male by Ray Forster in 1956 and originally was named Ascuta rakiura. It was transferred to the Tangata genus in 1985. The holotype specimen was collected by Richard Dell and Beverley Holloway at Easy Cove on Stewart Island, during the 1955 Dominion Museum expedition. An additional female specimen was collected from Big South Cape Island in 1969.

The holotype is stored at Te Papa Museum under registration number AS.000095.

== Description ==
The body of the male is around 1.6mm in length. The carapace and legs are uniform orange brown. The abdomen is whitish with six chevron patterns on the dorsal surface. The female is around 2.4mm in length.

== Distribution ==
This species is only known from Easy Cove on Stewart Island and Big South Cape Island in New Zealand.

== Conservation status ==
Under the New Zealand Threat Classification System, this species is listed as Data Deficient with the qualifiers of "Data Poor: Size" and "Data Poor: Trend".
