= Tautuku Peninsula =

Peninsula in Otago, New Zealand

Coordinates: 46.604°S 169.436°E

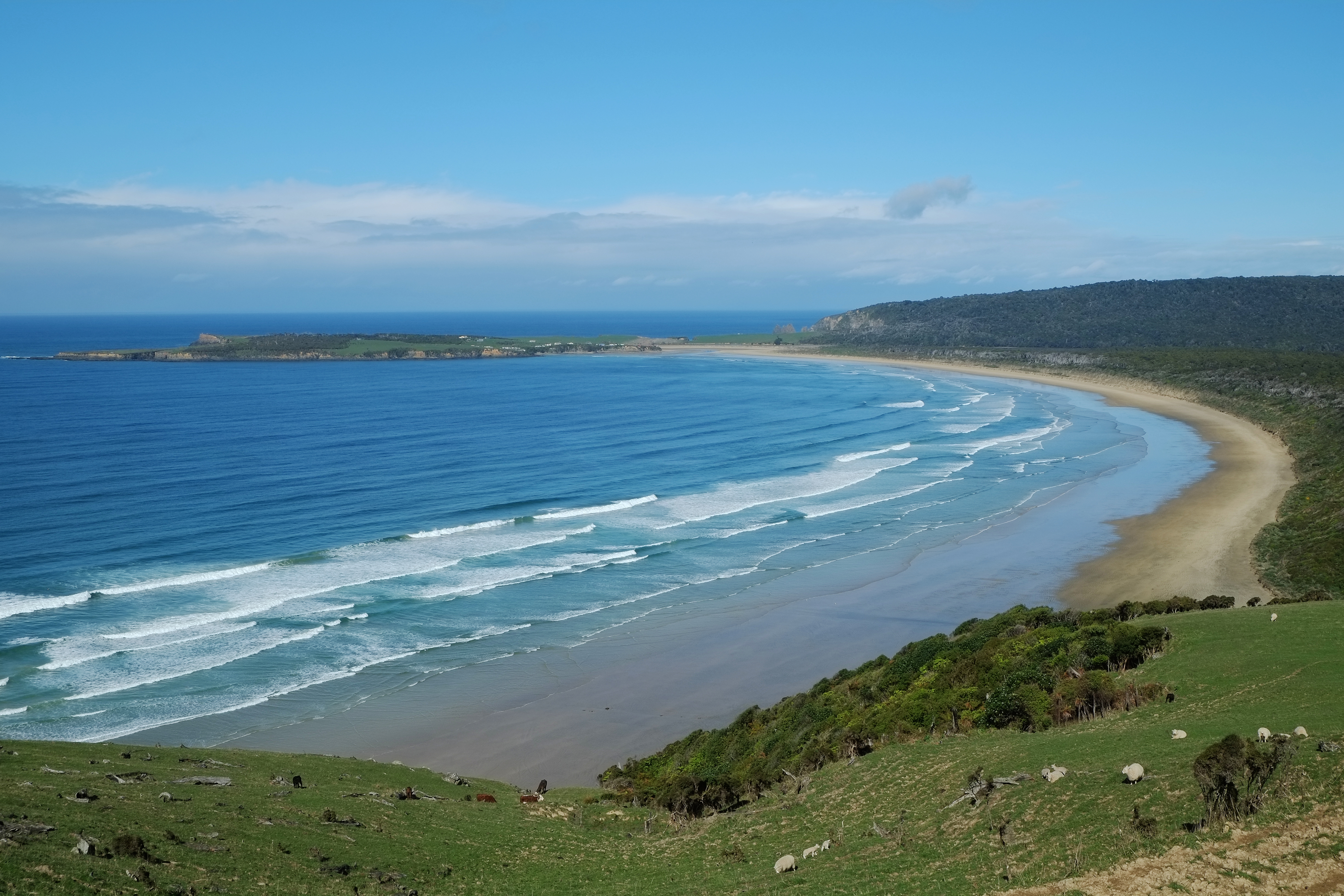
View from Florence Hill lookout across Tautuku Bay to the Tautuku Peninsula

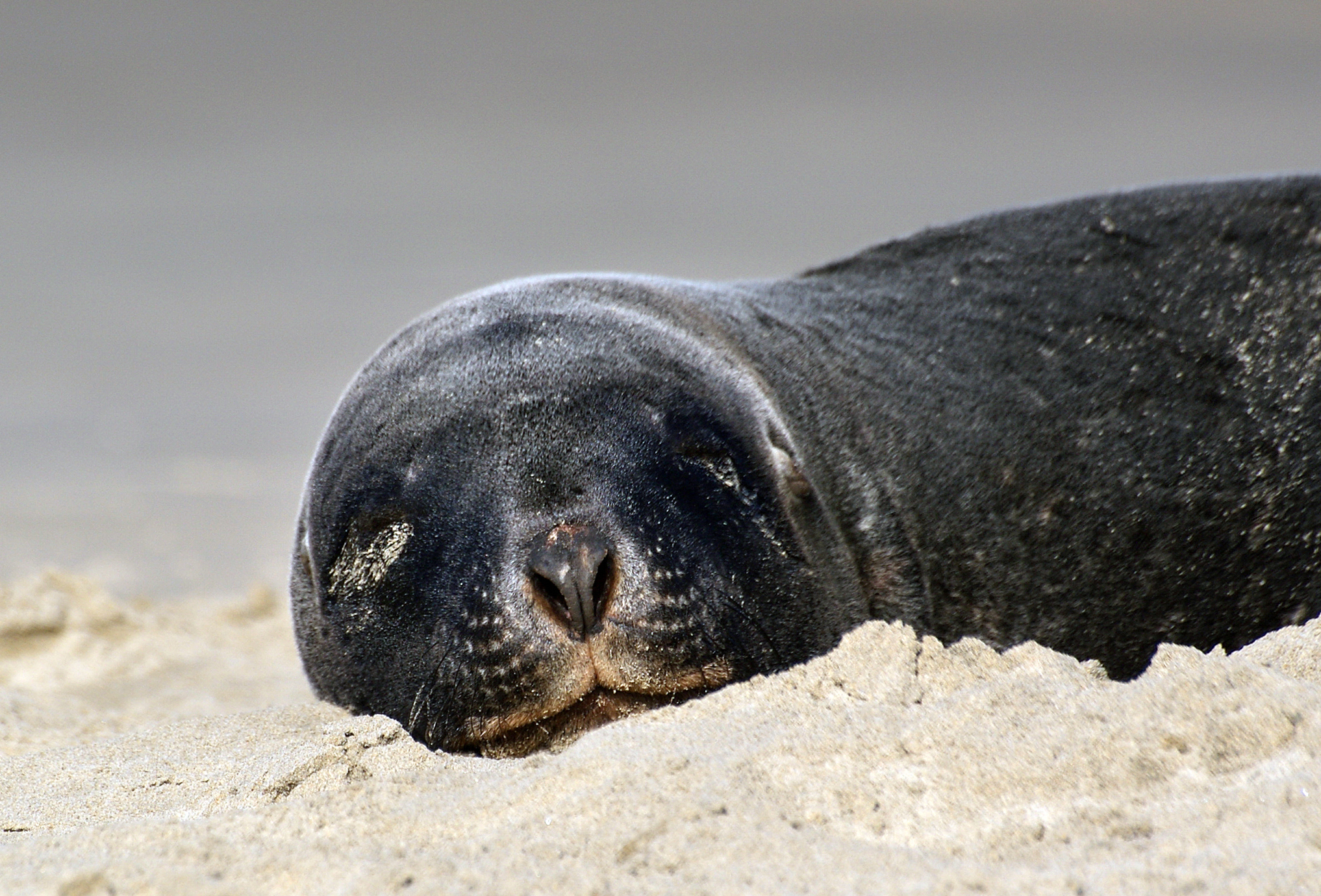
Hooker's Sea Lion at the Tautuku Peninsula

Tautuku Peninsula is a rocky headland in the Catlins on the south coast of Otago on the South Island of New Zealand. It is located 25 km (15 mi) east of Waikawa, at the western end of Tautuku Bay.

From 1839 to 1846, a whaling station was sited near the peninsula's neck, and a port was later developed for the fishing, flax and timber industries. When these industries declined, the port was closed. Today, southern right whales are making slow come back and still can be seen around the peninsula occasionally. New Zealand sea lions and yellow-eyed penguins (hoiho) also can be seen on beaches. Sporadic mammal visitors include leopard seals.

The estuary of the Tautuku River, just north of the peninsula, is inhabited by fernbirds. A short walk leads from Outdoor Education Centre next to the Southern Scenic Route through this jointed rush wetland, partly as a boardwalk.

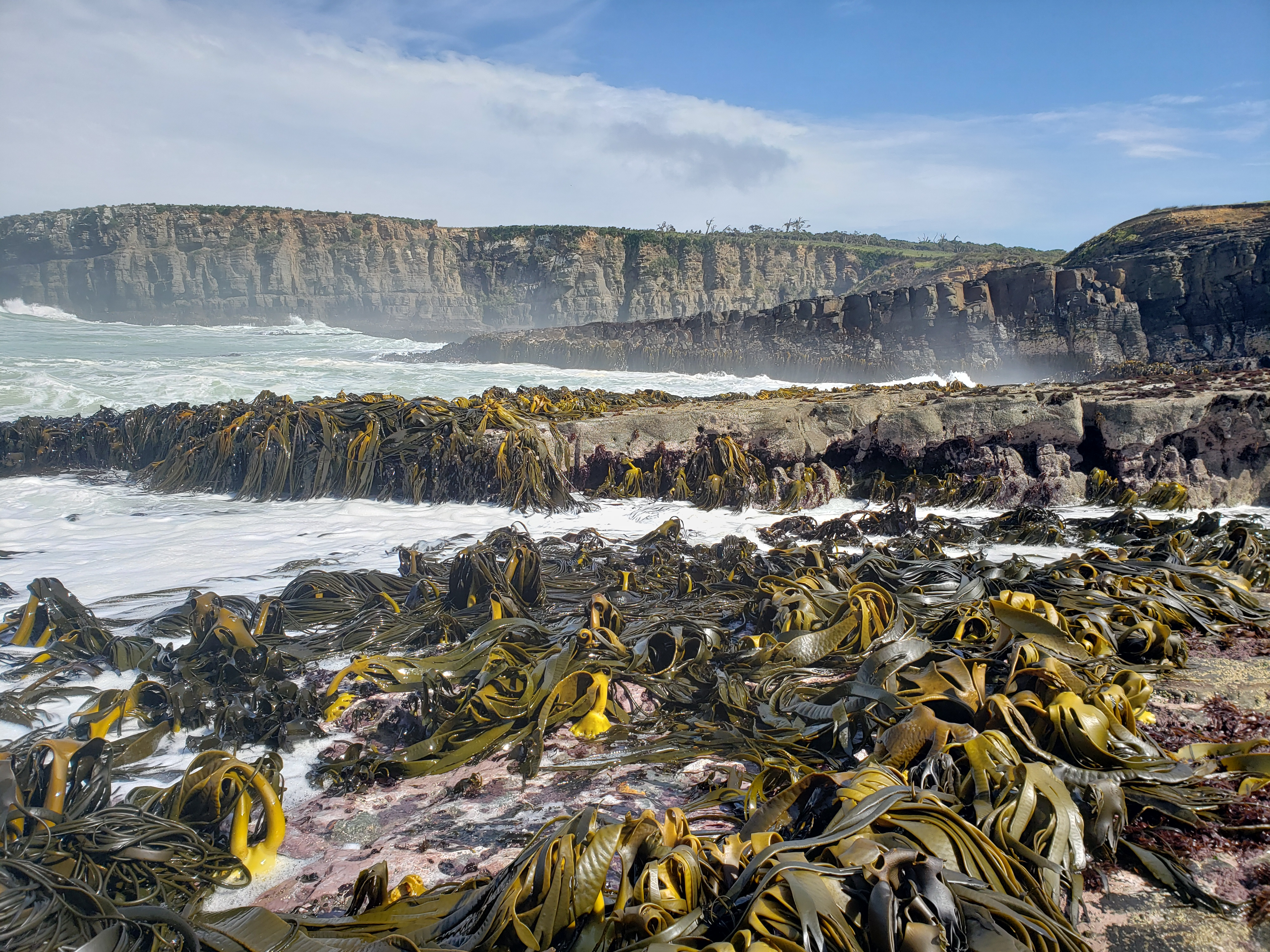
Durvillaea bull kelp on the Tautuku Peninsula

There are numerous cribs (holiday cottages) on the peninsula, but these are mainly reached by four-wheel drive or tractor, as no roads reach the peninsula. The only access is via the mouth of the Fleming River, or along Tautuku Beach. A signposted lookout on the side of the Southern Scenic Route road on Florence Hill offers a scenic view south over Tautuku Bay and the Tautuku Peninsula.

== Climate ==
Climate data for Tautuku (1991–2020 normals, extremes 1976–present)
Month	Jan	Feb	Mar	Apr	May	Jun	Jul	Aug	Sep	Oct	Nov	Dec	Year
Record high °C (°F)	33.0 (91.4)	34.0 (93.2)	31.0 (87.8)	26.0 (78.8)	27.0 (80.6)	18.7 (65.7)	23.5 (74.3)	21.0 (69.8)	25.6 (78.1)	28.5 (83.3)	28.0 (82.4)	29.5 (85.1)	34.0 (93.2)
Mean maximum °C (°F)	27.5 (81.5)	27.1 (80.8)	25.2 (77.4)	22.1 (71.8)	19.5 (67.1)	15.6 (60.1)	15.3 (59.5)	17.2 (63.0)	20.3 (68.5)	22.8 (73.0)	24.3 (75.7)	26.4 (79.5)	29.3 (84.7)
Mean daily maximum °C (°F)	18.7 (65.7)	18.5 (65.3)	17.3 (63.1)	15.2 (59.4)	12.9 (55.2)	10.5 (50.9)	10.2 (50.4)	11.3 (52.3)	13.2 (55.8)	14.7 (58.5)	15.8 (60.4)	18.0 (64.4)	14.7 (58.4)
Daily mean °C (°F)	14.1 (57.4)	14.0 (57.2)	12.8 (55.0)	11.0 (51.8)	9.1 (48.4)	6.9 (44.4)	6.4 (43.5)	7.3 (45.1)	8.7 (47.7)	10.1 (50.2)	11.2 (52.2)	13.1 (55.6)	10.4 (50.7)
Mean daily minimum °C (°F)	9.5 (49.1)	9.5 (49.1)	8.3 (46.9)	6.8 (44.2)	5.2 (41.4)	3.4 (38.1)	2.6 (36.7)	3.3 (37.9)	4.2 (39.6)	5.4 (41.7)	6.7 (44.1)	8.3 (46.9)	6.1 (43.0)
Mean minimum °C (°F)	4.8 (40.6)	4.7 (40.5)	3.9 (39.0)	1.5 (34.7)	0.2 (32.4)	−1.3 (29.7)	−1.9 (28.6)	−1.1 (30.0)	−0.1 (31.8)	0.8 (33.4)	1.9 (35.4)	3.8 (38.8)	−2.6 (27.3)
Record low °C (°F)	2.5 (36.5)	3.0 (37.4)	1.5 (34.7)	−0.5 (31.1)	−5.0 (23.0)	−7.5 (18.5)	−4.3 (24.3)	−3.5 (25.7)	−3.0 (26.6)	−1.5 (29.3)	0.0 (32.0)	0.0 (32.0)	−7.5 (18.5)
Average rainfall mm (inches)	106.1 (4.18)	91.3 (3.59)	90.4 (3.56)	101.3 (3.99)	127.0 (5.00)	119.5 (4.70)	97.2 (3.83)	96.5 (3.80)	97.8 (3.85)	113.2 (4.46)	113.9 (4.48)	101.6 (4.00)	1,255.8 (49.44)
Source: NIWA
