= Purakaunui River =

Coordinates: 46°33′S 169°37′E

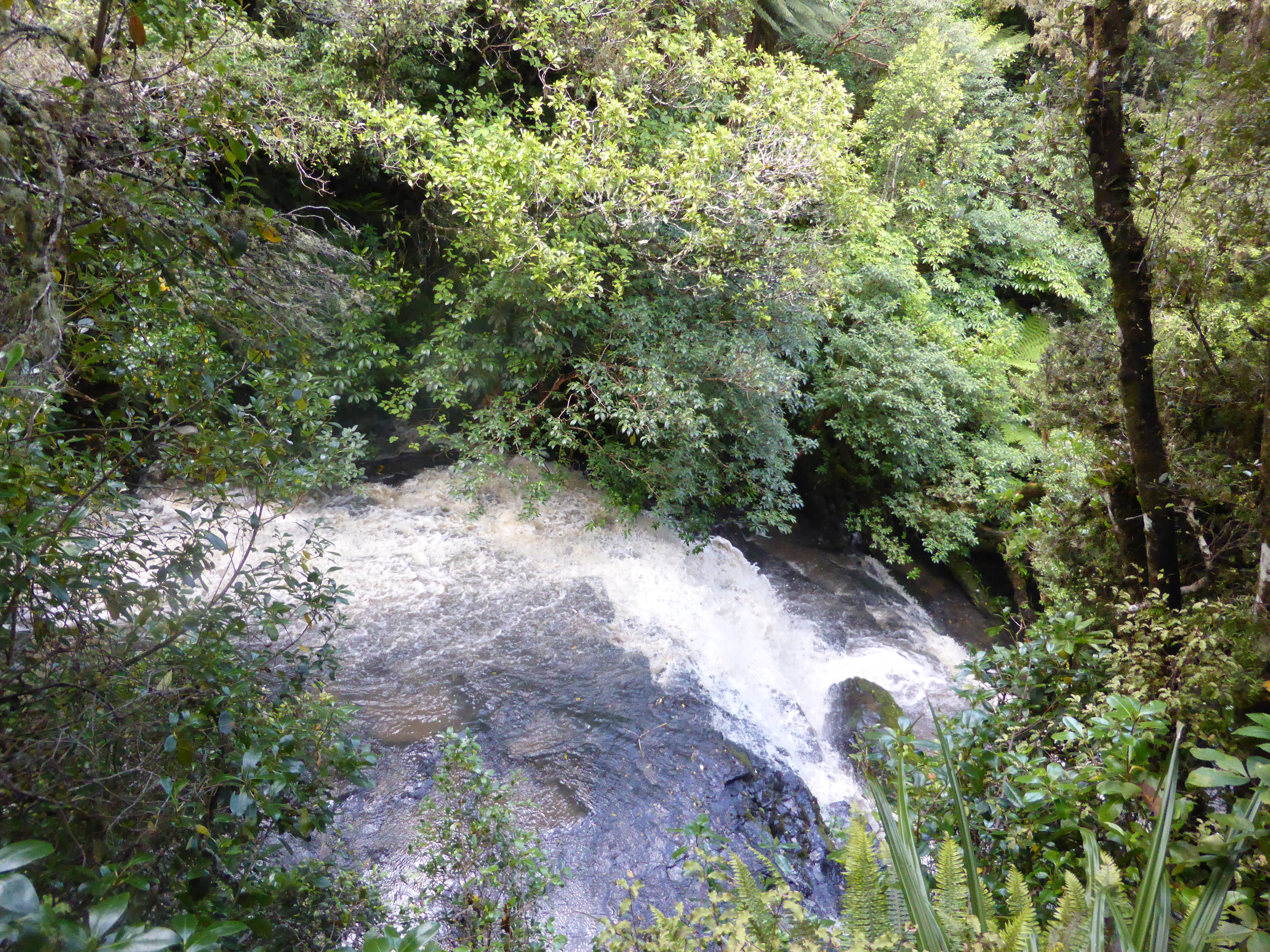
- Purakaunui River at the top of the waterfall

Location
- Country: New Zealand

The Purakaunui River is a river in the western Catlins, New Zealand. It rises west of Houipapa and flows through the Pūrākaunui Bay Scenic Reserve into the Pacific Ocean at Pūrākaunui Bay. The river is best known for Purakaunui Falls.

== See also ==
- List of rivers of New Zealand
