= Purakaunui Falls =

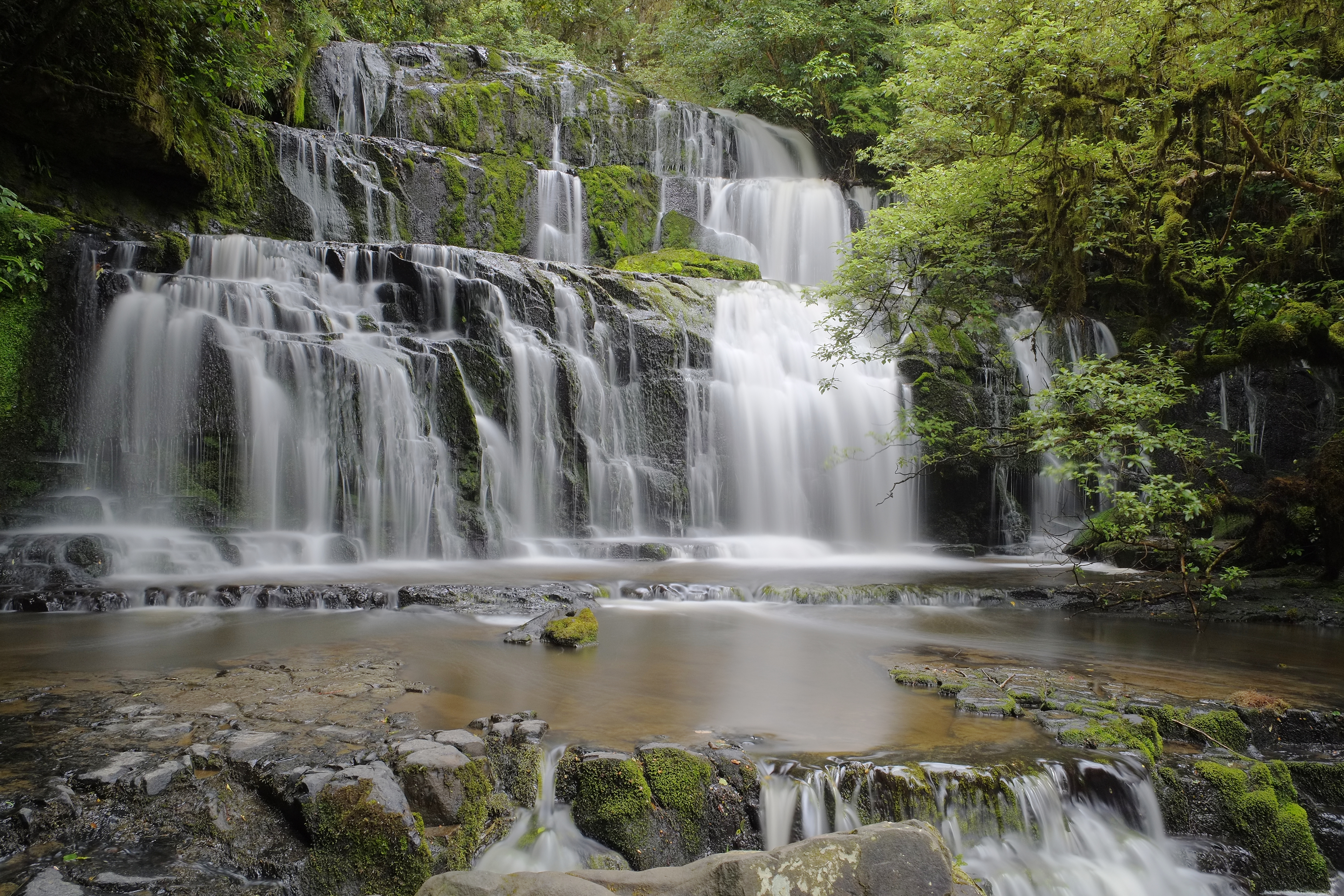
- Purakaunui Falls
- Interactive map of Purakaunui Falls
- Location: The Catlins, South Island
- Coordinates: 46°31′13.46″S 169°33′47.56″E
- Type: Cascade
- Total height: 20 metres (66 ft)
- Watercourse: Purakaunui River

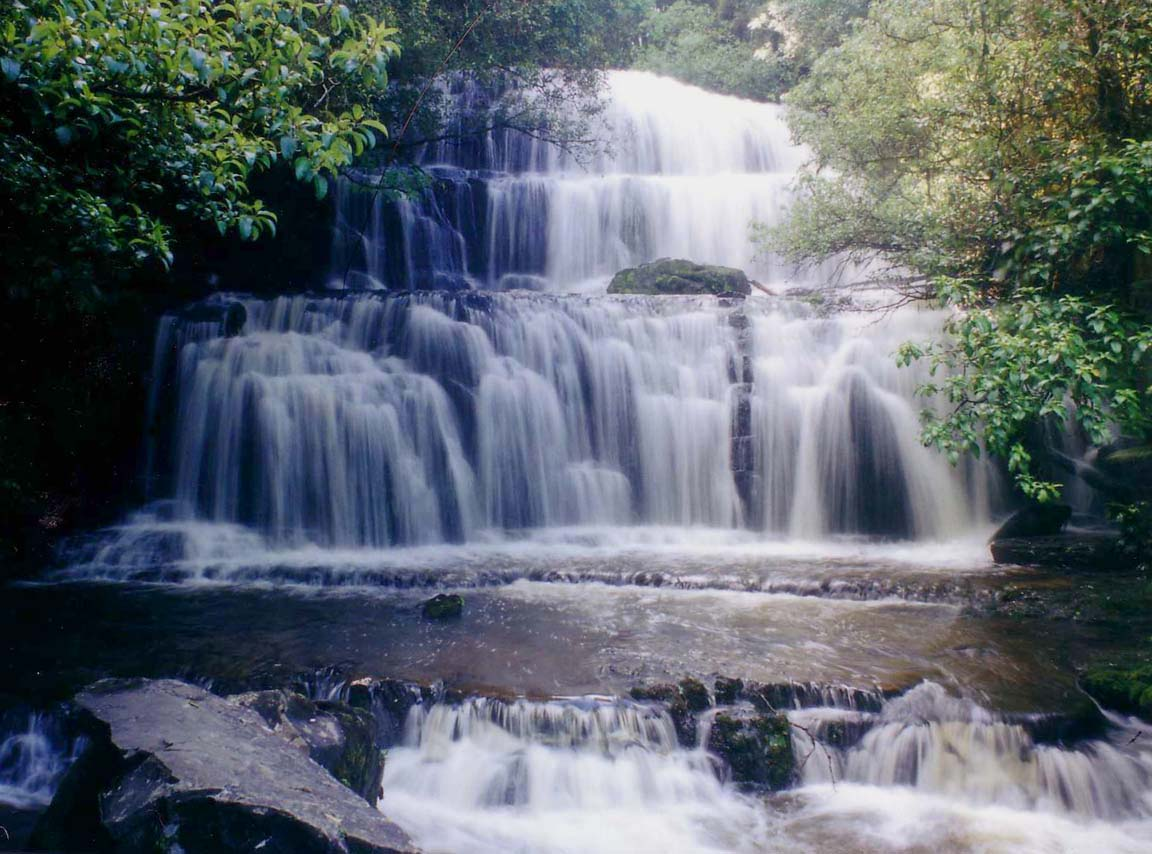
Purakaunui Falls in full flow

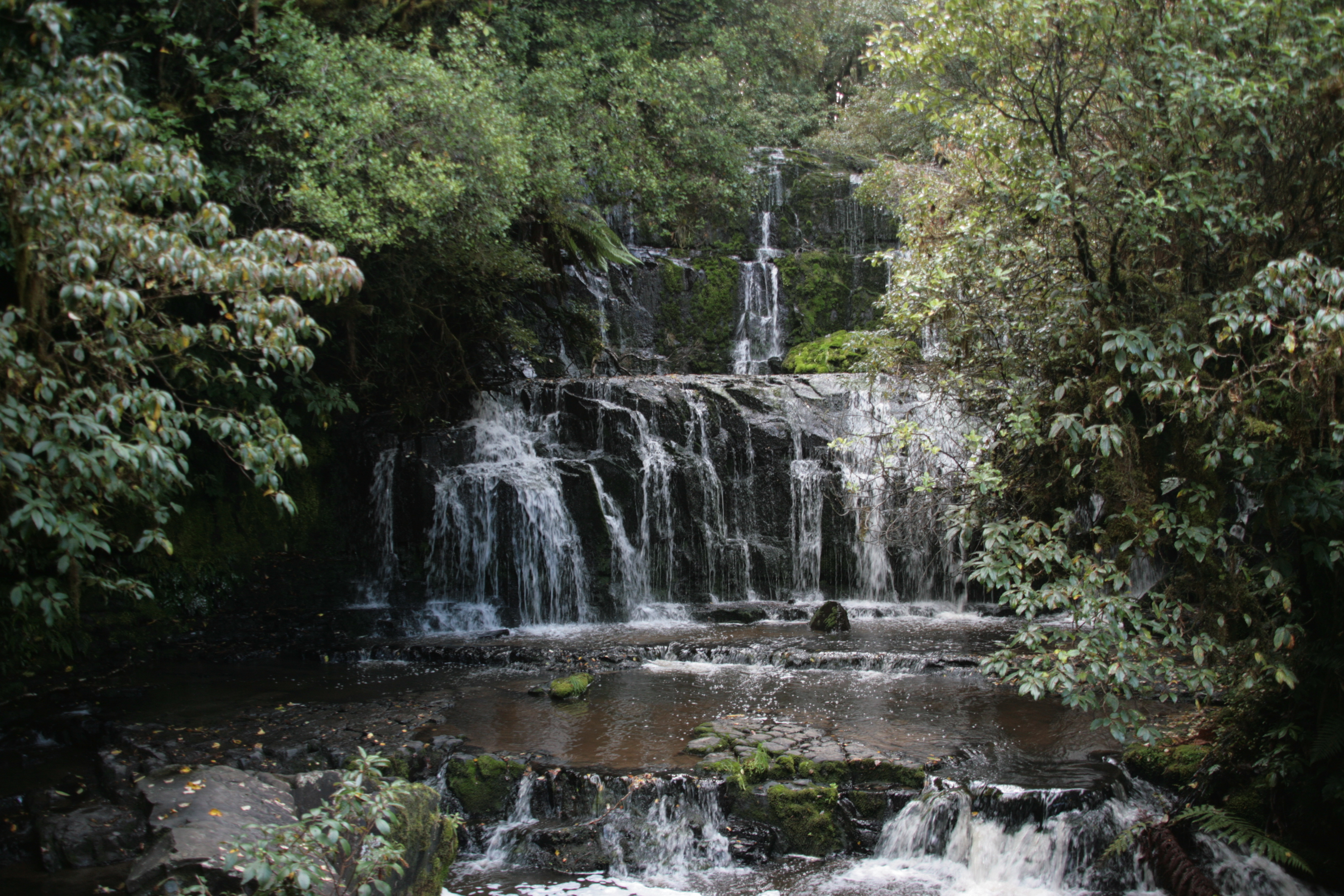
The falls in a drier period

The Purakaunui Falls are a cascading three-tiered waterfall on the Purakaunui River, in The Catlins of the southern South Island of New Zealand. As one of very few South Island waterfalls away from the alpine region, it has long been a popular destination and photographic subject.

The falls are an iconic image for The Catlins region, and were featured on a New Zealand postage stamp in 1976.

== Location ==
The falls are located 17 km (11 mi) to the southwest of the small town of Owaka and 5 kilometres (3 mi) from the river's outflow into the Pacific Ocean. They can be reached via a short 10-minute bush walk from a car park on the Waikoato Valley / Purakaunui Falls Road, a gravel side-road off the main Owaka-Invercargill road. There are toilets and a picnic area. The small, well-signposted detour to the falls is popular with tourist travellers along the Southern Scenic Route, and prominently mentioned in brochures about the area.

Although the Purakaunui Falls are not part of the Catlins Conservation Park, they are surrounded by native bush consisting of podocarp and silver beech, in a scenic reserve of 5 square kilometres (2 sq mi). A small viewing platform near the top of the falls is accessible by wheelchair. Steps continue down to the main viewing platform at the base of the 20 metres (66 ft) three tiered cascade.

== See also ==
- List of waterfalls
- List of waterfalls in New Zealand
- McLean Falls
