= Cavalcade =

Procession on horseback, or a mass trail ride by a company of riders

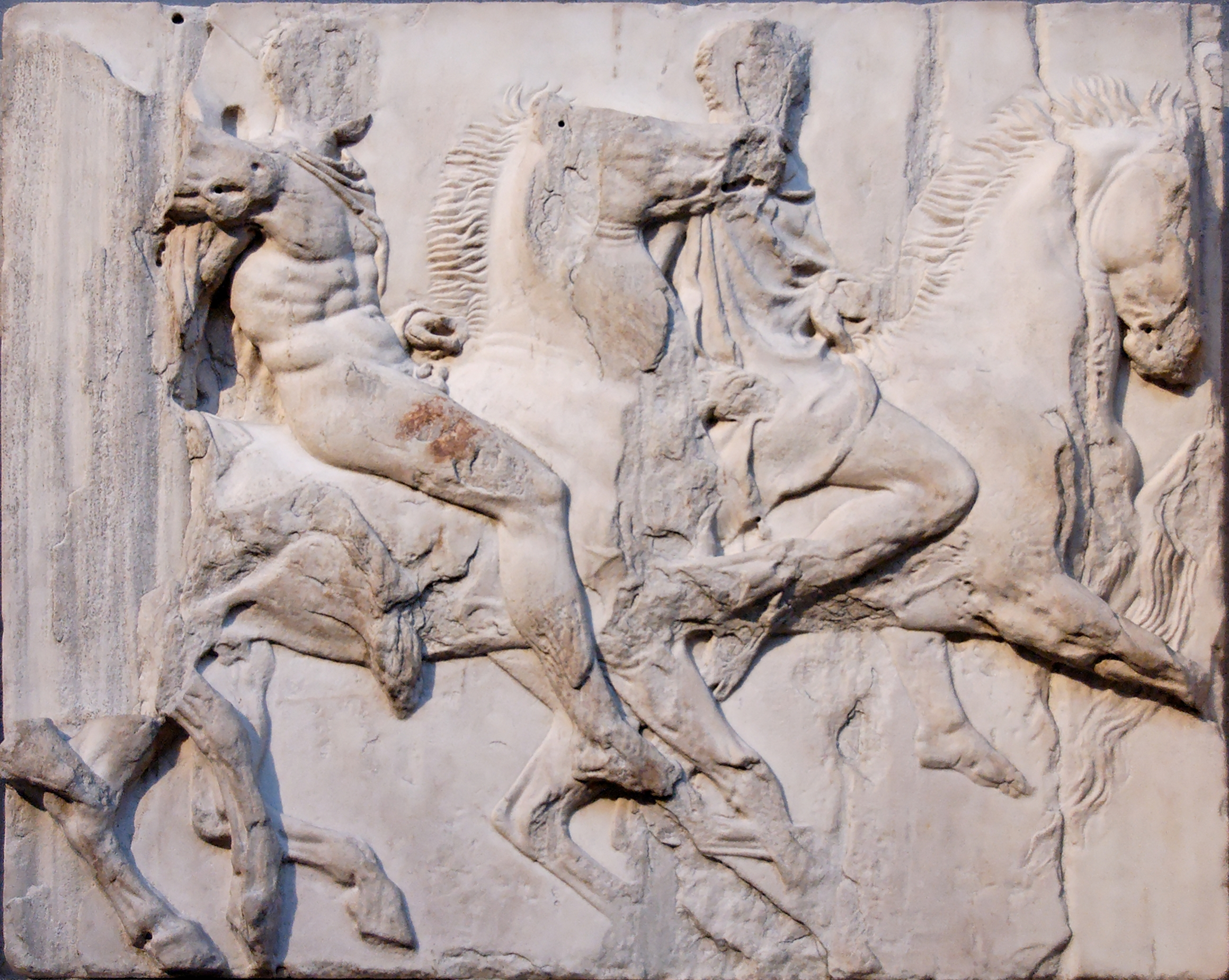
Cavalcade. Block VII from the south frieze of the Parthenon, ca. 447–433 BC. (British Museum)

A cavalcade is a procession or parade on horseback, or a mass distance ride by a company of riders.

Sometimes the focus of a cavalcade is participation rather than display and the participants do not wear costumes or ride in formation. Sometimes, a modern cavalcade re-enacts an important historical event and follows a long-distance trail. A cavalcade may also be a pilgrimage.

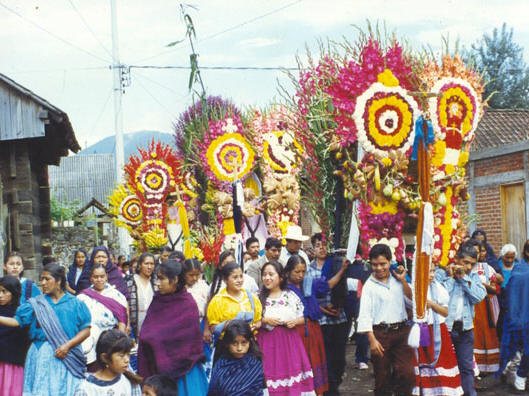
Ceremonial entry into or departure from a town

Many cavalcades involve ceremonial entries into and departures from towns and villages. Long-distance cavalcades may acquire more riders who join from populated places along its route.

A modern variant is a ceremonial entry to an event, called the "grand entry.” Such processions are traditional in many rodeos and powwows in the American West.

The term cavalcade comes from the classical Latin word caballus, used to describe a strong work horse. This developed into the word caballicare, "to ride horseback," which in Italian became cavalcare. In Spanish the term for cavalcade is cabalgata.

== North America ==
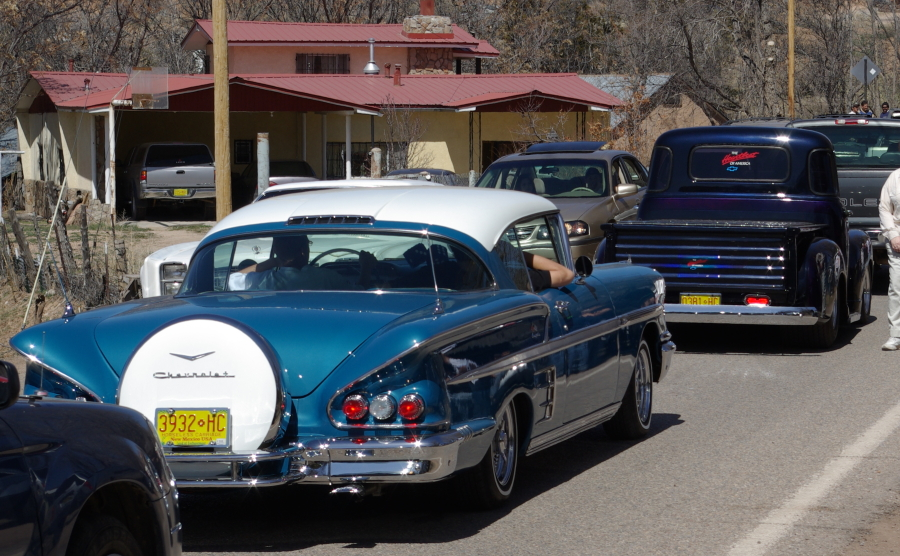
Automobile cavalcade to El Santuario de Chimayó

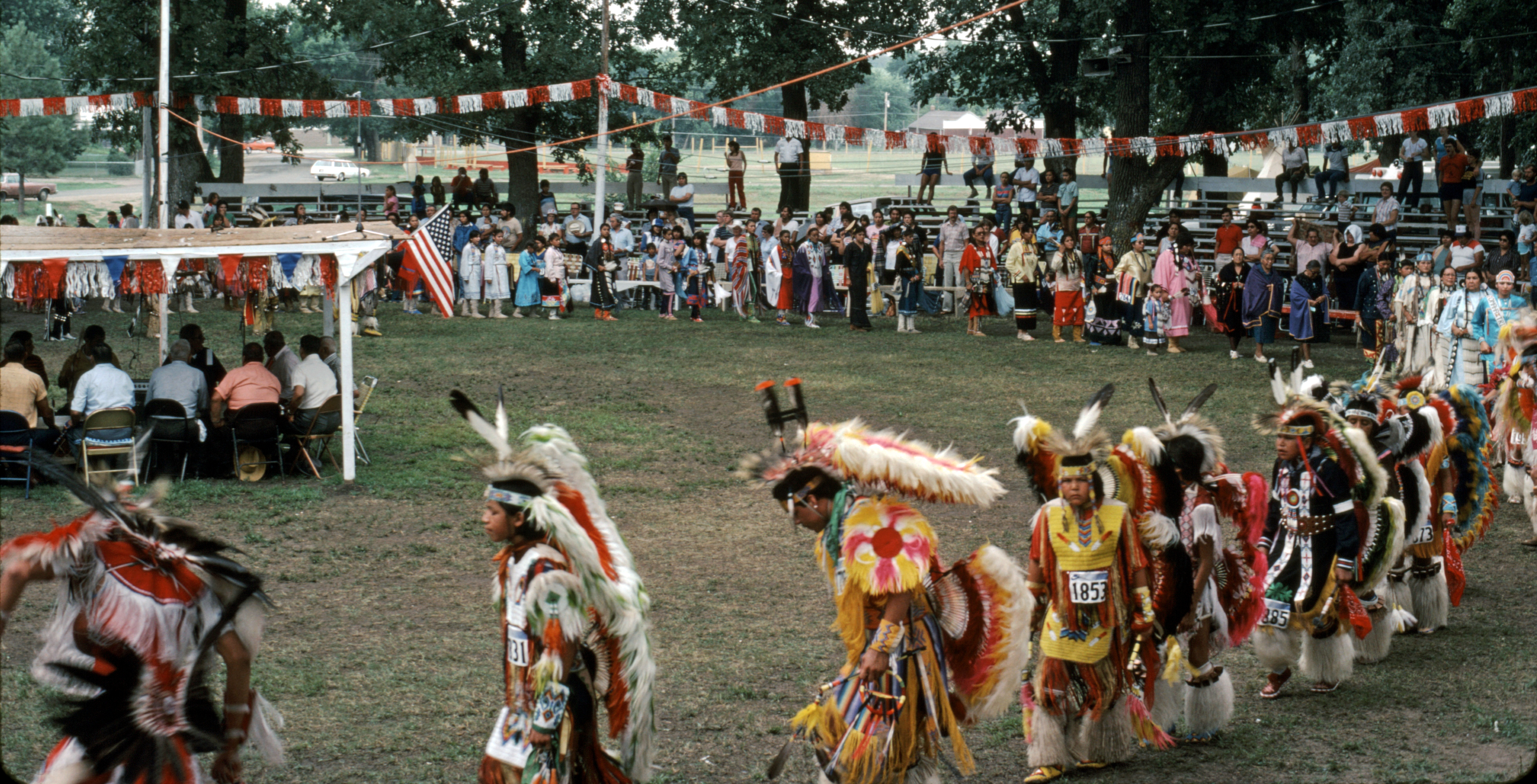
Grand Entry at a Native American Pow-Wow

In New Mexico, Philmont Scout Ranch includes a week-long cavalcade among its programs. The annual pilgrimage to El Santuario de Chimayó includes a cavalcade of classic cars on Good Friday. Traditionally, the pilgrimage had been made on foot. Today, in addition to traveling by car and foot, a few pilgrims ride horses. Columbus, New Mexico is the end point of the annual Cabalgata Binacional Villista (see #Chihuahua).

In the western United States, certain ceremonial long-distance rides on horseback, sometimes driving cattle, resemble cavalcades. Once example occurs in conjunction with the Houston Livestock Show and Rodeo. Another, among the oldest, was established in 1952, a 110-mile cattle drive held annually on a route close to the Chisholm Trail from Cuero to San Antonio in conjunction with the San Antonio Livestock Show and Rodeo.

The rodeo grand entry is a short form of mass riding for ceremonial purposes, where officials, rodeo queens, and many of the competitors enter the riding arena to be introduced at the beginning of each evening's event. Such performances usually are combined with presentation of flags, music, and playing of the national anthem.

At a powwow grand entry, the dancers who will perform enter the competition grounds in full regalia in a processional format that respects the traditions of indigenous people. An eagle feather staff with deep spiritual meaning begins the procession, followed by the American flag and other flags, often carried by military veterans. Dancers enter in sequence based upon the relative status of the event, and elders enter before younger people. Once everyone has entered, there is an invocation, and a Native drum group usually performs a Flag Song and a Veterans’ Song.

== Mexico ==
=== Sonora ===
In Sonora, cavalcades are regular annual events in March and October.

On 26 through 28 October 2007 the Governor of Sonora, Eduardo Bours, and the regional Cattlemen's Association led a cavalcade of approximately 7,000 cowboys who were primarily from the local area, the state of Sonora, some other Mexican states and several western U.S. states. The cavalcade was called Remontando El Río Sahuaripa 2007, and the route covered 61 kilometers. Beginning in Sahuaripa, the group traveled south following the river upstream, through the municipality of Arivechi, passing the banks of the Cajon de Onapa Reservoir Lake, and ending in the village of Guisamopa. The cowboys and horses were fed and supplied by an elaborate "Chuck Wagon" system. That cavalcade is the focal end stage of the 500 km (310 mi) Cabalgando por Sonora from the Río Sonora to the Sierra Alta.

=== Chihuahua ===
In Chihuahua, two separate cavalcades commemorate the history of the Mexican Revolution and Francisco (Pancho) Villa.

==== Cabalgata Binacional Villista ====
Each year in February and March, the Cabalgata Binacional Villista commemorates the 9 March 1916 invasion of the United States by Pancho Villa's men. The first cavalcade took place in 1999 and followed the same route that Pancho Villa used, coming from the Hacienda de San Jerónimo, Bachíniva. A handful of riders were expected but more than 125 showed up. The Cabalgata passed Namiquipa and Cruces, as during the original 1916 event. In 2008 the 9th cavalcade began on 27 February in Ciudad Madera with more than 200 riders. During the next 10 days, they traversed 397 km (247 mi) north through towns and villages in northern Mexico (Ignacio Zaragoza, Buenaventura, Galeana, Nuevo Casas Grandes, Casas Grandes, Colonia Graciano Sánchez, Janos, Ascensión, Seis de Enero) to Puerto Palomas de Villa, arriving on 7 March with a complement of 400 riders and twice as many crew.

On 8 March 100 riders continued across the United States–Mexico border 3 miles to the Pancho Villa State Park and Museum in the village of Columbus, New Mexico. From the border the Villistas were accompanied by 200 American riders. The 8th cavalcade in 2007 was larger, with 500 riders arriving in Puerto Palomas de Villa. The 7th cavalcade in 2006 was smaller but the arrival of the 100 Villistas at Pancho Villa State Park coincided with ceremonies attended by New Mexico Governor Bill Richardson, Chihuahua Governor José Reyes Baeza Terrazas, and many other dignitaries. The cavalcade in 2010 was the opening event of the centennial celebrations Tres Siglos, Tres Fiestas (Three Centuries, Three Fiestas).

The riders are received each night with a dinner, rodeo, music and dancing, and their horses are fed and watered. The growing popularity of the cavalcade presented increasing financial challenges for the communities along the route. In 2008, the community presidents formed an association, Presidentes Municipales de la Región Noroeste, to coordinate and manage the event.

Horses traveling from Mexico to the United States normally are subject to quarantine of at least 3 days, but starting in 2006, a special 12-hour waiver was obtained for up to 100 horses (hence the limit of 100 Villistas). Before 2006, the Mexican horses were left behind in Mexico, and the Villistas rode American horses from the border to the park.

The 11th cavalcade in 2010 began on February 23 in Hacienda San Jerónimo, Bachíniva, repeating the historical original route, passing through Namiquipa, Cruces to Buenaventura. There the cavalcade joined the group coming from Madera, continuing together up to Columbus, New Mexico.

==== Cabalgata Villista ====
Each year in July the Cabalgata Villista (also known as La Gran Cabalgata Villista) commemorates the assassination of Francisco (Pancho) Villa on 20 July 1923 in Parral. The cavalcade was initiated by José Socorro Salcido Gómez in 1996. It travels to Parral from Chihuahua City, a distance of 220 km (140 mi), led by municipal, state, and federal dignitaries. In general, its route passes through Satevó and Valle de Zaragoza, with riders (jinetes) joining the cavalcade along the way. Since 1996 the cavalcade has grown progressively larger; in 2007 3,000 riders participated. The 2008 cavalcade was still larger. In 2009, the cavalcade began with 500 riders departing from Chihuahua City. Participating villages, cities, and municipalities included Matamoros, Valle de Allende, San Francisco del Oro, Santa Bárbara, municipio de López, Zaragoza, El Tule, Huejotitán, Balleza, Coronado, and Jiménez.

=== Coahuila, Nuevo León and Tamaulipas ===
In Coahuila, Nuevo León and Tamaulipas, on 12 March 2005 the fifth Cabalgata Interestatal (tri-state cavalcade) included 10,500 riders along a 10 km (6.2 mi) portion of its 52 km (32 mi) length.

=== Guanajuato ===
In Guanajuato, a cavalcade pilgrimage occurs at Epiphany to the shrine of Cristo Rey.

== New Zealand ==
In New Zealand, an annual Otago Goldfields Cavalcade is held. Different towns in Central Otago play host at the culmination of the cavalcade each year, with Cromwell, Ophir, and Clyde having been among the host towns. Some years the cavalcade's route follows the Dunstan Trail, a principal route of the Central Otago gold rush, from Clarks Junction near Middlemarch to the site of the former Dunstan goldfields. This route covers much the same journey as the Otago Central Rail Trail, though it is shorter and over far rougher terrain. The first re-enactment cavalcade was in 1991, from near Dunedin to Cromwell. More than 200 people (and 240 horses) took part in the 1991 cavalcade.

== Colombia ==
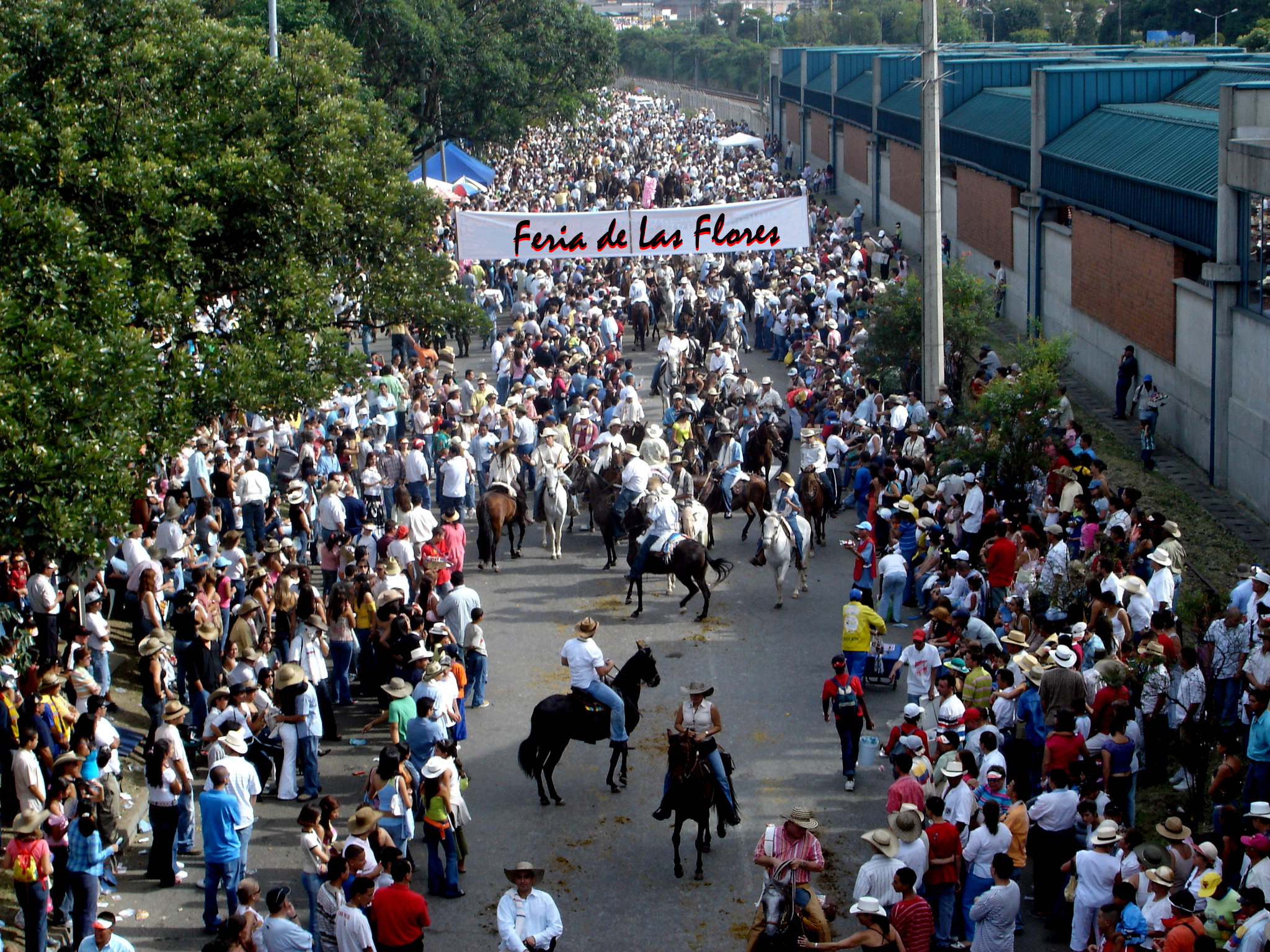
Medellín

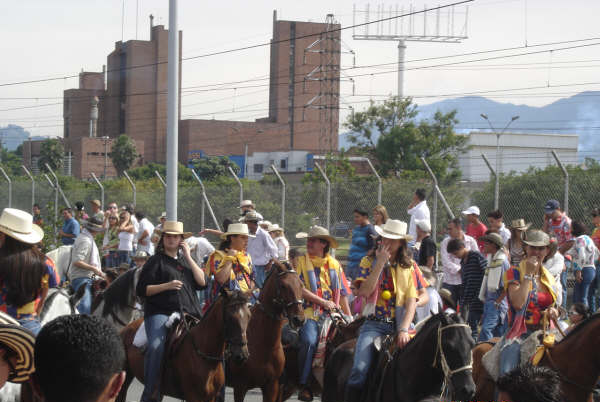
Medellín

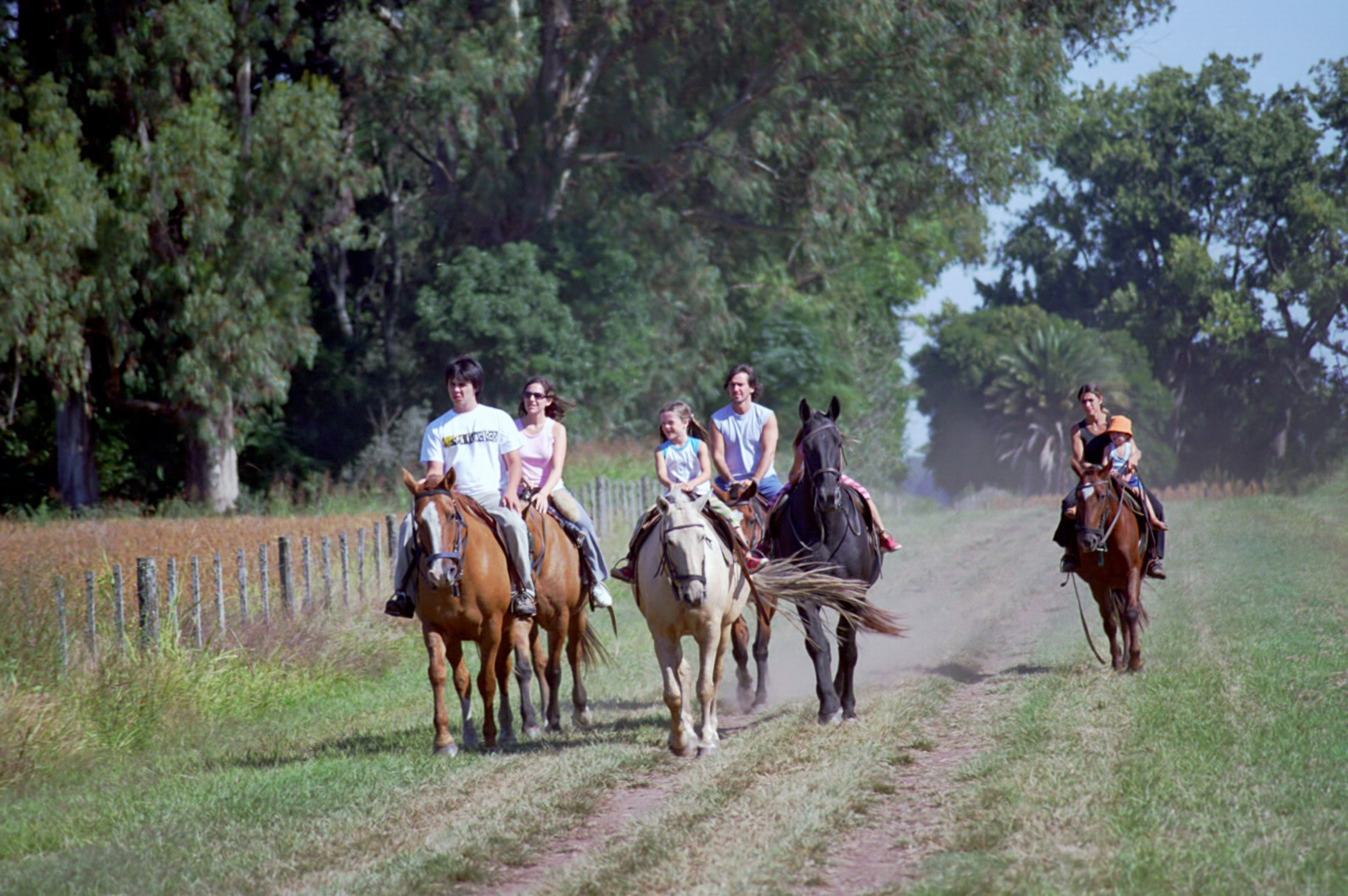
Junín

In Colombia, riding in cavalcades is a recreation enjoyed throughout the mountains. In Medellín, a cavalcade is an important part of the annual Festival of the Flowers.

== See also ==
- Parade horse
- Convoy
- Stibbert museum
