= Styx Creek =

River in New Zealand

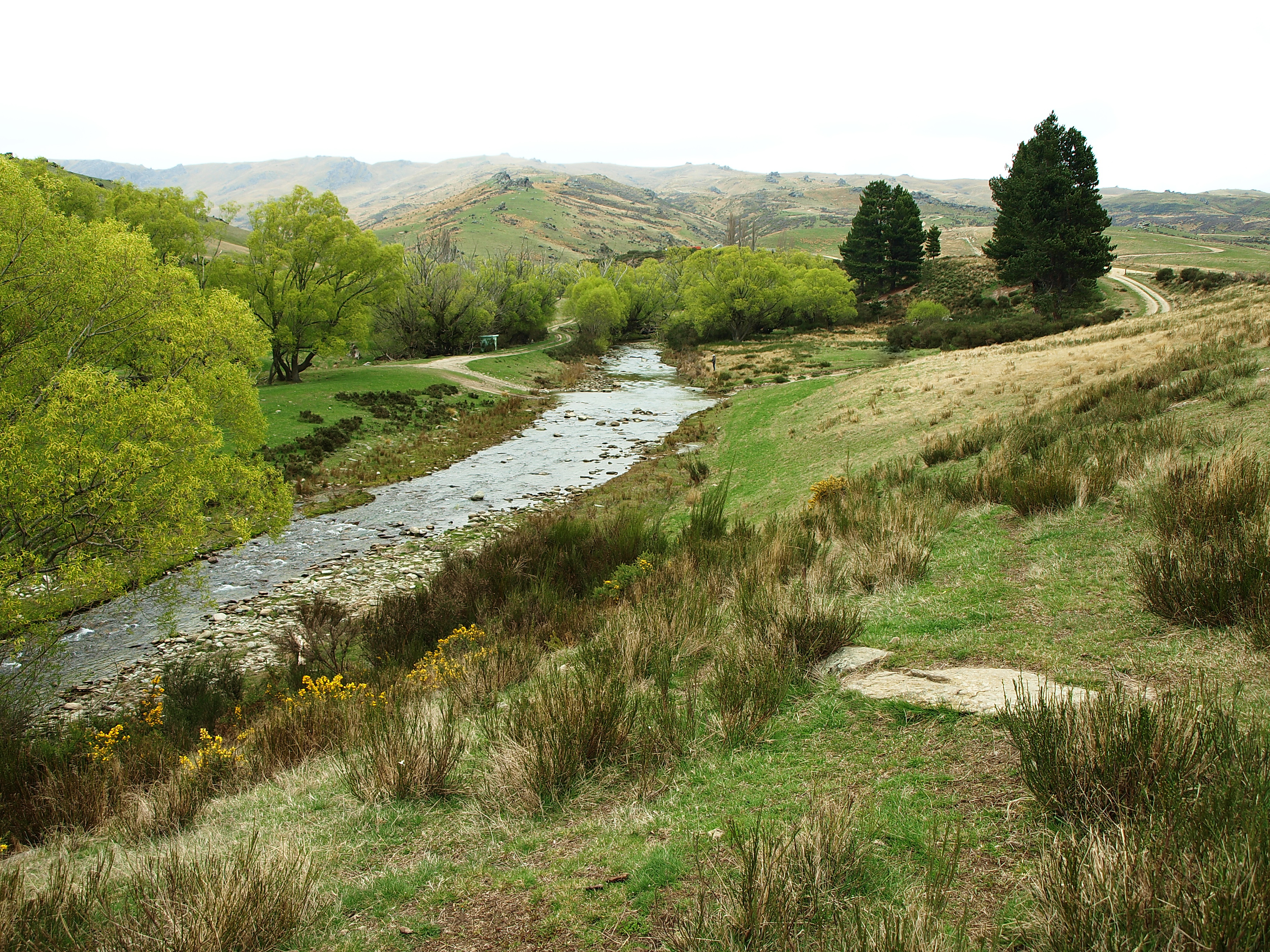

- Mouth of the Styx Creek Styx Creek (South Island)

Location
- Country: New Zealand

Physical characteristics
- Source: Rock and Pillar Range
  - coordinates: 45°28′50″S 170°00′08″E
- Mouth
  - location: Taieri River
  - coordinates: 45°25′08″S 169°56′44″E

Basin features
- Progression: Styx Creek → Taieri River → Pacific Ocean

Styx Creek is a small to medium-sized natural stream in the Central Otago region of New Zealand. It flows into the Taieri River in the valley near Paerau, about 70 kilometres (43 mi) northwest of Dunedin.

It was given the name Styx by John Turnbull Thomson (1821–1884) chief surveyor of Otago after what is in mythology, the name of one of the five rivers which all converge at the centre of the Greek underworld on a great marsh, which sometimes is also called the Styx.

In the Paerau district upstream of the confluence of the Taieri River with the creek, the Taieri was forded by the Old Dunstan Road (Dunstan Trail) which provided the most direct route in the 19th century from Dunedin to the Central Otago goldfields. the trail crosses the Rock and Pillar Range from Clark's Junction (near Middlemarch) and descends into the Upper Taieri, whence it crosses the Taieri River. Originally the second overnighting stop from Dunedin (after Clark's Junction), its importance meant two hotels operated on either side of the river in case there was a flood. Besides one of the hotels was a stable and a jailhouse.

This settlement situated on an outcrop of flat land originally bordered on three sides by the river, and on the fourth by a sheer cliff face and the surrounding area became known as "The Styx".

When gold was discovered in Central Otago the provincial government was quick to take over the responsibility of moving the precious metal safely to Dunedin. When they used the Old Dunstan Road an overnight stop was usually made at Styx. As a result, a stone stable was built in the 1860s to cater for the horses of the gold escort and other travellers, while they stayed at the Styx Hotel which was located next door. In keeping with its name, the hotel had a coin embedded in the bar, alluding to the coin required for the ferryman across the river to the underworld. Styx Hotel was run by the McNutt family during the 1940s. The nearby stone jailhouse was also built in the 1860 and while it may have housed some prisoners in transit or an occasional local troublemaker it was mostly used by the gold escort to store the gold overnight. The strongbox that contained the gold was secured to the inside wall by chains.

The opening of other routes which while longer were open all year and the Otago Central Railway and Alexandria caused the Old Dunstan road to fall into disuse and thus patronage of the crossing at Styx.

The stables and jailhouse and hotels still exist.
