= Paerau =

Coordinates: 45°25′S 169°57′E

Paerau is a small settlement in inland Central Otago in New Zealand's South Island. It is located in the Strath Taieri, the upper valley of the Taieri River, at the foot of the Rock and Pillar Range. "Paerau" is a Māori-language name meaning "one hundred ridges".

Despite being geographically close to Middlemarch and Roxburgh, the terrain and roads mean that Ranfurly and Patearoa are the more closely related communities of interest.

Paerau is also colloquially referred to as Styx.

== History ==
As well as the Taieri River the district is also home to the Styx Creek, a small tributary of the Taieri River. The creek was given the name Styx by John Turnbull Thomson (1821–1884) chief surveyor of Otago after what is in mythology, the name of one of the five rivers which all converge at the centre of the Greek underworld on a great marsh, which sometimes is also called the Styx.

Upstream of the confluence of the Taieri River with the Styx Creek, the Taieri is forded by the Old Dunstan Road (Dunstan Trail) which provided the most direct route in the 19th century from Dunedin to the Central Otago goldfields. The trail crosses the Rock and Pillar Range from Clark's Junction (near Middlemarch) and descends into the Upper Taieri, whence it crosses the Taieri River. From the Paerau district the Old Dunstan Road continued on via the Serpentine goldfields to the Poolburn Reservoir and eventually to Alexandra.

Originally the second overnighting stop from Dunedin (after Clark's Junction), Styx's importance meant two hotels operated on either side of the river in case there was a flood. Besides one of the hotels was a stable and a jailhouse.

When gold was discovered in Central Otago the provincial government was quick to take over the responsibility of moving the precious metal safely to Dunedin. When they used the Old Dunstan Road an overnight stop was usually made at Styx. As a result a stone stable was built in the 1860s to cater for the horses of the gold escort and other travellers, while they stayed at the Styx Hotel which was located next door.

The nearby stone jailhouse was also built in the 1860 and while it may have housed some prisoners in transit or an occasional local troublemaker it was mostly used by the gold escort to store the gold overnight. The strongbox that contained the gold was secured to the inside wall by chains.

The opening of other routes which while longer were open all year and the Otago Central Railway and Alexandria caused the Old Dunstan road to fall into disuse and thus patronage of the crossing at Styx.

In keeping with this theme, the hotel had a coin embedded in the bar, alluding to the coin required for the ferryman across the river to the underworld.

== Geography ==
Paerau is located in a large scroll plain called the Styx Basin crossed by the Taieri River, Logan Burn, Serpentine Creek and Styx Creek. The meanderings of the water ways are extremely complex, leaving many small oxbow lakes. These wetlands stretch from near Paerau to Canadian Hut. The area includes the 136 ha Serpentine Wildlife Management Reserve.

The site of the Styx crossing of the Taieri River is several kilometres from the modern 'hub' of Paerau, where the school was once located.

Located in the southern end of the Rock and Pillar Range, about 12 km south of Paerau, is the Loganburn Dam which impounds the Great Moss Swamp (also known as the Loganburn Reservoir to provide irrigation for 9,300 ha to water for the Paerau hydro power station.

== Economy ==
The economy is based on agriculture. The district is also home to the Paerau hydro power station.

== Education ==
The Paerau school was established in 1915 and closed in 2012 due to a falling roll. At one time the Tacon family contributed 60% of the school roll, it was never the same after they left in the early 1980's.
