= Maniototo Irrigation Scheme =

Irrigation project in Central Otago, New Zealand

Coordinates: 45°20′55″S 169°56′40″E

The Maniototo Irrigation Scheme forms part of a once much-larger proposed irrigation project on the Maniototo Plain in Central Otago, New Zealand.

The irrigation scheme is sourced by waters in both the Taieri River and Loganburn Reservoir. Water is released from the Loganburn Reservoir through Loganburn Creek until the confluence of the Taieri River. The water travels along the Taieri River until the Paerau Weir, from here it is diverted and travels to the Paerau Headpond before going through the Paerau Powerstation or continuing down river.

== History ==
The Maniototo Irrigation Scheme began in 1973 at an estimated cost of $NZ6.2 million, being commissioned in 1984 at a final cost of $NZ32 million.
