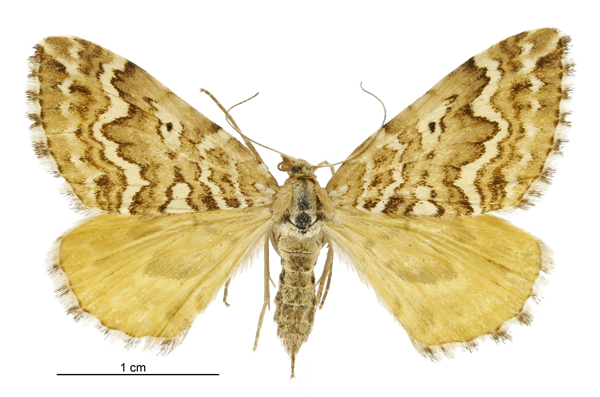
- Female
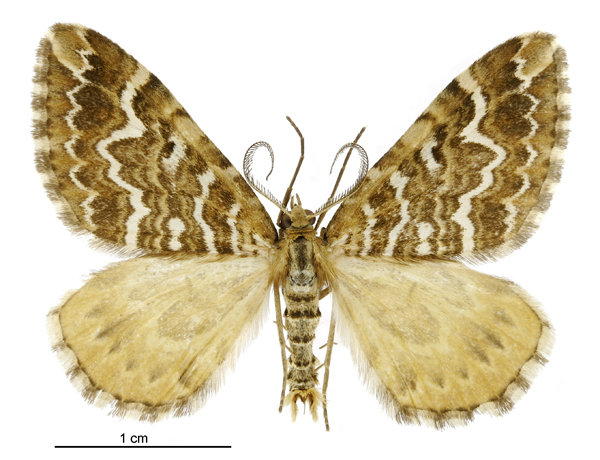
- Male

Scientific classification
- Kingdom: Animalia
- Phylum: Arthropoda
- Clade: Pancrustacea
- Class: Insecta
- Order: Lepidoptera
- Family: Geometridae
- Genus: Asaphodes
- Species: A. clarata

Binomial name
- Asaphodes clarata (Walker, 1862)

Synonyms
- Larentia clarata Walker, 1862; Xanthorhoe clarata (Walker, 1862); Cidaria pyramaria Guenée, 1868

= Asaphodes clarata =

Species of moth endemic to New Zealand

Asaphodes clarata, also known as the large striped carpet moth, is a species of moth of the family Geometridae. This species is endemic to New Zealand and has been found on the North and South Islands. The species inhabits open grassy areas, including tussock grasslands, in montane habitat. The larvae feed on the leaves of Ranunculus species. The adult moths are day flying and are on the wing from December to February and have been shown to pollinate Celmisia laricifolia and Hebe pinguifolia.

== Taxonomy ==
This species was described by Francis Walker in 1862 as Larentia clarata using material collected in Waikouaiti in Otago. Meyrick discussed this species under that name in both 1883 and 1884 and also synonymised Cidaria pyramaria with this species. George Hudson also discussed and illustrated this species under the name Xanthorhoe clarata in both 1898 and in 1928. In 1971 John S. Dugdale confirmed the placement of this species in the genus Asaphodes. In 1988 Dugdale confirmed this placement in his catalogue of New Zealand Lepidoptera. The female holotype specimen, collected at Waikouaiti, is held at the Natural History Museum, London.

== Description ==
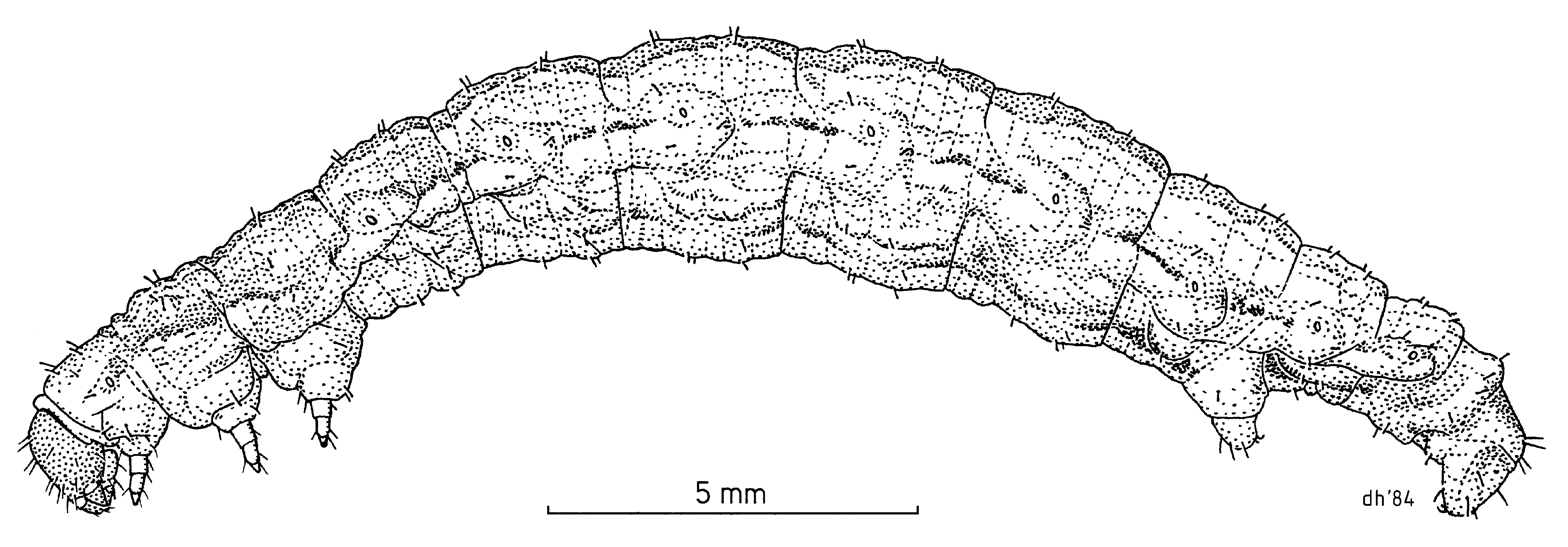
A. clarata larva.

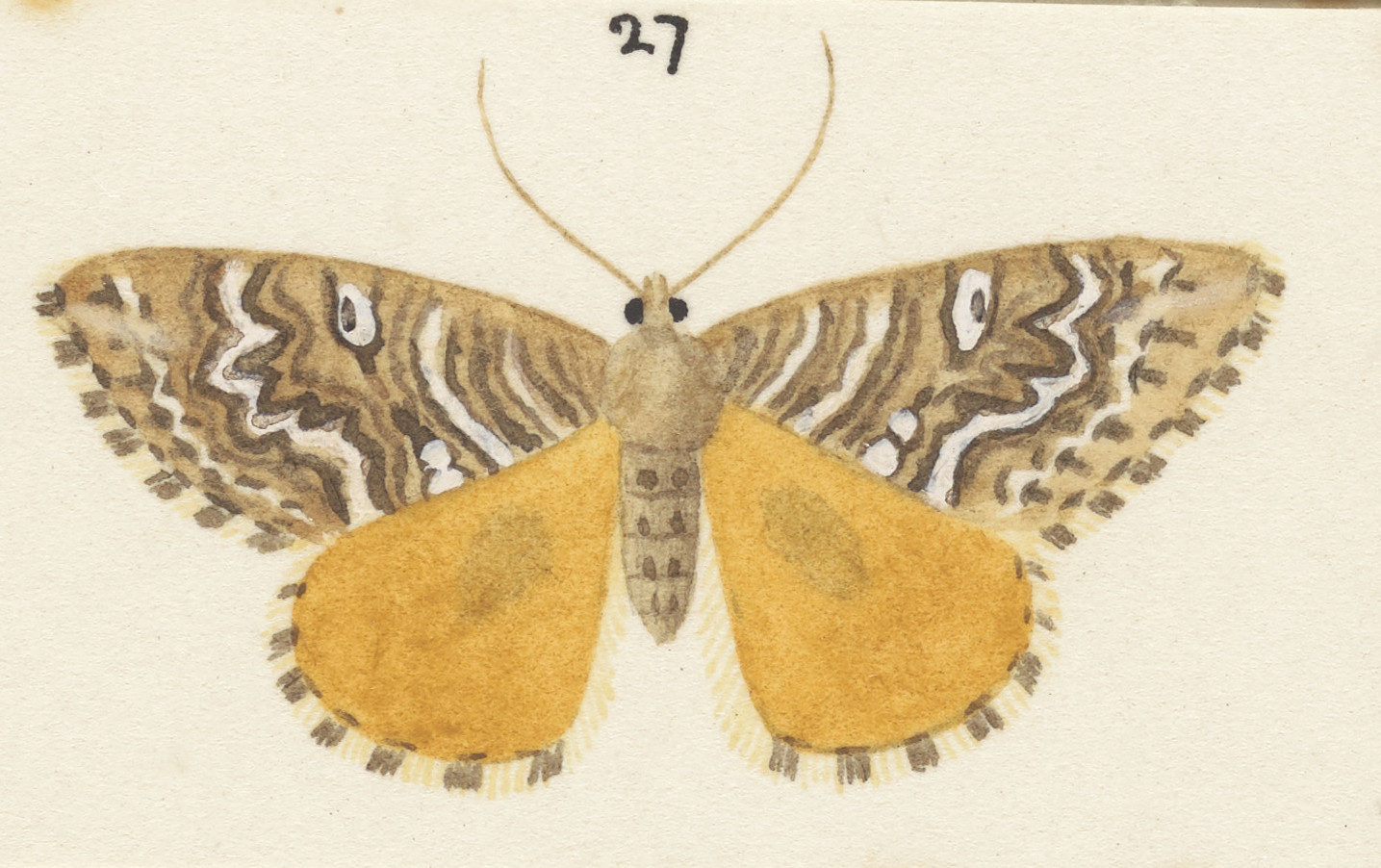
Illustration of female A. clarata by George Hudson.

Hudson described the species as follows:

The expansion of the wings of the male is 1 1/2 inches, of the female 1 3/8 inches. The species differs from the preceding in the following respects : The ground colour of the forewings is brighter, the markings are less oblique and much more jagged; the large white central band is often broken up into several distinct oval patches, the costal edge is very slightly shaded with brown, and the transverse lines do not disappear before reaching the costa. The hind-wings are bright ochreous. The cilia of all the wings are white, strongly barred with yellowish-brown.

This species varies in the colour intensity and the width of the white markings of its forewings.

== Distribution ==
A. clarata is endemic to New Zealand. It is an upland species and occurs on the tussock covered slopes of ranges in both the North and South Islands. It has been recorded as being present in Otago and in Canterbury.

== Behaviour ==
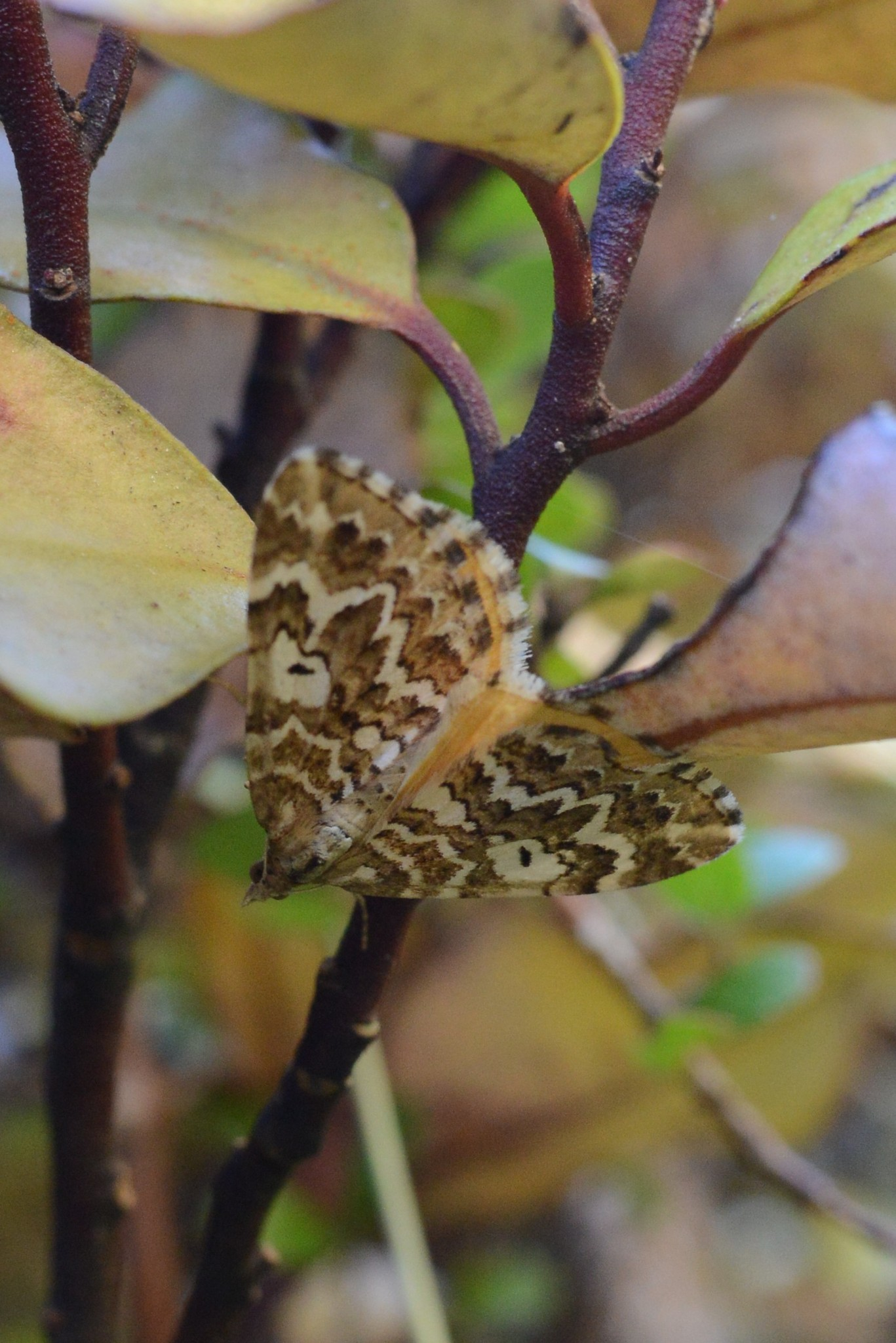
Live A. clarata.

The adults of this species are on the wing from November to March. It is a day flying moth.

== Habitat and host species ==
This species frequents open grassy patches in montane habitat. Larvae of this species feed on the foliage of Ranunculus species. The adult moth has been shown to pollinate Celmisia laricifolia and Hebe pinguifolia. It is attracted to light.
