= Poolburn Reservoir =

Reservoir in Central Otago, New Zealand

- Poolburn Dam
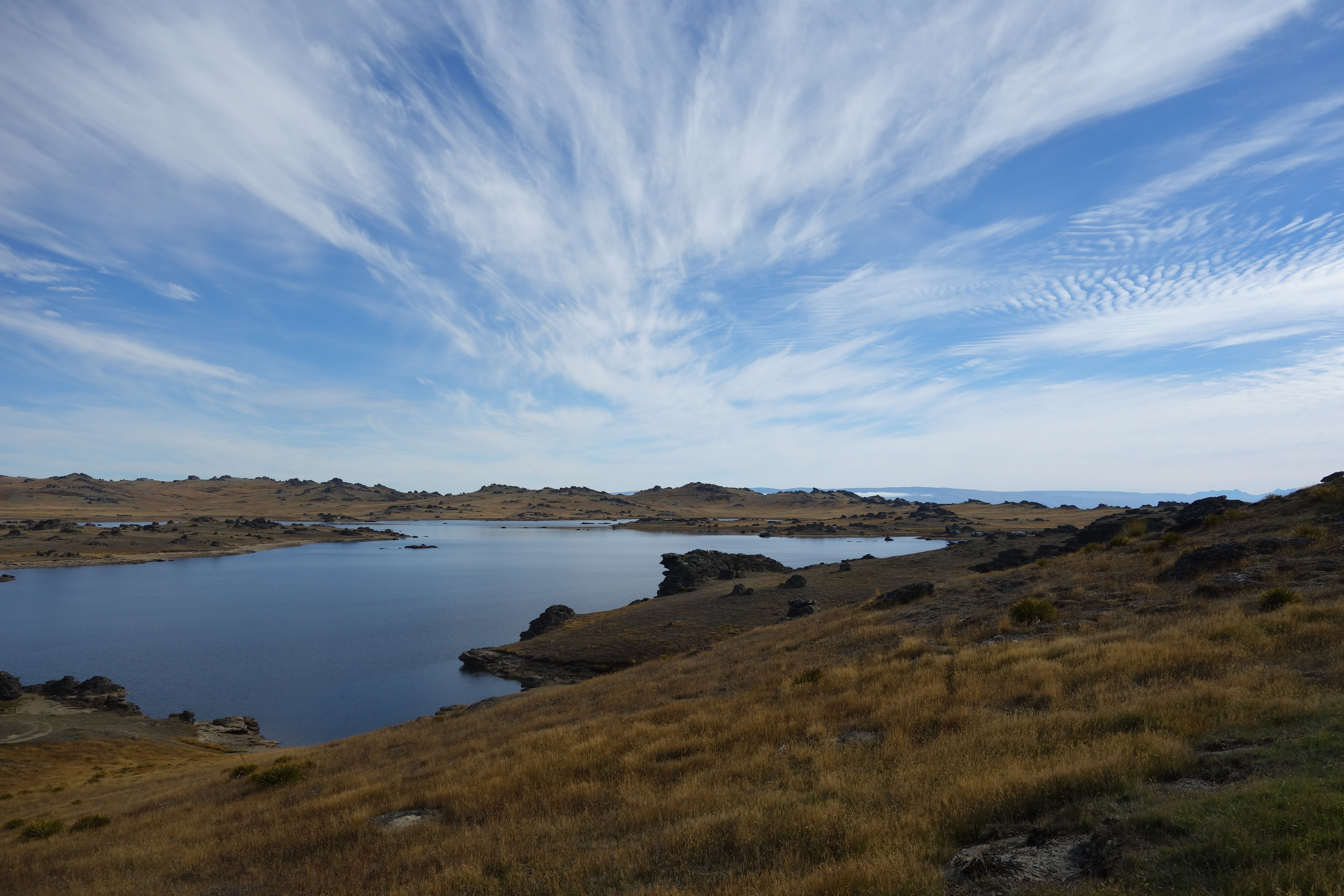
- Poolburn Reservoir in April 2015
- Interactive map of Poolburn Reservoir
- Location: Central Otago, New Zealand
- Coordinates: 45°19′S 169°45′E
- Type: Reservoir
- Built: 1930–1931
- Surface area: 300 hectares (3.0 km^{2})

Poolburn Reservoir, also known as Poolburn Dam, is a reservoir in Central Otago, New Zealand. Built during the Great Depression for irrigation but also as an employment initiative, the water is used by farmers in the Ida Valley.

== Geography ==
The reservoir is located west of the Rough Ridge Range. Long Valley Creek feeds the reservoir, and the reservoir itself feeds the Pool Burn. The Pool Burn flows into the Ida Valley, combines with the Ida Burn, and breaks through the Raggedy Range as the Poolburn Gorge before flowing into the Manuherikia River.

== Access ==
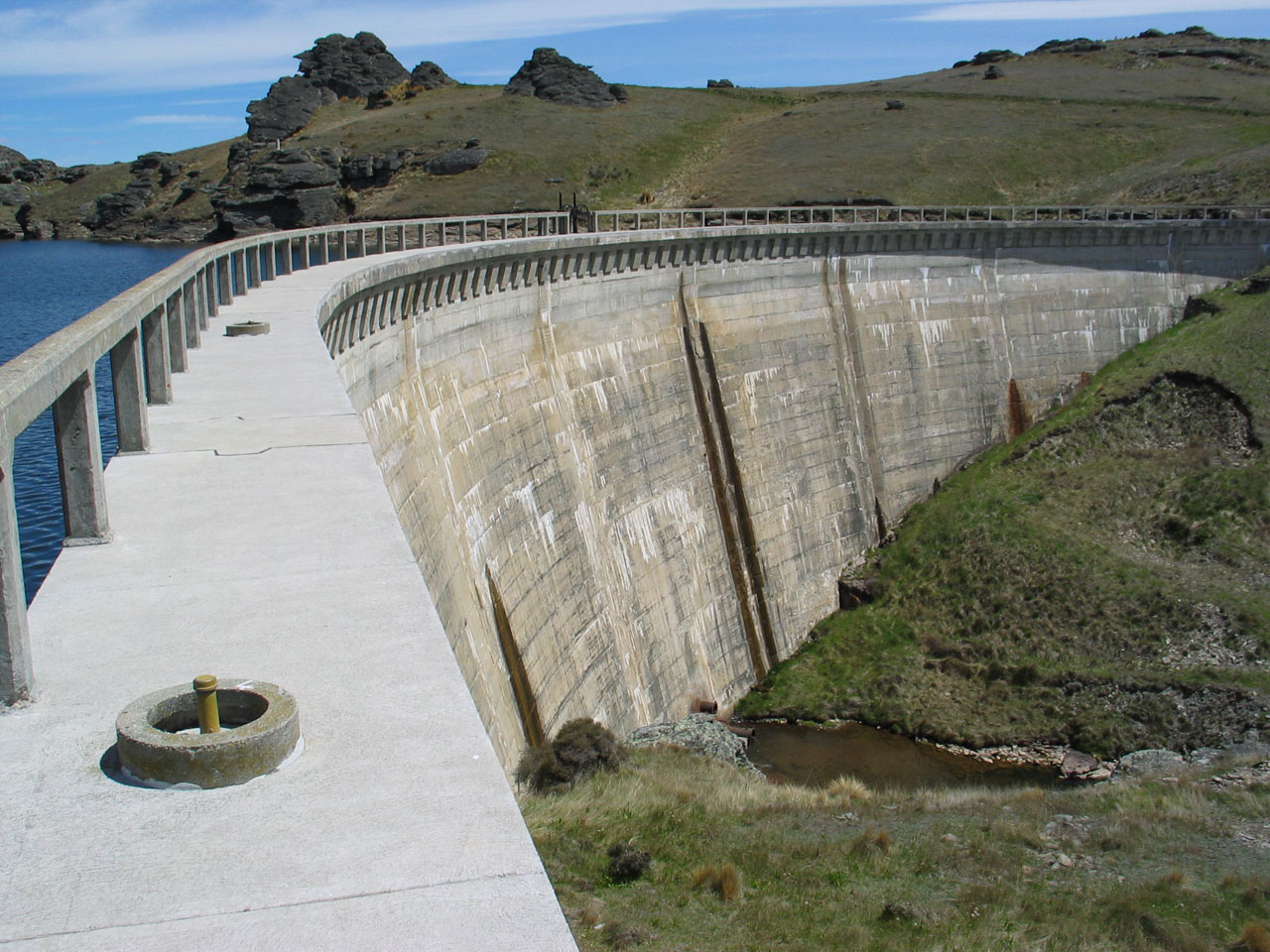
Poolburn Reservoir dam

There is access to Poolburn Reservoir from either Omakau in the Manuherikia Valley (30 kilometres or 19 miles) or from Oturehua in the Ida Valley (43 kilometres or 27 miles). There is also access from Paerau over the Rock and Pillar Range (24 kilometres or 15 miles), but this is a dry-weather road only that can be negotiated by four-wheel drive only, and is not generally recommended. The high parts of the road are closed from early June to late September each year, and Poolburn Reservoir thus cannot be accessed by road during winter. The road from Paerau to the Ida Valley via Poolburn Reservoir is part of the Old Dunstan Road that gave gold diggers access to the gold fields during the early days of the Otago gold rush. The journey from Dunedin to the gold fields took five days. An alternative route to the gold fields starting in Palmerston was longer by 50 kilometres (31 mi) but much easier to travel on, as it did cross any mountainous ranges or major rivers. This became the major wagon route and is today State Highway 85. With no major settlements along its way, much of the Old Dunstan Road was never fully formed, resulting in only seasonal access to Poolburn Reservoir. Since 2004, council staff fly in by helicopter to lock the mountainous roads each winter.

== History ==
A deputation went to see the Minister of Labour and Transport, Bill Veitch, in March 1929 with regards to a proposal for an irrigation dam for the benefit of Ida Valley farmers. The United Government approved the scheme by September of that year, partially as an employment initiative during the Great Depression, and charged the Department of Public Works with its construction and put £71,823 into the 1930 budget. Preliminary work, including the construction of the access road from the Ida Valley, started in late 1929. The Minister of Public Works, William Taverner, reported in August 1930 that the excavation for the concrete arch dam had been filled to approximately ground level. Poolburn Reservoir was completed by late 1931. The reservoir is located on the Old Dunstan Road and the flooded area had five hotels.

The concrete arch dam is about 100 feet (30 m) high and 480 feet (150 m) long at the dam's crest. Approximately 14,000 cubic yards (11,000 m^{3}) of concrete were used to construct the dam. During construction, scaffolding collapsed resulting in seven men sustaining injuries, with two men initially in critical condition. In June 1931, one worker died from a fall at the site.

Today, the dam is administered by the Ida Valley Irrigation Company. When full, the reservoir covers over 300 hectares (3.0 km^{2}). Poolburn Reservoir and Poolburn Dam are alternative names for the same body of water.

== Usage ==
Brown trout and rainbow trout were introduced into the reservoir, but only brown trout remain. The other aquatic species that can be caught is the New Zealand freshwater crayfish koura.

Poolburn Reservoir was used to depict Rohan in The Lord of the Rings film trilogy.

There are many baches around the reservoir. An application to subdivide a 902 hectares (2,230 acres) land holding for housing was withdrawn just prior to the hearing, as the commissioner for the Central Otago District Council had recommended for consent to be refused.
