= Rock and Pillar Range =

Mountain range in Otago, New Zealand

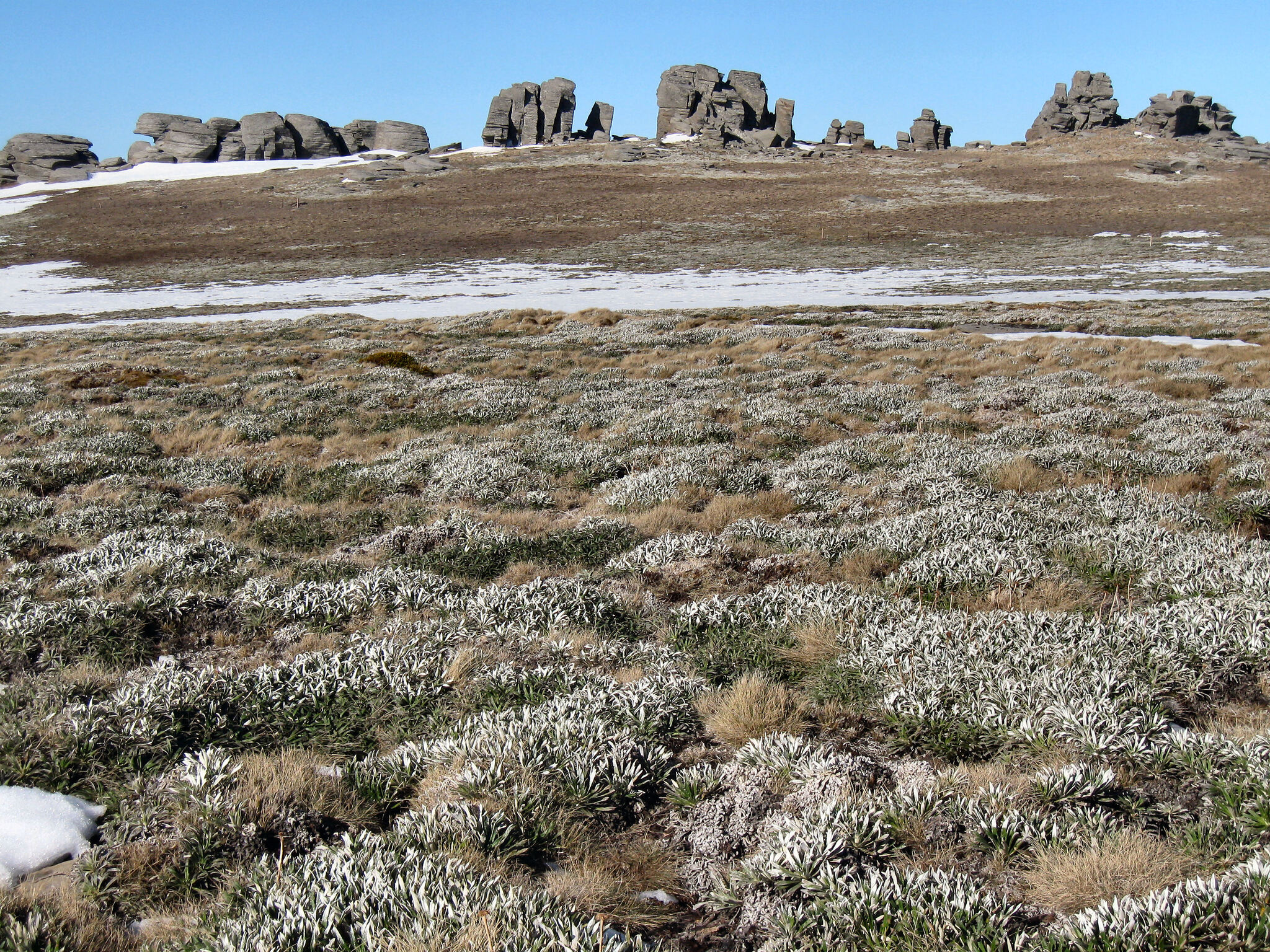
- The Rock and Pillar Range near Summit Rock as observed in September, with snow and Celmisia viscosa plants

Highest point
- Peak: Summit Rock
- Elevation: 1,450 m (4,760 ft)
- Coordinates: 45.425°S 170.071°E

Dimensions
- Length: 23 km (14 mi)

Naming
- Native name: Patearoa (Māori)

Geography
- Named features in the Rock and Pillar Range
- Location: South Island, New Zealand
- Range coordinates: 45°23′S 170°07′E

The Rock and Pillar Range (Māori: Patearoa), is a range of high hills is located in the Maniototo, an area of inland Otago, in the South Island of New Zealand, about 53 km (33 mi) from the east coast.

The range is surrounded on three sides by the Taieri River, which has its source in the nearby Lammerlaw Range. The river flows out across the scroll plain at Paerau, along the north west flanks of the Rock and Pillar Range before almost doubling back on itself at Waipiata and flowing back along the eastern side past Hyde through the Strath-Taieri. The Great Moss Swamp lies on the upper surface of the range. The town of Middlemarch lies close to the Taieri River to the east of the range, and Patearoa lies to the northwest.

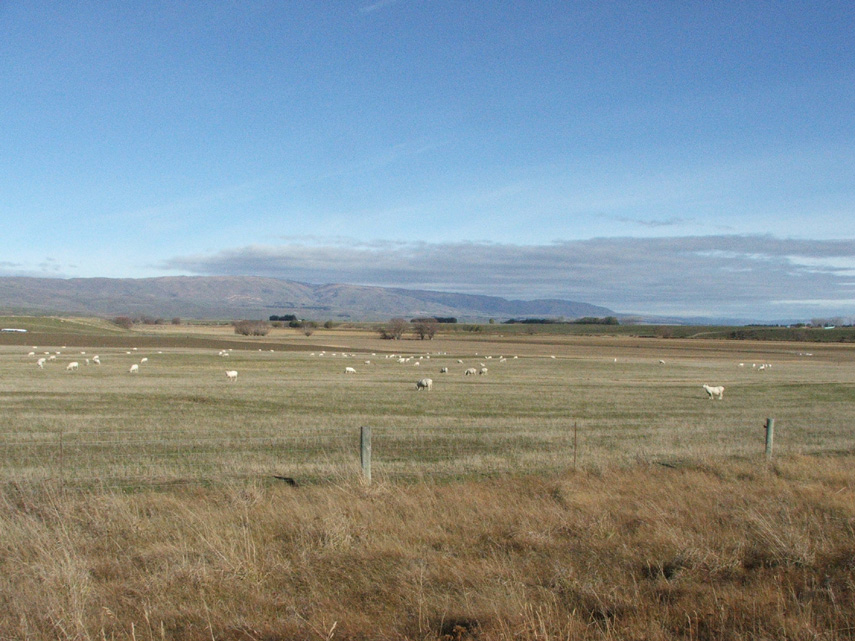
The north end of the Rock and Pillar Range is visible in the distance in this picture taken from near Ranfurly

The Rock and Pillars are a horst range, caused by movement on two parallel faults uplifting the area in between. The range is characterised by a very flat plateau at the top that is approximately 23 km (14 mi) long and 6 km (3.7 mi) wide, with steep escarpments on either side.

There is an often persistent and unusual cloud formation associated with the range. This strange cloud formation is more or less stationary and is called the Taieri Pet by the local inhabitants. It is formed by high north-westerly winds being forced upward over the Rock and Pillar range.

The Rock and Pillar Range is the border separating the Central Otago District from the Dunedin City administrative area within the Otago Region.

Big Hut, situated near the summit of the range, is available for public use.

== Peaks ==
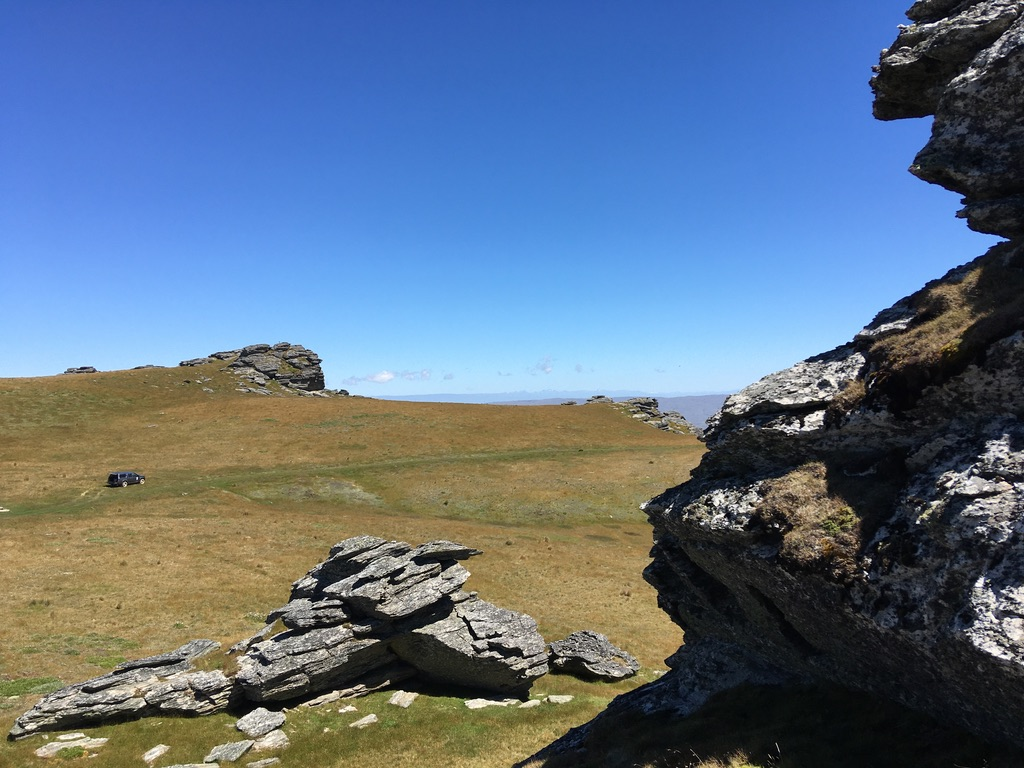
Tors in the Rock and Pillar Range

Many rock tors that are each 10 to 20 m (33 to 66 ft) tall are dotted across the summit plateau, and the range takes its name from these rock formations. The highest point in the range is Summit Rock at 1,450 metres (4,760 ft) which has also been called Summit Peak. Other named peaks include Museum Rock at 1,380 metres (4,530 ft) (locally also called Stonehenge, although this name is also used on the other side of the range near Paerau) and McPhee's Rock at 1,010 metres (3,310 ft).

== Fauna and flora ==
The nationally endangered Burgan Skink is endemic to the Rock and Pillar range.

An invertebrate survey at one shrubland location in 2001 showed that 90% of the species found are endemic to New Zealand. The Rock and Pillar Range is also an area of narrow-range endemism for New Zealand endemic moths. The moth species Ichneutica schistella can only be found in this area.

The vegetation of the high elevation habitats of the Rock and Pillar Range has been the subject of numerous studies by New Zealand botanist Alan Mark and colleagues. The Rock and Pillar Range has a similar alpine vegetation to other mountain ranges in Central Otago, such as the Old Man Range. In the Rock and Pillar Range, the alpine vegetation is found above 1,200 m (3,900 ft). There are three main types of high elevation habitats: the dominant herbfields, cushionfields, and snowbanks, the latter two of which form patches or mosaics within the herbfields. There are also wetland communities including streambeds, mires, and wet scrub.

The dominant plants of the alpine herbfield include Celmisia viscosa, Poa colensoi, Carex fuscovaginata and Luzula rufa, plus a number of other herbs, cushions and lichens. Isolated plants of snow tussock (Chionochloa rigida and C. macra) are also present, the remnants of what was once alpine snow tussock grasslands. Some of the common plants found in the cushionfields include Dracophyllum muscoides, Raoulia grandiflora, Celmisia laricifolia, Anisotome imbricata, and several lichens. Snowbank communities, of which five subtypes have been identified, contain plants such as Celmisia haastii, Coprosma perpusilla, Anisotome flexuosa, Geum leiospermum, and Poa colensoi.

The Rock and Pillar Range has three endemic plant species or varieties: Celmisia haastii var. tomentosa, Kelleria villosa var. barbata, and Abrotanella patearoa. It also harbours other species with narrow geographic ranges such as Myosotis umbrosa and the flightless chafer beetle Prodontria montis, which are only known from the Rock and Pillar Range and the nearby Lammerlaw Range.
