= Waipiata =

Historic place in New Zealand

Coordinates: 45°11′01″S 170°09′42″E

Waipiata is an historic place on the Otago Central Rail Trail, in Central Otago, New Zealand. Waipiata is also the name of many New Zealand coastal vessels, steamers, freighters and steamships.

== History ==
Waipiata became a thriving township as the Otago Central Railway line snaked across the Maniototo Plain. A school opened in 1891. The nearby village of Kokonga was the railway camp.

In 1914 the Waipiata Sanatorium, a private facility owned by Dr George Byres was constructed, a few kilometres south of Waipiata near the old Hamiltons gold field. In the early 1920s Dr Byres' facility was taken over by the Hospital Board and continued for a long period as a sanatorium for tuberculosis patients. The sanatorium closed in 1961 and the buildings became a corrective and training centre for the Justice Department until 1979, after which the government sold the site. Today it remains a privately owned property.

A factory with 78 employees processed rabbits from 1901 at Coneys Creek (Green Bridge) until a factory was built in Waipiata. This operated until a slump in prices closed it by the 1930s. The buildings were later used for a variety of purposes, e.g. as a woolshed and as a concrete works. Waipiata today has an hotel, a bowling green, tennis courts, a domain, a library, a large public hall and private and holiday homes. The iron bridge, known locally as the 'Green Bridge', was built in 1896. Timber from the original bridge was used for the side rails and decking. It is the only flood-free road crossing of the Taieri River in the Maniototo. Considerable money has been spent rebuilding both the north and south abutments. It has recently been repainted its original green colour. The Central Otago District Plan Schedule 19.4 includes the Green Bridge, the War Memorial and Hamiltons Cemetery in its register of heritage buildings, places, sites and objects. Hamiltons Cemetery has been restored and a memorial plaque put in place to record all those buried there. There is an information kiosk on site. A book released in August 2008, "Old Waipiata" by Jim Sullivan, features pictures and stories up until about 1950.

== Art ==
Grahame Sydney, one of New Zealand's most successful landscape painters, has long been captivated by the local landforms and views. Cook House is an example, Demolition at Waipiata is another.

== Tourism ==
New Zealand domestic and International visitors cycling the Otago Central Rail Trail pass through Waipiata.

Special care is required in the summer as the temperatures can rise above 40 °C, but the days can also be cold and wet, more suited to hard-core bikers than casual cyclists. Spring is often a windy time with a cold bite in the mornings. The weather is better in late spring. Summer has very hot days, which are long, so that biking in the cooler parts of the day avoids the heat. In Autumn the weather is more settled without the temperature extremes and forest fires of the other seasons. Late autumn colours appear in mid to late April. This is the busiest time on the trail.

== Geology ==
"The Miocene Waipiata Volcanic Field (WVF) is an eroded phreatomagmatic volcanic field. Pyroclastic rocks of most of the Waipiata vents record initial phreatomagmatic explosive activity fuelled by groundwater followed by Strombolian-style eruptions. The longest vent alignment, traceable in 30 km, coincides with and is parallel to the largest fault zone in the Otago region, the NW-SE trending Waihemo- fault zone."

Geological examination of the Lherzolite xenolith bearing flows from the east Otago province with regard to the crystal fractionation of upper mantle magmas, results; "The limited data support the contention that the asthenosphere below southern New Zealand and western Antarctica is essentially homogeneous over a scale of hundreds of kilometres." Royal Society of New Zealand bulletin 23:344-365.

Taieri Lake lies near Waipiata in the Maniototo district.

== Trout fishing ==
There is fishing at Rutherford's Dam, above Waipiata, on private property. This is an irrigation dam built to collect and store water during the summer. All fishing methods may be used at all sites. Fishing

== Farming - Sheep breeding competition winners ==
The NZ Sheepbreeders Association runs the annual Rabobank New Zealand Ewe Hogget Competition. Local winners of the 'other breed' categories in 2004 were: John & Sally Andrews, Waipiata, Ranfurly. Breed - Composite. RAS

== Water quality ==
Register of Community Drinking-Water Supplies in New Zealand; » Waipiata Tavern Bore.

== People ==
- World War 1 roll of honour. Corporal William Henry URE, on October 4, 1917, number 28242, WIR, KIA in France. Buried at Tyne Cot Cemetery, Belgium. He was the son of Mr and Mrs William H. Ure, of Waipiata.

== Location map ==
- Waipiata location map

For Waipiata topographic info see Map 260 H42 Waipiata - LINZ

== Waipiata Community Development Committee ==
The local community produced a Community Plan in 2008 setting development priorities for the area. The community sees roading, local history and water supplies as key community issues. A regular newsletter is produced which can be viewed at the community webpage. .

== Education ==
The local children are educated at Maniototo Area School in the nearby town of Ranfurly. Children catch a free school bus to the school, which caters for students aged 5–18.

Waipiata Children with the Waipiata Man

== Climate ==
Climate data for Waipiata (1924–1966)
Month	Jan	Feb	Mar	Apr	May	Jun	Jul	Aug	Sep	Oct	Nov	Dec	Year
Record high °C (°F)	33.3 (91.9)	31.6 (88.9)	30.2 (86.4)	25.7 (78.3)	21.4 (70.5)	19.2 (66.6)	16.6 (61.9)	19.9 (67.8)	21.8 (71.2)	26.4 (79.5)	29.9 (85.8)	31.7 (89.1)	33.3 (91.9)
Mean maximum °C (°F)	28.7 (83.7)	28.3 (82.9)	26.2 (79.2)	22.2 (72.0)	17.3 (63.1)	14.2 (57.6)	12.8 (55.0)	15.2 (59.4)	18.5 (65.3)	21.9 (71.4)	24.5 (76.1)	26.9 (80.4)	29.7 (85.5)
Mean daily maximum °C (°F)	20.7 (69.3)	20.7 (69.3)	18.5 (65.3)	15.3 (59.5)	10.7 (51.3)	7.2 (45.0)	6.6 (43.9)	9.1 (48.4)	12.5 (54.5)	15.1 (59.2)	17.0 (62.6)	19.0 (66.2)	14.4 (57.9)
Daily mean °C (°F)	14.4 (57.9)	14.3 (57.7)	12.3 (54.1)	9.5 (49.1)	5.6 (42.1)	2.9 (37.2)	2.2 (36.0)	4.2 (39.6)	7.0 (44.6)	9.5 (49.1)	11.2 (52.2)	13.1 (55.6)	8.9 (47.9)
Mean daily minimum °C (°F)	8.1 (46.6)	7.9 (46.2)	6.1 (43.0)	3.9 (39.0)	0.5 (32.9)	−1.5 (29.3)	−2.2 (28.0)	−0.7 (30.7)	1.5 (34.7)	3.8 (38.8)	5.3 (41.5)	7.2 (45.0)	3.3 (38.0)
Mean minimum °C (°F)	2.1 (35.8)	1.5 (34.7)	0.1 (32.2)	−1.6 (29.1)	−4.9 (23.2)	−7.3 (18.9)	−8.0 (17.6)	−5.8 (21.6)	−3.8 (25.2)	−2.4 (27.7)	−1.1 (30.0)	0.9 (33.6)	−8.8 (16.2)
Record low °C (°F)	−0.7 (30.7)	−1.7 (28.9)	−3.9 (25.0)	−7.8 (18.0)	−9.4 (15.1)	−11.7 (10.9)	−14.9 (5.2)	−10.7 (12.7)	−6.7 (19.9)	−4.7 (23.5)	−3.9 (25.0)	−1.9 (28.6)	−14.9 (5.2)
Average rainfall mm (inches)	50 (2.0)	37 (1.5)	48 (1.9)	35 (1.4)	35 (1.4)	27 (1.1)	23 (0.9)	23 (0.9)	23 (0.9)	36 (1.4)	44 (1.7)	43 (1.7)	424 (16.8)
Source: Earth Sciences NZ (rainfall 1951–1980)

== See also ==
- Rock and Pillar Range
- Taieri River
- Maniototo
- Otago gold rush
- The Lord of the Rings (film series)
- Manuherikia River
