= Tony Kreft =

- Born: Anthony John Kreft; 27 March 1945 Milton, New Zealand
- Died: 15 September 2023 (aged 78) Dunedin, New Zealand
- Height: 1.86 m (6 ft 1 in)
- Weight: 98 kg (216 lb)
- School: Ranfurly High School

Rugby union career
- Position: Prop
Provincial / State sides
Years	Team	Apps	(Points)
1966–1970	Otago	60	
International career
Years	Team	Apps	(Points)
1968	New Zealand	1	(0)

Anthony John Kreft (27 March 1945 – 15 September 2023) was a New Zealand rugby union player. A prop, Kreft represented Otago at a provincial level, and was a member of the New Zealand national side, the All Blacks, on their 1968 tour of Australia. He played four matches for the All Blacks on that tour, including one international.

Kreft died in Dunedin on 15 September 2023, at the age of 78.
