= Clarks Junction =

Locality in Dunedin City, New Zealand

Coordinates: 45°43′35″S 170°02′50″E

Clarks Junction, also known simply as Clarks, is a locality in the Otago Region of the South Island of New Zealand. It is located at the junction of State Highway 87 and the Old Dunstan Road, approximately halfway between Outram and Middlemarch.

Clarks Junction was an important stop on the trail to the goldfields of Central Otago in the years following the 1860s gold rush. It was named after an early settler who became the settlement's first postmaster in 1867.

Clarks Junction's most notable feature was the local pub, the Clarks Junction Hotel, which closed down in March 2020.

== Clarks Junction Cafe and Bar ==
Clarks Junction Cafe and Bar (previously known as Clarks Junction Hotel) is located at the junction of the two roads. It was a well-known sight for travellers between Dunedin and the Maniototo, because it was for many years painted bright orange, which enabled it to be seen from a great distance. It was built in 1867 and was burnt down and rebuilt in 1930. Gillian and Adrian Bardrick owned the hotel from 1999 to 2019 when they sold it to Tony Bennet and Tania Profit, who renovated the hotel and operated it for a year before closing down due to the 2020 COVID-19 Lockdowns. The hotel was not opened and was sold as a residential property in July 2021.
