= Ichneutica schistella =

Conservation status
- Data Deficit (NZ TCS)

Scientific classification
- Kingdom: Animalia
- Phylum: Arthropoda
- Clade: Pancrustacea
- Class: Insecta
- Order: Lepidoptera
- Superfamily: Noctuoidea
- Family: Noctuidae
- Genus: Ichneutica
- Species: I. schistella

Binomial name
- Ichneutica schistella Hoare, 2019

Species of moth endemic to New Zealand

Ichneutica schistella is a moth of the family Noctuidae. It is endemic to New Zealand and has only been recorded at the Rock and Pillar Range in Central Otago. Adult males are on the wing in December. In 2025 this species was classified as "data deficient" under the New Zealand Threat Classification System.

== Taxonomy ==
This species was first described by Robert Hoare in 2019. The holotype specimen, held at the Otago Museum, is male and was collected in December 1994 by Brian H. Patrick at the Rock and Pillar Range.

== Description ==
This species is dark grey and white in colouration. This colouration has been hypothesised to ensure the moth is camouflaged against lichen or stone habitat. This species can be distinguished from I. cana as it is smaller in size. I. schistella also have distinctive black coloured markings on the edge of its forewings. The male of this species has a wingspan of between 33 and 38mm. As at 2019 the female of this species is unknown.

== Distribution ==
This species is endemic to New Zealand and has only been collected from its type locality the Rock and Pillar Range in Central Otago.

== Life history ==
The life history of this species is unknown.

== Behaviour ==
Adult males of this species are on the wing in December.

== Conservation status ==
In 2025 this species was classified by the New Zealand Department of Conservation as "data deficient" under the New Zealand Threat Classification System. I. schistella is only found in one location.
