= Platypus (submarine) =

New Zealand submarine, built 1873

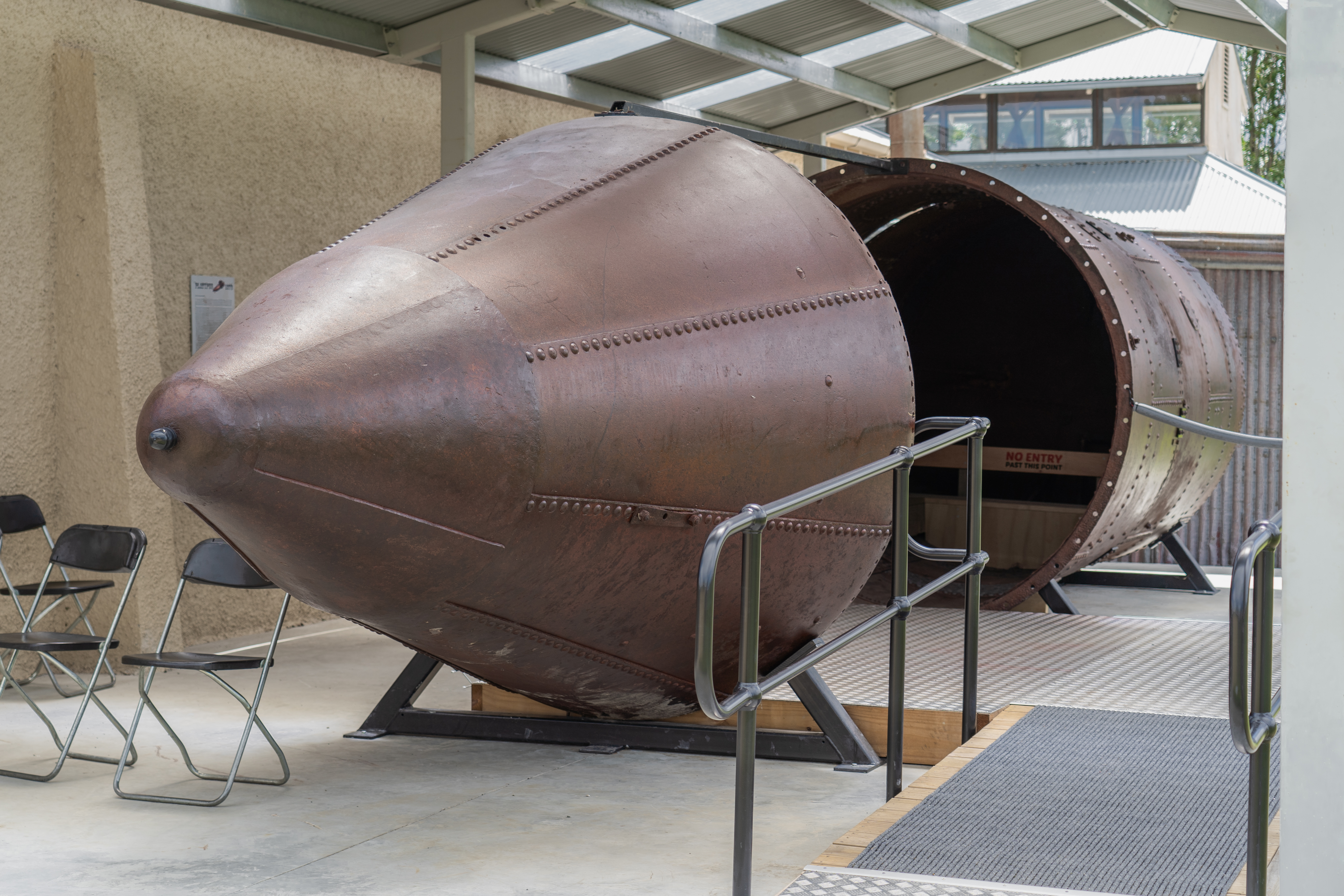
- The remains of the Platypus on display at Middlemarch Museum in Otago
- Type: Submarine
- Material: Iron
- Created: 1873
- Present location: Middlemarch, New Zealand

Platypus was a 10-metre (33 ft) long iron-plate submarine. It was built in 1873 in Dunedin, and is thought to be the only submarine to have been built in New Zealand. It is one of the earliest surviving examples of a submarine in the world. The submarine was built to traverse rivers for the New Zealand Submarine Gold Mining Company Ltd, following the peak of the Otago gold rush.

The remains are now on display in Middlemarch, and in 2019 the Strath Taieri Historical Society received funding to build a covered structure for the submarine and undertake basic conservation work, though the central section of the vessel has not yet been recovered.

== Development ==
Plans for the submarine were designed by Frenchman Leopold Villaine, and along with Australian gold miner R. W. Nutall, the pair brought the plans to Dunedin. Nutall proposed that the submarine could prospect any part of a river for gold, with equipment to blast rocks, remove obstructions, and sluice the river bed. The vessel was designed to support three men working for six hours, at depths of up to 80 feet.

With the support of investors, the New Zealand Submarine Gold Mining Company was formed, and Dunedin iron workers Joseph Sparrow and William Thomas received the tender to build the vessel.

== History ==
The Platypus was launched on 13 December 1873 into Otago Harbour, with initial success. The first trial submersion took place on 30 January 1874 without issue; five men, including a journalist, were submerged inside the vessel for 45 minutes then brought back to the surface.

The following day, a public trial of the submarine was held. The vessel took just under two hours to reach the bottom of the test location, a depth of 13 feet. After remaining submerged for another two hours, the Platypus began its return to the surface, however worsening marine conditions made it too difficult for the submarine to reach the surface and it had to be towed to shore.

A third trial on 4 February 1874 was a success, and the occupants managed to collect material including shells and fishing line from the harbour floor. However, a failure during the following trial required the vessel to be hauled back up the surface. During this test, a note floated to the surface, saying "We are prepared to meet our maker".

Following this, investors lost interest and the submarine was left on the banks of Pelichet Bay. In 1882 the middle section was modified by the owners to be used by McLeod’s Soap Works to hold tallow. The remains of the vessel were eventually removed during the reclamation of the bay to accommodate the New Zealand and South Seas International Exhibition in 1925–1926.
