= Great Moss Swamp =

Coordinates: 45°33′S 169°56′E

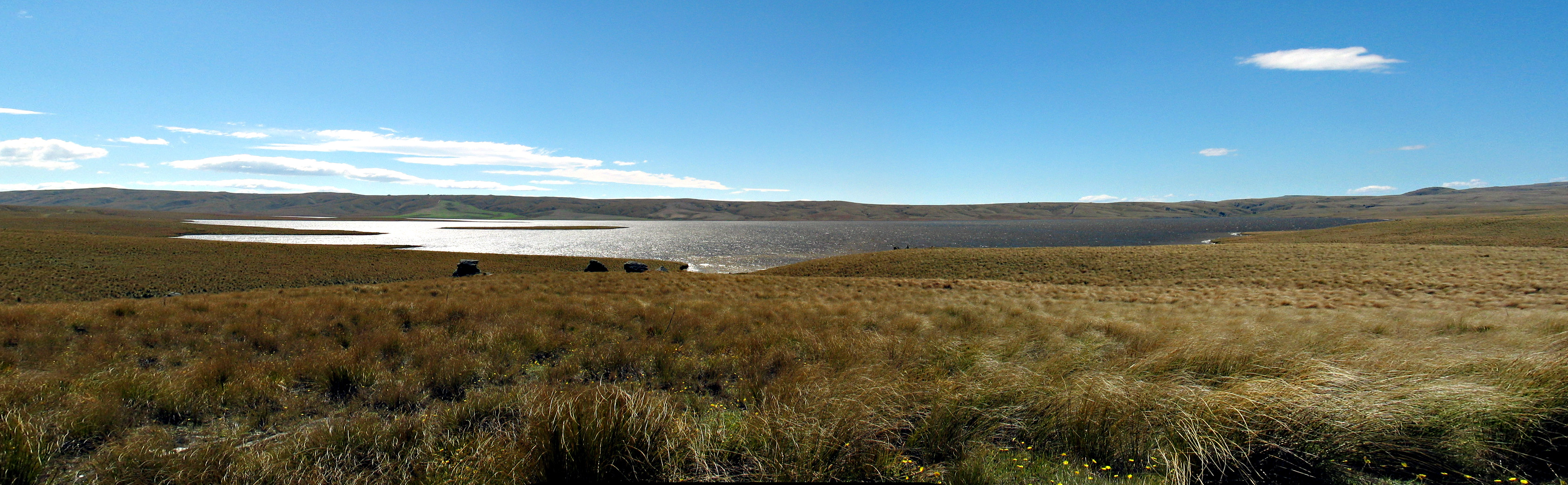
Great Moss Swamp

Location of Great Moss Swamp and named features in the Rock and Pillar Range

The Great Moss Swamp (much of which is also known as the Loganburn Reservoir) is located in Otago, New Zealand, within the Maniototo region. It is located on the Rock and Pillar Range, near the Old Dunstan Road, a former gold mining route, approximately 85 kilometres (53 mi) northwest of Dunedin city centre. This area is classified as a regionally significant wetland.

The Rock and Pillar Range are a horst range, and have a very flat top. Originally a swamp, the upper surface of the Rock and Pillar Range was transformed through the construction of a dam to store water for irrigation and hydroelectricity. This has turned the 'swamp' into a lake as part of the Maniototo Irrigation Scheme. The swamp is drained by the Logan Burn, which feeds into the Taieri River at Paerau. Despite the transformation, there are still significant areas of swampy wetland at the southwestern end of the lake.

The Loganburn Reservoir was completed in 1983, with a capacity of 85,000,000 cubic metres (3.0×10^{9} cubic feet) of water. In 2014, the dam was raised by 80 cm (31 in), which included adding an 80 cm-high spillway and increasing the height of the coping wall along the top of the dam. This modification increased the storage by some 11,500,000 cubic metres (410,000,000 cubic feet). The dam is located on the southern end of the Rock and Pillar Range, about 12 km (7.5 mi) south of Paerau, providing irrigation for 60 farmers and 9,300 ha (23,000 acres), and power generation when water is released for irrigation.
