= Dunstan Trail =

Historic route in Otago, New Zealand

Coordinates: 45°36′00″S 169°54′30″E

Dunstan Trail, also known as Old Dunstan Road, is a historic route in Otago, New Zealand. The road was created during the Central Otago gold rush of the 1860s.

At the time of the road's creation, it was the shortest route from the city of Dunedin to the goldfields around Clyde, or Dunstan as it was then known. Known at the time as "The Mountain Track", it was a dangerous route which claimed numerous lives.

The road begins at Clarks Junction in Strath-Taieri, where it meets SH 87, and extends northwest, crossing between Lammermoor and Rock and Pillar Range before turning north. It climbs to almost 1,000 metres (3,300 ft) before dropping to Paerau (known during the gold rush era as Styx). The trail crosses farmland and subalpine tussock, passing close to Loganburn Reservoir, formerly the Great Moss Swamp.

Beyond Paerau, the trail becomes rougher as it passes above the meanders and oxbow lakes of the upper Taieri River's scroll plain, and then descends towards Poolburn Reservoir, a location during the filming of The Lord of the Rings trilogy of films. From here it turns toward the valley of the Manuherikia River, finishing at Moa Creek.

Today, the trail is a public road, ranging in quality from chip-sealed road to gravel track. Much of the route is only suitable for four-wheel drive vehicles, and the road as a whole is closed in winter, excluding a 9km chip-sealed section at the SH 87 end of the road.
