= Taieri Pet =

Cloud formation in New Zealand

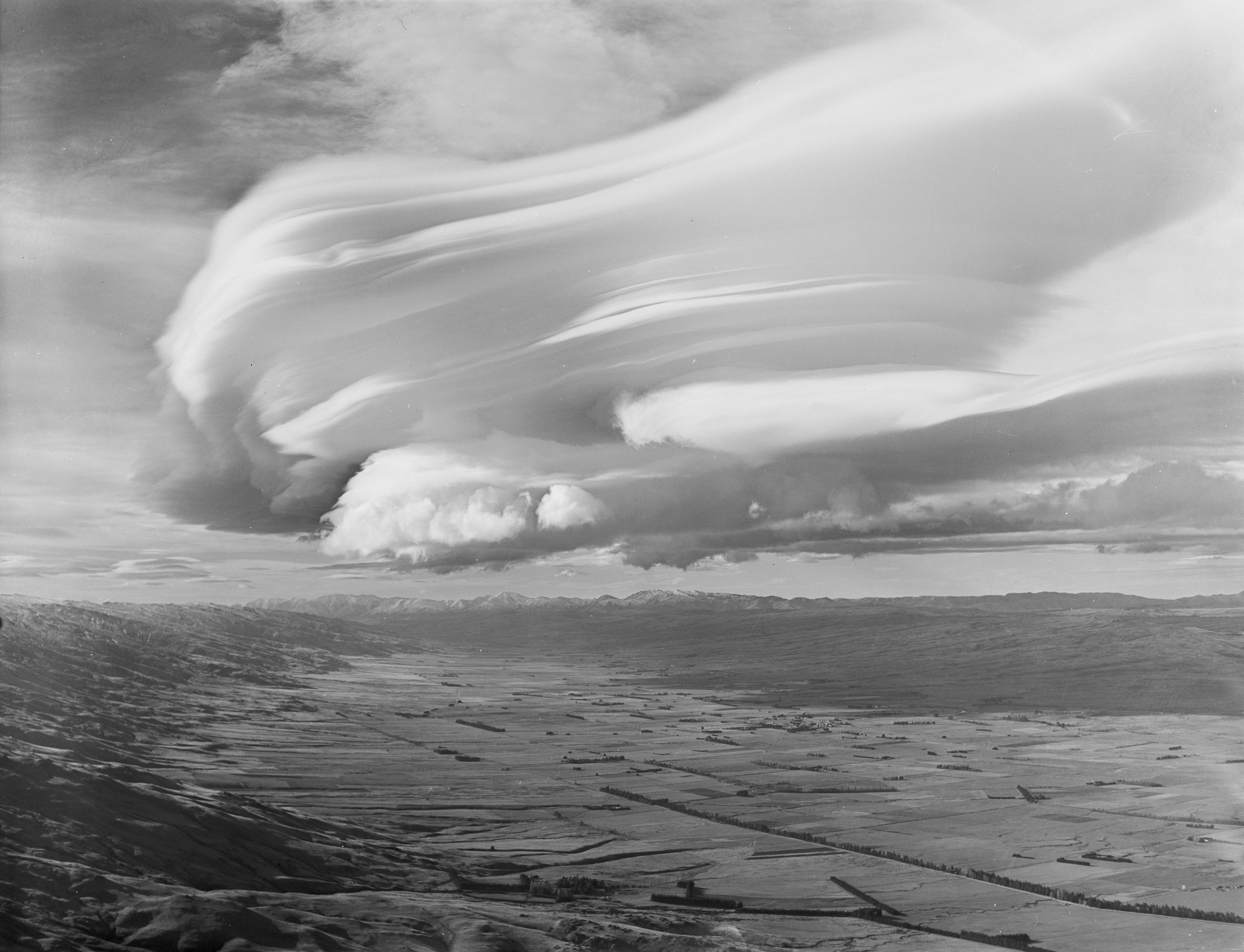
Aerial view of Strath Taieri, near Middlemarch, showing the Taieri Pet

The Taieri Pet is a lenticular cloud formation that occurs in the Strath-Taieri region of Otago in the South Island of New Zealand. The cloud formation is created when north-westerly winds are forced upwards over the Rock and Pillar Range.

The Rock and Pillar Range lies almost perpendicular to the direction of the prevailing north-westerly Foehn wind. The range is steep-sided and has a flat top. Lenticular clouds form when strong northwesterly winds flow up and over the mountain range, creating a standing wave. The air cools as it rises, and the water vapour in the air condenses to form clouds. The Taieri Pet cloud formation can sometimes appear in layers and has been described as a "huge stack of plates" in the sky. The cloud is a common feature in the skies near town of Middlemarch in the Strath-Taieri, a large glacial valley and river plateau in inland Otago.

A Landsat 8 satellite image taken on 7 September 2024 showed the Taieri Pet as an elongated cloud lying parallel to the Rock and Pillar Range and to the north of Middlemarch.

== Etymology ==
The name Taieri Pet given to the cloud formation appears in mentions of the weather in Otago newspapers as early as the 1890s. One report suggests that the name was given because the locals consider the cloud formation as their pet, being found only in their area. The Taieri Pet was also the name given to a local newsletter published by Middlemarch branch of Rural Women New Zealand for almost 40 years from 1982. The final edition was published in June 2021.

Taieri Pet

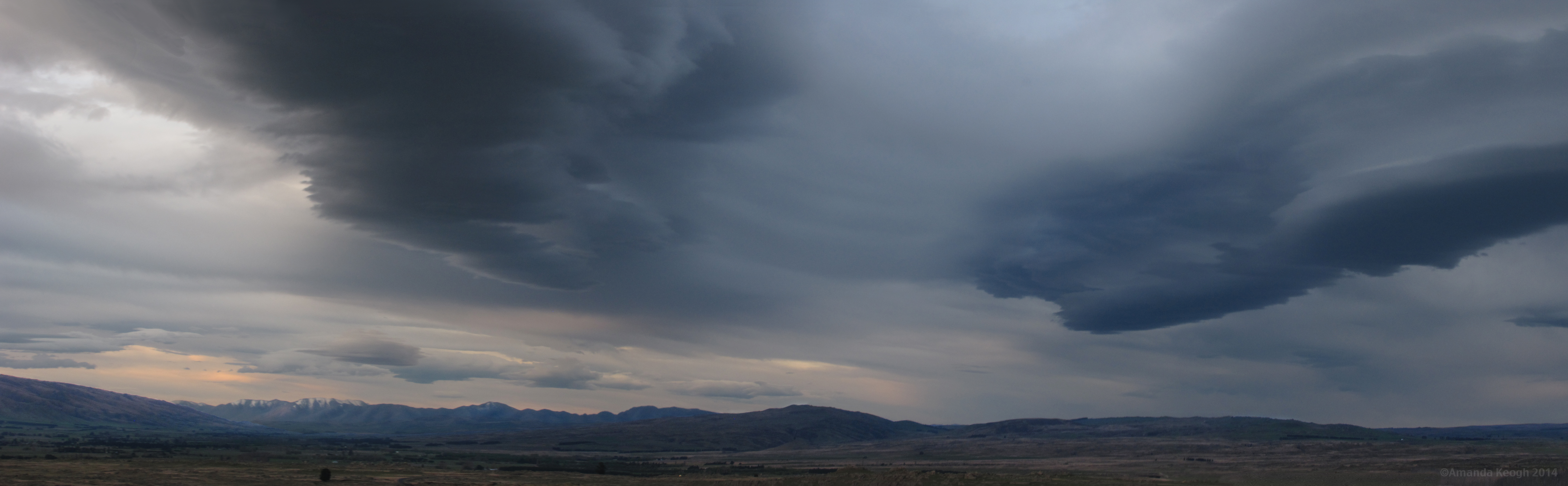
The Taieri Pet, with the Kakanui Ranges in the distance

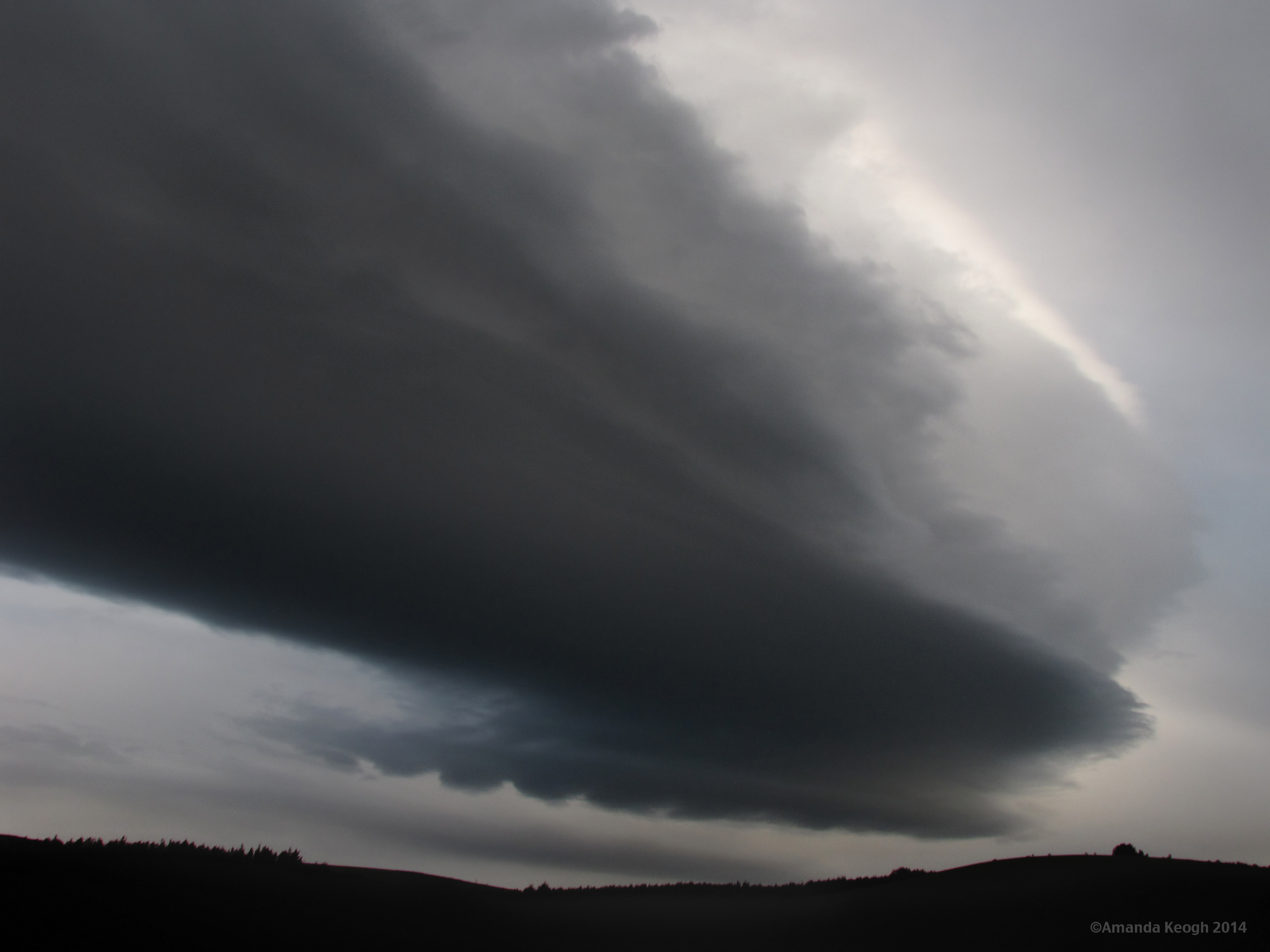
The 'Pet' from Moonlight Road, above Middlemarch

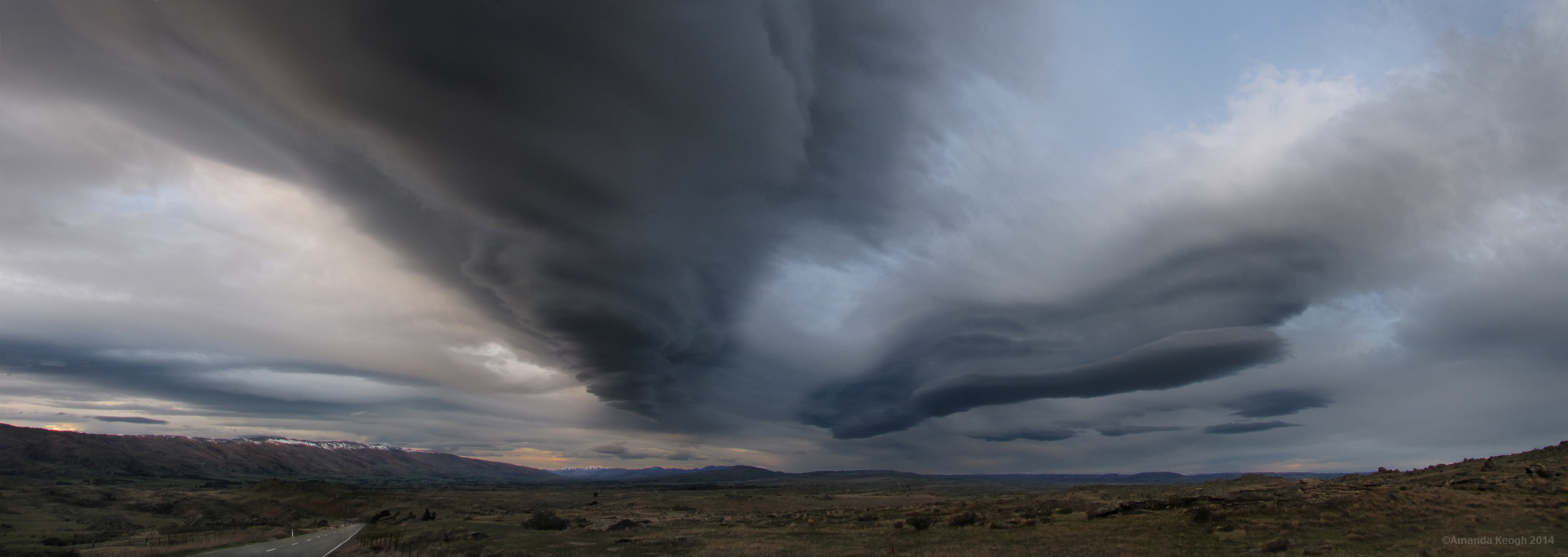
Climbing out of the valley and looking back at the two stacks of The Pet

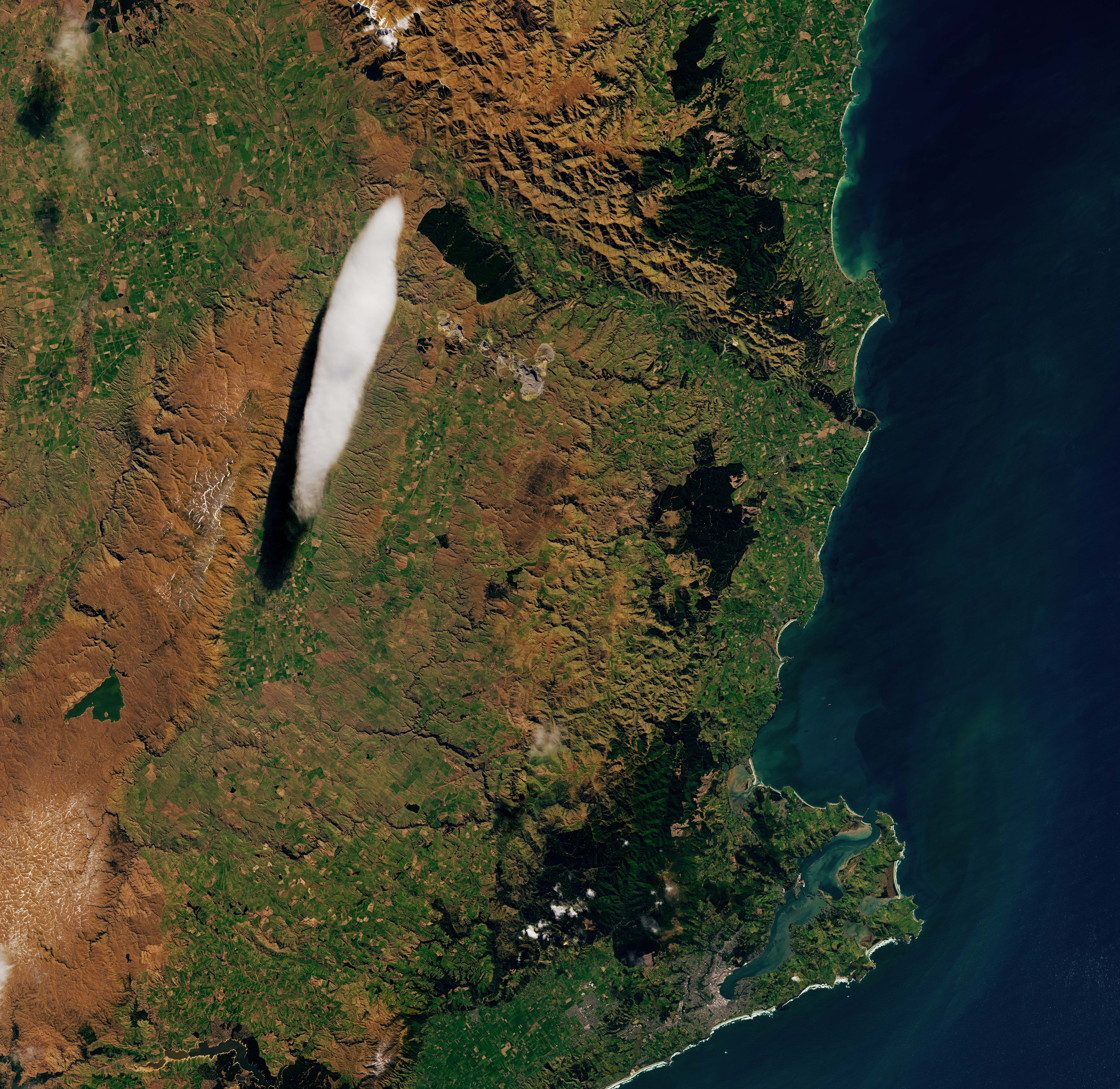
Satellite photo of elongated lenticular cloud over inland Otago

== See also ==
- Nor'west arch, a related effect over the Southern Alps
