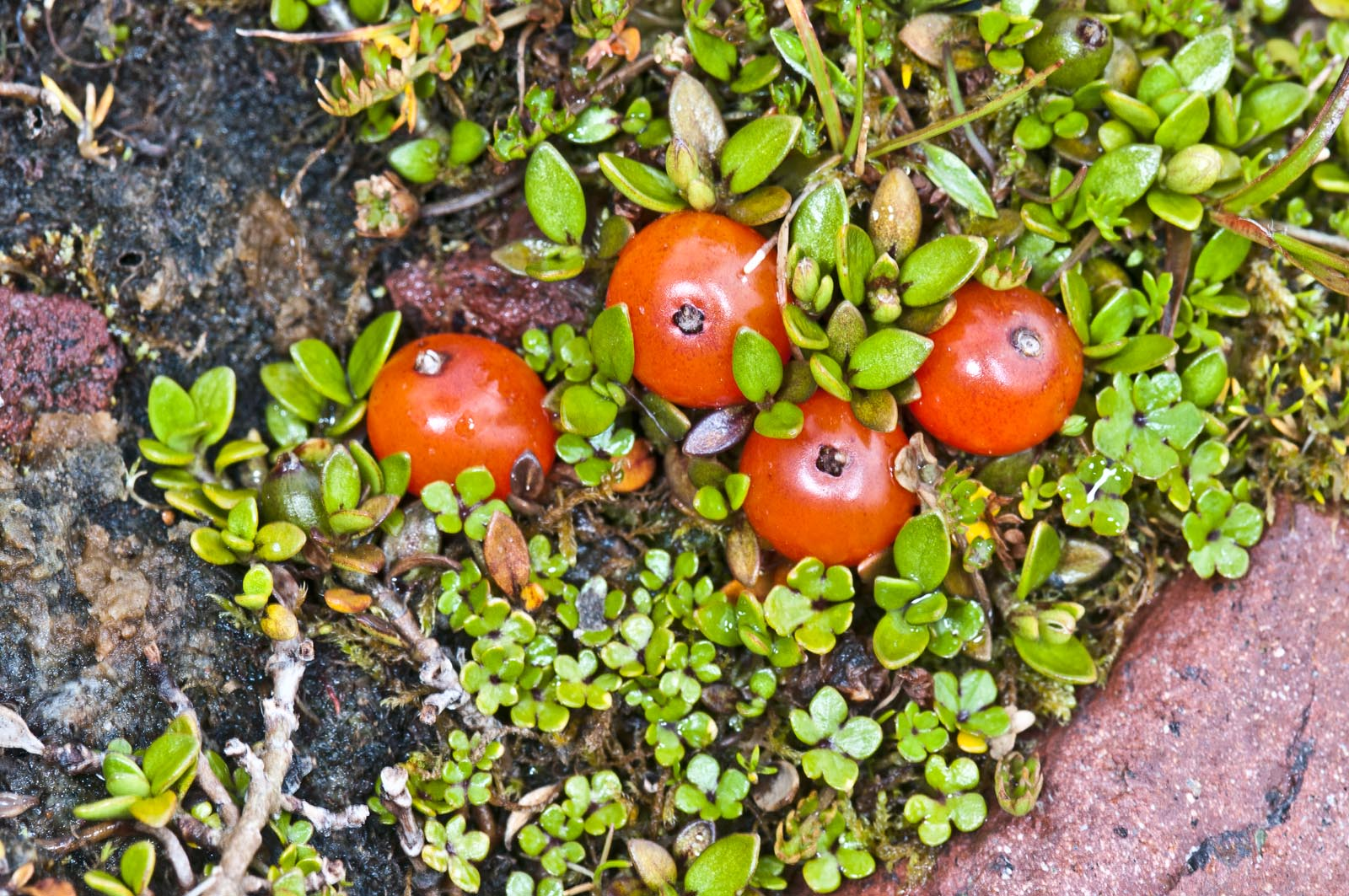
- Coprosma perpusilla subsp. perpusilla

Scientific classification
- Kingdom: Plantae
- Clade: Tracheophytes
- Clade: Angiosperms
- Clade: Eudicots
- Clade: Asterids
- Order: Gentianales
- Family: Rubiaceae
- Genus: Coprosma
- Species: C. perpusilla

Binomial name
- Coprosma perpusilla Colenso, 1890

Subspecies
- C. p. pusilla Colenso; C. p. subantarctica Orchard

= Coprosma perpusilla =

Species of flowering plant

Coprosma perpusilla, commonly known as creeping coprosma, is a species of flowering plant in the family Rubiaceae. It is found in Australia, New Zealand and on some subantarctic islands. The specific epithet comes from the Latin per (very) and pusillus (very small), referring to the growth habit.

== Taxonomy ==
When the Coprosma pumila complex was revised by Orchard in 1986, he resurrected C. perpusilla Colenso from synonymy with C. pumila, recognising two subspecies – the nominate for the plants of New Zealand and Australia, with C. perpusilla ssp. subantarctica erected for the plants on the subantarctic islands.

== Description ==
Creeping coprosma is a prostrate subshrub, with mat-forming stems 300–400 mm long, glabrous, and rooting at the nodes. The small lanceolate to ovate leaves are 4.5–7 mm long and 2–3.5 mm wide, crowded on short shoots. The sessile flowers occur in summer on erect branchlets, and range in colour from greenish white to orange-yellow with red flecks. The fruit is an ovoid drupe 4–6 mm long and yellow-orange to orange-red in colour.

== Distribution and habitat ==
The plant occurs in New Zealand, in Australia where it is native to the states of New South Wales, Victoria and Tasmania, and to the subantarctic islands of Macquarie, Campbell, the Aucklands and the Antipodes. It grows in various habitats in alpine and subalpine regions. On Macquarie Island it has been adversely affected by rabbit grazing.
