= Patearoa =

Coordinates: 45°16′S 170°03′E

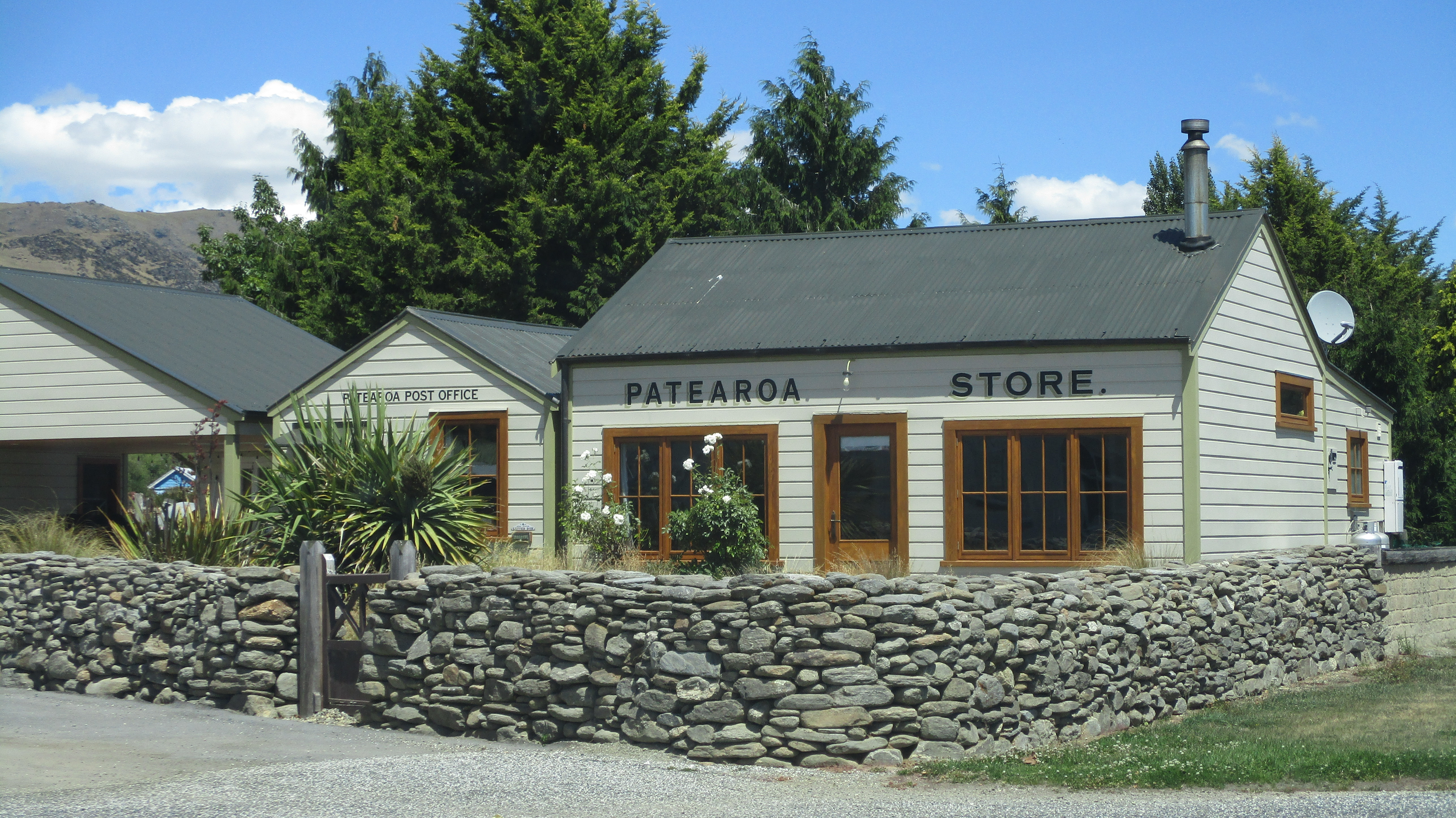
Patearoa Store and Post Office.

Patearoa is a small settlement in inland Otago in New Zealand's South Island. It is located 20 kilometres southwest of Ranfurly, in the Maniototo (the upper valley of the Taieri River) and was originally known as Sowburn. Andrew Buchanan was an early runholder in Patearoa.
