= Middlemarch, New Zealand =

Settlement in the Otago Region of New Zealand

Middlemarch
- Rural settlement
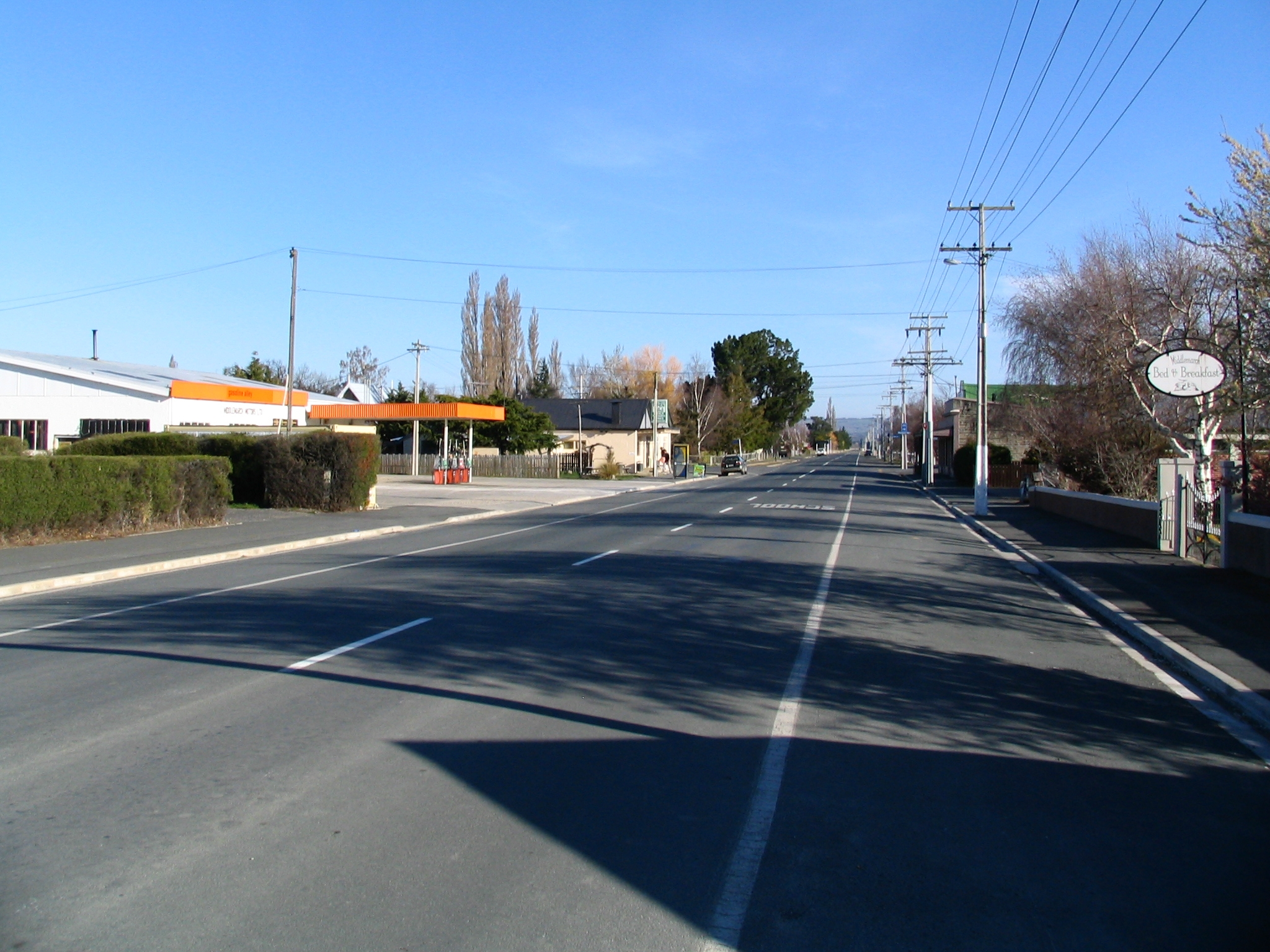
- Looking south along State Highway 87 at Middlemarch
- Interactive map of Middlemarch
- Coordinates: 45°31′S 170°07′E
- Country: New Zealand
- Region: Otago
- District: Dunedin
- Community board: Strath Taieri Community Board
- Electorates: Taieri; Te Tai Tonga (Māori)

Government
  - Territorial authority: Dunedin City Council
  - Regional council: Otago Regional Council
  - Mayor of Dunedin: Sophie Barker
  - Taieri MP: Ingrid Leary
  - Te Tai Tonga MP: Tākuta Ferris

Area
  - Total: 1.05 km^{2} (0.41 sq mi)

Population (June 2025)
  - Total: 150
  - Density: 140/km^{2} (370/sq mi)
- Time zone: UTC+12 (NZST)
  - Summer (DST): UTC+13 (NZDT)
- Postcode: 9597
- Area code: 03
- Local iwi: Ngāi Tahu

Middlemarch is a small town in the Otago region of New Zealand's South Island. It lies at the foot of the Rock and Pillar Range of hills in the broad Strath-Taieri valley, through which flows the middle reaches of the Taieri River. Since local government reorganisation in the late 1980s, Middlemarch and much of the Strath-Taieri has been administered as part of Dunedin city, the centre of which lies some 80 km to the southeast. Middlemarch is part of the Taieri electorate (formerly known as Dunedin South), and is currently represented in parliament by Ingrid Leary. Middlemarch has reticulated sewerage but no reticulated water supply. A description of 1903, that "[T]he summer seasons are warm, but not enervating, and the winters cold, but dry" is still true today.

It is a crucial service town for the local farming community, the terminus of the Taieri Gorge Railway, and the start of the Otago Central Rail Trail.

Several suggestions exist about how the township was named. One is that Mrs Alice Humphreys (née Hawdon, 1848–1934), whose husband Edward Wingfield Humphreys owned and had surveyed for sale sections in this new township, named the town in 1876 after George Eliot's novel Middlemarch: A Study of Provincial Life. Another is that the name is from the now obsolete English term "march" meaning a boundary - in this case a middle area between two rivers. As with many places in and close to the Maniototo area, its name may have been influenced by the Northumberland ancestry of early surveyor John Turnbull Thomson (there is a Middle March region in Northumberland, centred on the town of Otterburn).

== Demographics ==
Middlemarch is described by Statistics New Zealand as a rural settlement. It covers 1.05 km^{2} (0.41 sq mi) and had an estimated population of 150 as of June 2025, with a population density of 143 people per km^{2}. It is part of the much larger Strath Taieri statistical area.

Historical population
Year	Pop.	±% p.a.
2006	165	—
2013	156	−0.80%
2018	153	−0.39%

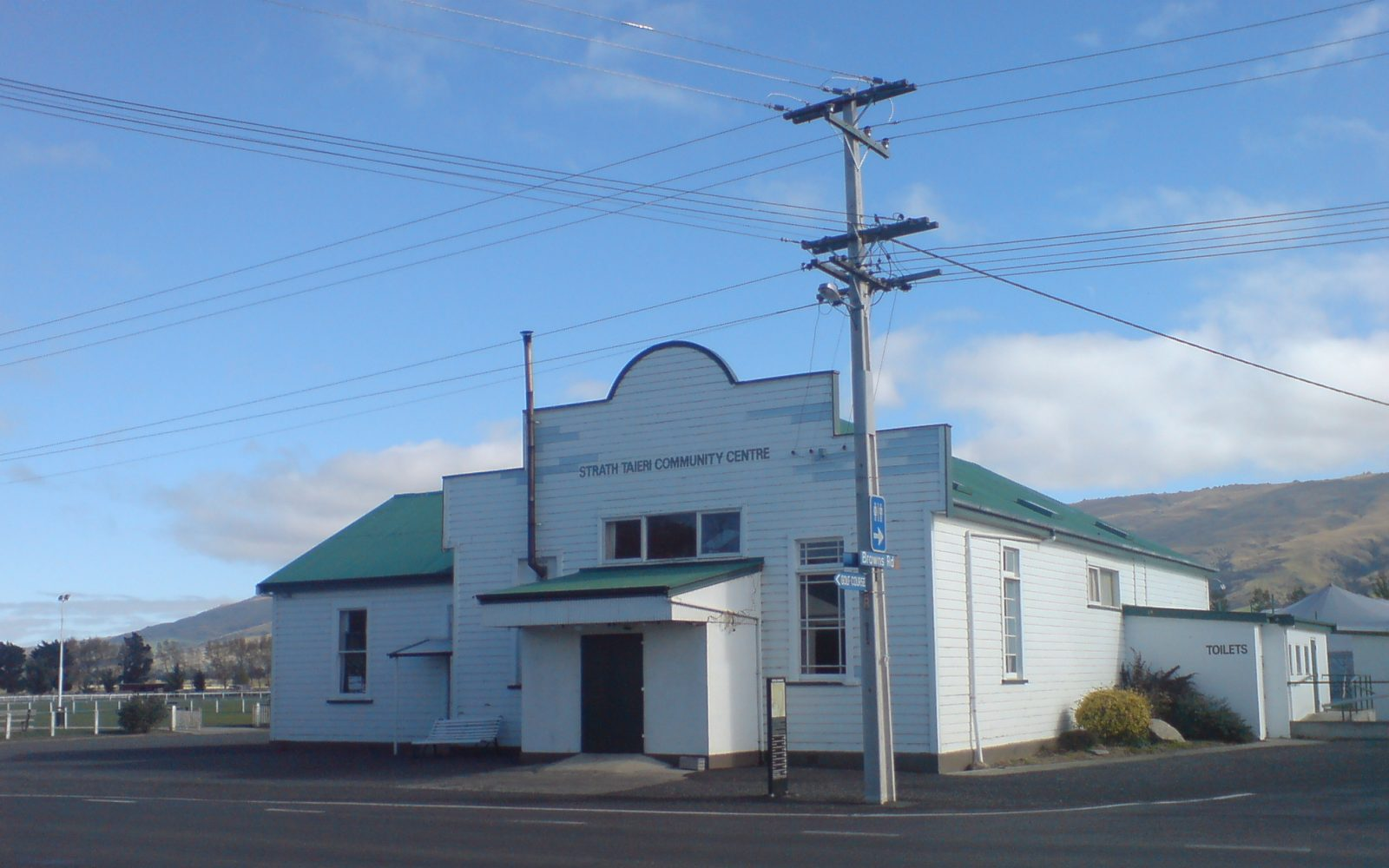
Middlemarch community centre

Middlemarch had a population of 153 at the 2018 New Zealand census, a decrease of 3 people (−1.9%) since the 2013 census, and a decrease of 12 people (−7.3%) since the 2006 census. There were 66 households, comprising 81 males and 72 females, giving a sex ratio of 1.12 males per female. The median age was 50.2 years (compared with 37.4 years nationally), with 21 people (13.7%) aged under 15 years, 18 (11.8%) aged 15 to 29, 90 (58.8%) aged 30 to 64, and 30 (19.6%) aged 65 or older.

Ethnicities were 96.1% European/Pākehā, and 21.6% Māori. People may identify with more than one ethnicity.

Although some people chose not to answer the census's question about religious affiliation, 62.7% had no religion, and 31.4% were Christian.

Of those at least 15 years old, 12 (9.1%) people had a bachelor's or higher degree, and 30 (22.7%) people had no formal qualifications. The median income was $25,200, compared with $31,800 nationally. 15 people (11.4%) earned over $70,000 compared to 17.2% nationally. The employment status of those at least 15 was that 51 (38.6%) people were employed full-time, 21 (15.9%) were part-time, and 6 (4.5%) were unemployed.

== Education ==
Strath Taieri School is a co-educational state full primary school for Year 1 to 8 students, with a roll of 40 students as of July 2026. The school opened in 1880, and was initially a high school. It became a full primary in 1975.

The nearest secondary schools (year 9 to 13) are Maniatoto Area School, 63 km (39 mi) away in Ranfurly, and Taieri College, 64 km (40 mi) away in Mosgiel.

== Museum ==
Middlemarch Museum, located on Aberafon Street, shares the social history of the region.

The museum's collection includes the Platypus, a 10-metre long iron-plate submarine. It was built in 1873 in Dunedin to mine for underwater gold, and is thought to be the only submarine to have been built in New Zealand.

== Climate ==
Climate data for Middlemarch (1991–2020 normals, extremes 2000–present)
Month	Jan	Feb	Mar	Apr	May	Jun	Jul	Aug	Sep	Oct	Nov	Dec	Year
Record high °C (°F)	37.4 (99.3)	35.6 (96.1)	32.6 (90.7)	28.0 (82.4)	25.3 (77.5)	21.1 (70.0)	19.4 (66.9)	21.5 (70.7)	24.7 (76.5)	27.9 (82.2)	31.2 (88.2)	36.0 (96.8)	37.4 (99.3)
Mean maximum °C (°F)	32.1 (89.8)	30.9 (87.6)	29.0 (84.2)	24.6 (76.3)	20.7 (69.3)	17.9 (64.2)	16.6 (61.9)	18.1 (64.6)	22.1 (71.8)	24.7 (76.5)	27.1 (80.8)	29.9 (85.8)	33.6 (92.5)
Mean daily maximum °C (°F)	22.5 (72.5)	22.3 (72.1)	20.6 (69.1)	17.0 (62.6)	12.9 (55.2)	9.8 (49.6)	9.5 (49.1)	11.6 (52.9)	14.7 (58.5)	16.6 (61.9)	18.5 (65.3)	20.9 (69.6)	16.4 (61.5)
Daily mean °C (°F)	15.6 (60.1)	15.2 (59.4)	13.3 (55.9)	10.2 (50.4)	7.0 (44.6)	4.4 (39.9)	3.8 (38.8)	5.7 (42.3)	8.4 (47.1)	10.1 (50.2)	11.9 (53.4)	14.3 (57.7)	10.0 (50.0)
Mean daily minimum °C (°F)	8.6 (47.5)	8.1 (46.6)	6.1 (43.0)	3.4 (38.1)	1.1 (34.0)	−1.1 (30.0)	−1.8 (28.8)	−0.3 (31.5)	2.1 (35.8)	3.6 (38.5)	5.4 (41.7)	7.7 (45.9)	3.6 (38.4)
Mean minimum °C (°F)	1.8 (35.2)	1.8 (35.2)	−1.1 (30.0)	−3.5 (25.7)	−5.8 (21.6)	−7.5 (18.5)	−8.0 (17.6)	−6.1 (21.0)	−4.9 (23.2)	−3.4 (25.9)	−1.1 (30.0)	0.8 (33.4)	−8.5 (16.7)
Record low °C (°F)	−2.1 (28.2)	−1.4 (29.5)	−4.1 (24.6)	−5.6 (21.9)	−10.1 (13.8)	−12.3 (9.9)	−10.6 (12.9)	−8.6 (16.5)	−8.0 (17.6)	−5.7 (21.7)	−4.6 (23.7)	−2.1 (28.2)	−12.3 (9.9)
Average rainfall mm (inches)	90.1 (3.55)	70.2 (2.76)	62.8 (2.47)	65.0 (2.56)	69.8 (2.75)	57.3 (2.26)	53.5 (2.11)	53.1 (2.09)	45.9 (1.81)	73.8 (2.91)	75.2 (2.96)	76.7 (3.02)	793.4 (31.25)
Mean monthly sunshine hours	184.1	164.6	162.2	137.5	114.9	109.4	124.3	131.6	160.1	173.6	179.3	175.2	1,816.8
Source: NIWA

The Taieri Pet is a lenticular cloud formation that occurs in the Strath-Taieri region. The cloud formation is created when north-westerly winds are forced upward over the Rock and Pillar Range. The cloud is a common feature in the skies near Middlemarch.
