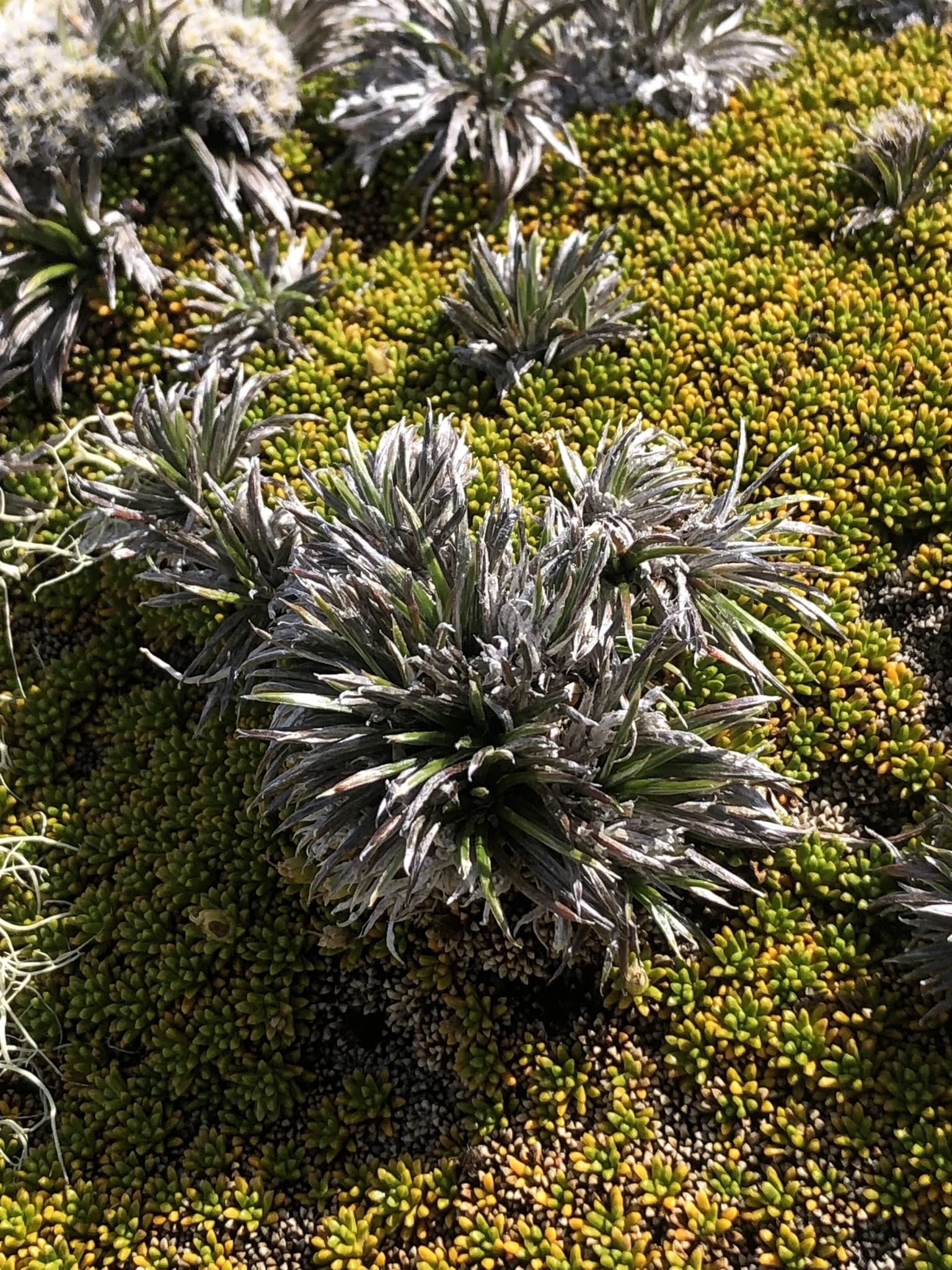
- Celmisia laricifolia in Nelson Lakes National Park

Conservation status
- Not Threatened (NZ TCS)

Scientific classification
- Kingdom: Plantae
- Clade: Tracheophytes
- Clade: Angiosperms
- Clade: Eudicots
- Clade: Asterids
- Order: Asterales
- Family: Asteraceae
- Genus: Celmisia
- Species: C. laricifolia

Binomial name
- Celmisia laricifolia Hook.f.

= Celmisia laricifolia =

Species of flowering plant

Celmisia laricifolia, or the needle-leaved mountain daisy, is a species of flower that is endemic to New Zealand.

== Description ==
The leaves are thin.

== Distribution and habitat ==
Celmisia laricifolia is known only in the South Island of New Zealand, from Nelson south. It grows in mountainous environments, as high in elevation as the subalpine zone. It is often found on poorly-drained areas, near mires or fellfields.

== Etymology ==
Laricifolia comes from the Latin for Larix, or Larch, and folia, for leaf.

== Taxonomy ==
This species was first described in 1855 by Joseph Dalton Hooker.
