= Maniototo Area School =

School in Ranfurly, Central Otago, New Zealand

Coordinates: 45.1252°S 170.0993°E

- Maniototo Area School Crest

Location
- 15 Caulfeild Street; Ranfurly, Central Otago; New Zealand

Information
- School type: Area school
- Motto: By learning we live
- Established: 1879
- Ministry of Education Institution no.: 370
- Chairperson: Sarah Paterson
- Principal: Melissa Bell
- Grades: Year 1 – Year 13
- Enrolment: 136 (July 2026)
- Socio-economic decile: 8P
- Website: http://www.maniototo.school.nz

Maniototo Area School is an area school in Ranfurly, Central Otago, New Zealand, serving students aged 5–18. Founded in 1879, it has 136 students as of July 2026. The school has a strong sporting tradition and an academic programme bolstered by video conferencing lessons and the OtagoNet project.

It is located near a winter sports centre and the Otago Central Rail Trail.

== Enrolment ==
As of July 2026, the school has roll of 136 students, of which 35 (25.7%) identify as Māori.

As of 2026, the school has an Equity Index of 470, placing it amongst schools whose students have above average socioeconomic barriers to achievement (roughly equivalent to deciles 5 and 6 under the former socio-economic decile system).

== Notable alumni ==
- Sean Becker – curler
- Tania Murray – high jumper and triple jumper
- Warren Dobson – curler
- Andrew Hore – rugby union player
- Tony Kreft – rugby union player
- Peter Petherick – cricketer
