= Scroll plain =

A scroll plain occurs where a river meanders across an area with a very low gradient, usually with a fairly continuous discharge. As the river migrates laterally over time, it leaves behind a sequence of curved ridges and swales, known as meander scrolls or scroll bars, and collectively as ridge and swale topography, on the inside of former bends, formed by successive deposition on the point bar as the channel shifts. These features record the historical migration path of the channel across the floodplain.

In addition to meander scrolls, scroll plains are characterised by numerous oxbow lakes, formed when meander loops are cut off as the river straightens its course, and by abandoned channel segments in various stages of infilling. Scroll plain topography is common along low-gradient alluvial rivers and is frequently visible in aerial or satellite imagery as a pattern of concentric arcs paralleling the current channel.

Because scroll plains often contain wetlands, oxbow lakes, and diverse riparian habitat, some are protected for conservation purposes.

== See also ==
- Strath
