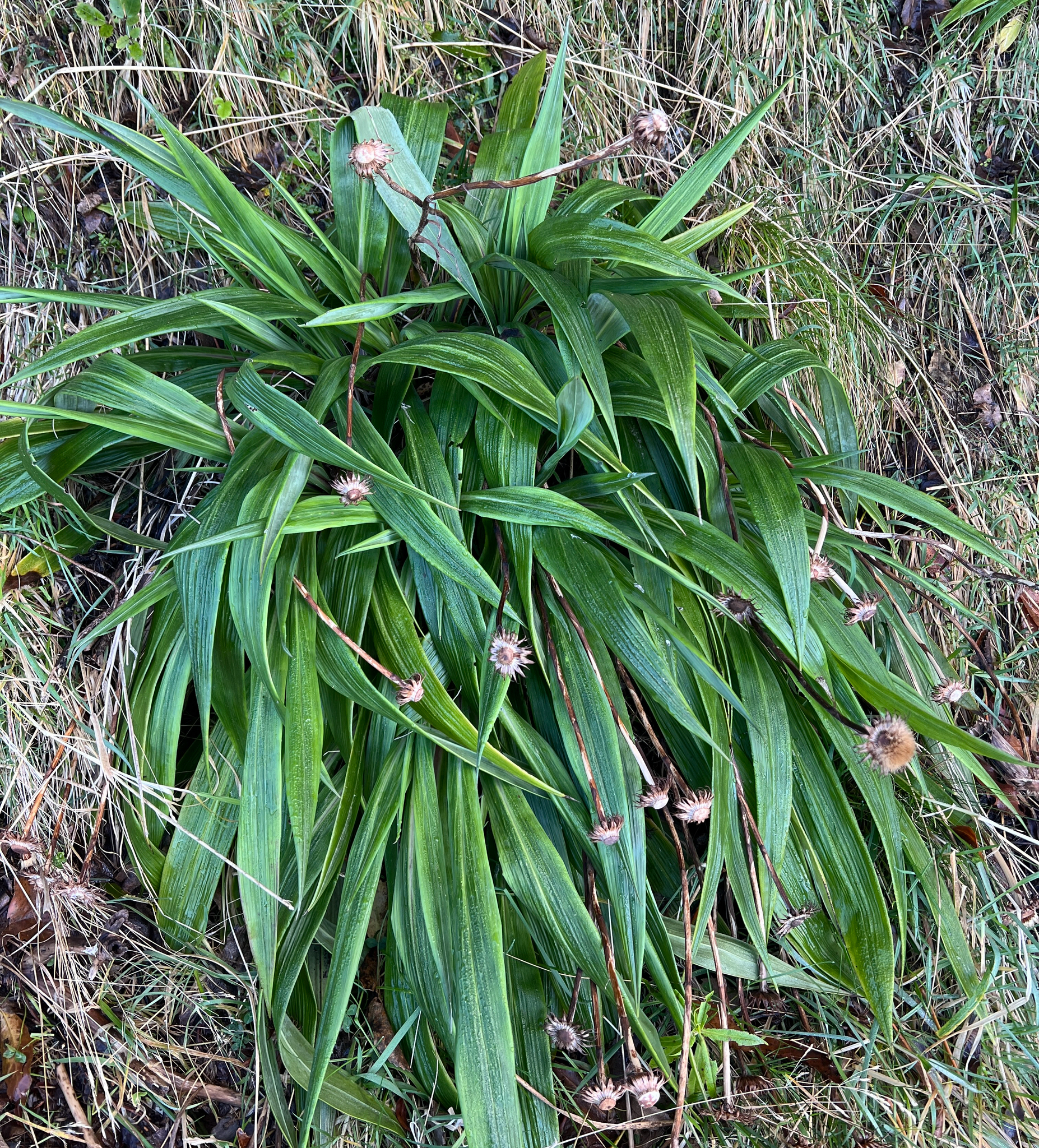
- Celmisia mackaui at Ellangowan Scenic Reserve

Conservation status
- Nationally Endangered (NZ TCS)

Scientific classification
- Kingdom: Plantae
- Clade: Tracheophytes
- Clade: Angiosperms
- Clade: Eudicots
- Clade: Asterids
- Order: Asterales
- Family: Asteraceae
- Genus: Celmisia
- Species: C. mackaui

Binomial name
- Celmisia mackaui Raoul, 1846

Synonyms
- C. coriacea Raoul

= Celmisia mackaui =

Species of flowering plant

Celmisia mackaui, commonly known as the Akaroa daisy or Banks Peninsula daisy, is a species of flowering plant in the mountain daisy genus Celmisia which is endemic to Banks Peninsula, New Zealand. It was first collected near Akaroa in 1843 by French naval surgeon and botanist Étienne Raoul, who named it after Minister of the French Navy Ange René Armand de Mackau. Its natural range is the south-eastern corner of the peninsula, and its small and declining population means it is classed as nationally endangered.

== Description ==
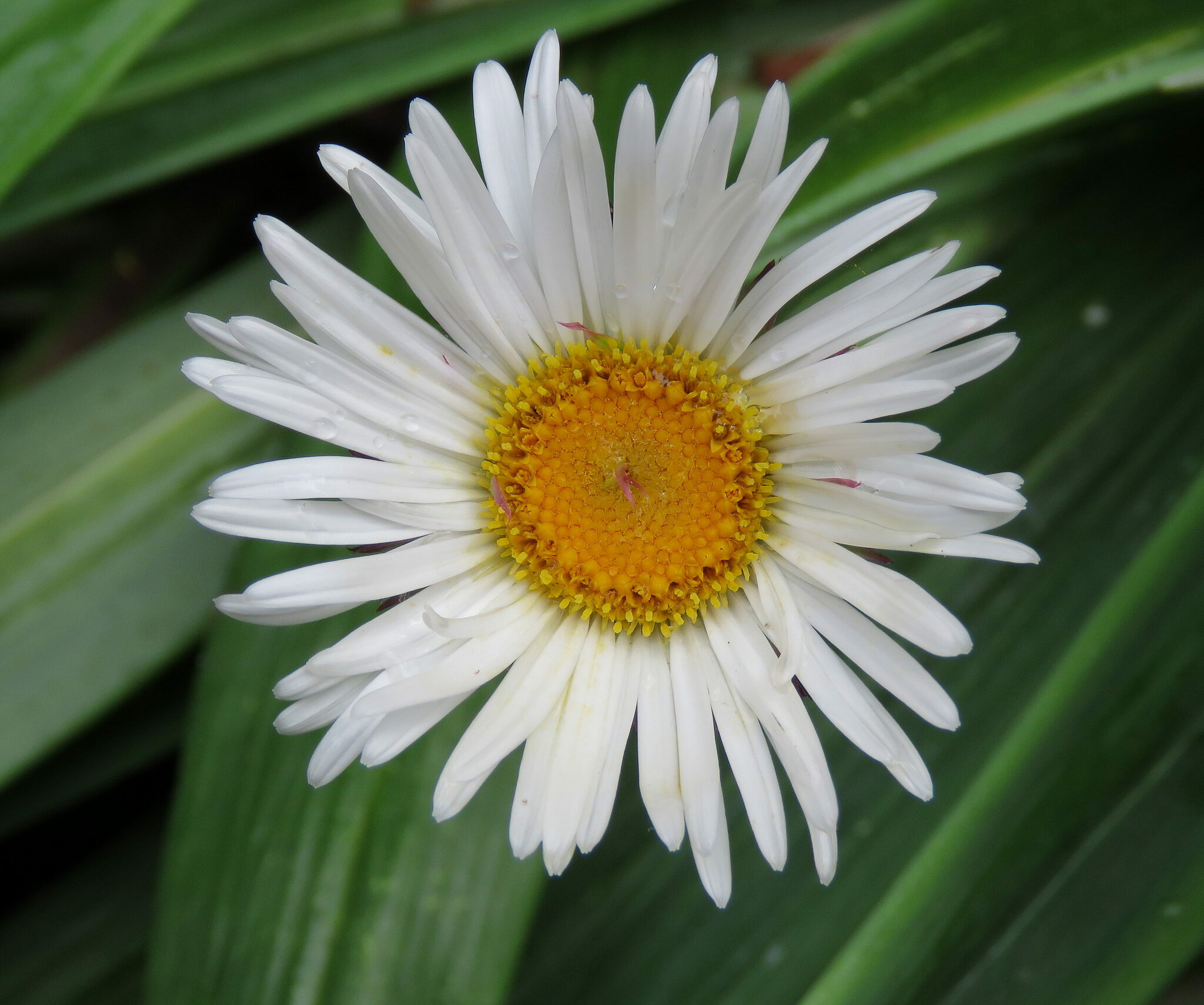
Flower

Celmisia mackaui takes the form of a clump of large drooping sword-shaped leaves, 30–50 cm (12–20 in) long, and 5–6 cm (2.0–2.4 in) wide, narrowing at the base to a leaf stalk usually tinged with purple. The leaves are bright green above and paler below with obvious veins, and are glabrous, lacking the felted hairs of most other Celmisia species. The plant grows as loose collection of rosettes along a creeping rhizome, with rings of dead leaves around each base. It is unlikely to be mistaken for the only other Celmisia known from Banks Peninsula, pekapeka / C. gracilenta, a much smaller plant with narrow leaves bearing hairs underneath.

The prolific flowers are 5–6 cm (2.0–2.4 in) across, pale violet in bud, white and tinged with purple as they age, with orange-yellow centres composed of around 200 florets that darken eventually to brown. The flowers are supported by purple-tipped bracts on a stalk 50–60 cm (20–24 in) tall. Flowering takes place around January to March, and in February to June pale brown fluffly seeds (achenes) are dispersed by wind. The species has a chromosome number n=54.

== Distribution and habitat ==
This species is localised to Banks Peninsula, on the South Island of New Zealand, and even on the Peninsula is restricted to a native range just 12 km (7.5 mi) by 12 km on the south-eastern part, east of Akaroa and south of Takamatua. All known plants in the wild are found only in this area, although there is an 1895 record from Mount Herbert to the north-west, and a single 1899 record from Mount Fyffe in the Seaward Kaikōura Range; neither have been confirmed.

C. mackaui is found from the coast to hilltops 600 metres (2,000 ft) above sea level, and prefers south-facing shady banks, wet cliff faces, waterfalls, and damp rock outcrops, though it can also be found in moist ground or seepages associated with snow tussock or harakeke. It is more common on steeper ground out of reach of grazing livestock.

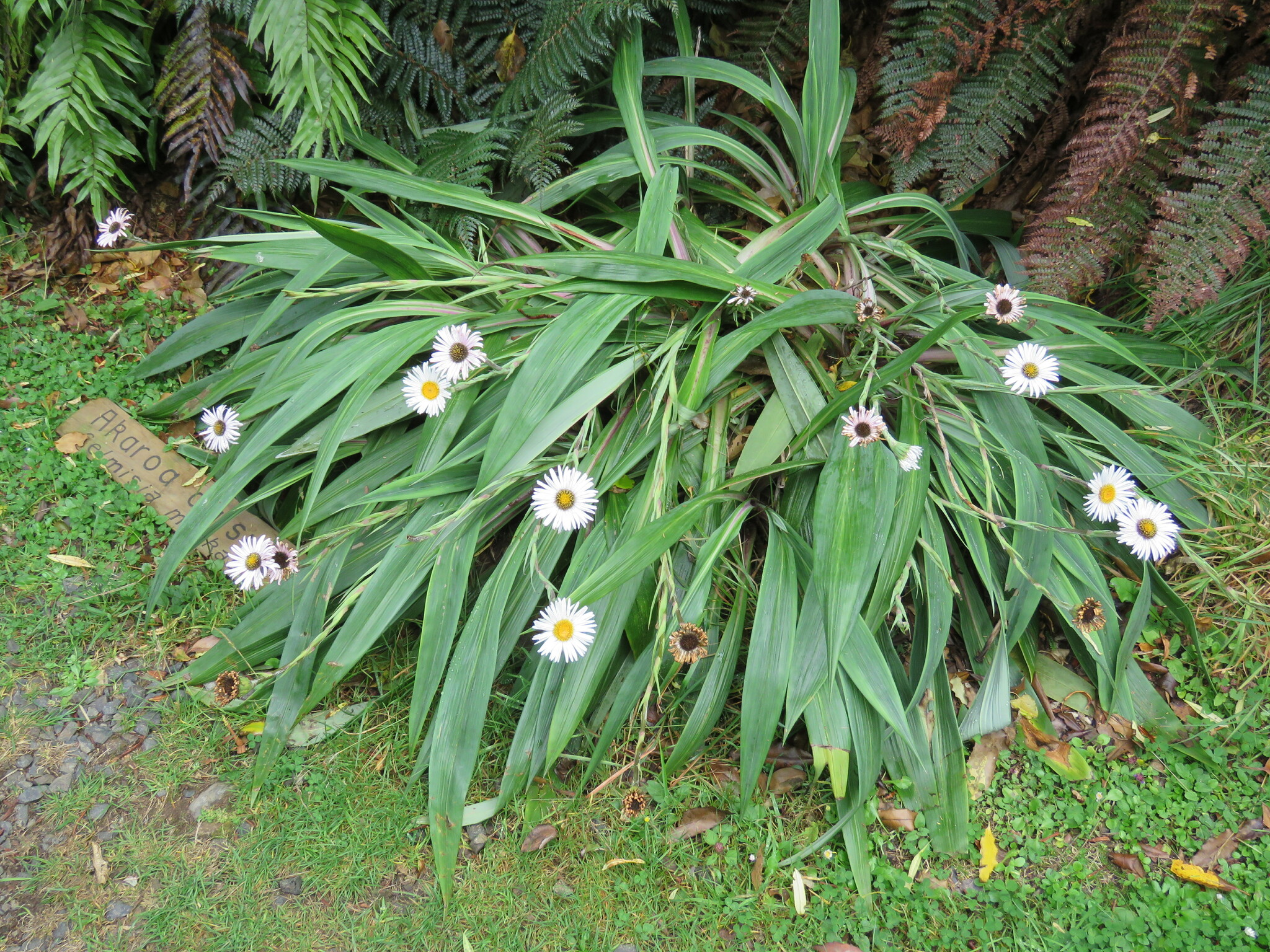
In flower, March 2024 at Hinewai Reserve

== Taxonomy ==
The first European to collect this species was Étienne Raoul, who arrived in Akaroa on 15 August 1840 as surgeon-naturalist on the Aube and was based there for the next two and a half years. The lectotype and an isotype, dated 1843, are held in Paris, and isotypes in Geneva and Kew. After his return to France he published Choix de Plantes de la Nouvelle-Zélande ("Selected Plants of New Zealand") in 1846, in which he described Celmisia mackaui, one of 26 Banks Peninsula species new to science.

In his 1984 review of Celmisia, David Given placed C. mackaui in the "herbaceous" subgenus Pelliculatae, section Petiolatae, along with C. cordatifolia, C. hookeri, C. spectabilis, C. traversii, and C. verbascifolia.

== Etymology ==
Raoul named C. mackaui after Ange René Armand, baron de Mackau, at that time Minister of the French Navy, dedicating the "this superb Compositae" to Mackau for his role in commissioning Choix de Plantes.

== Conservation ==
Until 2018 Celmisia mackaui was classed as "At Risk: Naturally Uncommon" by the Department of Conservation's New Zealand Threat Classification System. After an expansion in its range following the logging and burning of most of Banks Peninsula's native bush, some populations of this daisy are now threatened by the regrowth of forest on abandoned farmland. In the 2023 DOC review of vascular plants its status had worsened to "Threatened: Nationally Endangered", a consequence of its small population size, small home range, lack of recruitment, and observed decline.

C. mackaui grows well from fresh seed, and is available from some commercial nurseries. It is widely cultivated and grows well in shaded, moist conditions.
