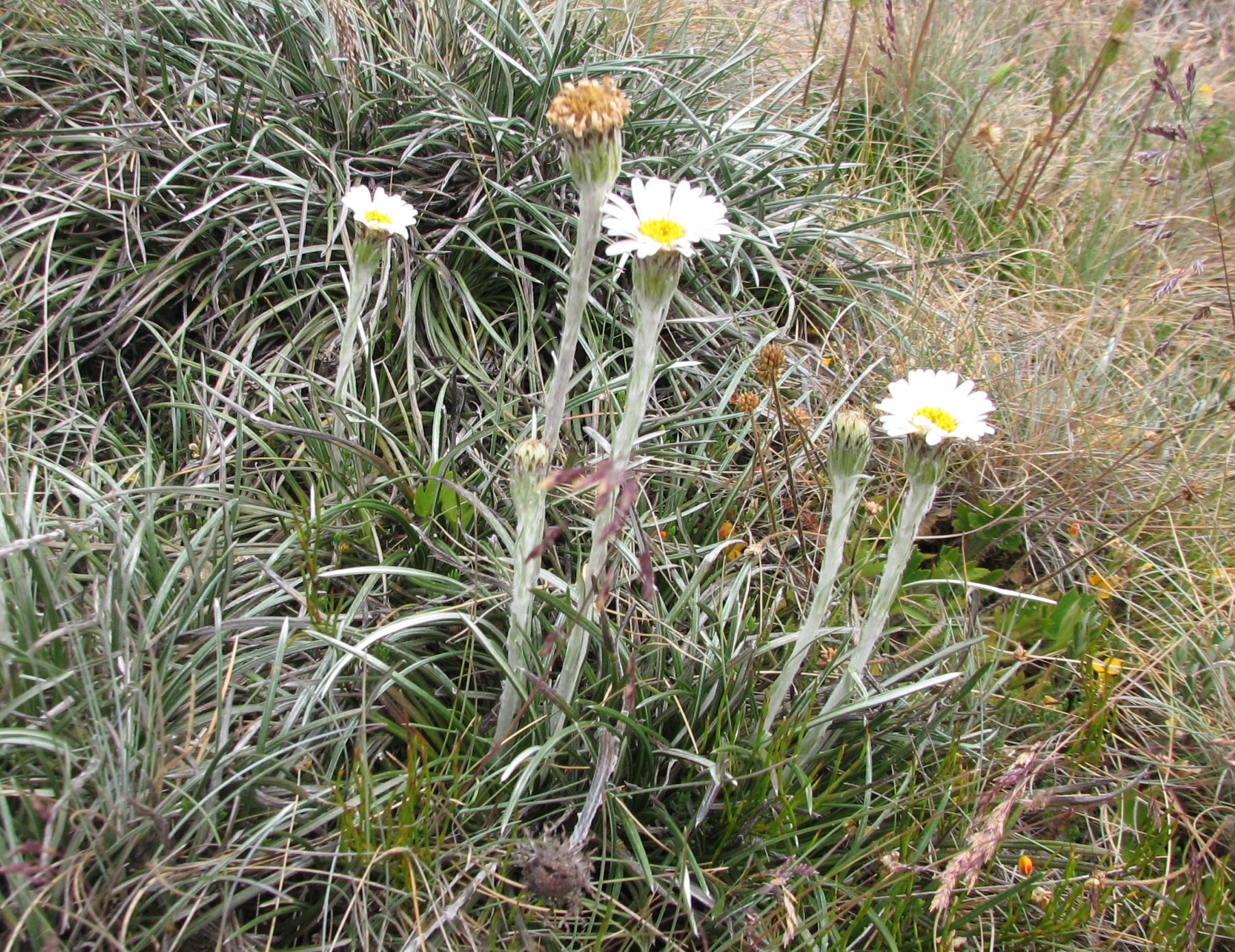
- Celmisia pugioniformis Alpine National Park, Victoria

Scientific classification
- Kingdom: Plantae
- Clade: Tracheophytes
- Clade: Angiosperms
- Clade: Eudicots
- Clade: Asterids
- Order: Asterales
- Family: Asteraceae
- Genus: Celmisia
- Species: C. pugioniformis

Binomial name
- Celmisia pugioniformis M.Gray & Given

Synonyms
- Celmisia sp. C sensu Brown

= Celmisia pugioniformis =

Species of flowering plant

Celmisia pugioniformis, commonly known as slender snow-daisy, is a species of perennial herb in the family Asteraceae. It is native to south-eastern Australia. Leaves are 10 to 20 cm long and 2 to 6 mm wide, with an olive green or grey green upper surface. The daisy-like flowerheads, which are 6 to 8 cm in diameter, appear between December and February in the species native range. The species was formally described in 1992 in the Flora of New South Wales. Prior to 1992, plants had been included under the name Celmisia asteliifolia.

The species occurs in heaths, herbfields and bogs in alpine and subalpine areas in New South Wales and Victoria. Associated species include Eucalyptus niphophila, Olearia phlogopappa, Acrothamnus hookeri, Hovea sp. and Poa sp.
