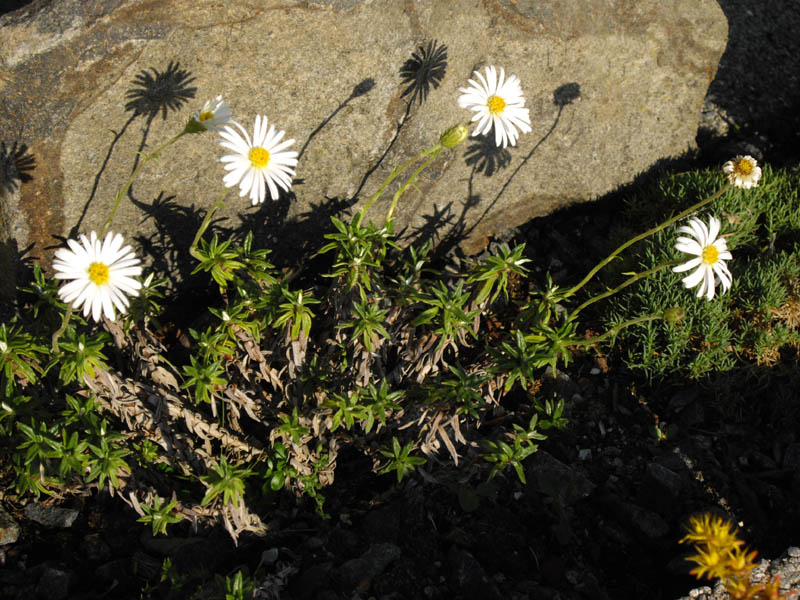

Scientific classification
- Kingdom: Plantae
- Clade: Tracheophytes
- Clade: Angiosperms
- Clade: Eudicots
- Clade: Asterids
- Order: Asterales
- Family: Asteraceae
- Genus: Celmisia
- Species: C. walkeri

Binomial name
- Celmisia walkeri Kirk

= Celmisia walkeri =

Species of flowering plant

Celmisia walkeri, also known as Celmisia webbiana, is a sub-shrub in the genus Celmisia with spreading, semi- decumbent, woody stems and terminal rosettes of linear-oblong gray-green leaves. These leaves are about 2 inches (51 mm) long. In early summer, white-rayed flowerheads, up to 1.5 in (38 mm) wide with yellowish white disk florets appear. The stems of this plant up to 12 in (300 mm) tall, making it classified as a moderately high plant. The plant typically spreads about 12 in (300 mm) as well.

Celmisia walkeri is in the hardiness zone 9–10, and can only live in heat zones 9 and 10. Celmisia is a very tropical and heat tolerant plant.

Celmisia walkeri is native to New Zealand, hence its common name is a New Zealand daisy.
