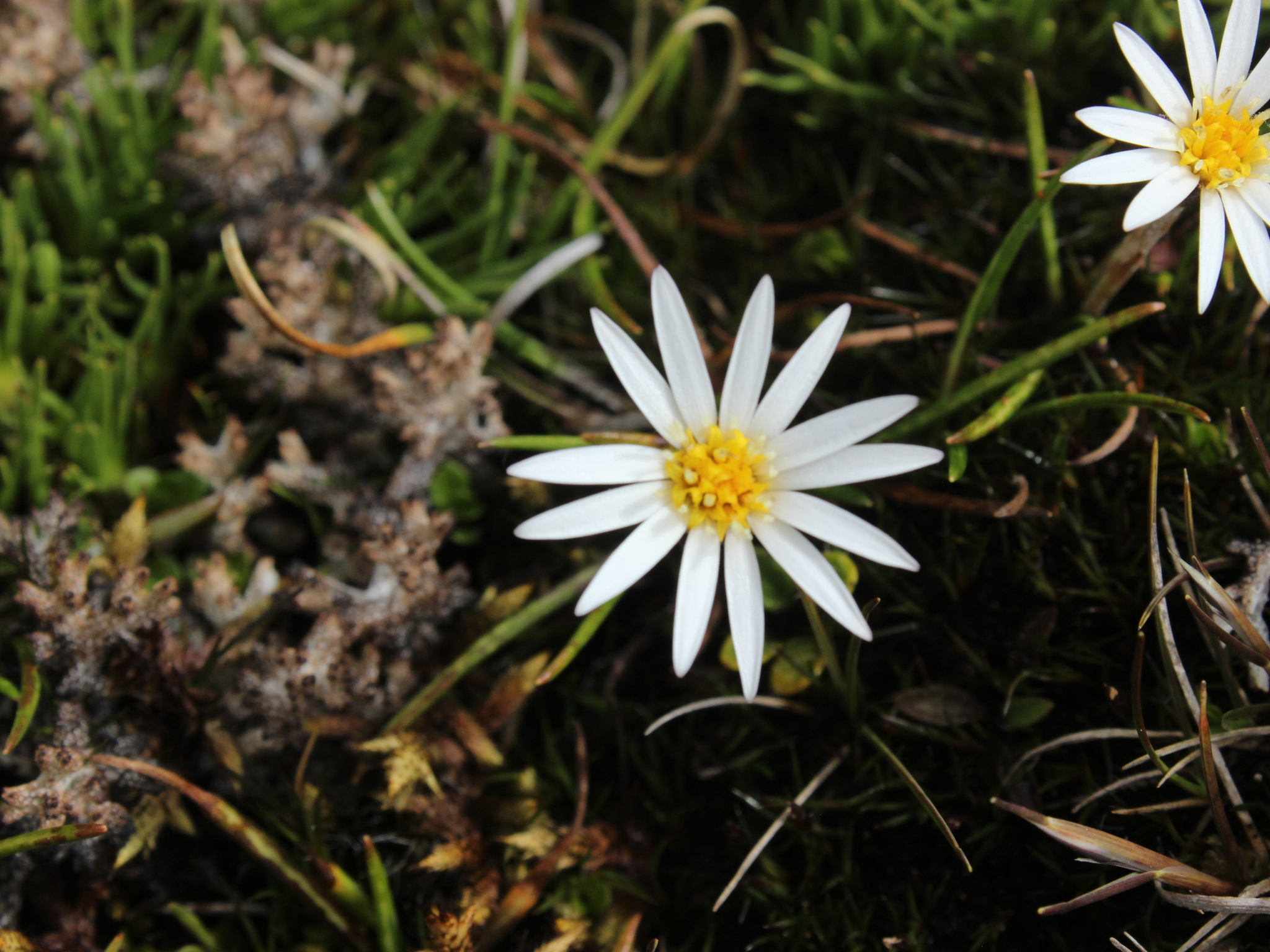
- Celmisia alpina on the West Coast

Conservation status
- Not Threatened (NZ TCS)

Scientific classification
- Kingdom: Plantae
- Clade: Embryophytes
- Clade: Tracheophytes
- Clade: Angiosperms
- Clade: Eudicots
- Clade: Asterids
- Order: Asterales
- Family: Asteraceae
- Genus: Celmisia
- Species: C. alpina

Binomial name
- Celmisia alpina (Kirk) Cheeseman

= Celmisia alpina =

Species of flowering plant

Celmisia alpina, or mountain daisy, is a species of perennial flower that is endemic to New Zealand.

== Description ==
A small flower with white petals and a yellow central flower head. The flower is a perennial.

The small size and narrow, linear leaves can be used to identify this flower in the field.

== Distribution and habitat ==
Celmisia alpina is found on the South Island and Stewart Island. It is widespread, and is not considered threatened. It is found in montane and alpine regions, particularly poorly-drained ones.

== Etymology ==
alpina is a reference to the alpine environment of the Southern Alps, where this flower is found. The Southern Alps were named after the Alps, from which the Latin term is ultimately derived.

== Taxonomy ==
Celmisia alpina is part of a wider Celmisia complex including Celmisia gracilenta, C. graminifolia, and C. setacea. Further work elucidating relationships is necessary.

The basionym is Celmisia longifolia var. alpina Kirk.
