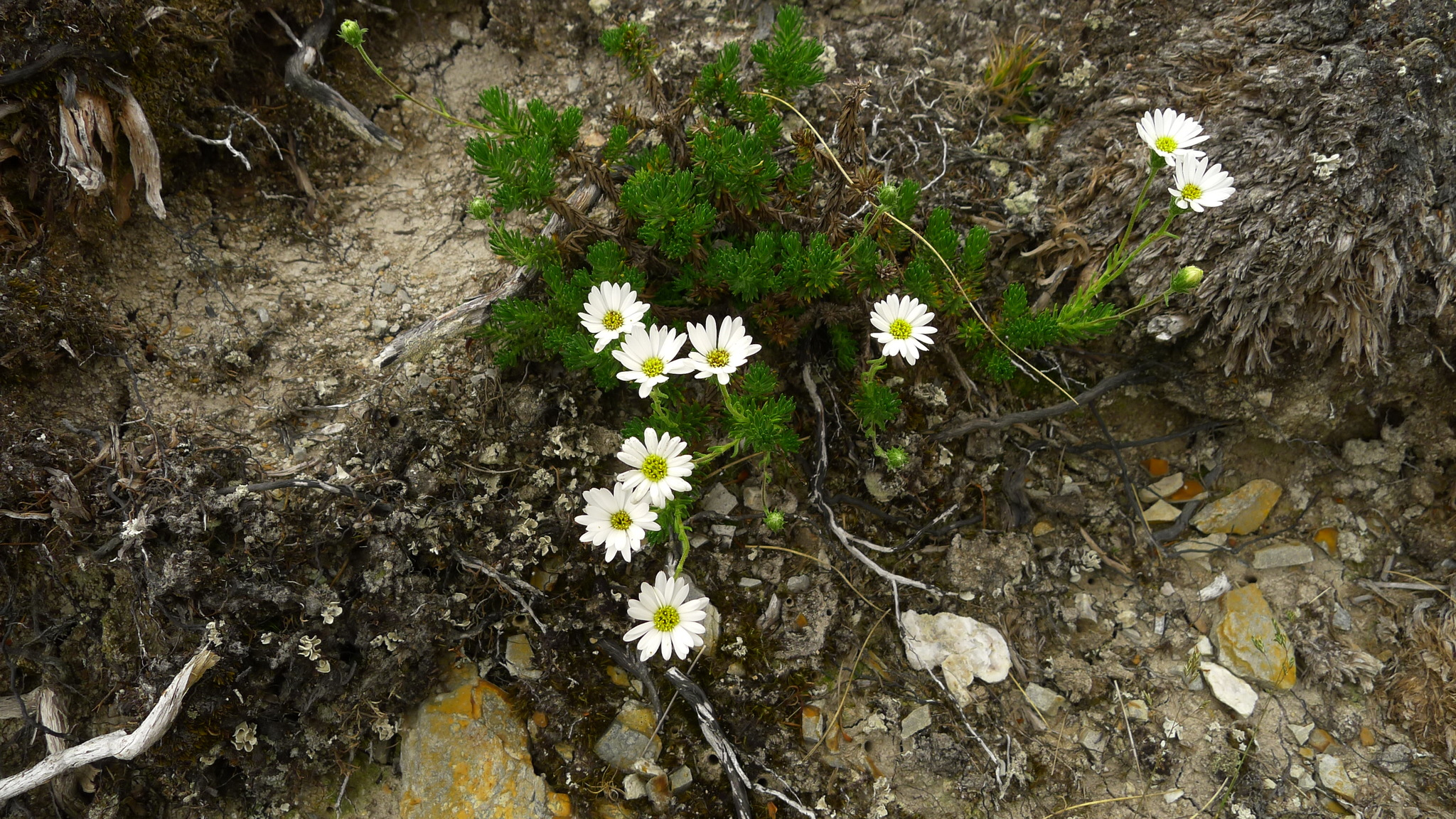
- Celmisia lateralis on Turk's Cap, Nelson

Conservation status
- Not Threatened (NZ TCS)

Scientific classification
- Kingdom: Plantae
- Clade: Embryophytes
- Clade: Tracheophytes
- Clade: Angiosperms
- Clade: Eudicots
- Clade: Asterids
- Order: Asterales
- Family: Asteraceae
- Genus: Celmisia
- Species: C. lateralis

Binomial name
- Celmisia lateralis Buchanan

= Celmisia lateralis =

Species of flowering plant

Celmisia lateralis, the shrub daisy, is a species of flowering plant, endemic to New Zealand. It is known exclusively from the South Island, where its white flowers can be seen in rocky areas in the mountains from Nelson to the Paparoas.

== Description ==
A small, prostrate green plant that grows white flowerheads. This Celmisia is similar to several others, and can be distinguished by the viscid (clammy or sticky) leaves, which are also mostly glabrous (hairless).

== Distribution and habitat ==
This species is known from the South Island of New Zealand, where it is found from the mountains around Nelson, down along the West Coast to the Paparoa Range. It is found in montane to subalpine areas, on rocky ground.

== Etymology ==
Lateralis is Latin for 'belonging to the side', or 'lateral', similar in meaning to the English word. In this case, the term refers to the position of the capitula. The lateral position is not unique to this species among Celmisias, however.

== Taxonomy ==
Celmisia lateralis contains two varieties:

- Celmisia lateralis var. lateralis
- Celmisia lateralis var. villosa

The type species is from near Lake Guyon, in Nelson Lakes National Park.
