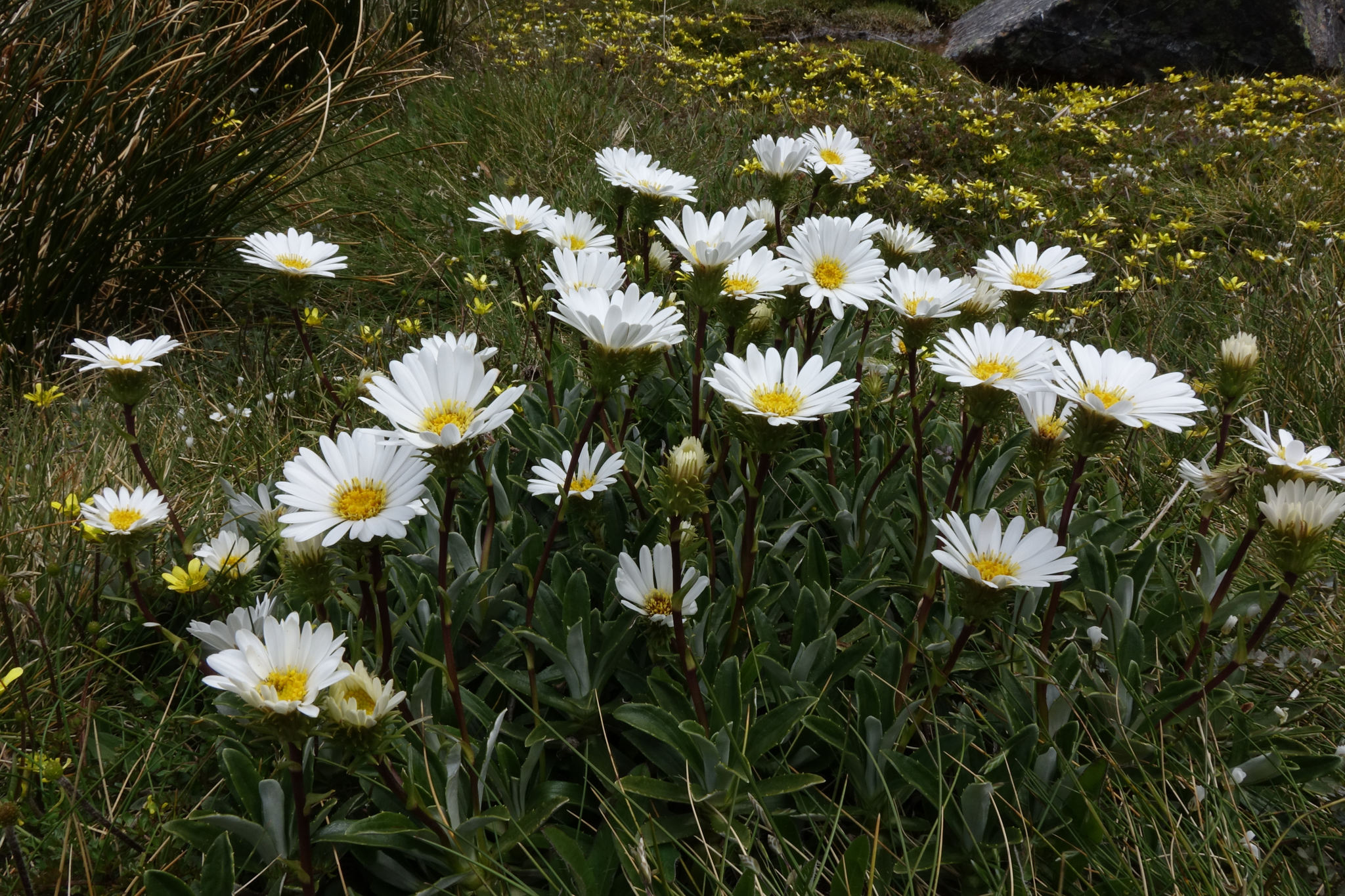

Scientific classification
- Kingdom: Plantae
- Clade: Tracheophytes
- Clade: Angiosperms
- Clade: Eudicots
- Clade: Asterids
- Order: Asterales
- Family: Asteraceae
- Genus: Celmisia
- Species: C. angustifolia

Binomial name
- Celmisia angustifolia Cockayne

Synonyms
- Celmisia novae-zealandiae Cheeseman, 1925; Erigeron novae-zealandiae Buchanan

= Celmisia angustifolia =

Species of flowering plant

Celmisia angustifolia, called the strap-leaved daisy, is a species of flowering plant in the genus Celmisia, native to the South Island of New Zealand. It has gained the Royal Horticultural Society's Award of Garden Merit.
