= Étienne Raoul =

French naval surgeon and naturalist

Étienne Fiacre Louis Raoul (23 July 1815 – 30 March 1852) was a French naval surgeon and naturalist.

He was born in Brest, the son of Joseph-François Raoul, a captain in the French Navy, and studied at the medical school in Brest. He was appointed surgeon, third class, in 1836. He took part in an expedition as surgeon-naturalist on the ship L'Aube under the command of Lieutenant Lavaud, to protect French colonists journeying to New Zealand on the emigrant vessel Comte de Paris. He landed at the Bay of Islands on 11 July 1840, and arrived in Akaroa, Banks Peninsula on 15 August 1840, a few months after the British had signed the Treaty of Waitangi with local Māori and claimed sovereignty over New Zealand. Raoul was based in Akaroa for the next two and a half years, making three visits to the Bay of Islands to collect botanical specimens and finally returning to France on L'Allier.

Upon his return, he worked at the Muséum national d'histoire naturelle (National Museum of Natural History) in Paris under the direction of Adolphe Brongniart (1801–1876) and Joseph Decaisne (1807–1882) to describe and classify the large number of specimens collected during his stay in New Zealand, representing around 450 species. At the same time, he studied medicine and obtained his doctorate in 1844 with the thesis Des rapports des maladies aigües et chroniques du cœur avec les affections dites rhumatismales ("Reports of acute and chronic coronary diseases with rheumatic ailments").

Raouls first published a preliminary paper in 1844 drawing on his own and others' collections, and in 1846 published a book Choix de plantes de la Nouvelle-Zélande ("Selected plants of New Zealand") in which he named and described numerous species new to science, including Celmisia mackaui (named after Admiral Ange René Armand de Mackau), karamū (Coprosma robusta), matagouri (Discaria toumatou), and narrow-leaved lacebark (Hoheria angustifolia). In an appendix he enumerated "all the plants thus far known in New Zealand."

After a short expedition to Africa in 1846, he became medical professor at the port of Brest in 1849. In 1851 he published Guide hygiénique et médical pour les bâtiments de commerce qui fréquentent la Côte Occidentale d’Afrique ("Sanitary and medical guide for merchant vessels visiting the West Coast of Africa").

In the 'jardin des explorateurs' at Brest, his place of death is given as Lannilis.

The genus Raoulia was named after him by Joseph Dalton Hooker.
