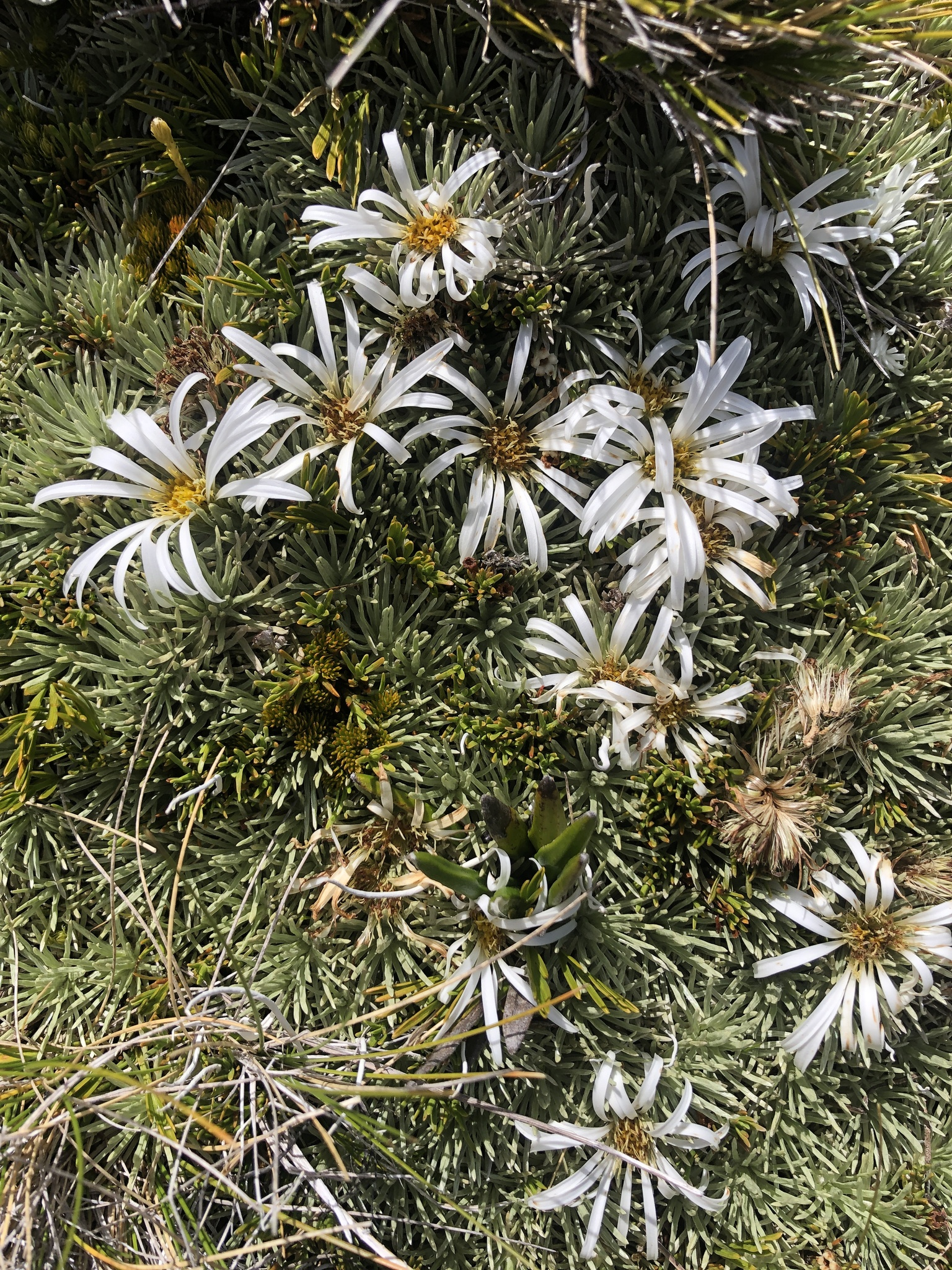
- Celmisia sessiliflora in Nelson Lakes National Park

Conservation status
- Not Threatened (NZ TCS)

Scientific classification
- Kingdom: Plantae
- Clade: Embryophytes
- Clade: Tracheophytes
- Clade: Angiosperms
- Clade: Eudicots
- Clade: Asterids
- Order: Asterales
- Family: Asteraceae
- Genus: Celmisia
- Species: C. sessiliflora

Binomial name
- Celmisia sessiliflora Hook.f. (1864)

= Celmisia sessiliflora =

Species of flowering plant

Celmisia sessiliflora, the white cushion mountain daisy, is a species of Celmisia native to alpine environments of the South Island of New Zealand.

== Description ==
Celmisia sessiliflora is a low sessile plant with white flowers.

== Range ==
Known only from the South Island of New Zealand.

== Habitat ==
Alpine and subalpine environments.

== Taxonomy ==
Celmisia sessiliflora contains the following varieties:

- Celmisia sessiliflora minor
- Celmisia sessiliflora pedunculata
- Celmisia sessiliflora exigua
