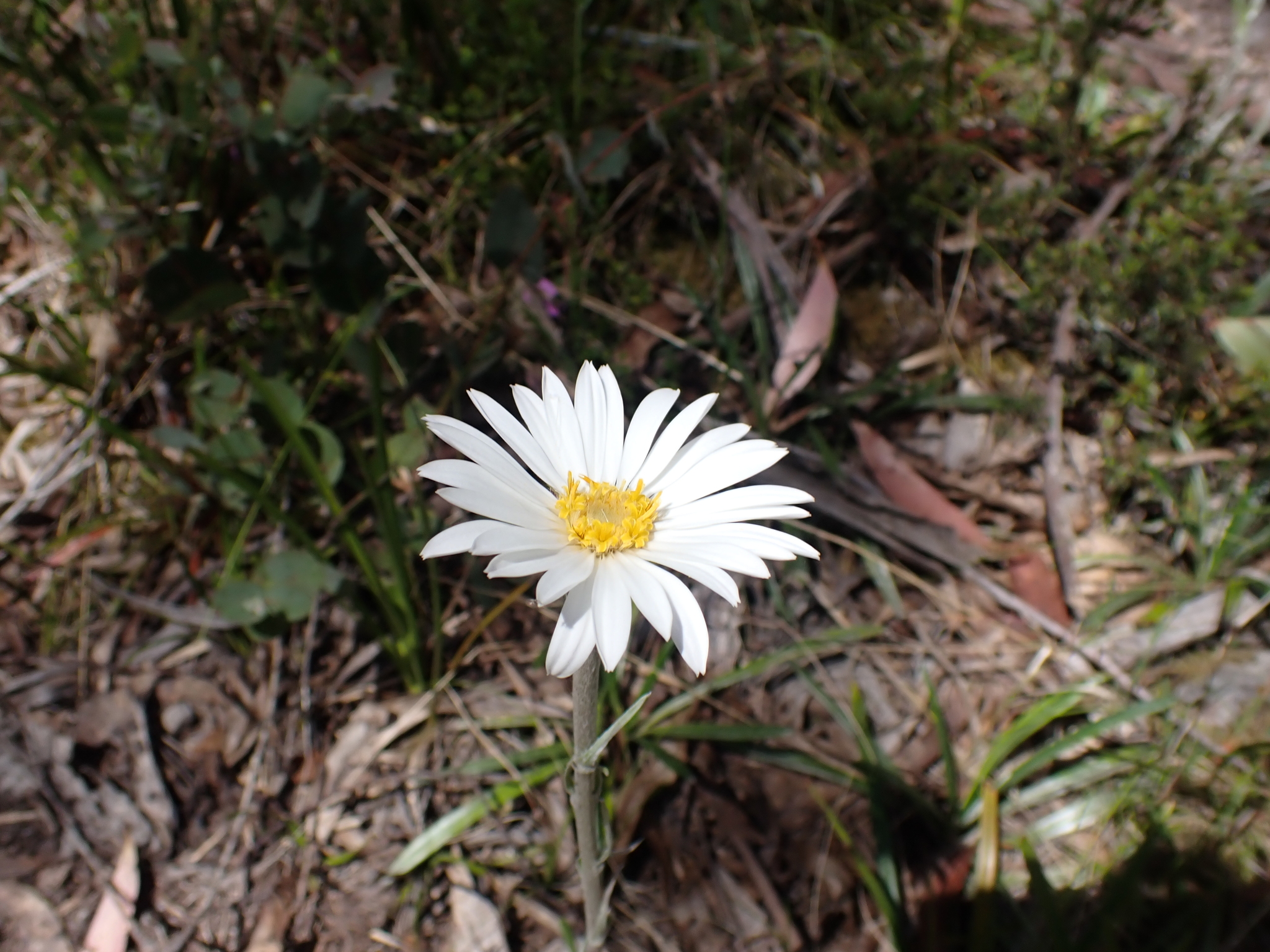

Scientific classification
- Kingdom: Plantae
- Clade: Tracheophytes
- Clade: Angiosperms
- Clade: Eudicots
- Clade: Asterids
- Order: Asterales
- Family: Asteraceae
- Genus: Celmisia
- Species: C. tomentella

Binomial name
- Celmisia tomentella M.Gray & Given

Synonyms
- Celmisia sp. B sensu Brown; Celmisia asteliifolia auct. non Hook.f.

= Celmisia tomentella =

Species of flowering plant

Celmisia tomentella is a species of perennial herb in the family Asteraceae. Leaves are 5 to 30 cm long and 5 to 15 mm wide, with a dark green or grey green upper surface. The daisy-like flowerheads, which are 6 to 8 cm in diameter, appear between December and February in the species native range. The species was first formally described in 1999 in New species and a new combination in Australian Celmisia (Asteraceae-Astereae) published in Australian Systematic Botany. It occurs in woodland, heath and bogs in subalpine areas including the Baw Baw plateau, the Bogong High Plains and Mount Buffalo in Victoria and northward into south-eastern New South Wales.
