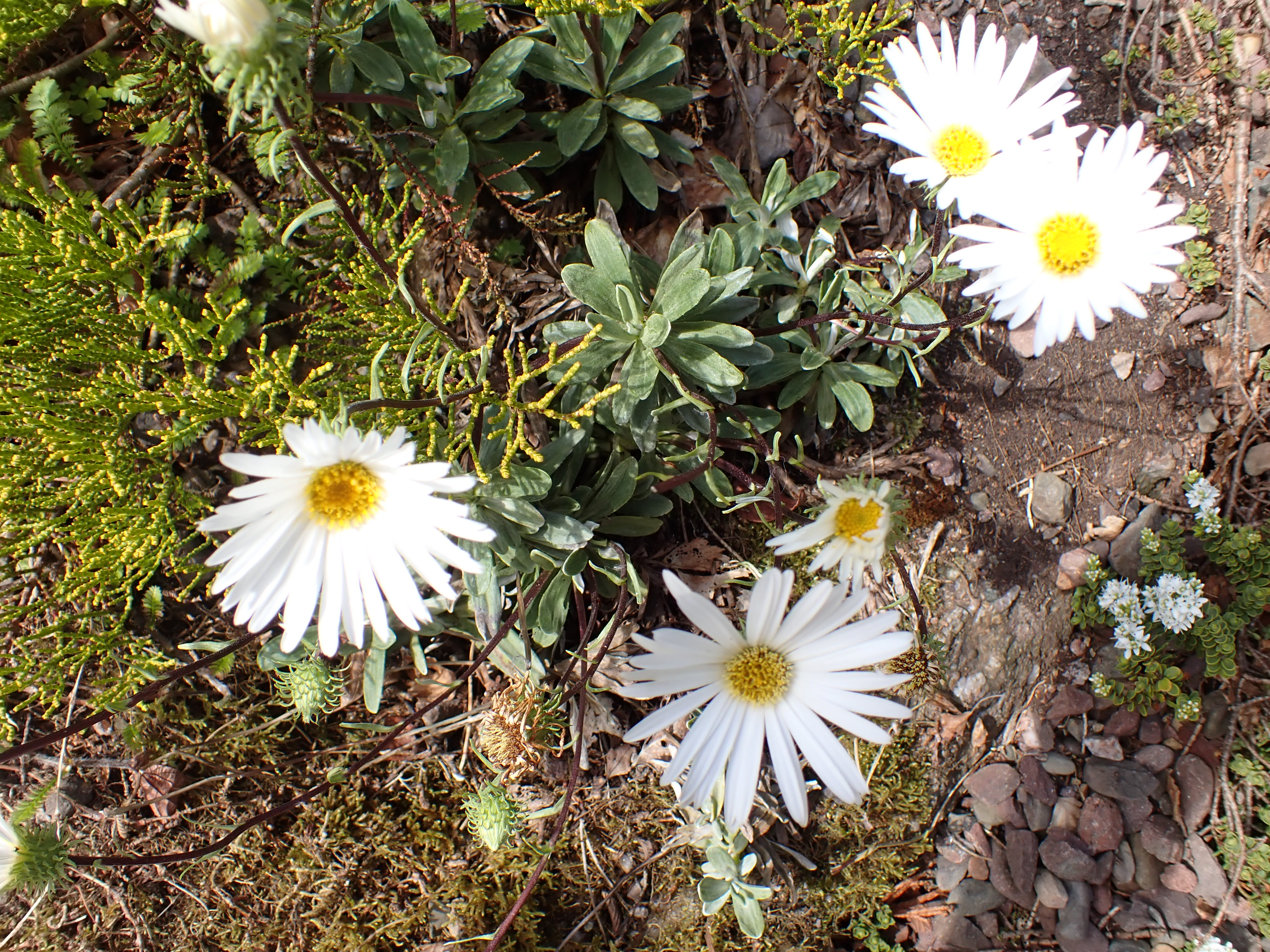
- White mountain daisies

Scientific classification
- Kingdom: Plantae
- Clade: Embryophytes
- Clade: Tracheophytes
- Clade: Spermatophytes
- Clade: Angiosperms
- Clade: Eudicots
- Clade: Asterids
- Order: Asterales
- Family: Asteraceae
- Genus: Celmisia
- Species: C. incana

Binomial name
- Celmisia incana Hook.f.

= Celmisia incana =

Species of plant endemic to New Zealand

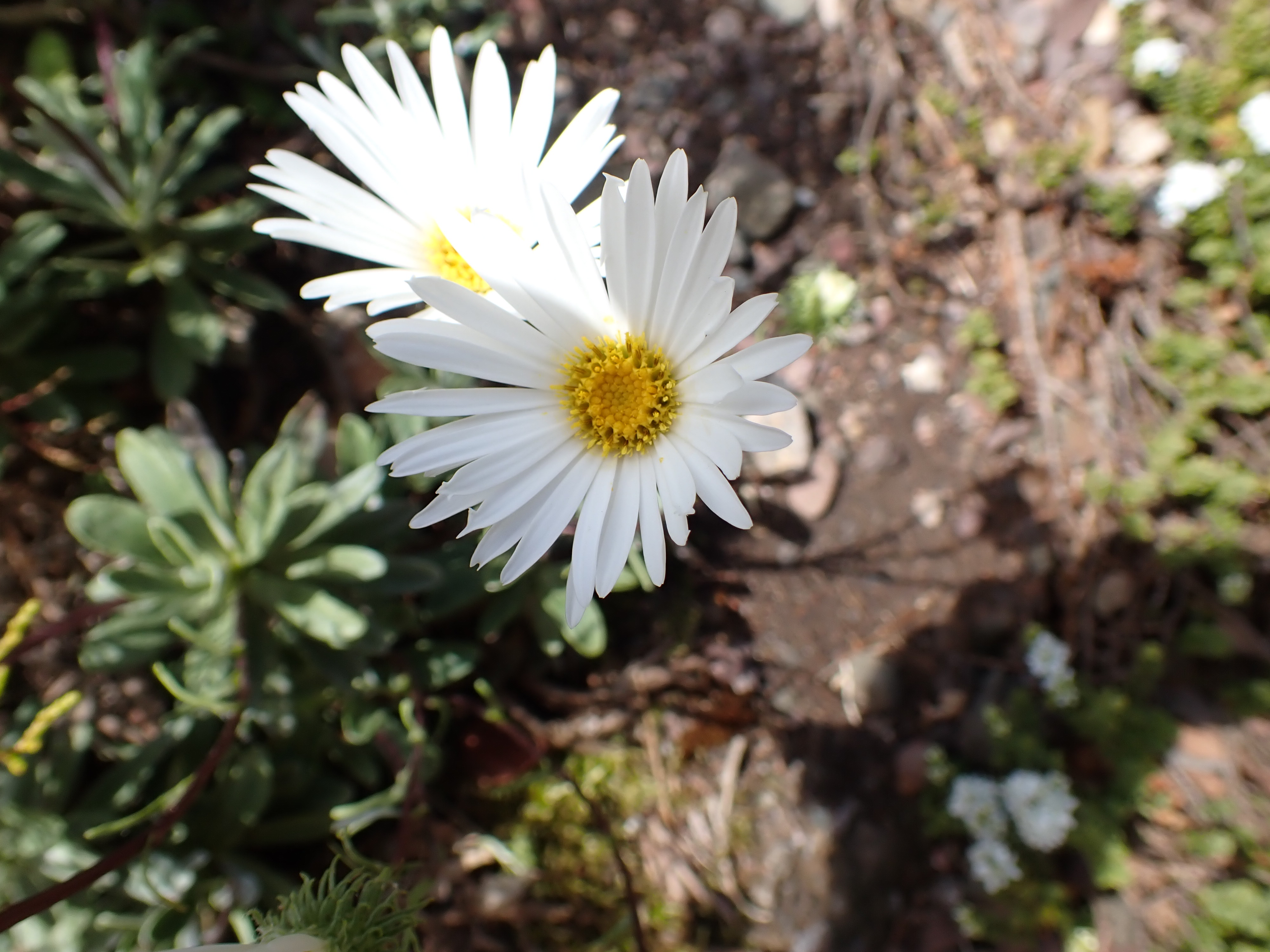
Flower detail

Celmisia incana, commonly known as white mountain daisy, is a species of perennial alpine plant of the family Asteraceae, and is native to New Zealand.

== Description ==
Celmisia incana is a perennial plant with stout woody stems up to about 100 mm (3.9 in) in diameter, with leathery, egg-shaped to oblong leaves 20–40 mm (0.79–1.57 in) long and 10–15 mm (0.39–0.59 in) wide on a petiole up to 5 mm (0.20 in) wide, arranged in close rosettes. The leaves are densely covered with woolly white hairs pressed against the surface. The flowers are borne on a slender scape up to 120 mm (4.7 in) long and densely covered with woolly hairs. The heads or daisy-like "flowers" are 25–35 mm (0.98–1.38 in) in diameter with many linear to tapering involucral bracts 10–15 mm (0.39–0.59 in) long at the base. Each head has narrow white ray florets, up to about 12 mm (0.47 in) long, surrounding funnel shaped disc florets 7–8 mm (0.28–0.31 in) long. Flowering occurs from September to March and the fruit is a flattened cylindrical achene 3.0–3.5 mm (0.12–0.14 in) long with narrowly triangular teeth, the pappus white 7–8 mm (0.28–0.31 in) long with minute barbed hairs.

== Taxonomy ==
Celmisia incana was first formally described by Joseph Dalton Hooker in "The Botany of the Antarctic Voyage of H.M. Discovery Ships Erebus and Terror"." from specimens collected by Georg Forster in Dusky Bay. The specific epithet (incana) means 'grey' or 'hoary'.

== Distribution and habitat ==
White mountain daisy grows in montane to alpine grassland from the Moehau Range on the Coromandel Peninsula of the North Island to Otago on the South Island of New Zealand.
