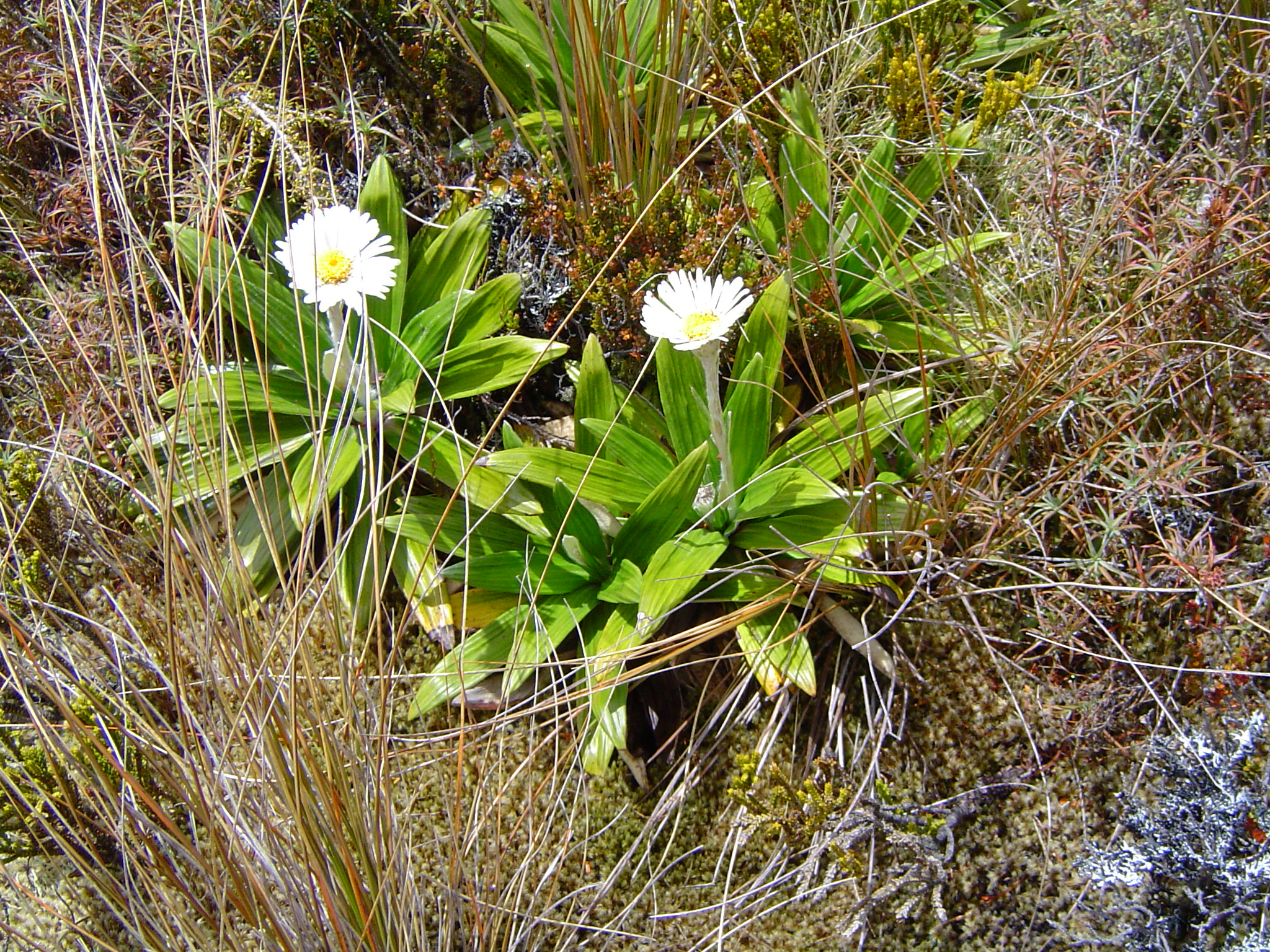
- Celmisia spectabilis in Tongariro National Park

Scientific classification
- Kingdom: Plantae
- Clade: Embryophytes
- Clade: Tracheophytes
- Clade: Spermatophytes
- Clade: Angiosperms
- Clade: Eudicots
- Clade: Asterids
- Order: Asterales
- Family: Asteraceae
- Subfamily: Asteroideae
- Tribe: Astereae
- Subtribe: Celmisiinae
- Genus: Celmisia; Cass. 1825, conserved name, not Cass. 1817.

Synonyms
- Celmisia Cass. 1817, rejected name, not Cass. 1825.; Alciope DC.; Elcismia B.L.Rob.

= Celmisia =

Genus of flowering plants

Celmisia (New Zealand aster or New Zealand daisy) is a genus of perennial herbs or subshrubs, in the family Asteraceae. Most of the species are endemic to New Zealand; several others are endemic to Australia.

Species and nothospecies

- Celmisia ×boweana Petrie
- Celmisia ×christensenii Cockayne
- Celmisia ×compacta Cheeseman
- Celmisia ×flaccida Cockayne
- Celmisia ×lanigera Petrie
- Celmisia ×linearis J.B.Armstr.
- Celmisia ×mollis Cockayne
- Celmisia ×popelwellii Petrie
- Celmisia ×pseudolyallii (Cheeseman) Cockayne
- Celmisia adamsii Kirk
- Celmisia allanii W.Martin
- Celmisia alpina (Kirk) Cheeseman
- Celmisia angustifolia Cockayne
- Celmisia argentea Kirk
- Celmisia armstrongii Petrie
- Celmisia asteliifolia Hook.f.
- Celmisia bellidioides Hook.f.
- Celmisia bonplandii (Buchanan) Allan
- Celmisia brevifolia Cockayne
- Celmisia campbellensis F.R.Chapm.
- Celmisia cockayneana Petrie
- Celmisia cordatifolia Buchanan
- Celmisia coriacea (G.Forst.) Hook.f.
- Celmisia dallii Buchanan
- Celmisia densiflora Hook.f.
- Celmisia discolor Hook.f.
- Celmisia dubia Cheeseman
- Celmisia durietzii Cockayne
- Celmisia gibbsii Cheeseman
- Celmisia glabrescens Petrie
- Celmisia glandulosa Hook.f.
- Celmisia gracilenta Hook.f.
- Celmisia graminifolia Hook.f.
- Celmisia haastii Hook.f.
- Celmisia hectorii Hook.f.
- Celmisia hieraciifolia Hook.f.
- Celmisia holosericea (G.Forst.) Hook.f.
- Celmisia hookeri Cockayne
- Celmisia inaccessa Given
- Celmisia incana Hook.f.
- Celmisia insignis W.Martin
- Celmisia laricifolia Hook.f.
- Celmisia lateralis Buchanan
- Celmisia latifolia (F.Muell. ex Benth.) M.Gray & Given
- Celmisia lindsayi Hook.f.
- Celmisia longifolia Cass.
- Celmisia lyallii Hook.f.
- Celmisia mackaui Raoul
- Celmisia macmahonii Kirk
- Celmisia major Cheeseman
- Celmisia markii W.G.Lee & Given
- Celmisia monroi Hook.f.
- Celmisia morganii Cheeseman
- Celmisia morrisonii Cockayne
- Celmisia novae-zealandiae (Buchanan) Cheeseman
- Celmisia parva Kirk
- Celmisia petriei Cheeseman
- Celmisia philocremna Given
- Celmisia polyvena G.Simpson & J.S.Thomson
- Celmisia prorepens Petrie
- Celmisia pugioniformis M.Gray & Given
- Celmisia ramulosa Hook.f.
- Celmisia repens (Kunth) Sch.Bip.
- Celmisia rupestris Cheeseman
- Celmisia rutlandii Kirk
- Celmisia saxifraga (Benth.) W.M.Curtis
- Celmisia semicordata Petrie
- Celmisia sericophylla J.H.Willis
- Celmisia sessiliflora ^{Hook.f.}
- Celmisia similis Given
- Celmisia sinclairii Hook.f.
- Celmisia spectabilis Hook.f.
- Celmisia spedenii G.Simpson
- Celmisia thomsonii Cheeseman
- Celmisia tomentella M.Gray & Given
- Celmisia traversii Hook.f.
- Celmisia verbascifolia Hook.f.
- Celmisia vespertina Given
- Celmisia viscosa Hook.f.
- Celmisia walkeri Kirk
