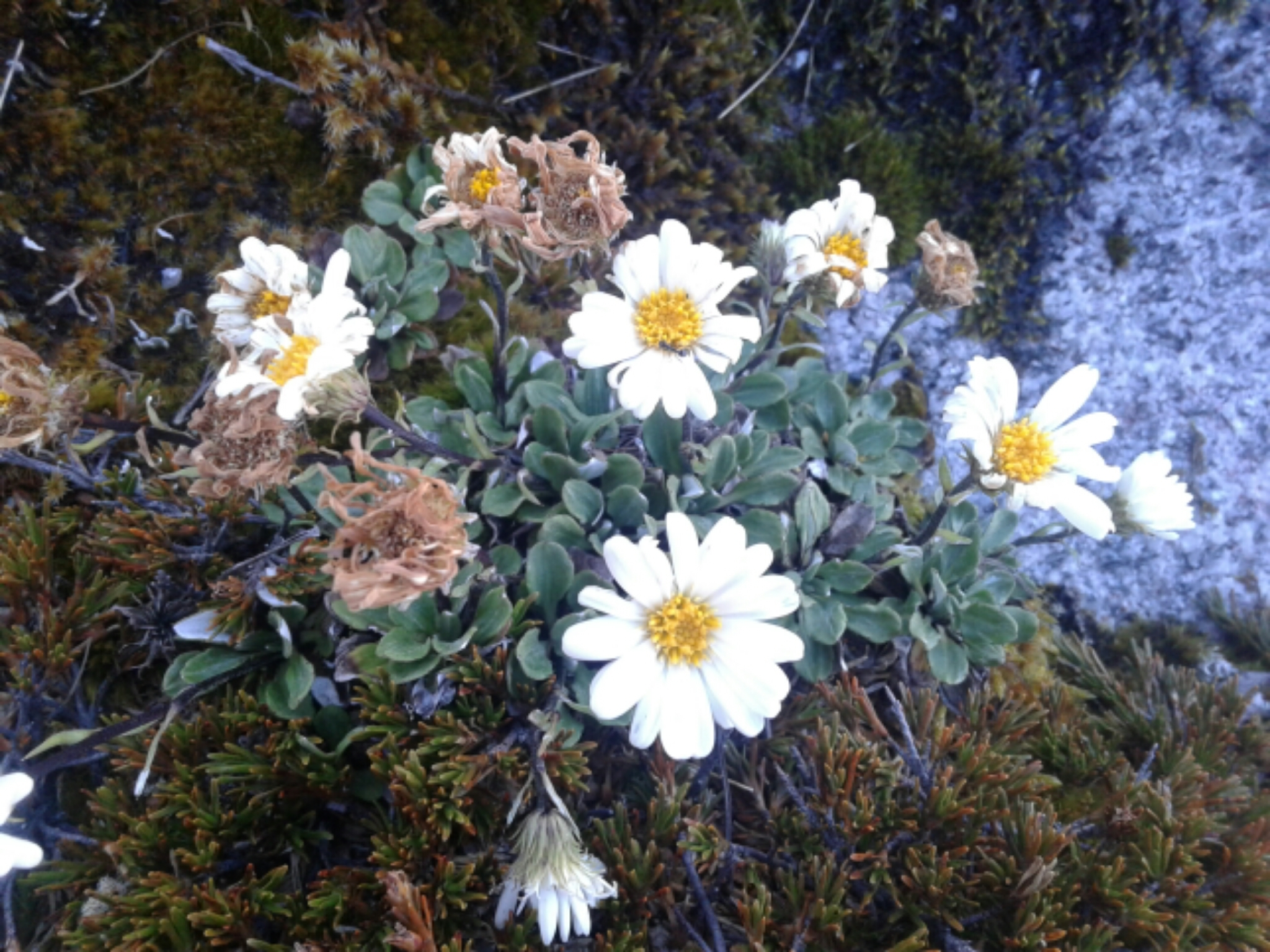
- Celmisia discolor in the Paparoa Range

Conservation status
- Not Threatened (NZ TCS)

Scientific classification
- Kingdom: Plantae
- Clade: Tracheophytes
- Clade: Angiosperms
- Clade: Eudicots
- Clade: Asterids
- Order: Asterales
- Family: Asteraceae
- Genus: Celmisia
- Species: C. discolor

Binomial name
- Celmisia discolor Hook.f.

= Celmisia discolor =

Species of flowering plant

Celmisia discolor is a species of Celmisia that is endemic to New Zealand.

== Description ==
It is a perennial flower.

The flower stems are woody and stout, and up to 35 mm (1.4 in) long. The flower petals are white.

== Distribution and habitat ==
This species is known from alpine to subalpine areas of mountainous regions of the South Island, from an elevation of around 1000–1700m. It is less frequent in the drier areas near Canterbury on the eastern slopes.

== Etymology ==
The species-name discolor refers to the different colors of the upper and lower surfaces of the leaves; discolor means 'different surfaces' in Latin. However, this trait is not always apparent.

== Taxonomy ==
This species was first described in 1852 (or 1853) by Joseph Dalton Hooker. The type species is from near Nelson.

Celmisia discolor contains the following varieties:

- Celmisia discolor var. ampla
- Celmisia discolor var. discolor
- Celmisia discolor var. intermedia

There is also a beta variety.
