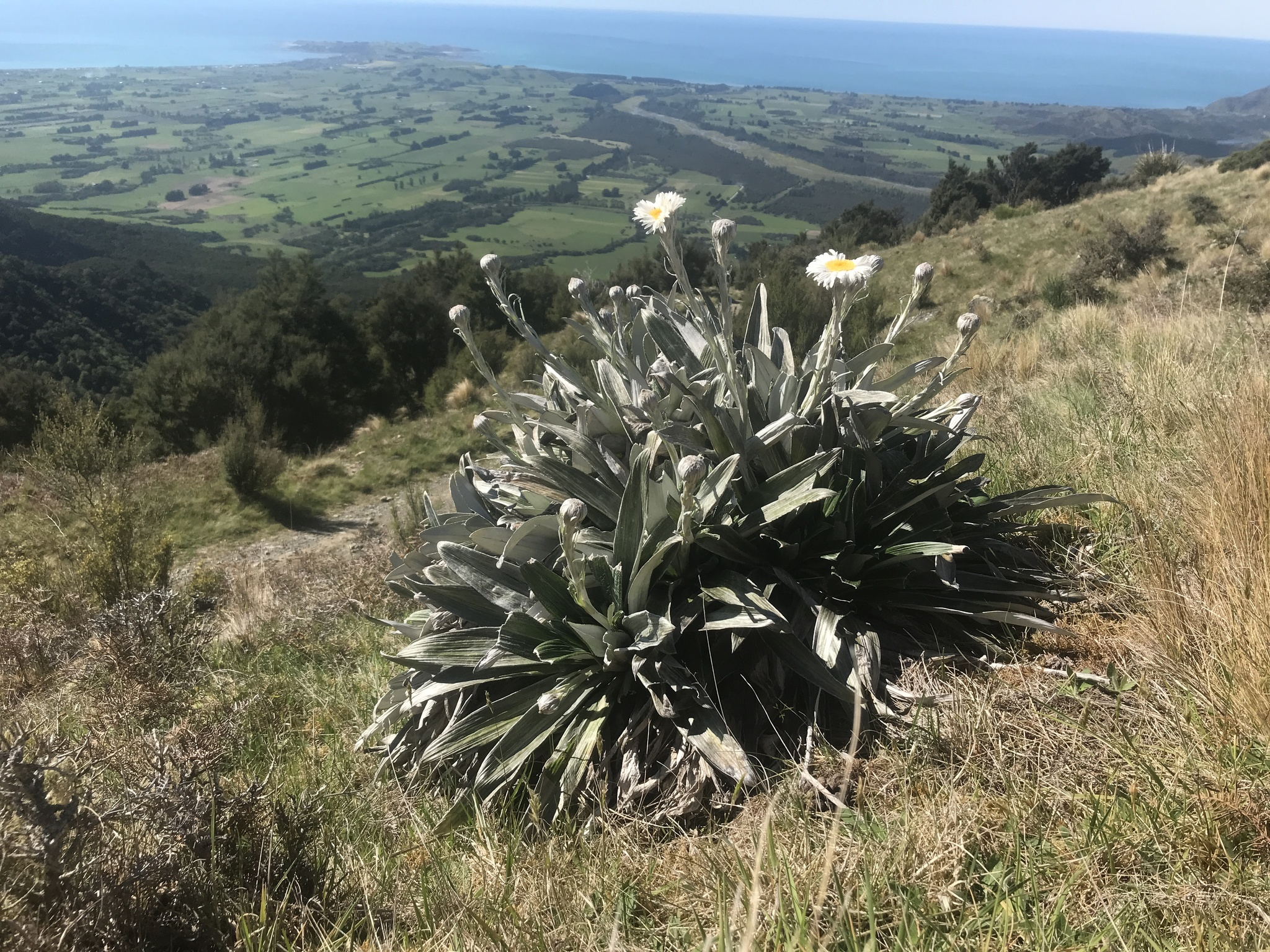
- Celmisia monroi in the Canterbury Region

Conservation status
- Not Threatened (NZ TCS)

Scientific classification
- Kingdom: Plantae
- Clade: Embryophytes
- Clade: Tracheophytes
- Clade: Spermatophytes
- Clade: Angiosperms
- Clade: Eudicots
- Clade: Asterids
- Order: Asterales
- Family: Asteraceae
- Genus: Celmisia
- Species: C. monroi

Binomial name
- Celmisia monroi Hook.f.

= Celmisia monroi =

Species of flowering plant

Celmisia monroi, the rock cotton plant, or Monro's mountain daisy, is a species of flowering plant, endemic to New Zealand.

== Description ==
This is a generally thick-set herb with leaves that radiate out from a central point. The leaves are long and green/grey, and stiff. The florets are white.

== Range and habitat ==
This species is native to the northeast corner of the South Island. It grows from the coast to alpine areas, and prefers rocky habitats that are well drained and dry. On the coast it grows near limestone. In mountainous areas, it can be found near in particular on rocky escarpments in tussock grasslands, or on scree slopes.

== Etymology ==
This species was named for Sir David Monro.

== Taxonomy ==
Celmisia monroi includes the following varieties:

- Celmisia monroi var. robusta
- Celmisia monroi var. conspicua
