= Celmisia saxifraga =

Small snow daisy

Scientific classification
- Kingdom: Plantae
- Clade: Tracheophytes
- Clade: Angiosperms
- Clade: Eudicots
- Clade: Asterids
- Order: Asterales
- Family: Asteraceae
- Genus: Celmisia
- Species: C. saxifraga

Binomial name
- Celmisia saxifraga

Species of plant

Celmisia saxifraga, commonly known as the small snow daisy, is a perennial herb in the Asteraceae family. It is native to Tasmania and Victoria, where it grows in alpine grasslands above the snowline.

== Description ==
Like other members of the Asteraceae family, C. saxifraga has a composite flower head with both disk and ray florets. Inflorescence are a typical daisy arrangement with white outsides and a yellow centre. The entire inflorescence can be 3 cm across and is often held well above the rosette on a hairy stem, growing to 15 cm. The fruit is small, hard and dry, similar to a sunflower seed. This is often called an achene, but in Asteraceae is more accurately called a cypsela. The primary difference between the two being that a cypsela is a single fruit formed from two ovaries (as in C. saxifraga) while an achene describes a fruit formed from a single ovary. The leaves of C. saxifraga are simple and entire, growing to 3 cm long. They are glaucous silver and hairy. C. saxifraga can be distinguished from the similar and co-occurring C. asteliifolia by its leaves. The leaves of C. saxifraga are shorter (~3 cm) than those of C. asteliifolia (up to 18 cm).

== Etymology ==
"Saxifraga" is a combination of the Latin words saxum, meaning "stone", and frangere meaning "to break". The name "stone-breaker" is however thought to refer to plant in the genus Saxifraga being used in treating kidney stones. It is unclear whether C. saxifraga is named for breaking rocks or for its similarity to certain Saxifraga species which are also herbaceous and rosette-forming.
