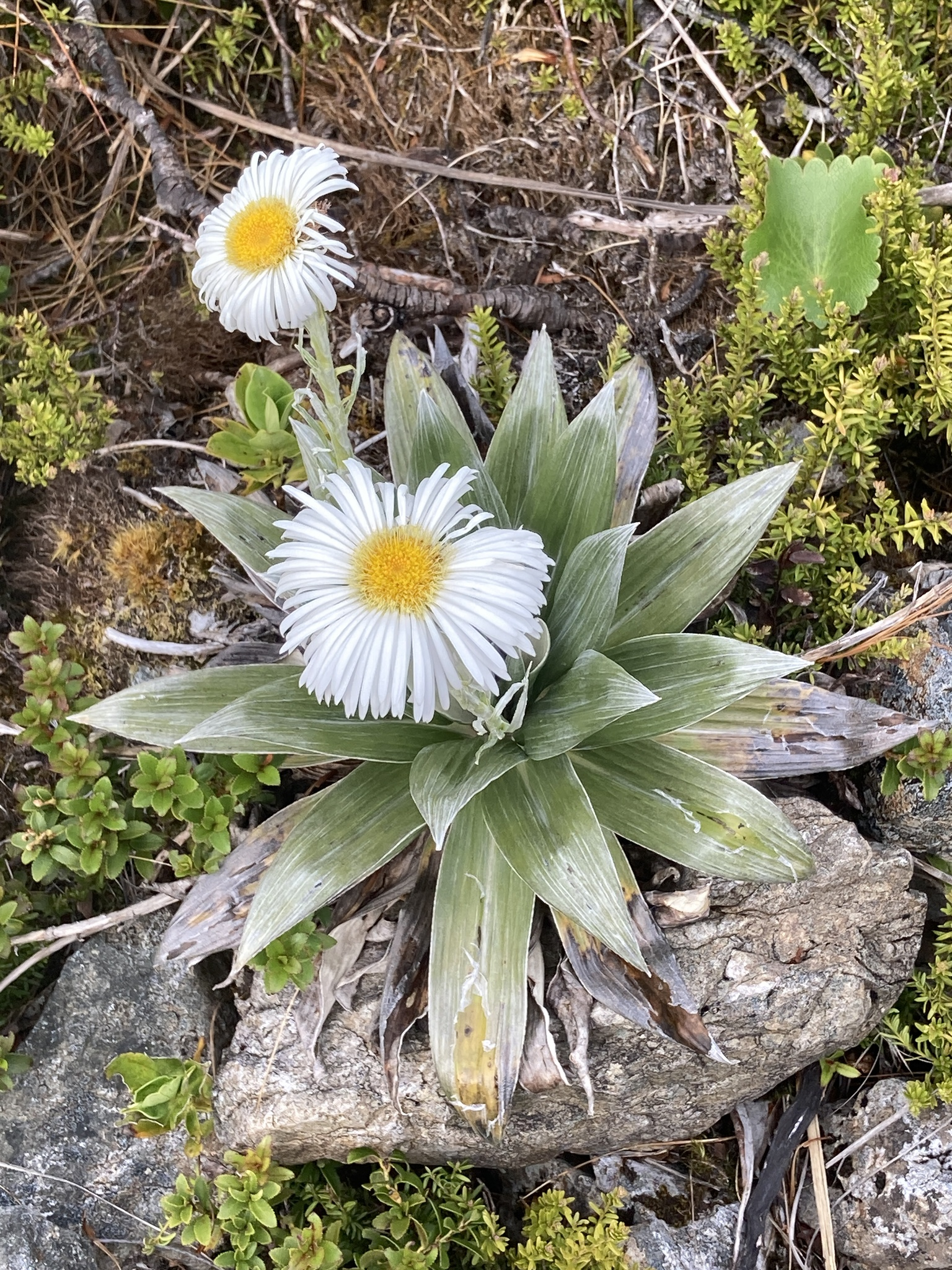
- Celmisia semicordata in Nelson Lakes National Park

Conservation status
- Not Threatened (NZ TCS)

Scientific classification
- Kingdom: Plantae
- Clade: Embryophytes
- Clade: Tracheophytes
- Clade: Angiosperms
- Clade: Eudicots
- Clade: Asterids
- Order: Asterales
- Family: Asteraceae
- Genus: Celmisia
- Species: C. semicordata

Binomial name
- Celmisia semicordata Petrie, 1914

= Celmisia semicordata =

Species of flowering plant

Celmisia semicordata, the large mountain daisy, is a species of Celmisia native to alpine environments of the South Island of New Zealand.

Both celmisia spectabilis and celmisia semicordata are known as 'Tikumu' in Te Reo Māori. Other Māori names include matua-tikumu, puakaito, pūharetāiko, pūheretāiko, pūwharetāiko and kotara.

== Description ==
Celmisia semicordata is a small plant with a white flower surrounded by green and silver leaves.

The underside of the leaf is waterproof with a soft hair-like covering called tomentum which offers protection in extreme weather conditions.

Plant fibers were incorporated into textiles by Māori, likely used to make a garment waterproof.

== Range ==
Known only from the South Island of New Zealand.

== Habitat ==
Coastal to alpine environments. Celmisia semicordata favours cooler temperatures and free draining soil.
