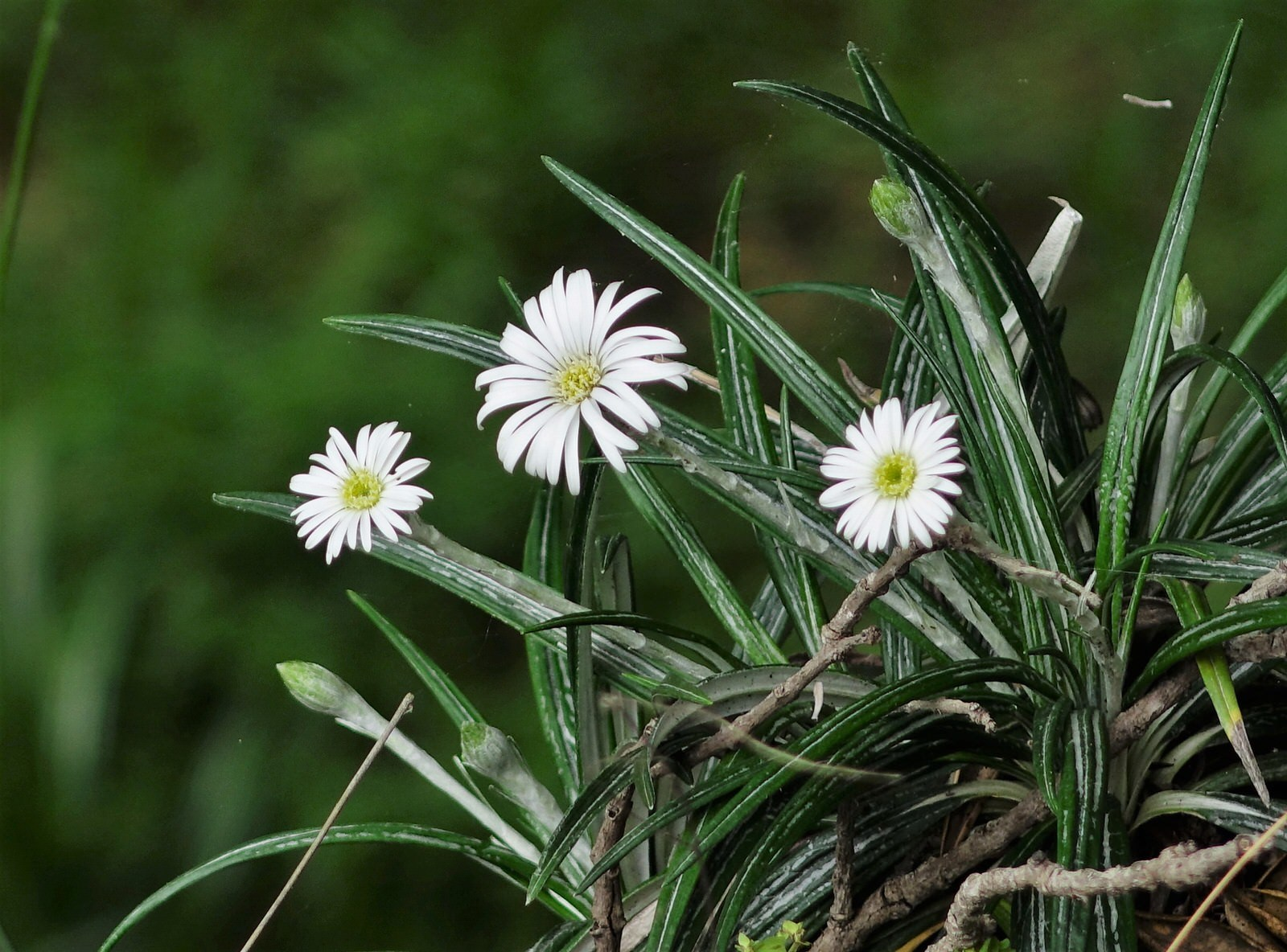
- Celmisia major var. major
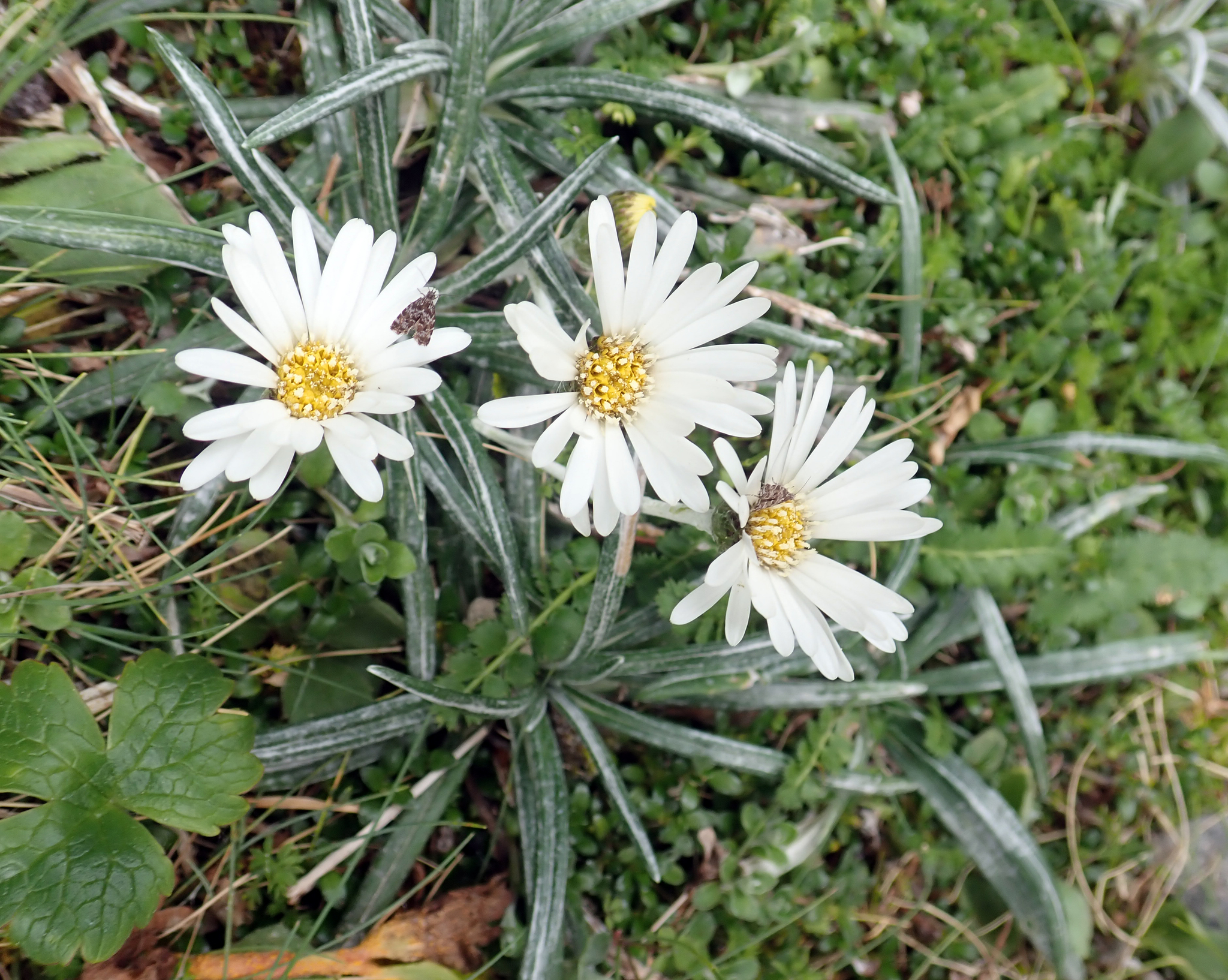
- Celmisia major var. brevis

Conservation status
- Naturally Uncommon (NZ TCS)

Scientific classification
- Kingdom: Plantae
- Clade: Tracheophytes
- Clade: Angiosperms
- Clade: Eudicots
- Clade: Asterids
- Order: Asterales
- Family: Asteraceae
- Genus: Celmisia
- Species: C. major

Binomial name
- Celmisia major Cheeseman, 1925
- Native range of Celmisia major: var. brevis var. major

= Celmisia major =

Species of daisy

Celmisia major is a species of daisy that is endemic to New Zealand. It is split into two different varieties, Celmisia major var. major and Celmisia major var. brevis. Despite being in the same species, it is thought that the two varieties are not close to one another, with botanist Peter James de Lange stressing critical study on the taxonomy of the daisies. It was first described by Thomas Cheeseman in 1925. The major variety is found in the Auckland area and nearby islands, while the brevis variety is confined to Mount Taranaki.

== Taxonomy ==
Thomas Cheeseman first published Celmisia major's description in Manual of the New Zealand Flora in 1925. Celmisia major is split into two different varieties, var. major and var. brevis. It is part of a poorly resolved species complex consisting of various members of the genus Celmisia in New Zealand. C. major var. major is thought to be more similar to two other daisies, Celmisia adamsii var. rugulosa, which seems to be a heterotypic synonym of Celmisia graminifolia, than it is to var. brevis. Peter James de Lange remarks that var. brevis is "certainly not close to var. major" and he stressed further critical study on the matter of the two daisies and their relations to one another.

== Description ==
Celmisia major var. brevis can be differentiated from var. major by its smaller size and its more open and weakly developed pseudo-involucre. Celmisia major var. brevis is also range restricted on Mount Taranaki.

=== var. brevis ===
Celmisia major var. brevis is a small herb with tufted leaves and simple or branched stems. The leaves are narrow and leathery in texture, the upper surface of the leaves are a darker silvery green in color and are marked with parallel grooves. The leaves are hairy and the edges of the leaf are curved backwards. The scape, or the flower stem, ranges from hairy to smooth. The upper bracts of the plant are developed into a pseudo-involucre. The flower head is 20–40 millimetres (0.79–1.57 in) in diameter. The flowers are yellow and white in colour, they flower between the months of October and February, and start fruiting between the months of November and April.

A short-lived plant, it is described as one of the few members of the genus Celmisia who do well in cultivation. It grows well from fresh seed and does well in a semi-shaded site with moist and free-draining soil. It does not prefer humidity.

=== var. major ===
Celmisia major var. major is a tufted herb. The leaves are 100–400 millimetres (3.9–15.7 in) in length and 5–20 millimetres (0.20–0.79 in) in width. They range in shape from narrow and linear to lanceolate. The leaves are leathery in texture and have a dark green upper surface, with an often fractured skin, leaving the leaves with a silvery green mottled appearance. The underside of the leaves are hairy and silvery white. The flower stem, also known as the scape, ranges from hairy to smooth, the flower head is 20–40 millimetres (0.79–1.57 in) in diameter. The flower head is white and yellow, the plant flowers from the months of August to February, with its peak at October to November. The plant begins to fruit between the months of October and May, but with a peak in December.

The plant is easy to sow from seeds or through dividing the plants. The plant prefers moist soil with sunlight and no weeds.

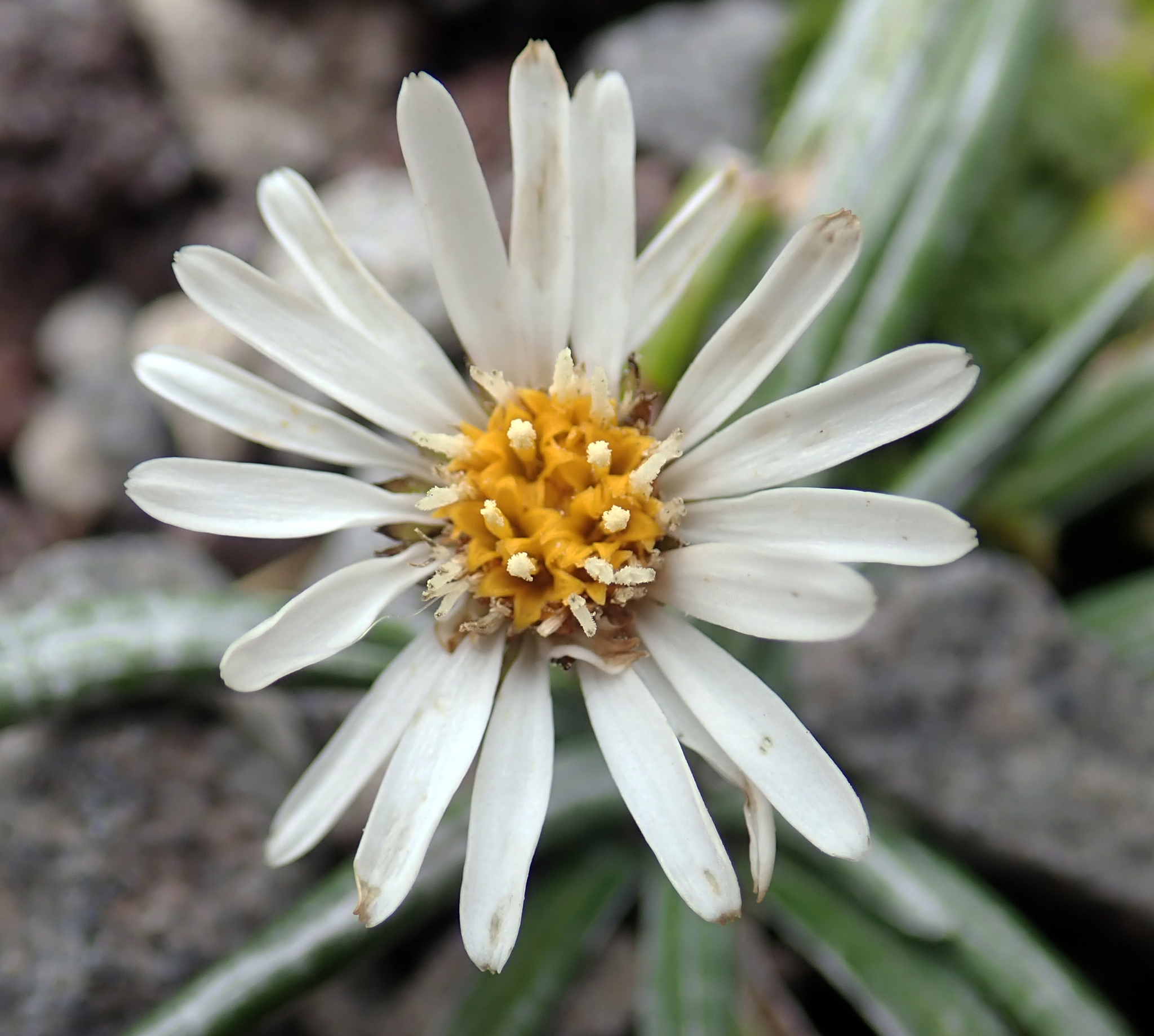
Detail of the flower of var. brevis

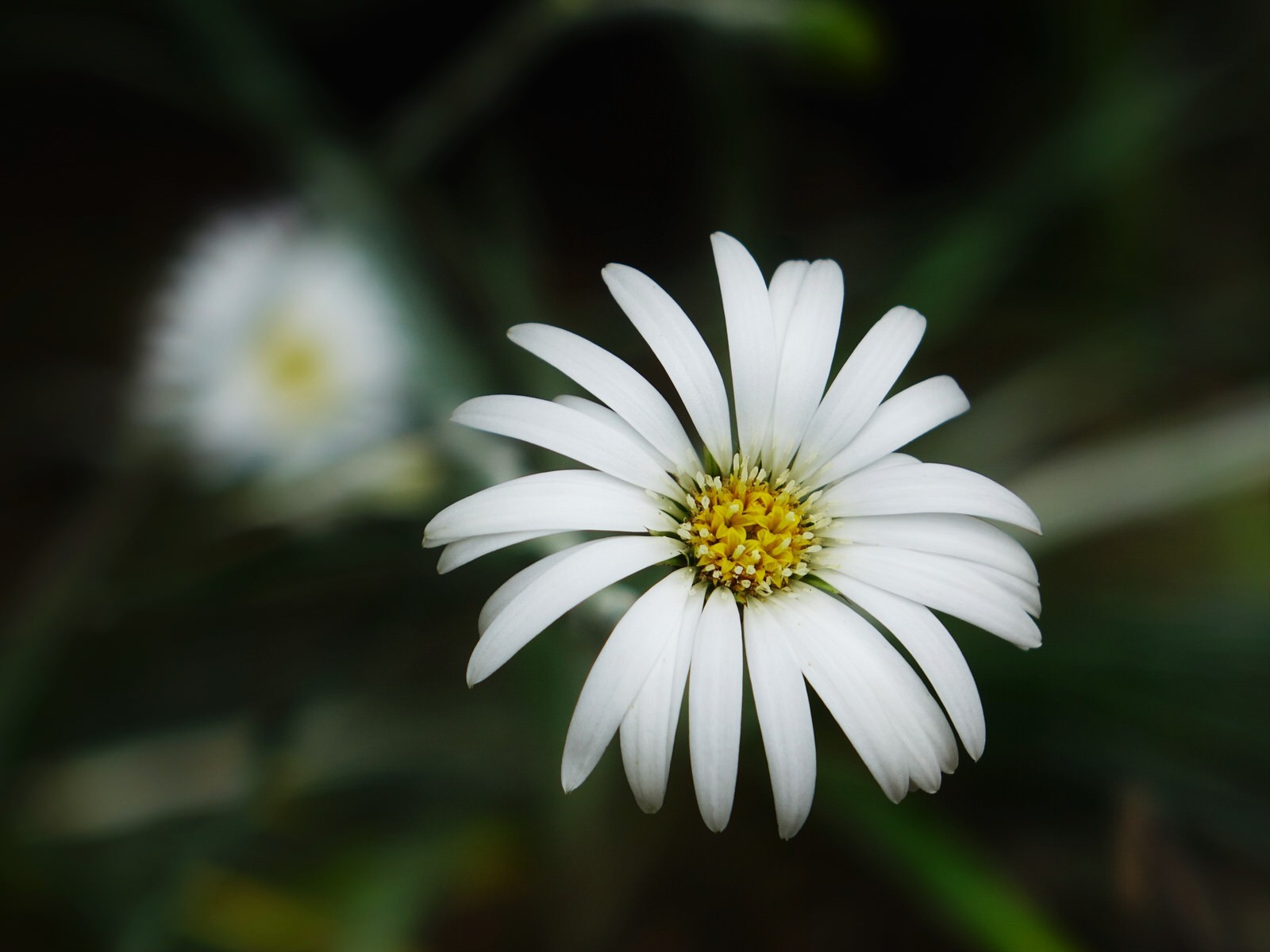
Detail of the flower of var. major

== Distribution ==
=== var. brevis ===
Celmisia major var. brevis is endemic to Mount Taranaki, formerly known as Mount Egmont.

=== var. major ===
Celmisia major var. major is found on New Zealand's North Island. It is found in West Auckland, from Muriwai to Cornwallis, as well as the islands of Aiguilles Island, Great Barrier Island, where it may be extinct, and Kaikōura Island.

=== Habitat ===
==== var. brevis ====
The plant is found in the alpine and subalpine herbfields of Mount Taranaki.

==== var. major ====
The plant is strictly found on the coast. It is found on rock headlands, cliff faces, and islets, and occasionally on coastal shrublands. The plant grows on low turf on soils consisting of peat or silt. The plant grows in association with plants in the genera Disphyma, Samolus, and Tetragonia.

== Conservation ==
=== var. brevis ===
It is currently ranked as "At Risk – Naturally Uncommon" after a 2009 review, and this designation was renewed in a 2012 review. It was previously designated "Range Restricted" in a 2004 review by the New Zealand Threat Classification System.

The plant is naturally uncommon, as it is only found in the Mount Taranaki National Park. Despite its small and restricted range, it is abundant where it is actually found.

=== var. major ===
Celmisia major var. major is currently ranked as "At Risk-Naturally Uncommon" following a 2012 review by the New Zealand Threat Classification System. It was first given this designation in 2009, having previously been assessed at "Gradual Decline" in 2004.

It is threatened by habitat encroachment by other plants, which grow faster and taller than the daisy, as well as threats from coastal erosion. Since the daisy is found in sites with heavy foot traffic, the plants have been trampled by individuals seeking to access popular headland and shore inlet sightseeing sites. Overcollecting also serves as a factor in decline. The plant is scarce on Great Barrier Island, only being found in a single location.

== Etymology ==
The generic epithet is derived from Kelmis, a mythical Dactyl from Mount Ida. Kelmis, whose name meant "casting", was a blacksmith friend of Zeus. Ovid's Metamorphoses described Kelmis as offending Zeus enough that he transformed Kelmis into adamant. The specific epithet major means "greater" in Latin, while "brevis" means "short" in Latin.
