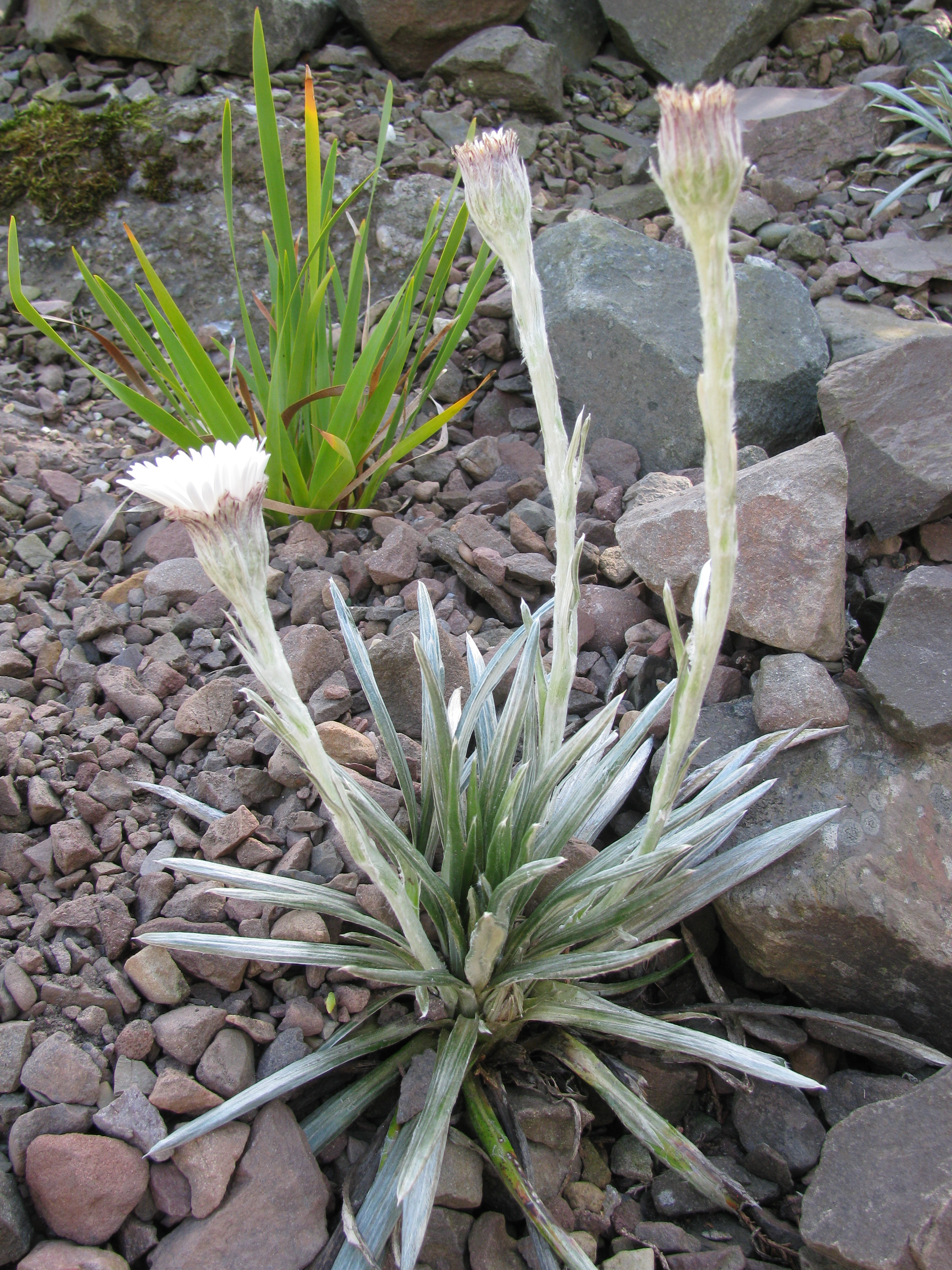

Scientific classification
- Kingdom: Plantae
- Clade: Tracheophytes
- Clade: Angiosperms
- Clade: Eudicots
- Clade: Asterids
- Order: Asterales
- Family: Asteraceae
- Genus: Celmisia
- Species: C. asteliifolia

Binomial name
- Celmisia asteliifolia Hook.fil.

= Celmisia asteliifolia =

Species of flowering plant

Celmisia asteliifolia, commonly called the silver daisy, is a species of alpine and subalpine daisy native to Australia. It grows in alpine and subalpine zones.
