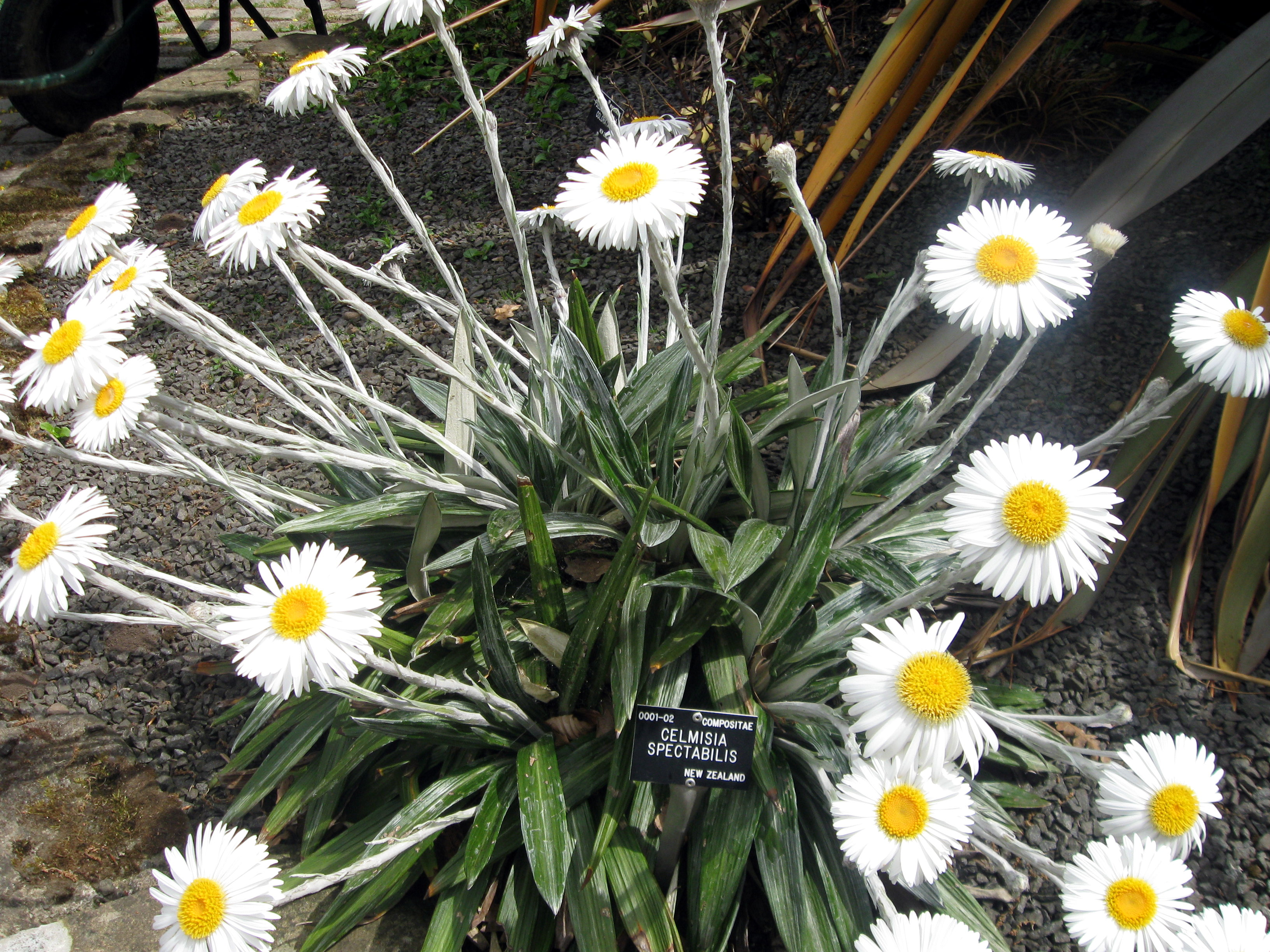

Conservation status
- Not Threatened (NZ TCS)

Scientific classification
- Kingdom: Plantae
- Clade: Tracheophytes
- Clade: Angiosperms
- Clade: Eudicots
- Clade: Asterids
- Order: Asterales
- Family: Asteraceae
- Genus: Celmisia
- Species: C. spectabilis

Binomial name
- Celmisia spectabilis Hook.f.

= Celmisia spectabilis =

Species of flowering plant

Celmisia spectabilis, also known as cotton daisy or by its Māori name puharetaiko, is a mountain daisy in the family Asteraceae, and is endemic to New Zealand, where it is one of the most widespread species in the genus Celmisia.

== Taxonomy ==
Joseph Hooker described this species in 1844, in the first volume of his Flora Antarctica. The specimens he studied were collected by the English botanist John Bidwill in 1839 on Mt Tongariro, on New Zealand's North Island.

== Description ==
C. spectabilis has is a robust plant with leathery leaves that are ovate to lanceolate or narrowly oblong, and are usually 3–18 cm long by 1–2 cm wide. They have a shiny, green upper surface, usually close to hairless except in young or North Island plants. The leaf underside is densely covered in soft, whitish or buff-coloured felted woolly hairs. The leaf margins usually roll downwards.

The leaf bases overlap and compact to form a stout pseudostem, and slowly rot away forming a damp mass that can protect young leaves from grass fires. C. spectabilis can grow as a single rosette up to 1 m wide, or several, forming mats up to 2 m across.

The flower stems reach 30 cm tall and are densely covered with loose white hairs. A showy solitary flower head, 3–5 cm across, is borne at the end of each stem. The numerous ray florets are white and the disc florets yellow.

This species hybridises with C. lyallii to form C. × pseudolyallii, which resembles C. spectabilis but with longer narrower leaves.

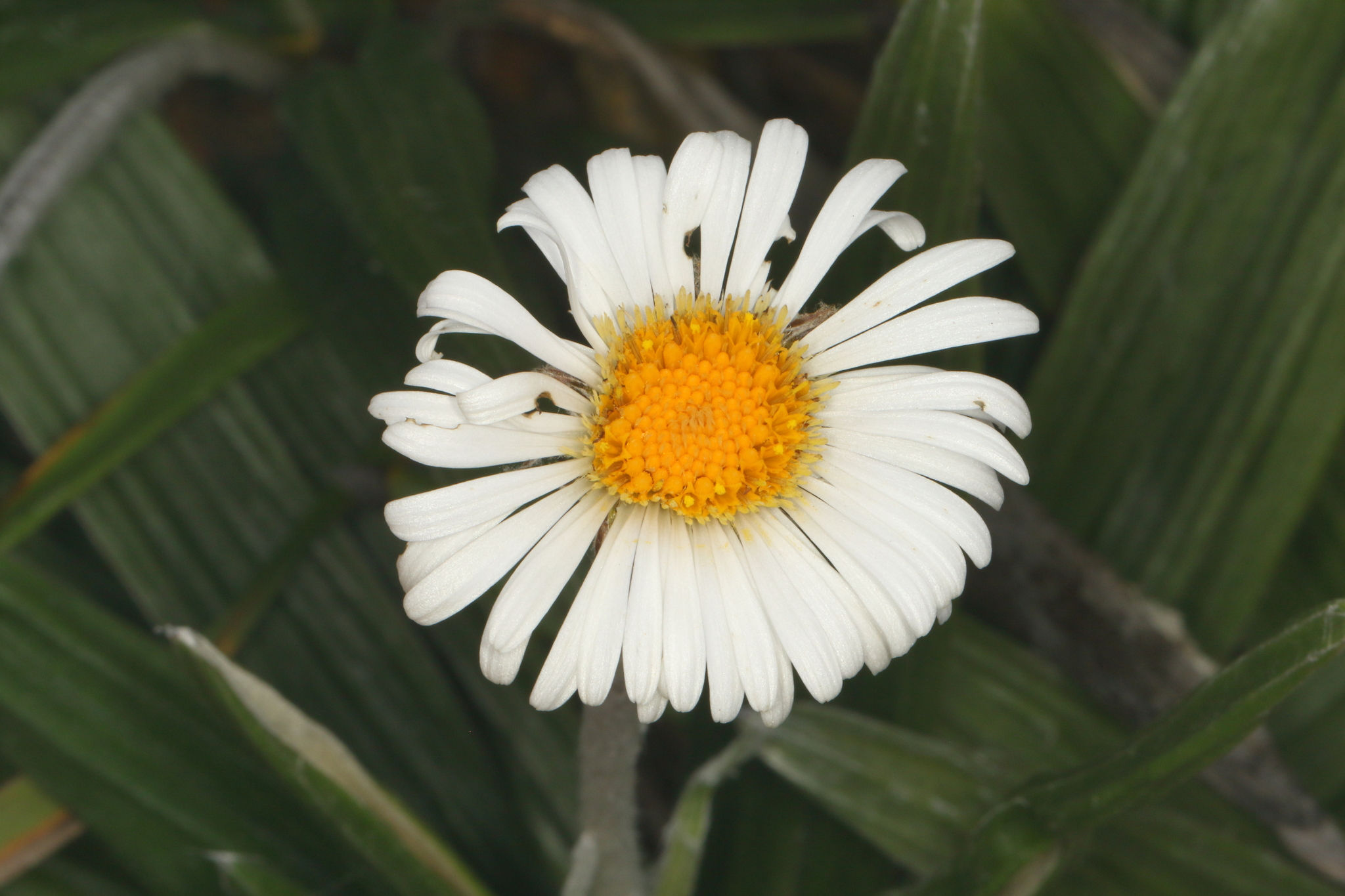
Flower

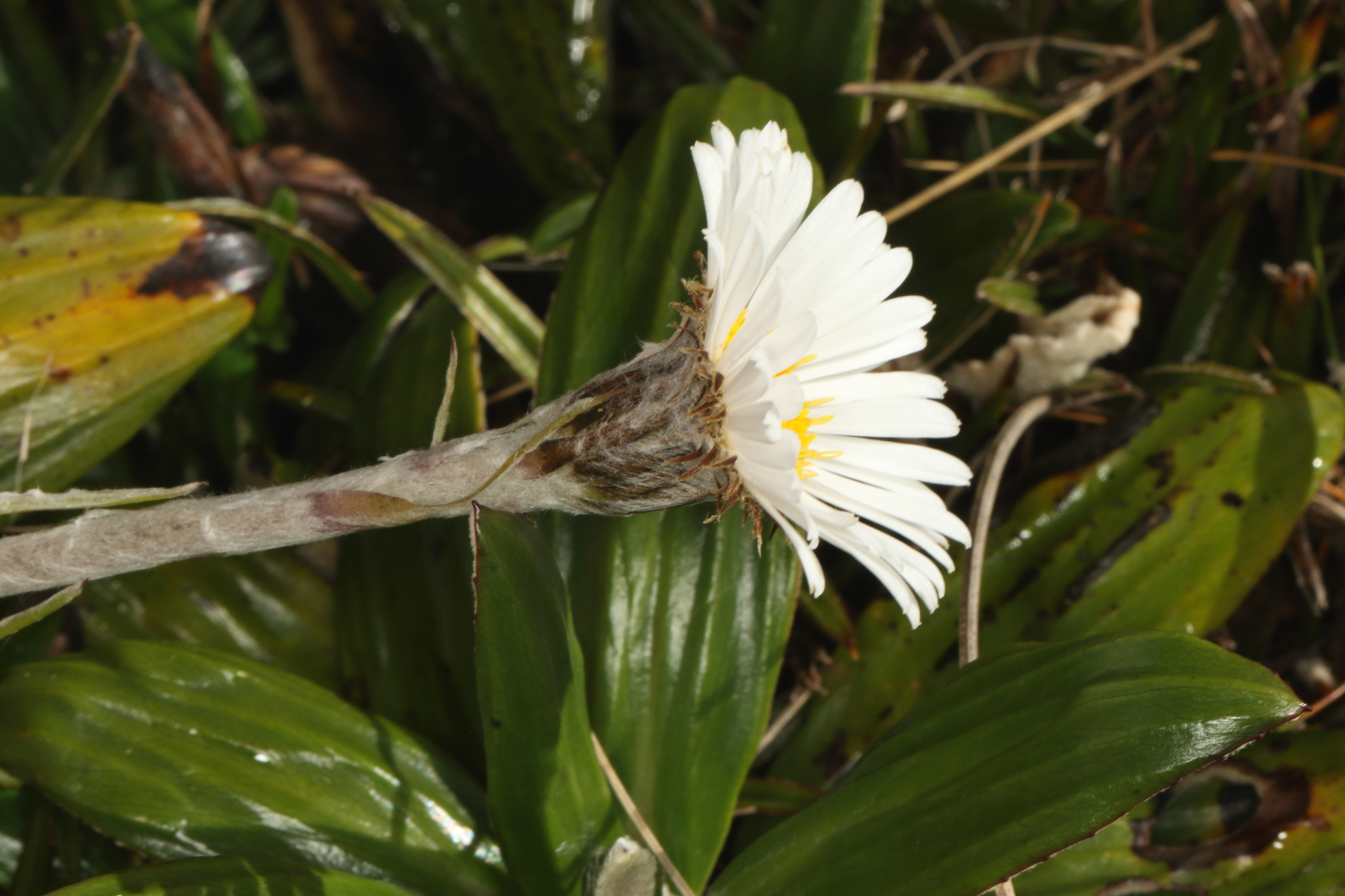
Bracts

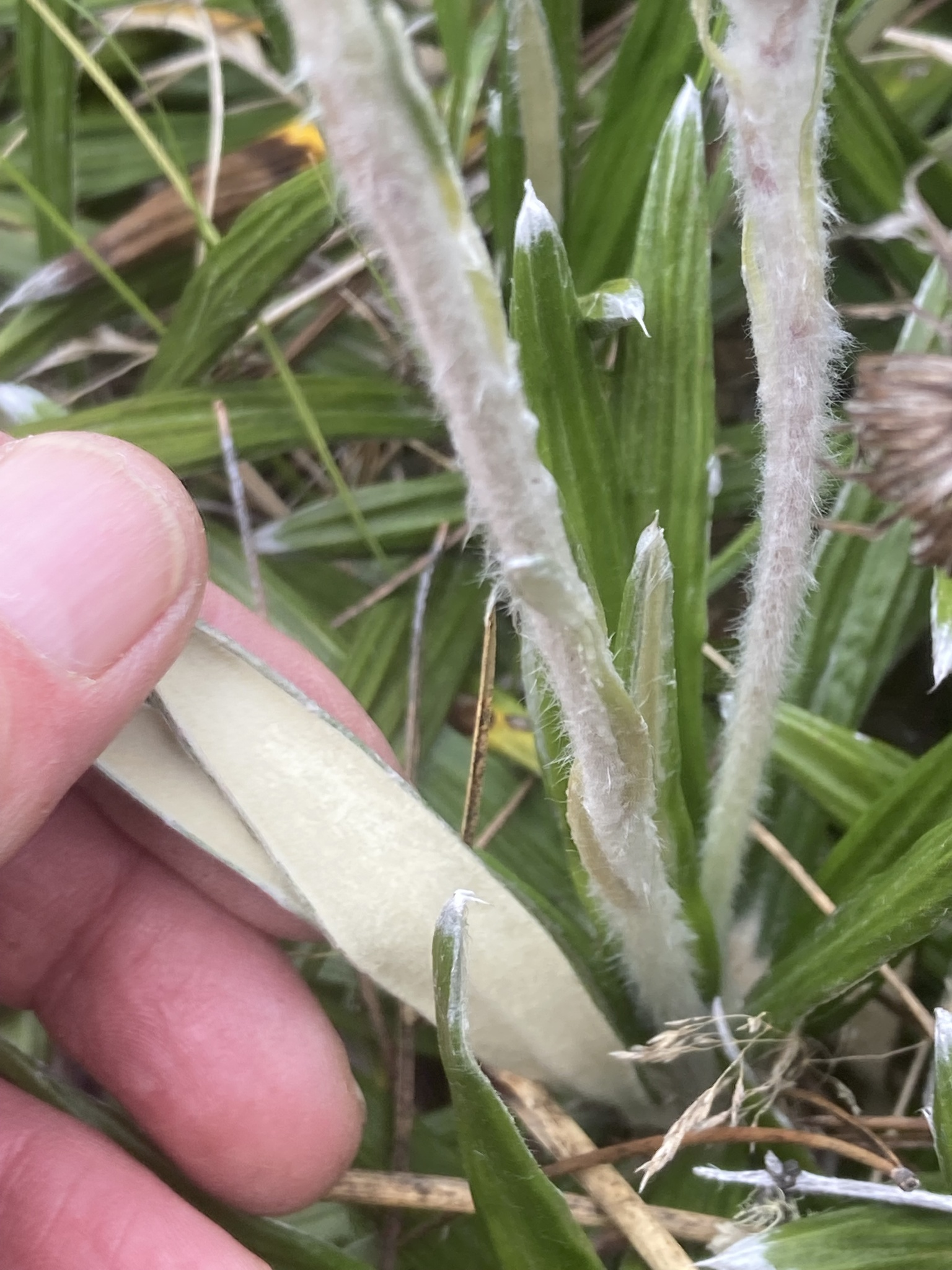
Leaf underside and flower stalks

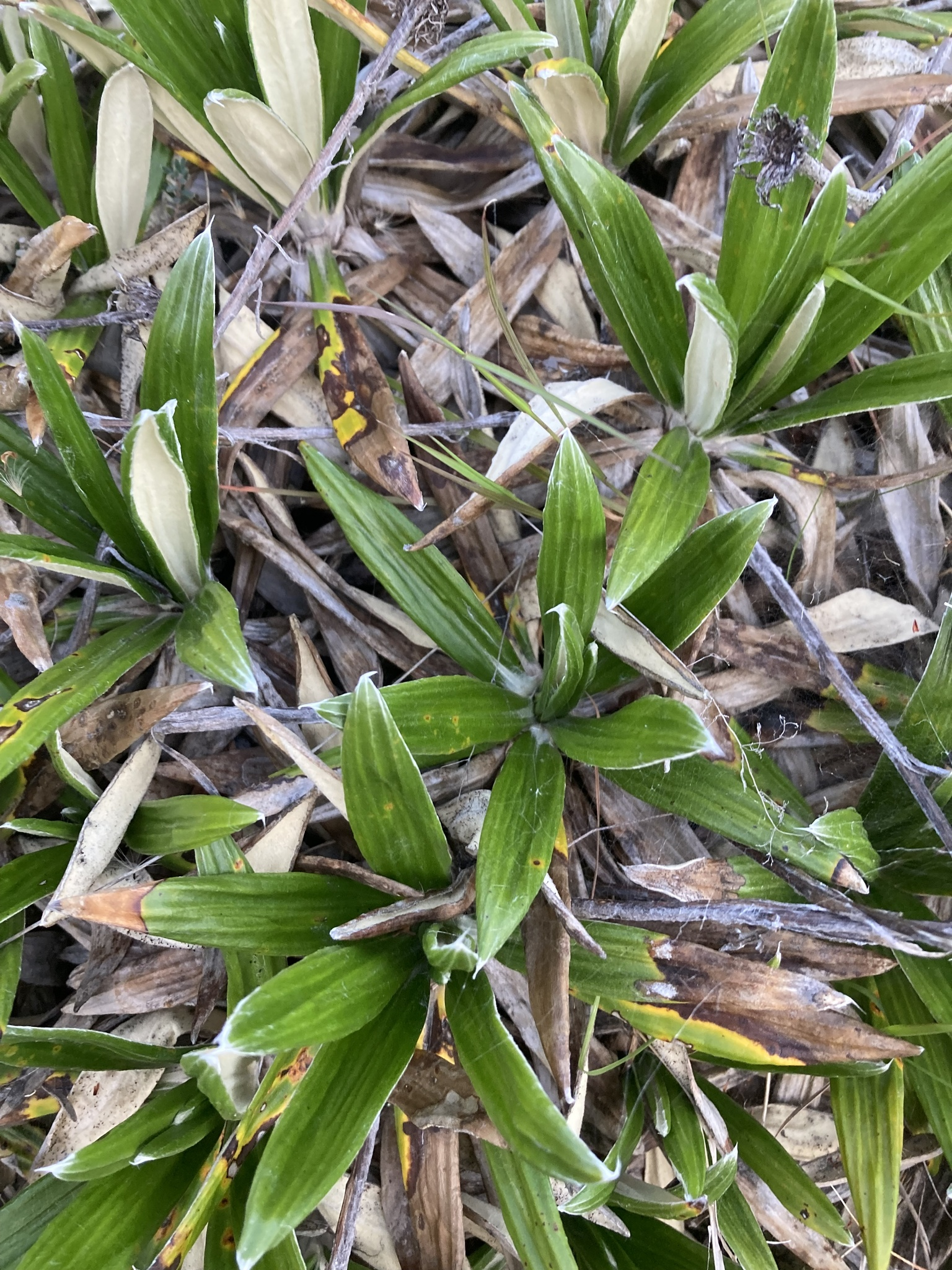
Growing as a clump

== Distribution ==
This species is found in montane to low-alpine regions (300–1700) through the both main islands, usually in the east. In the North Island it is found south of the Volcanic Plateau and Mount Hikurangi, in tussock and fellfields, and in snow tussock in the Tararua Range (but is not found in the eastern Wairarapa). In the South Island is occurs in higher-rainfall habitats from north-west Nelson to Arthur's Pass; Nelson plants are smaller and less robust than those from Canterbury. The Nelson plants were previously classified as their own variety, Celmisia spectabilis var. angustifolia, but leaf size increases gradually with latitude and there is no clear distinction.

== Ecology ==
Celmisia spectabilis flowers in early to mid summer, and has many pollinators, including Melangyna novaezelandiae and Leioproctus.

== Conservation ==
Because it was able to withstand once-frequent tussock burning, and is unpalatable to sheep, this daisy is now one of the more widespread species in the mountainous areas of New Zealand. One subspecies, Celmisia spectabilis lanceolata, is considered "At Risk—Naturally Uncommon" in the Department of Conservation NZTCS database.
