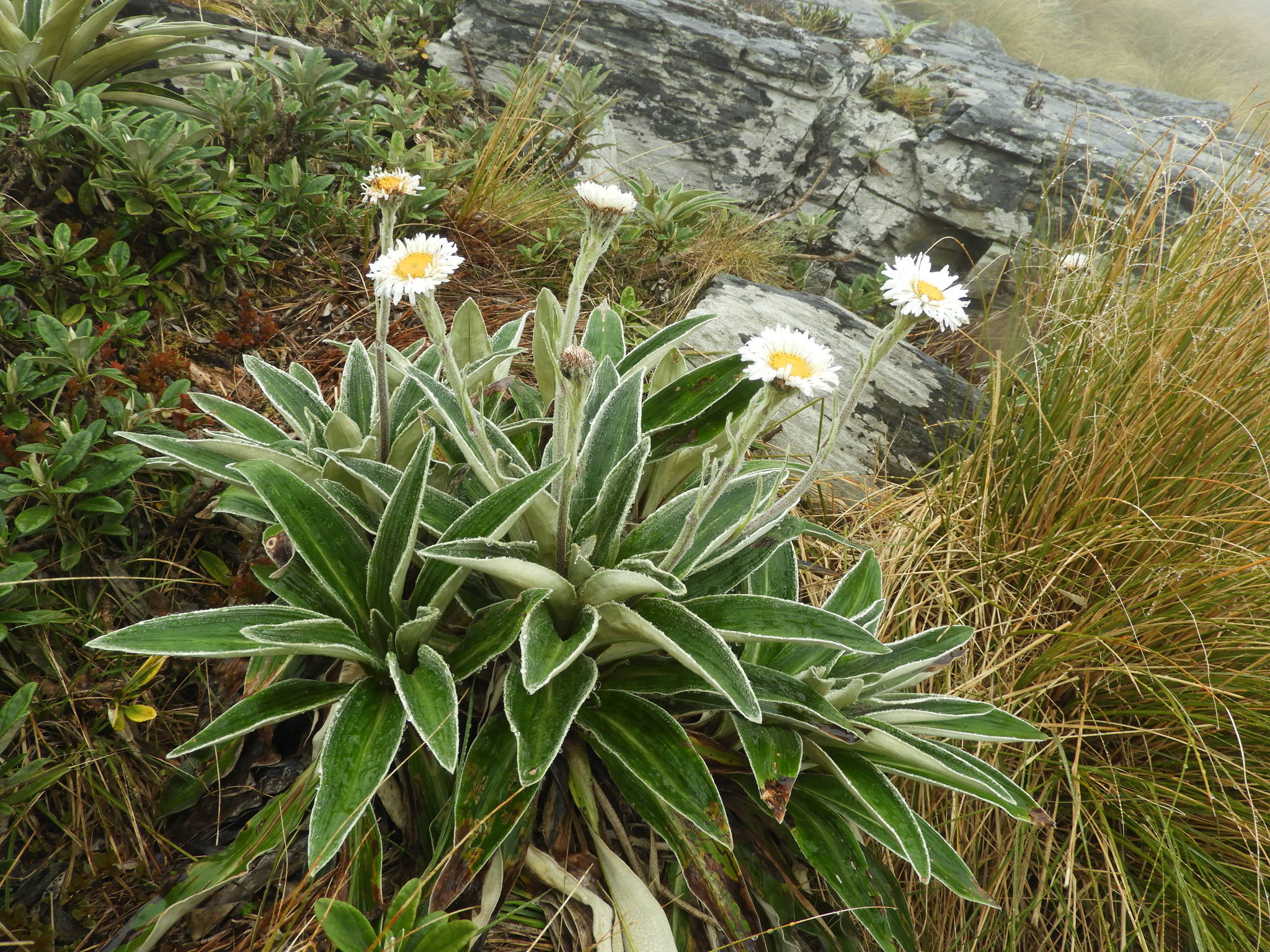

Conservation status
- Not Threatened (NZ TCS)

Scientific classification
- Kingdom: Plantae
- Clade: Tracheophytes
- Clade: Angiosperms
- Clade: Eudicots
- Clade: Asterids
- Order: Asterales
- Family: Asteraceae
- Genus: Celmisia
- Species: C. verbascifolia

Binomial name
- Celmisia verbascifolia Hook., 1853

Synonyms
- Celmisia petiolata; Celmisia brownii Chapman

= Celmisia verbascifolia =

Species of daisy

Celmisia verbascifolia is a species of daisy that is endemic to New Zealand. It was first described by Joseph Dalton Hooker in 1853.

== Taxonomy ==
Joseph Dalton Hooker first published Celmisia verbascifolia's description in Manual of the New Zealand Flora in 1853.It is split into three different subspecies, Celmisia verbascifolia subsp. membranacea, Celmisia verbascifolia subsp. rigida and Celmisia verbascifolia subsp. verbascifolia. However, New Zealand botanists prefer to maintain C. rigida as a distinct species.

== Description ==
Celmisia major var. brevis has a woody base and short branchlets. The leaves are found in groups at the tips of the branchlets, forming either a loose mat or a single rosette. The leaves are elliptic or oblong in shape, with a pale to mid-green upper surface that may be covered in fine hairs when young. The lower surface of the leaves is cream colour. The plant produces flowers with white ray petals and yellow disc florets. The fruit is an achene that is fusiform-cylindric and ribbed, and the pappus consists of bristles of unequal length.

== Distribution ==
=== subsp. membranacea ===
C. verbascifolia subsp. membranacea is endemic to Te Waipounamu in Brunner Range; Victoria Range; Spenser Mountains; along main divide south to about Amuri Pass.

=== subsp. rigida ===
This subspecies (or species) is confined to Rakiura.

=== subsp. verbascifolia ===
C. verbascifolia subsp. verbascifolia is endemic to Te Waipounamu from about Amuri Pass south along and west of main divide to Fiordland; Also in scattered localities east of the main divide especially in central Canterbury.

== Habitat ==
=== subsp. membranacea ===
The plant is alpine often found in rocky herbfields and shaded bluffs.

=== subsp. verbascifolia ===
The plant is found in areas with high rainfall. Where there is more than 2500 mm yearly rainfall it is commonly found in open grasslands but where there is less precipitation it is typically confined to cool south-facing, constantly moist sites.

== Conservation ==
It is currently ranked as "Not threatened", but C. verbascifolia subsp. rigida is "At risk - Nationally uncommon" as it is only found in Rakiura.

== Etymology ==
The generic epithet is derived from Kelmis, a mythical Dactyl from Mount Ida. Kelmis, whose name meant "casting", was a blacksmith friend of Zeus. Ovid's Metamorphoses described Kelmis as offending Zeus enough that he transformed Kelmis into adamant. The specific epithet verbascifolia means "mullein-leafed" in other words having leaves similar to Verbascum.
