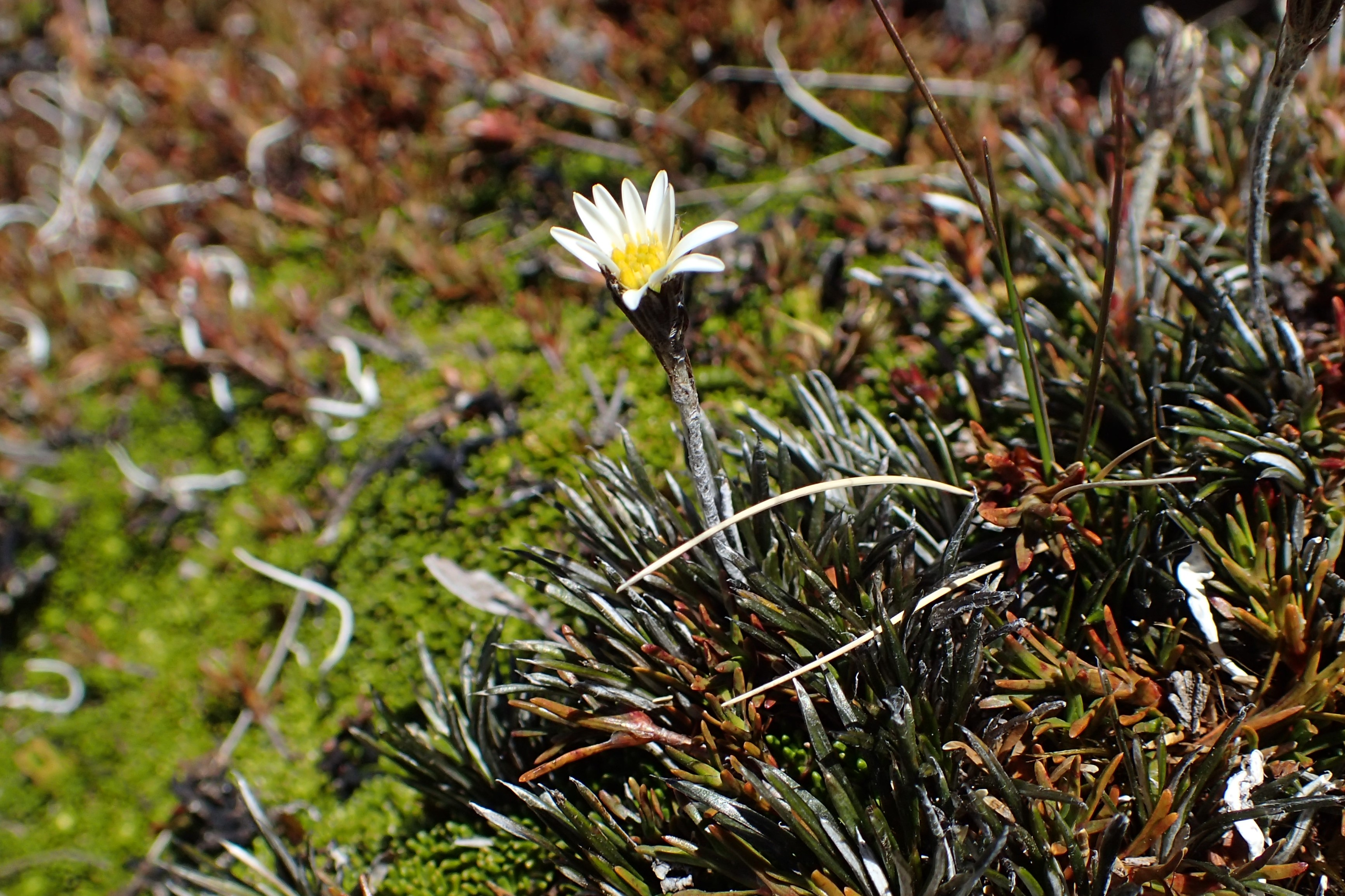
- Celmisia gracilenta at Lewis Pass, Canterbury

Scientific classification
- Kingdom: Plantae
- Clade: Embryophytes
- Clade: Tracheophytes
- Clade: Angiosperms
- Clade: Eudicots
- Clade: Asterids
- Order: Asterales
- Family: Asteraceae
- Genus: Celmisia
- Species: C. gracilenta

Binomial name
- Celmisia gracilenta Hook.f.

= Celmisia gracilenta =

Species of flowering plant

Celmisia gracilenta, commonly known by its Māori name pekapeka, is an alpine plant of Asteraceae in the genus Celmisia, found at a latitude of 37° southwards in New Zealand.

== Discovery and naming ==
Celmisia gracilenta was the first Celmisia discovered in New Zealand by botanist Joseph Banks and Daniel Solander, in March 1770, on Captain James Cook's expedition. This daisy species was discovered on hills near Queen Charlotte Sound. Celmisia gracilenta still grows in the Marlborough Sounds but is less common due to introduction of stock, game animals, and agricultural implements.

Gracilenta is Latin which means slender, and this refers to the skinny leaves of the plant. Celmisia came about from Greek mythology after being named after Kelmis one of the Idean Dactyls which is a group of skilled mythical beings associated with Mother Goddess Rhea. Kelmis means 'casting' as he was a blacksmith and friend of Zeus. Kelmis can be seen offending Zeus who turned him so he was hard as a tempered blade (flattened part of a leaf). Celmisia gracilenta can be translated into this.

== Description ==
Celmisia gracileta is a herb that is tufted and slender with tough but flexible leaves. The leaves have rolled encircled leaf sheath which are pale, thin, or slightly hairy. Celmisia gracilenta leaves are usually linear and around 10–15 cm long and 2-4mm wide. The upper leaf surface is layered with a silvery membrane and the underside is covered with white hairs. Celmisia gracilenta has grey-green leaves with a mottled appearance on the leaf surface. The leaf margin is entire or nearly so and strongly recurved. The few slender, hairy flower stems are 20–40 cm long with a couple leafy bracts with a flowerhead of 1.5–3 cm across. The flowers in the centre of the plant are disc flowers which are narrow and up to 1 cm long. This means the flowers on the outside of the plant are ray flowers which are up to 2.5 cm long. These flowers have white petals with a yellow pistil.

Celmisia gracilenta was thought to be identical with Celmisia longifolia, but it was later discovered that that it is a separate species in the Celmisia genus. The similarities between these two species has caused confusion. Compared to similar Celmisia species, Celmisia gracilenta has very slender, grass-like leaves. When comparing C. gracilenta to related species in the northern hemisphere especially, the white flowers can help differentiate the different species.

== Range ==
Celmisia gracilenta is endemic to New Zealand. The natural global range is within New Zealand in the wild.

Celmisia gracilenta is one of the Celmisia species that are found throughout New Zealand. This species is found in the North, South, and Stewart Island of New Zealand. Celmisia gracilenta is widespread below the Coromandel Peninsula to subalpine herbfield and tussockland areas. Celmisia gracilenta is around the low alpine level around 1,700 m altitude. The highest recorded presence of C. gracilenta is at 1595 m at Tukino and the lowest was in Rangipo desert at 1085 m.

== Habitat ==
Celmisia gracilenta is distributed in both islands of New Zealand with varying habitats. This plant is found in many places from open subalpine scrub to herb-fields and places with ultramafic soils for example the mineral belts in Marlborough-Nelson and Northwestern Otago. Even found in bogs throughout Te Ika-a-Māui and Te Waipounamu in the North Island. Celmisia gracilenta can be found in many different habitats. Celmisia gracilenta has leaves and stalks with soft down which protects the plant from the complex mountain climate. Celmisia gracilenta has the features that are well suited to a mountainous environment. While Celmisia gracilenta is referred to as the common mountain daisy it is also referred to as alpine vegetation. It is suggested that C. gracilenta is more tightly adapted to low alpine habitats then other habitats.

== Ecology ==
=== Life cycle/phenology ===
Celmisia gracilenta flowers in December through March. The flowers are pollinated by insects. The seeds are around 5 mm long and get attached to downy crown of hairs and this then gets dispersed by wind. Germination was found to be generally 4–6 weeks. Celmisia gracilenta are notably more common than other Celmisia species and this can shown in relation to different attributes. They have lighter seeds with more bristles, larger disc/ray flower ratios with a smaller capitula and taller scape. Celmisia gracilenta requires less light and higher temperature for germination of seeds compared to other Celmisia species. Celmisia gracilenta complex is the most challenging group and much more study is needed in terms of molecular, morphological, and taxonomic study is much needed.

=== Climate ===
Celmisia gracilenta is found in areas of varying soil types and different levels of nutrients, water and environmental conditions. Celmisia gracilenta is abundant on valley grasslands and central hill country in South Island high rainfall regions and volcanic plateau. The volcanic plateau is at lower elevation with a warmer climate, well-draining soils, high fertility, and high solar radiation. Celmisia gracilenta is found around southern eastern hill country and mountains which is higher elevation with moderate solar radiation. This eastern hill country does not always have soil present due to the landform, but when present it has moderate to low fertility and is well drained. This Celmisia prefers an environment which is slightly warmer with an annual mean temperature of 8.9 °C. This in conjunction with very well drained and highly indurated soils with large particles sizes. Annual water deficits and water balance ratio does seem to vary widely with vapor pressure deficits are usually lower. Celmisia gracilenta appears to be more a generalist in alpine areas in relation to the soil, water, and environmental conditions.

=== Predators, parasites, and diseases ===
Celmisia gracilenta is often visited by different insects and herbivores. Being New Zealand flora this makes the C. gracilenta more vulnerable to introduced herbivores. There is a variety of species that feed on the flowers and leaves of this Celmisia to gain energy. One of these species is the metalmark moth which is part of the Choreutidae family. The caterpillars feed on leaves of the Celmisia gracilenta this has been found in Southland and Otago. Another is the moths in the Geometridae family which the moth caterpillars feed on the flowers of the order of Asteraceae which includes Celmisia gracilenta. Another species is Tachinidae a fly which adults feed on flowers. Along with those flies in the Tephritidae family the fly larvae benefit by living in the flowers of C. gracilenta.
