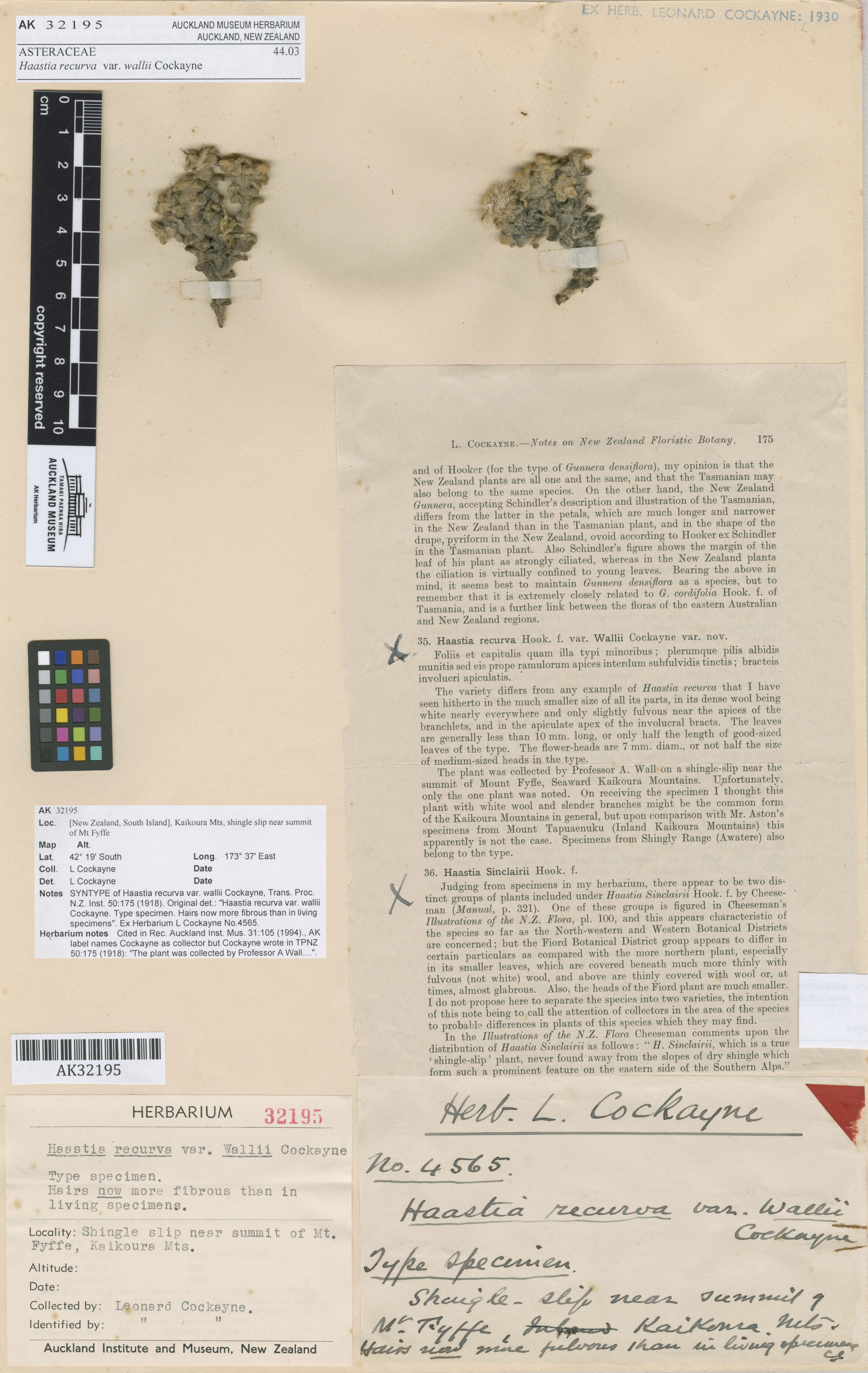
- Haastia recurva var. wallii

Scientific classification
- Kingdom: Plantae
- Clade: Tracheophytes
- Clade: Angiosperms
- Clade: Eudicots
- Clade: Asterids
- Order: Asterales
- Family: Asteraceae
- Subfamily: Asteroideae
- Tribe: Senecioneae
- Genus: Haastia; Hook.f.

= Haastia =

Genus of flowering plants

Haastia is a genus of flowering plants in the daisy family, Asteraceae, native to New Zealand.

Species

- Haastia × loganii Buchanan, hybrid of Leucogenes leontopodium × Raoulia rubra
- Haastia montana Buchanan
- Haastia pulvinaris Hook.f.
- Haastia recurva Hook.f.
- Haastia sinclairii Hook.f.

formerly included

Haastia greenii Hook.f. - Synonym of Raoulia eximia Hook.f.
