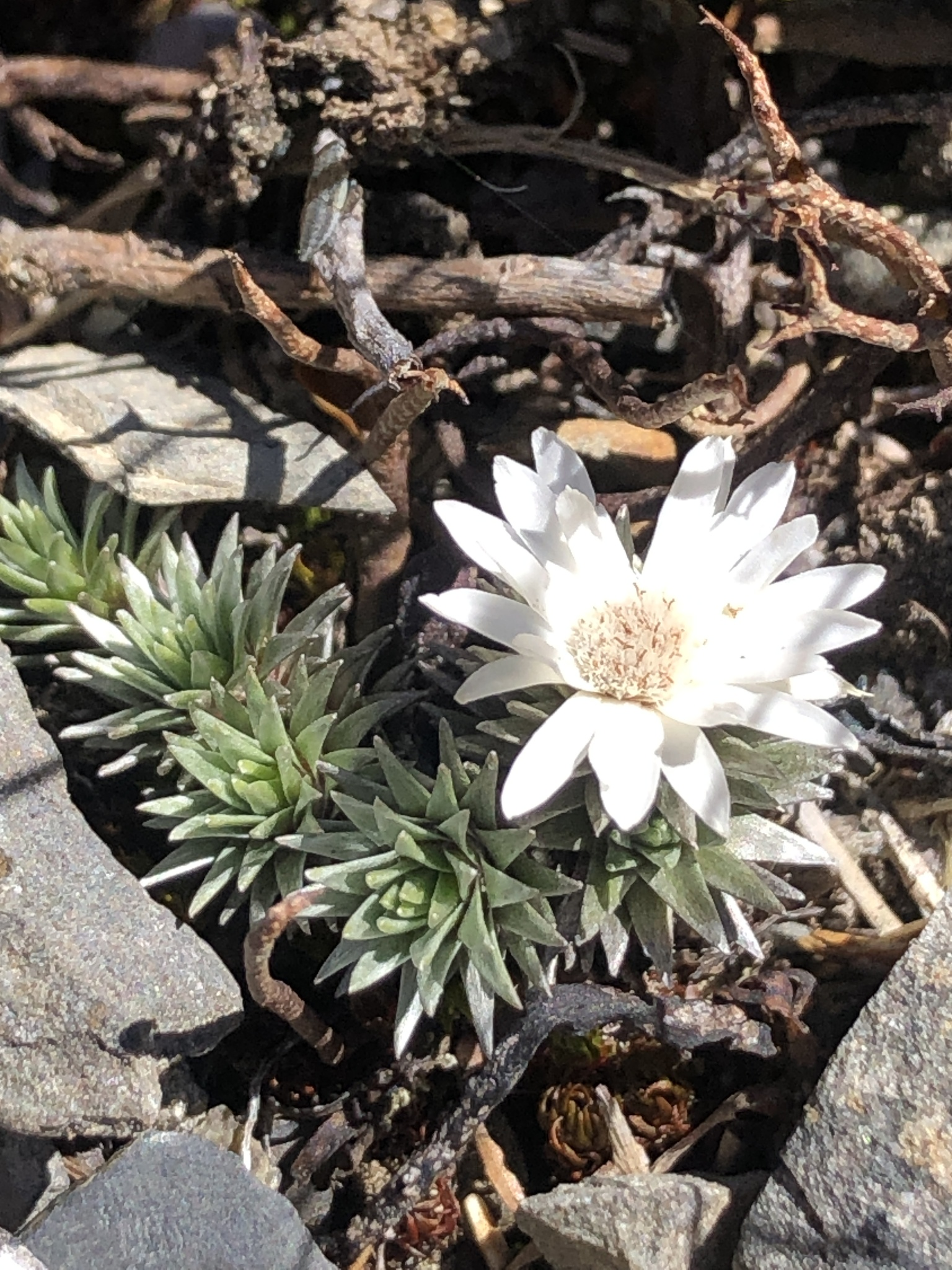
- Raoulia grandiflora in Nelson Lakes National Park

Conservation status
- Not Threatened (NZ TCS)

Scientific classification
- Kingdom: Plantae
- Clade: Tracheophytes
- Clade: Angiosperms
- Clade: Eudicots
- Clade: Asterids
- Order: Asterales
- Family: Asteraceae
- Genus: Raoulia
- Species: R. grandiflora

Binomial name
- Raoulia grandiflora Hook.f.

= Raoulia grandiflora =

Genus of flowering plants

Raoulia grandiflora, or the large-flowered mat daisy, is a species of flowering plant from the South Island of New Zealand.

== Description ==
A small, sessile flowering plant with white flowers.

Stems woody at base, much-branched; branches and branchlets densely to rather loosely arranged, the plant forming cushions or mats up to c. 15 cm. diam., occ. of more open habit. Lvs densely imbricate, 5-10 × 1-2 mm., 3-nerved, ovate-lanceolate-spathulate, tapering to subacute tip, clad in upper part on both surfaces in appressed silvery tomentum, loosely tomentose near base. Capitula up to 1·5 cm. diam.; inner phyll. linear, contracted near middle, obtuse, with conspicuous white radiate tips up to c. 5 mm. long. Florets 25-45; ♀ 8-15 with narrow slender corolla, perfect with funnelform corolla. Stylopodium prominent. Achenes &lt; 1 mm. long, clad in silky hairs; pappus-hairs c. 5 mm. long, stiff, slightly thickened at tips.

== Range ==
While some authorities consider it only a South Island species, it can also be found on the North Island south of Mt. Hikurangi in suitable habitat.

== Habitat ==
This plant is found in subalpine or subarctic biomes. Normally, it is in mountainous areas, found among rocks or near scree fields. It is also found in tussock areas and gravel fields.

== Ecology ==
This species often appears in scree fields where tussock mats leave openings. It can be found in communities with Anisotome aromatica, Celmisia laricifolia, and Cyathodes dealbata. In small hollows that accumulate water with a sandy substrate, it can be found in colluvium with Epilobium pernitens, Carpha alpina, Oreomyrrhis colensoi, and Viola cunninghamii. In tussockland it associates with Chionochloa crassiuscula and Celmisia haastii, and it can also be found in gravel areas where as much as 90% of the area is rock. In gravel fields it is known to associate with Veronica pulvinaris, Anisotome imbricata, and Dracophyllum pronum.

== Etymology ==
Grandiflora means 'large flowers' in Latin.

== Taxonomy ==
R. grandiflora is a member of the Asteraceae. It has been known to hybridize with Raoulia bryoides.
