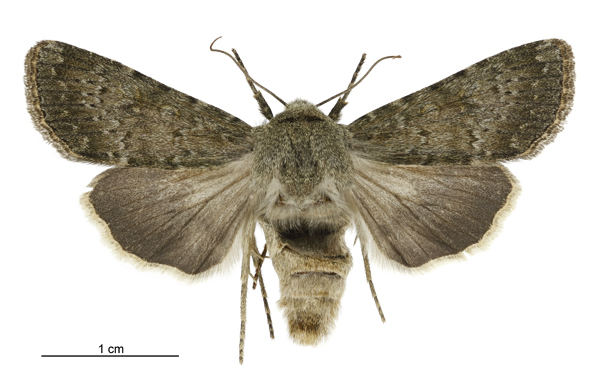
- Female
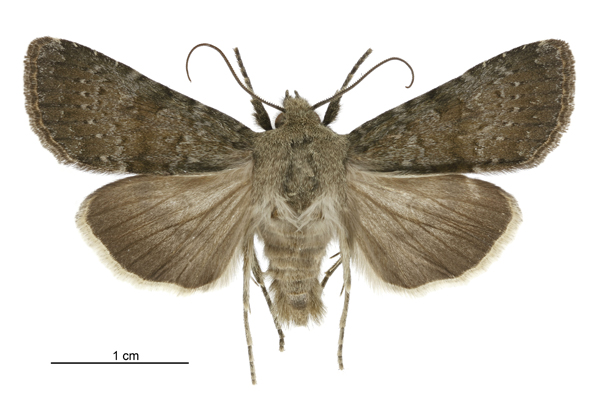
- Male

Scientific classification
- Kingdom: Animalia
- Phylum: Arthropoda
- Clade: Pancrustacea
- Class: Insecta
- Order: Lepidoptera
- Superfamily: Noctuoidea
- Family: Noctuidae
- Genus: Ichneutica
- Species: I. moderata

Binomial name
- Ichneutica moderata (Walker, 1865)

Synonyms
- Agrotis? moderata Walker, 1858; Mamestra griseipennis Felder & Rogenhofer, 1875; Aletia moderata (Walker, 1858); Graphania moderata (Walker, 1858); Graphania griseipennis (Felder & Rogenhofer, 1875); Aletia (s.l.) moderata (Walker, 1858); Mythimna moderata (Walker, 1858)

= Ichneutica moderata =

Species of moth

Ichneutica moderata is a moth of the family Noctuidae. This species is endemic to New Zealand and can be found from the Bay of Plenty south including the Chatham Islands. I. moderata inhabits open spaces in lowland to montane zones. Larvae likely feed on a variety of low growing herbaceous plants including on Raoulia species. Larvae create silk covered tunnels in the roots of their host plants. Pupa are enclosed in a loose silken cocoons and are sheltered amongst the host species roots. The adult moths are on the wing from October to April.

== Taxonomy ==
This species was first described by Francis Walker in 1865 using specimens collected in Nelson by Mr T. R. Oxley. Walker was unsure of the genus and so named the species Agrotis? moderata. The lectotype specimen is held by the Natural History Museum, London. Rudolf Felder and Alois Friedrich Rogenhofer also described this species, assuming it was new, in 1875 and named it Mamestra griseipennis. This name was synonymised with Aletia moderata by J. S. Dugdale in 1988. In 2019, Robert Hoare undertook a major review of New Zealand Noctuidae. During this review, the genus Ichneutica was greatly expanded and the genus Aletia was subsumed into that genus as a synonym. As a result of the review, this species is now known as Ichneutica moderata.

== Description ==
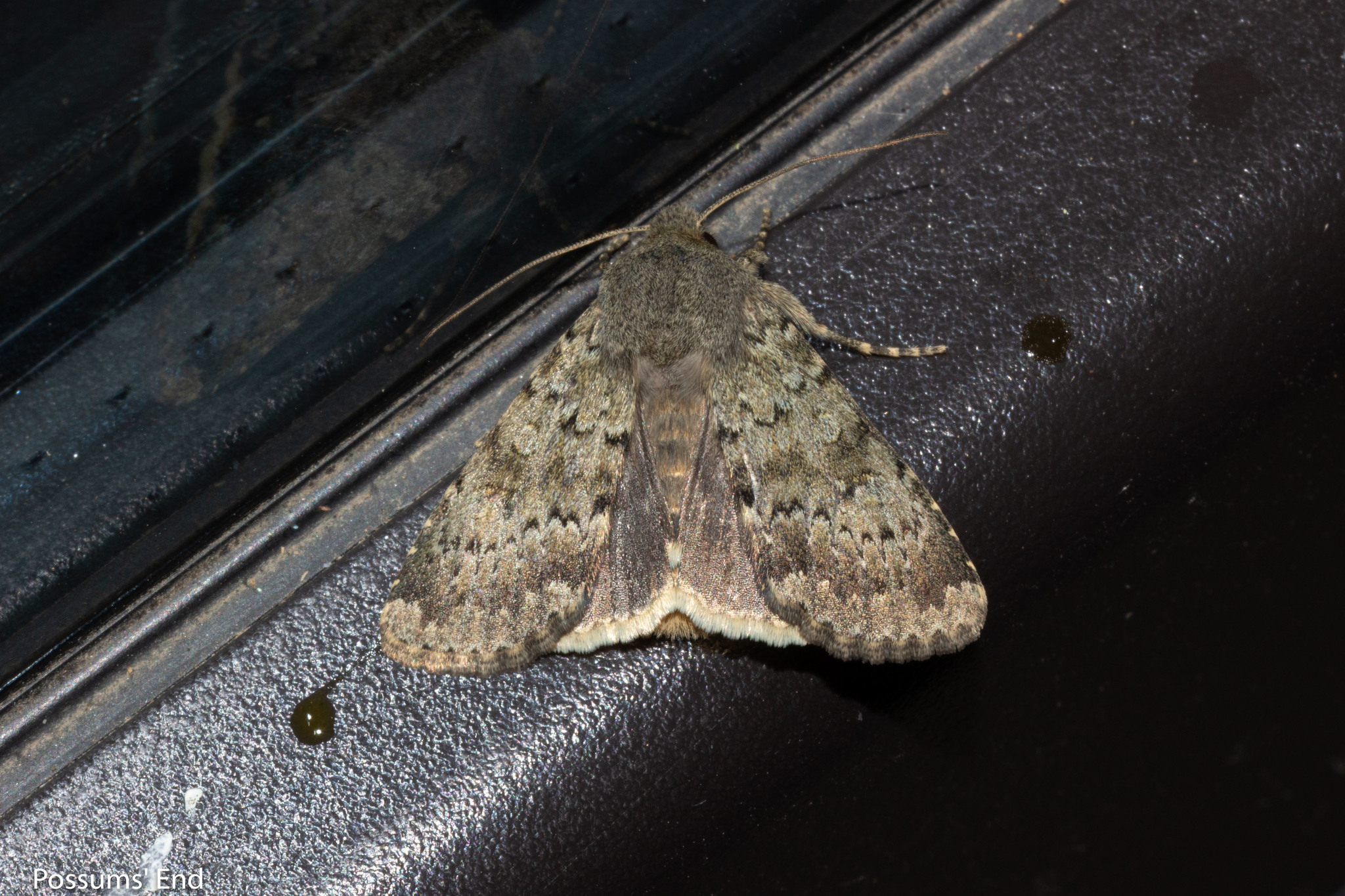
Ichneutica moderata showing the diagnostic creamy white fringe on the hindwings.

Walker described this species as follows:

Male and female. Dark cinereous, cinereous beneath. Palpi slightly ascending, extending a little beyond the head; second joint densely pilose; third elongate-conical, not more than one-third of the length of the second. Antennae of the male pubescent, setulose. Abdomen of the male extending rather beyond the hind wings; apical tuft subquadrate. Fore wings with four irregular lines composed of black lunules; first and second lines on the inner side of a diffuse blackish band; third and fourth beyond the band, undulating, approximate to each other; submarginal line cinereous, dentate, continued in the male to the exterior border; marginal lunules black. Hind wings brown; fringe pale cinereous. Length of the body 8 — 9 lines; of the wings 19 — 20 lines.

The adult male of the species has a wingspan of between 33 and 38 mm, the female has a wingspan of between 36 and 43 mm. This species is undistinguished, but can be differentiated from other similar appearing species as both the male and female have unmarked creamy white fringes on their hindwings.

Hudson described the larvae of the species as follows:

The length of the full-grown larva is about 1 3/8 (35 mm.), stout, cylindrical, slightly tapering at each end; back pale dull reddish; sides dull greenish, speckled and suffused with blackish; underside clear, pale, dull green. Head ochreous-brown, with two conspicuous blackish-brown stripes; thoracic segments pale greenish-brown; second segment with elongate-oval blackish-brown horny dorsal plate; other thoracic segments with rudimentary dorsal plates. General surface somewhat wrinkled. A conspicuous series of trapezoidal black marks on the back of segments 5-11, faintly posteriorly; segments 12 and 13 darker on back; a narrow, pale reddish dorsal line; a double series of highly polished warts on each abdominal segment, except the last, and a single series on each thoracic segment. Spiracles black.

== Distribution ==
This species is found throughout New Zealand, including the Chatham Islands, with the only exception being the northern part of the North Island, that is Bay of Plenty north.

== Habitat ==
I. moderata prefers open habitats in the montane to lowlands zones.

== Behaviour ==
Adults of this species are on the wing from October to April. They are attracted to light and have been collected via a mercury vapour light trap.

== Life history and host species ==
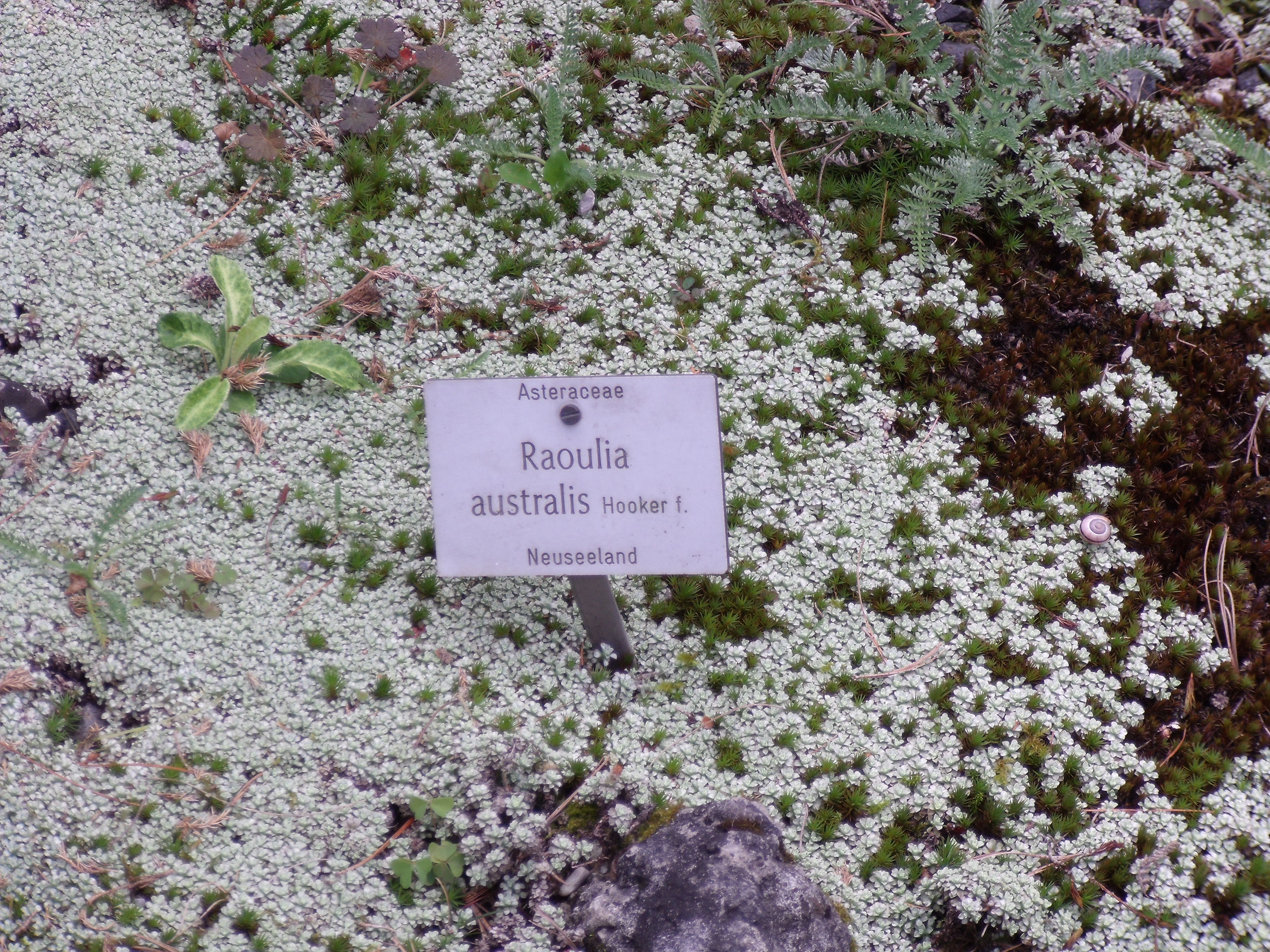
Raoulia australis

The larvae of this species likely feed on low growing herbaceous plants. However, I. moderata larvae are recorded as being associated with Raoulia particularly the species R. australis, R. subulata and R. beauverdii as well as Crassula manaia. Larvae have also been reared on Bellis perennis. Larvae create tunnels lined with silk amongst the roots of the species' host plants. Pupa are enclosed in an insubstantial and easily damaged silken cocoon amongst the roots.
