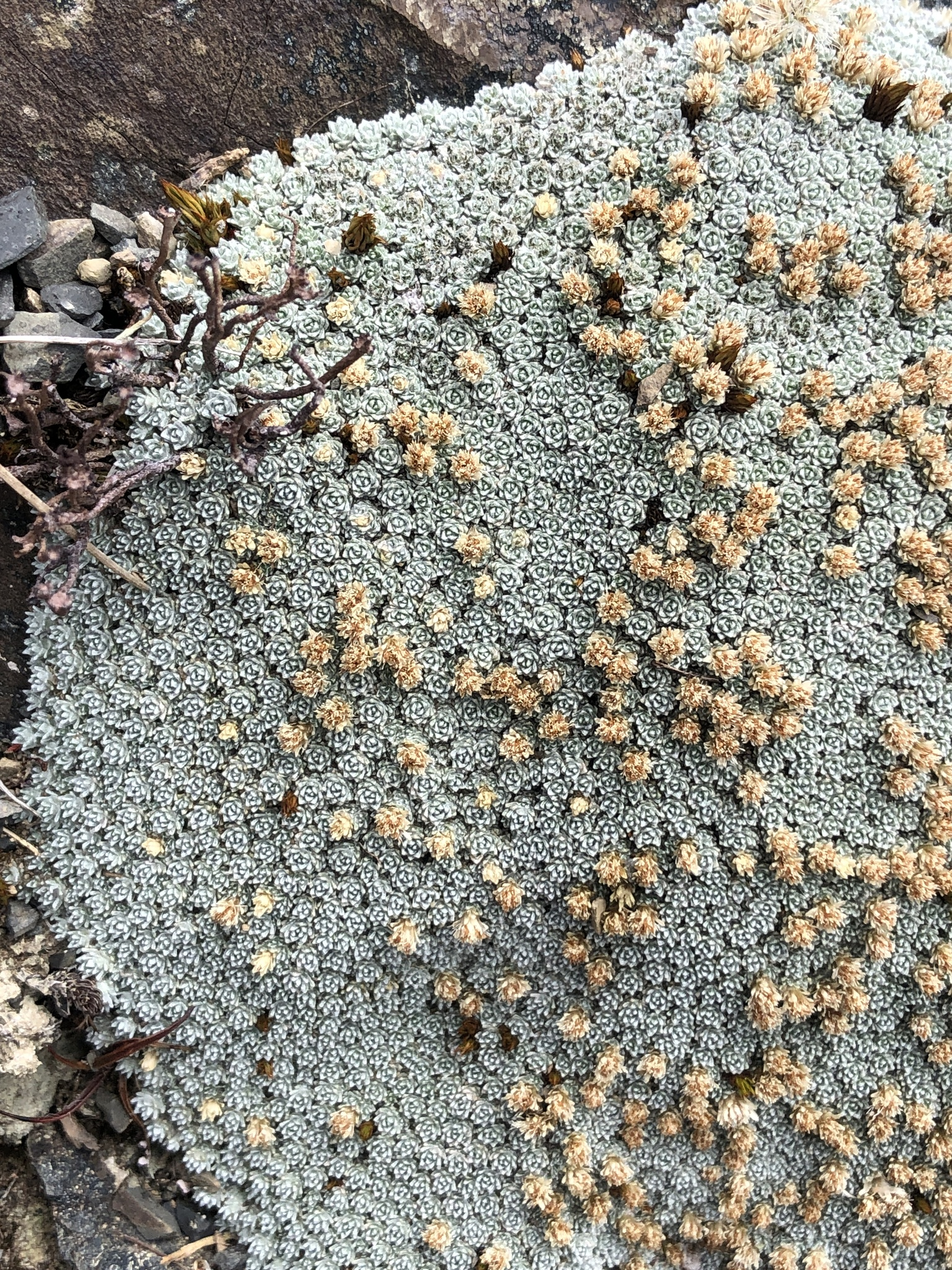
- Raoulia bryoides in Nelson Lakes National Park

Conservation status
- Not Threatened (NZ TCS)

Scientific classification
- Kingdom: Plantae
- Clade: Embryophytes
- Clade: Tracheophytes
- Clade: Angiosperms
- Clade: Eudicots
- Clade: Asterids
- Order: Asterales
- Family: Asteraceae
- Genus: Raoulia
- Species: R. bryoides

Binomial name
- Raoulia bryoides Hook.f.

= Raoulia bryoides =

Species of flowering plant

Raoulia bryoides is a species of sessile plant from New Zealand.

== Description ==
A small flowering plant with gray leaves and yellow to off-white flowers. Raoulia byroides grows as if it were a moss - a prostrate, sessile growth that hugs the ground. That's one of the reasons it is named bryoides, too.

== Range ==
New Zealand, only in the South Island in montane areas.

== Habitat ==
Montane, alpine, and subalpine habitats.

== Ecology ==
This plant often grows in communities near Raoulia grandiflora and Haastia pulvinaris.

== Etymology ==
bryoides means 'moss-like' in Latin.
