= Raoulia beauverdii =

- Raoulia beauverdii in Central Otago

Conservation status
- Declining (NZ TCS)

Scientific classification
- Kingdom: Plantae
- Clade: Tracheophytes
- Clade: Angiosperms
- Clade: Eudicots
- Clade: Asterids
- Order: Asterales
- Family: Asteraceae
- Genus: Raoulia
- Species: R. beauverdii

Binomial name
- Raoulia beauverdii Cockayne

Species of flowering plant

Raoulia beauverdii is a species of flowering plant in the family Asteraceae. It is a dense, low-growing, spreading plant that grows in a mat-like form. Leaves are arranged in an overlapping pattern and have a silvery-grey colour. It is endemic to the South Island of New Zealand. R. beauverdii's 2023 assessment in the New Zealand Threat Classification System was "At Risk – Declining".

== Description ==
Raoulia beauverdii is a low-growing, perennial, spreading plant in the family Asteraceae. It grows along the ground like a mat and forms loose to compact patches up to 1 metre (3 feet 3 inches) across. The stems are up to 0.5 mm in diameter, dark brown, thread-like, and wiry, producing numerous elongated roots from the leaf nodes. Branches are usually 5–20 mm long, growing at a slight upward angle or spreading outwards. Leaves are arranged from loosely to tightly overlapping along the stems and branches. They measure 2–5 mm long and 0.2–1 mm wide, are silvery-grey to grey, and range from linear to spoon-shaped. Their tips are blunt to rounded and the edges are rolled inwards.

Capitula (flower heads) are 4–6 mm in diameter and contain 10–15 florets (small flowers) which are pale cream in colour. The bracts are arranged in 3–4 rows and are usually dark brown in colour. Cypselae (specialised fruits of the Asteraceae) are 0.8–0.9 mm long, brownish to grey-brown in colour, and egg-shaped to oval-shaped. The pappi (feathery seed-like structures) are 3–3.2 mm long. R. beauverdii has a diploid chromosome count of 56.

== Taxonomy ==
Raoulia beauverdii was first described by the New Zealand botanist Leonard Cockayne in 1913. It was first published in the Transactions and Proceedings of the New Zealand Institute in 1914. R. beauverdii and R. apicinigra were both classified by Allan (1961) as R. hookeri var. apicinigra and were not recognised as distinct taxa. Ward (1993) found that the two species differ in chromosome numbers and ecological traits, and are therefore considered separate species. R. beauverdii is categorised in the subgenus Raoulia.

=== Etymology ===
Raoulia is named in honour of the French naturalist and naval surgeon Étienne Raoul.

== Distribution ==
Raoulia beauverdii is endemic to the South Island of New Zealand. It is sparingly found on the eastern side of the island in the Canterbury Region, Otago, and the Southland Region. R. beauverdii's 2023 assessment in the New Zealand Threat Classification System was "At Risk – Declining".

=== Habitat ===
Raoulia beauverdii is found in coastal, lowland, and montane environments, from 0–500 m (0–1,640 ft) above sea level. R. beauverdii has been recorded growing in coastal dunes and in dry inland sites within tussock grasslands. It typically occurs on limestone scree and loess deposits derived from calcareous rocks, as well as near exposed limestone and schist outcrops.

== Ecology ==
The extent of self-pollination in Raoulia species is unknown. Raoulia seeds are readily dispersed by the wind. The larvae of the New Zealand moth Ichneutica moderata creates tunnels in the roots of selected Raoulia species, including R. beauverdii.

== Works cited ==
Books

- Allan, H.H (1961). Flora of New Zealand. Vol. 1. P D Hasselberg Government Printer Publications. ISBN 9780477010566.
- Hoare, Robert J. B. (2019). "Noctuinae (Insecta: Lepidoptera: Noctuidae) Part 2: Nivetica, Ichneutica". Fauna of New Zealand. 80: 1–455. doi:10.7931/J2/FNZ.80.

Journals

- Breitwieser, Ilse; Ward, Josephine M. (2003). "Phylogenetic relationships and character evolution in New Zealand and selected Australian Gnaphalieae (Compositae) inferred from morphological and anatomical data". Botanical Journal of the Linnean Society. 141 (2): 183–203. doi:10.1046/j.1095-8339.2003.00141.x. ISSN 1095-8339.
- Buxton, Max; Kleier, Catherine; Lord, Janice (2016). "Variation in reproductive investment and floret gender ratios in two gynodioecious mat daisies (Raoulia, Asteraceae)". New Zealand Journal of Botany. 54 (1): 74–86. doi:10.1080/0028825X.2015.1133662. ISSN 0028-825X.
- Cockayne, Leonard (1914). Transactions and Proceedings of the New Zealand Institute. Vol. 46. New Zealand Institute.
- Spence, John R. (1990). "Seed rain in grassland, herbfield, snowbank, and fellfield in the alpine zone, Craigieburn Range, South Island, New Zealand". New Zealand Journal of Botany. 28 (4): 439–450. doi:10.1080/0028825X.1990.10412327. ISSN 0028-825X.
- Ward, Josephine. M (1993). "Systematics of New Zealand Inuleae (Compositae‐Asteraceae)—2 A numerical phenetic study of Raoulia in relation to allied genera". New Zealand Journal of Botany. 31 (1): 29–42. doi:10.1080/0028825X.1993.10419532. ISSN 0028-825X.
- Ward, Josephine (1982). "A Field Guide to Raoulia". Canterbury Botanical Society Journal. 33–41: 33.

Websites

- De Lange, Peter (2026). "Raoulia beauverdii". New Zealand Plant Conservation Network.
- "Raoulia beauverdii Cockayne". Plants of the World Online. 2026 – via Royal Botanic Gardens, Kew.
