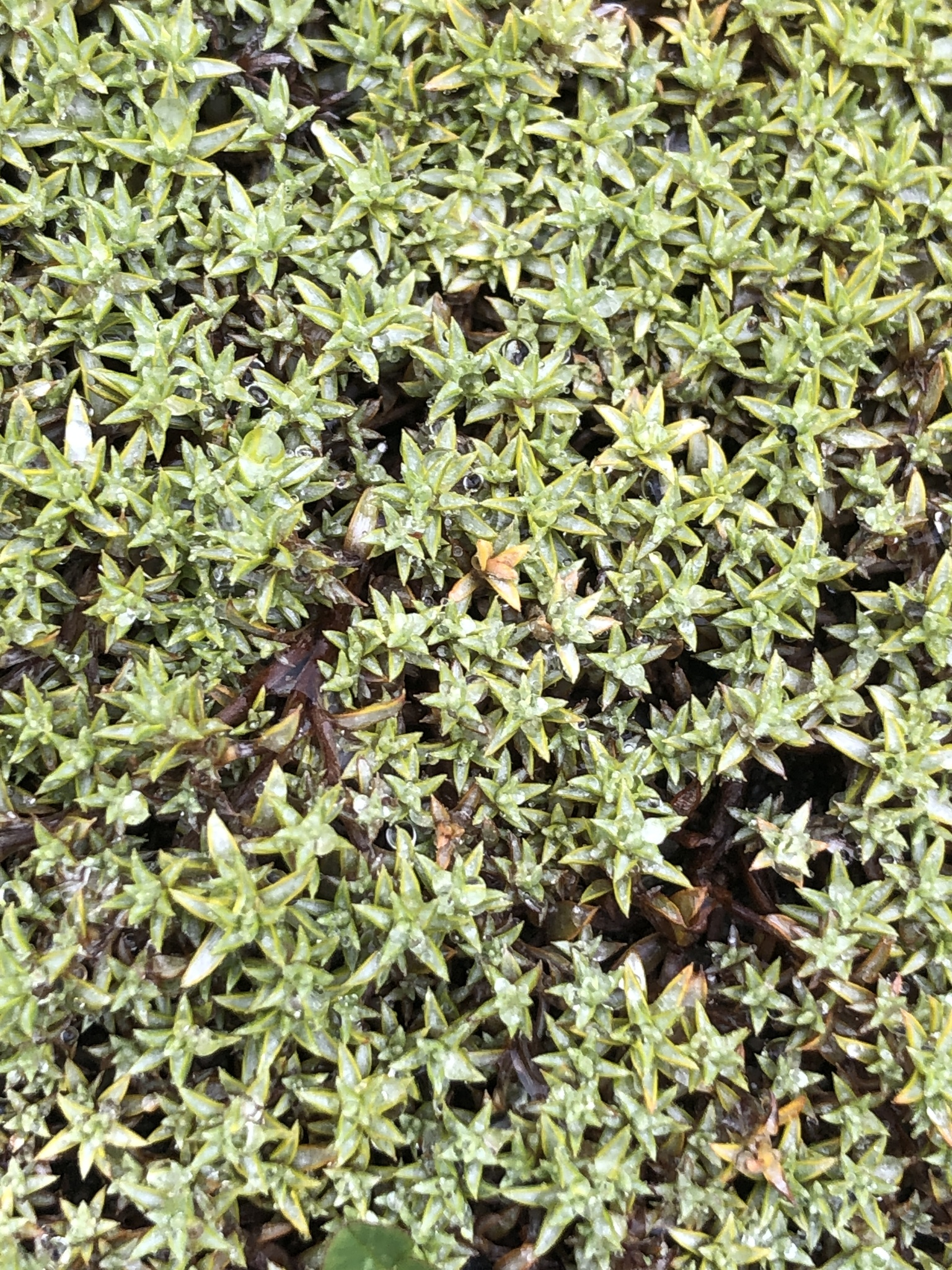
- Raoulia tenuicaulis in Nelson Lakes National Park

Conservation status
- Not Threatened (NZ TCS)

Scientific classification
- Kingdom: Plantae
- Clade: Embryophytes
- Clade: Tracheophytes
- Clade: Angiosperms
- Clade: Eudicots
- Clade: Asterids
- Order: Asterales
- Family: Asteraceae
- Genus: Raoulia
- Species: R. tenuicaulis

Binomial name
- Raoulia tenuicaulis Hook.f.

= Raoulia tenuicaulis =

Species of flowering plant

Raoulia tenuicaulis, known as the tutahuna in Te reo or mat daisy, is a species of flowering plant, endemic to New Zealand. It is the most widespread Raoulia, and grows mainly in riverbeds.

== Description ==
A small shrub that grows on mats in river-beds. It forms mats up to 1m in size.

== Distribution and habitat ==
Raoulia tenuicaulis is known from across New Zealand, on both the North and South Island. It thrives in stony riverbeds in both montane and lowland regions.

It is not considered threatened in its range.

== Ecology ==
Raoulia tenuicaulis is known to host Cuscuta epythymum.

== Etymology ==
tenuicaulis means 'thin-stem' in Latin. The description also includes the note that it is thin-stemmed, so presumably this is why the name was chosen.

== Taxonomy ==
Raoulia tenuicaulis contains the following varieties:

- Raoulia tenuicaulis var. tenuicaulis
- Raoulia tenuicaulis var. dimorpha
- Raoulia tenuicaulis var. pusilla

However, these are suspect, as the form can change with the growth pattern.

The type series is uncertain, but a lectotype was gathered by William Colenso in 1863.
