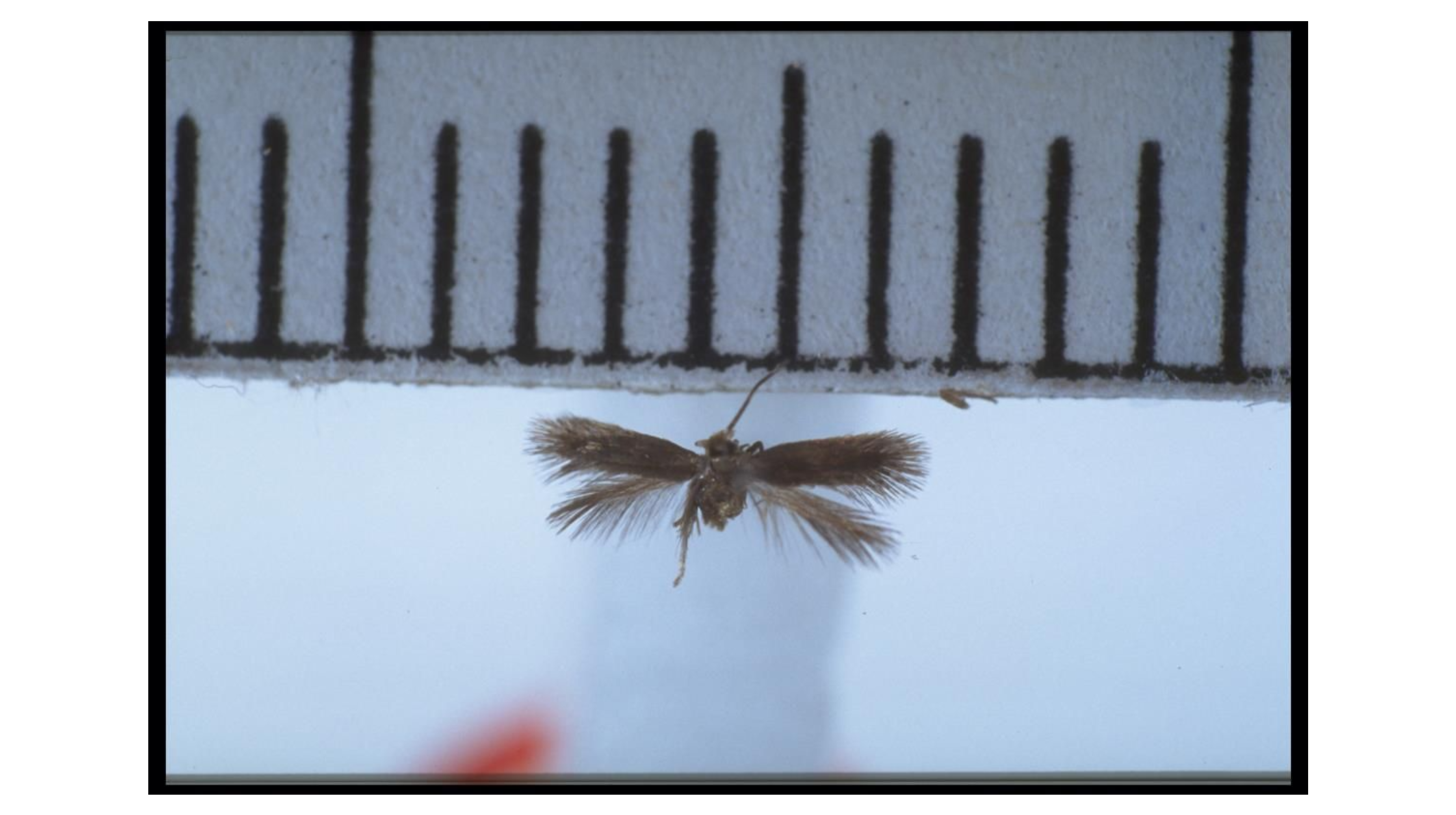
- Male holotype

Scientific classification
- Kingdom: Animalia
- Phylum: Arthropoda
- Clade: Pancrustacea
- Class: Insecta
- Order: Lepidoptera
- Family: Nepticulidae
- Genus: Stigmella
- Species: S. childi

Binomial name
- Stigmella childi Donner & Wilkinson, 1989

= Stigmella childi =

Species of moth endemic to New Zealand

Stigmella childi is a species of moth of the family Nepticulidae. It is endemic to New Zealand and has been observed in the southern parts of the South Island. This species inhabits subalpine and alpine grassland and herbfields. The larvae of this species are leaf miners and feed on the leaves of Celmisia haastii. Adults have been observed on the wing in January.

== Taxonomy ==
This species was first described in 1989 by Hans Donner and Christopher Wilkinson from specimens collected in Fiordland. The male holotype specimen, collected at Lake McKenzie in the Murchison Mountains, at 1200 m altitude on the 10 January 1984 by B.H. Patrick, is held in the New Zealand Arthropod Collection.

== Description ==
Donner and Wilkinson described the adult male of this species as follows:

Head. Frontal tuft and scape rusty brown; collar brown-grey; antenna brownishgrey, comprising 30 segments. Thorax grey-brown. Forewing about 2 mm long, grey brown, lustrous, reflecting gold; fringe grey. Hindwing and fringe pale grey. Abdomen brown-grey.

They described the adult female of the species as follows:

Head. Frontal tuft orange; scape and collar buff. Thorax buff. Forewing buff, lustrous, reflecting silver, with a terminal dark grey area. Abdomen buff.

== Distribution ==
This species is endemic to New Zealand and has been observed in the South Island.

== Habitat ==
This species inhabits subalpine and alpine grassland and herbfields, the preferred habitat of their host plant.

== Behaviour ==
The larvae of this species mine the leaves of their host plant. Adults are on the wing in January.

== Host ==
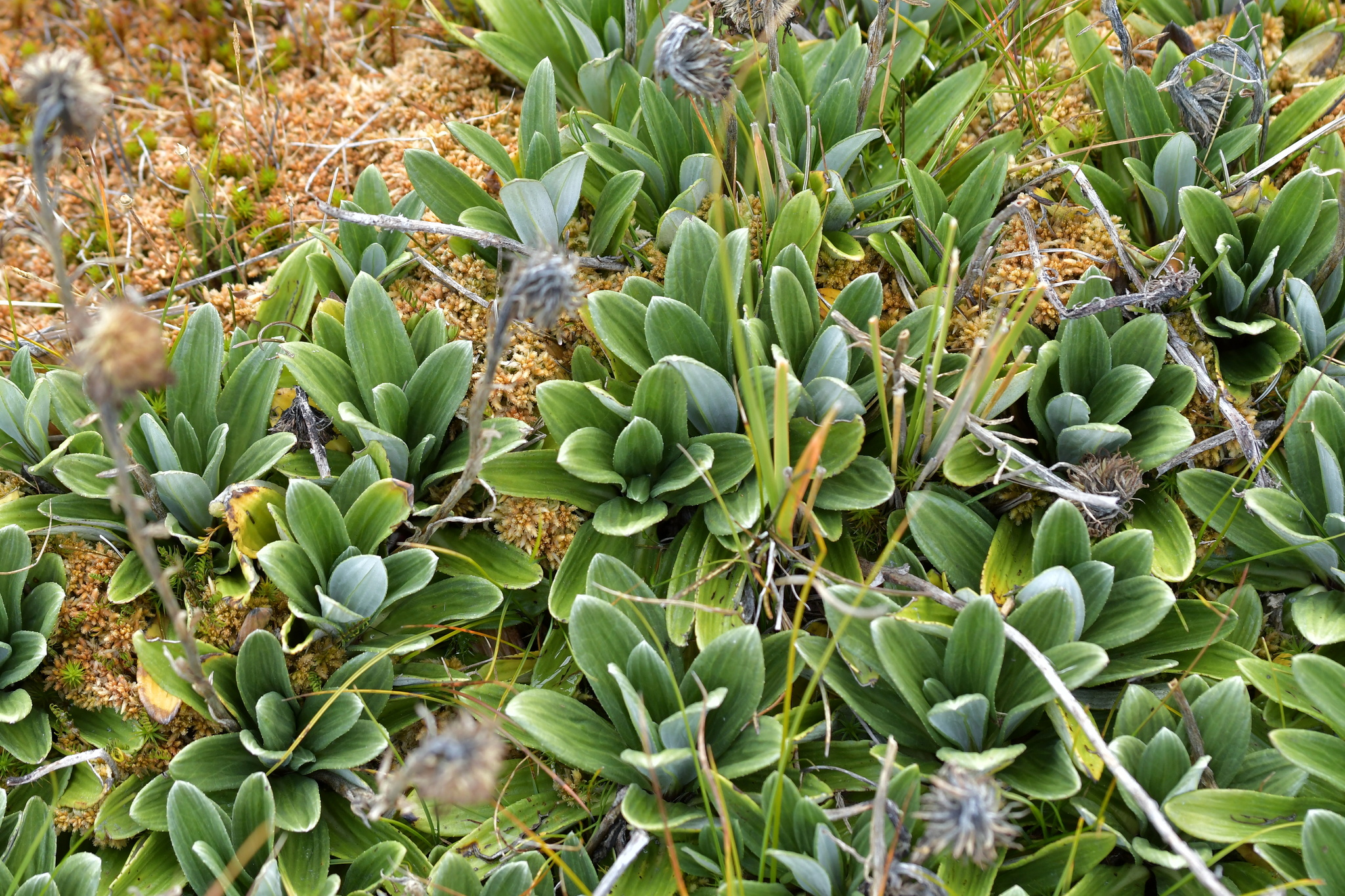
Larval host C. haastii.

The larvae feed on the leaves of Celmisia haastii.
