= Raoulia parkii =

- Foliage of Raoulia parkii

Conservation status
- Declining (NZ TCS)

Scientific classification
- Kingdom: Plantae
- Clade: Tracheophytes
- Clade: Angiosperms
- Clade: Eudicots
- Clade: Asterids
- Order: Asterales
- Family: Asteraceae
- Genus: Raoulia
- Species: R. parkii

Binomial name
- Raoulia parkii Buchanan

Species of flowering plant

Raoulia parkii, commonly known as the celadon mat daisy, is a species of flowering plant in the family Asteraceae. It is a low-growing, mat-like plant that is pale green in colour and has relatively large, firm leaves compared with other members of Raoulia. R. parkii is endemic to New Zealand, where it occurs along the eastern side of the South Island. R. parkii's 2023 assessment in the New Zealand Threat Classification System was "At Risk – Declining".

== Description ==
Raoulia parkii is a low-growing, mat-like plant in the family Asteraceae. The branchlets grow upright. Leaves are broad, measuring 3–5 mm in length and about 2 mm across. They are larger and firmer than other members of Raoulia. They overlap closely with one another, and have tips that curve outwards or backwards. Capitula (flower heads) are small, measuring 4–7 mm in diameter. R. parkii, is mostly covered in pale yellow to yellowish-green hairs, which give it a pale green appearance. R. parkii has a diploid chromosome count of 84.

== Taxonomy ==
Raoulia parkii was first described by John Buchanan in 1882 in the Transactions and Proceedings of the New Zealand Institute. According to Ward (1993), R. parkii is most closely related to R. subsericea, although the latter differs morphologically in its brighter green appearance. Both species are categorised in the subgenus Raoulia.

=== Etymology ===
Raoulia is named in honour of the French naturalist and naval surgeon Étienne Raoul. The specific epithet (second part of the scientific name), parkii, is named in honour of the geologist James Park. The species is commonly known as the celadon mat daisy.

== Distribution ==
Raoulia parkii is endemic to New Zealand, where it is found on the eastern side of the South Island. It has been recorded at multiple sites in the Canterbury Region and Otago. Buchanan said in his original description that the plant is also found in the North Island, although there is no confirmation of this. R. parkii's 2023 assessment in the New Zealand Threat Classification System was "At Risk – Declining".

=== Habitat ===
Raoulia parkii is primarily found in upland to subalpine environments. It grows in exposed habitats, including rocky sites, dry grasslands and alpine fellfields.

== Works cited ==
Books

- Allan, H.H (1961). Flora of New Zealand. Vol. 1. P D Hasselberg Government Printer Publications. ISBN 9780477010566.
- Cheeseman, T. F. (1906). Manual of the New Zealand flora (1 ed.). Wellington, New Zealand: New Zealand Board of Science and Art.

Journals

- Buchanan, John (1882). Transactions and Proceedings of the New Zealand Institute. Vol. 14. New Zealand Institute.
- Breitwieser, Ilse; Ward, Josephine M. (2003). "Phylogenetic relationships and character evolution in New Zealand and selected Australian Gnaphalieae (Compositae) inferred from morphological and anatomical data". Botanical Journal of the Linnean Society. 141 (2): 183–203. doi:10.1046/j.1095-8339.2003.00141.x. ISSN 1095-8339.
- Ward, Josephine. M (1993). "Systematics of New Zealand Inuleae (Compositae‐Asteraceae)—2 A numerical phenetic study of Raoulia in relation to allied genera". New Zealand Journal of Botany. 31 (1): 29–42. doi:10.1080/0028825X.1993.10419532. ISSN 0028-825X.
- Ward, Josephine (1982). "A Field Guide to Raoulia". Canterbury Botanical Society Journal. 33–41: 33.

Websites

- De Lange, Peter (2026). "Raoulia parkii". New Zealand Plant Conservation Network.
- "Raoulia parkii Buchanan". Plants of the World Online. 2026 – via Royal Botanic Gardens, Kew.
