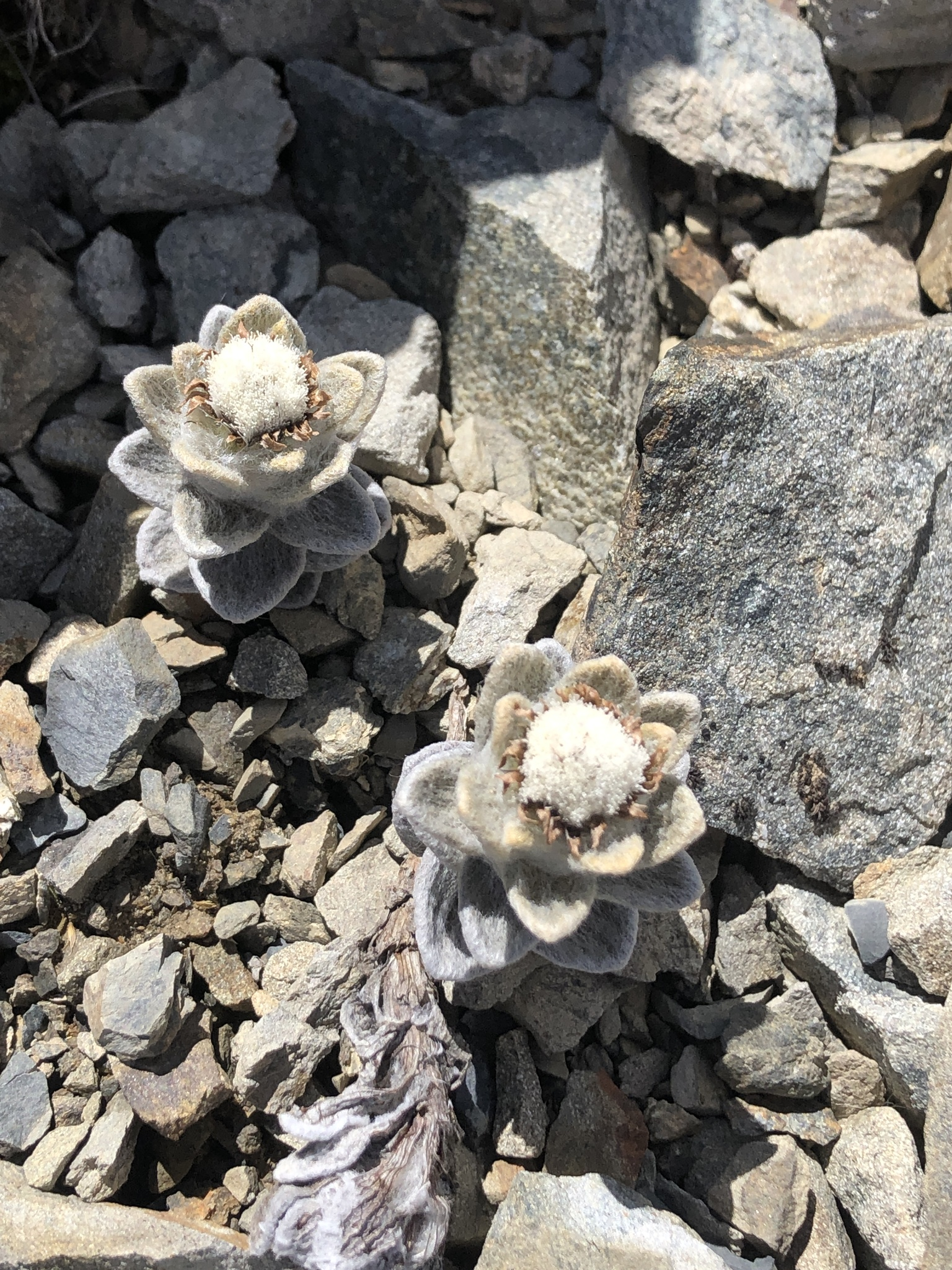
- Haastia sinclairii in Nelson Lakes National Park

Conservation status
- Not Threatened (NZ TCS)

Scientific classification
- Kingdom: Plantae
- Clade: Embryophytes
- Clade: Tracheophytes
- Clade: Angiosperms
- Clade: Eudicots
- Clade: Asterids
- Order: Asterales
- Family: Asteraceae
- Genus: Haastia
- Species: H. sinclairii

Binomial name
- Haastia sinclairii Hook.f.

= Haastia sinclairii =

Species of flowering plant

Haastia sinclairii is a species of small flowering plant in the South Island of New Zealand.

== Description ==
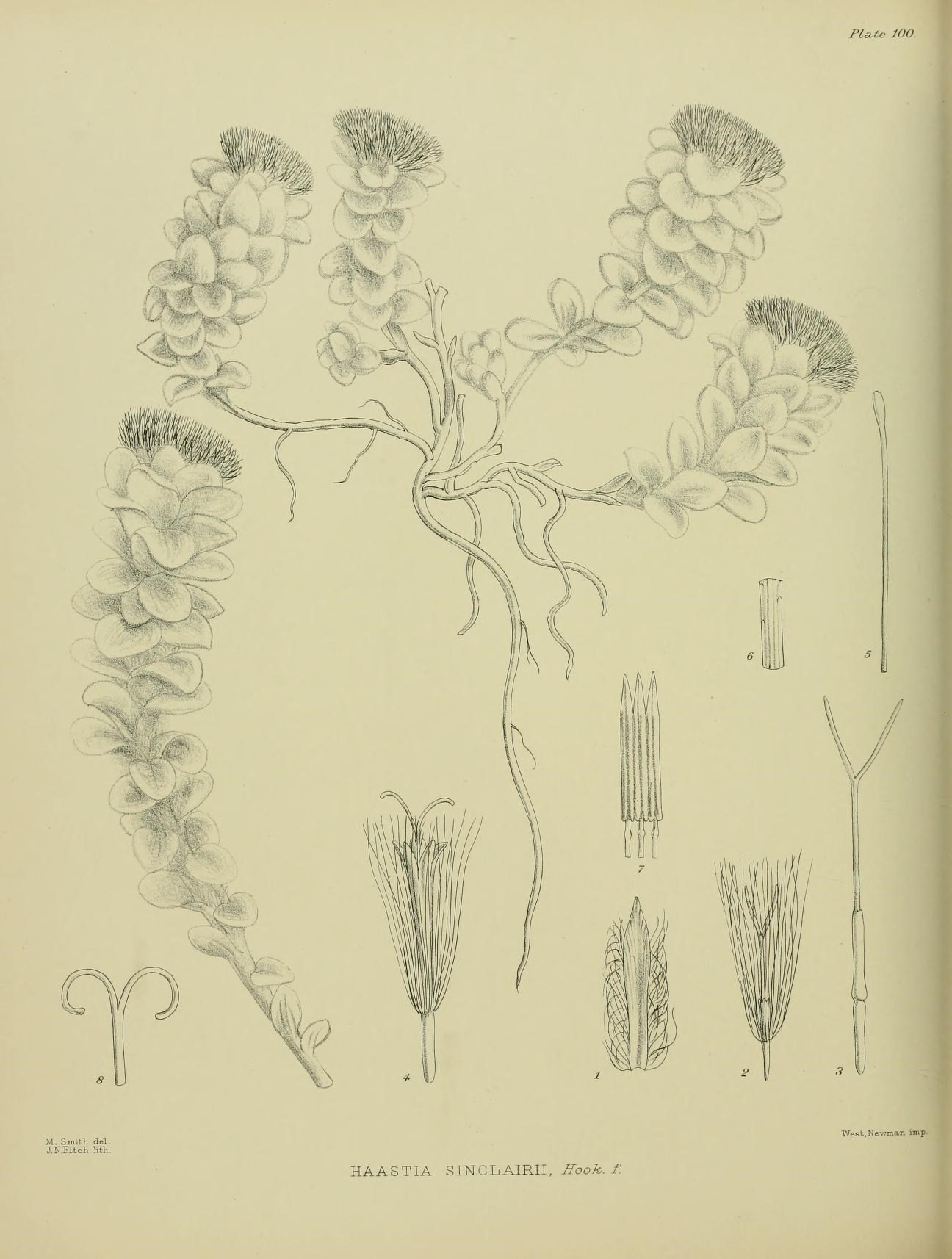
Illustration of H. sinclairii by Matilda Smith

A small, green plant with a single stem and leaves that seem to surround the stem in slightly revolving circles, with a white flower that can have orange or yellow petals on the outer rim. Prostrate.

Allan (1961) described the species this way:

Plant sparingly to much branched, decumbent to suberect. Branchlets up to c. 30 cm. long, 4–6 mm. diam. Lvs ± patent, up to 3·5 × 1·5 cm., oblong-obovate, subacute to rounded at apex, densely clad in whitish subappressed tomentum, except on adaxial surface of appressed base, upper part slightly thickened, somewhat rugose; veins 5–10, anastomosing above. Capitula c. 3 cm. diam.; receptacle 5–6 mm. diam. Phyll. narrow-oblanceolate, subacuminate, pilose on abaxial surface, c. 1 cm. long. Achenes c. 2 mm. long, narrow-linear. Pappus up to 1 cm. long.

== Range ==
Its known range is in the South Island of New Zealand.

== Habitat ==
Alpine and subalpine habitats. Scree fields, in particular.

== Taxonomy ==
Haastia sinclairii contains the following varieties:

- Haastia sinclairii var. sinclairii
- Haastia sinclairii var. fulvida

It is in a clade together with Haastia recurva. The genus was named after Julius von Haast.
