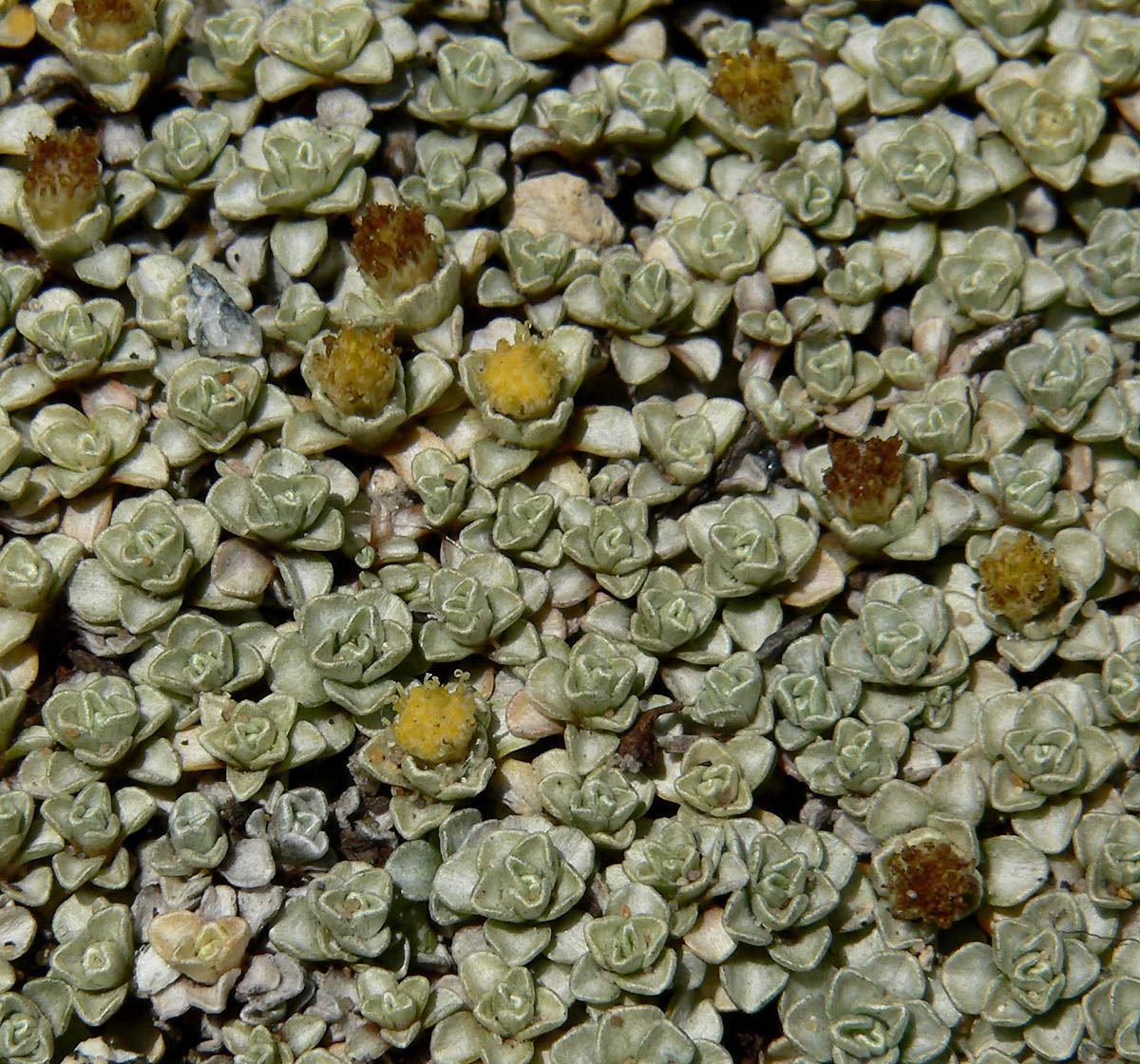

Scientific classification
- Kingdom: Plantae
- Clade: Tracheophytes
- Clade: Angiosperms
- Clade: Eudicots
- Clade: Asterids
- Order: Asterales
- Family: Asteraceae
- Genus: Raoulia
- Species: R. hookeri

Binomial name
- Raoulia hookeri Allan

= Raoulia hookeri =

Species of plant

Raoulia hookeri, also called scabweed and mat daisy, is a species of mat-forming plant.

== Description ==
Raoulia hookeri is a mat-forming small perennial with tiny yellow flowers, and silver leaves. The flowers form in summer, and result in a daisy-like seed head.

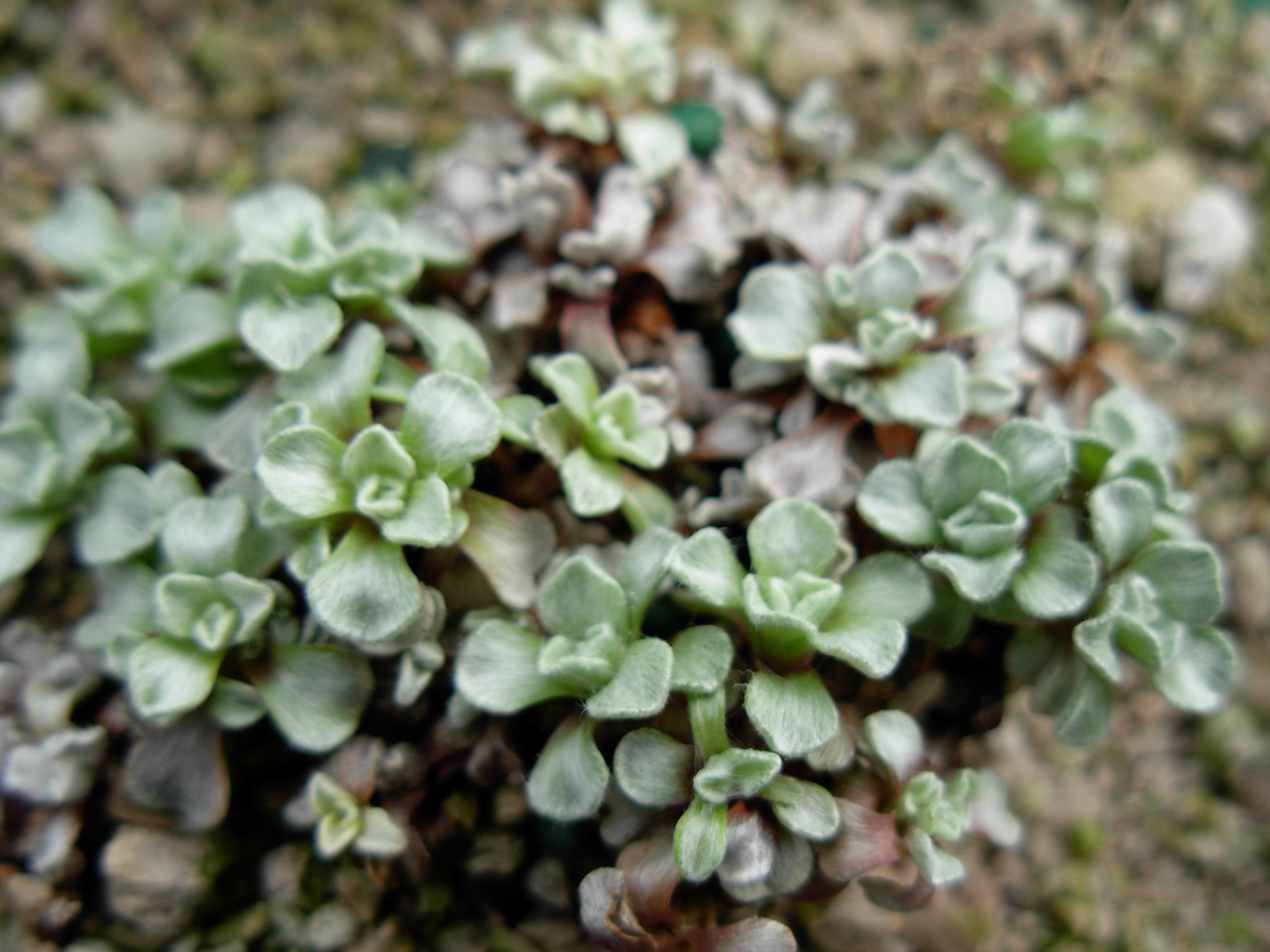
Closeup of leaves

== Distribution and habitat ==
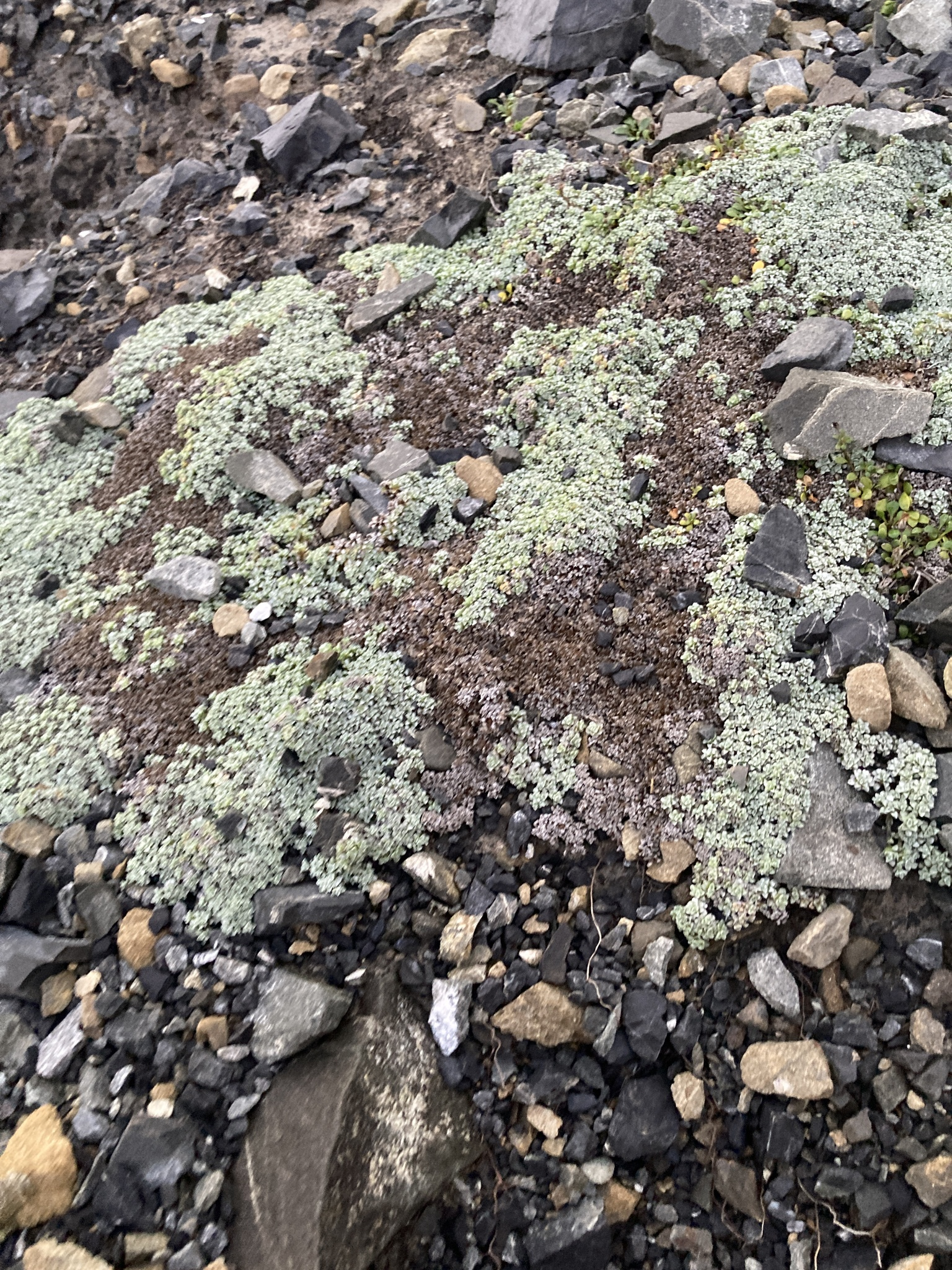
A photo of Raoulia hookeri in habitat

Raoulia hookeri grows on both the North Island and the South Island of New Zealand. It can be found in montane to subalpine areas, particularly places of open ground such as grasslands and herbfields.

== Etymology ==
Raoulia was named after Étienne Raoul (1815–1852), a French naval surgeon and naturalist. The specific epithet hookeri was named after Sir Joseph Dalton Hooker (1817–1911), who travelled under James Clark Ross in the Ross expedition and wrote a book on New Zealand flora.

== Taxonomy ==
Raoulia hookeri contains the following varieties:

- Raoulia hookeri var. albosericea
- Raoulia hookeri var. hookeri
- Raoulia hookeri var. laxa
- Raoulia hookeri var. Makara
