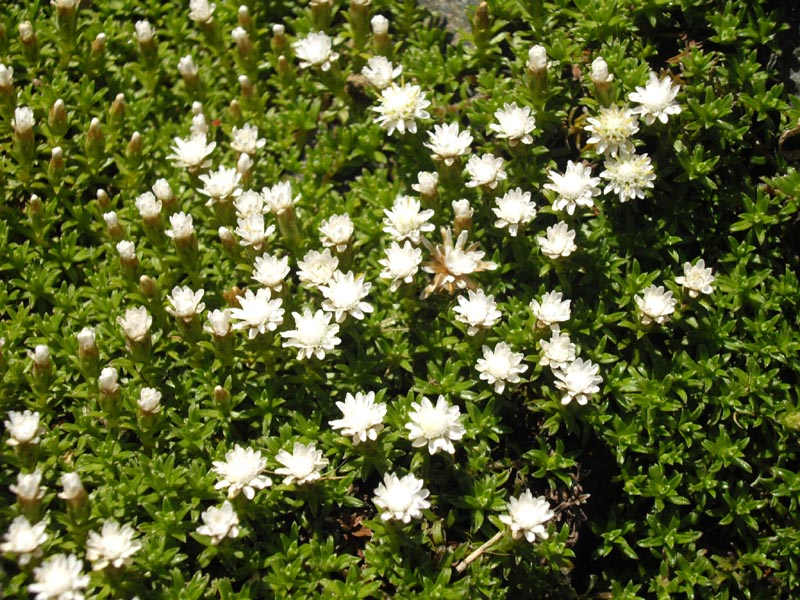
- Raoulia glabra in bloom

Conservation status
- Not Threatened (NZ TCS)

Scientific classification
- Kingdom: Plantae
- Clade: Embryophytes
- Clade: Tracheophytes
- Clade: Angiosperms
- Clade: Eudicots
- Clade: Asterids
- Order: Asterales
- Family: Asteraceae
- Genus: Raoulia
- Species: R. glabra

Binomial name
- Raoulia glabra Hook.f.

= Raoulia glabra =

Species of flowering plant

Raoulia glabra, or the mat daisy, is a species of flowering plant that is endemic to New Zealand.

== Description ==
This species grows vegetative mats of dense leaves, spreading along the ground. It is a creeping shrub, and does not ascend vertically. The leaves are small and green. The flowers are white or yellow. Both the leaves and the achenes are glabrous.

== Distribution and habitat ==
Raoulia glabra is found across New Zealand, on both the North and South Island. It is not threatened and has a wide distribution. It grows in temperate zones.

== Ecology ==
Flowering for Raoulia glabra occurs in some places as late as March, after most other Raoulia species have finished flowering. The flowers have been known to be visited by Lycaena boldenarum and Tachinid flies.

== Etymology ==
Glabra is likely meant to indicate the leaves and achenes; glabra means 'hairless' in Latin.

== Taxonomy ==
Raoulia glabra is most closely related to Raoulia subsericea and Raoulia hookeri.
