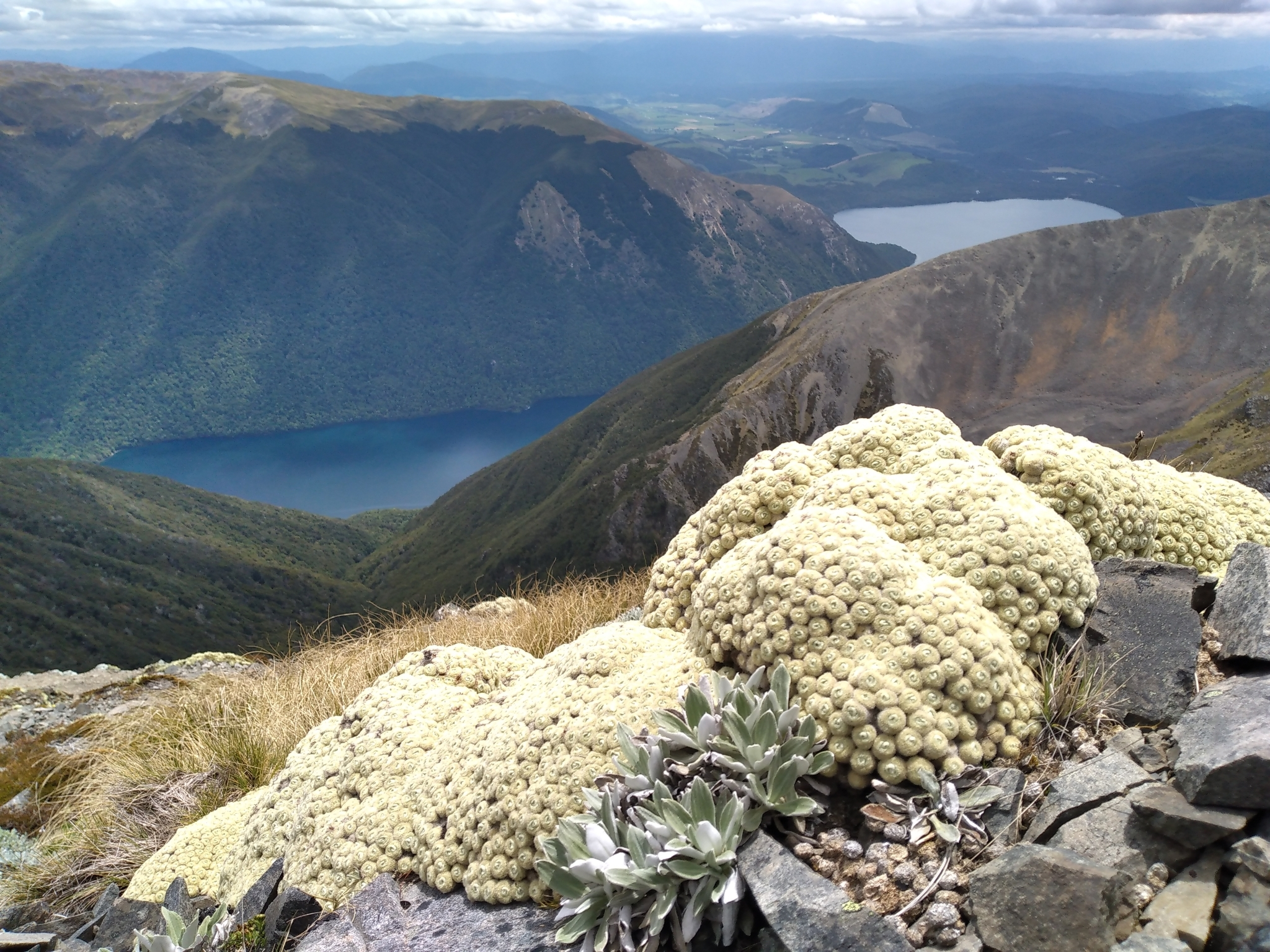
- Haastia pulvinaris in Nelson Lakes National Park

Conservation status
- Not Threatened (NZ TCS)

Scientific classification
- Kingdom: Plantae
- Clade: Embryophytes
- Clade: Tracheophytes
- Clade: Angiosperms
- Clade: Eudicots
- Clade: Asterids
- Order: Asterales
- Family: Asteraceae
- Genus: Haastia
- Species: H. pulvinaris

Binomial name
- Haastia pulvinaris Laing

= Haastia pulvinaris =

Species of flowering plant

Haastia pulvinaris, or vegetable sheep, is a species of perennial alpine plant that grows in a bizarre, sheep-like formation on scree slopes in the South Island of New Zealand.

It is not actually a sheep; but from far away, the vegetable sheep can look like a flock of them on the rocky slopes where they live.

== Description ==
Haastia pulvinaris is a stout, white perennial that grows in thick mats. These mats give the appearance of felting together, with each section having a 1" or so wide circular felted leaf, and sometimes with a black dot or an orange flower in the middle. The mats can grow up to a few metres in length, and they give the appearance of a flock of sheep from far away.

== Range ==
Known only from the South Island. A species of Raoulia forms vegetable sheep on the North Island.

== Habitat ==
Scree slopes and alpine rock fields.

== Ecology ==
The dense wool-like branchlets enable this plant to form tough mats on otherwise inhospitable scree fields. It is often found in isolation, although Epilobium and other grasses and flowers can sometimes grow near them.

== Taxonomy ==
Haastia pulvinaris contains the following varieties:

- Haastia pulvinaris var. pulvinaris
- Haastia pulvinaris var. minor

These varieties were only recently split out into two species.
