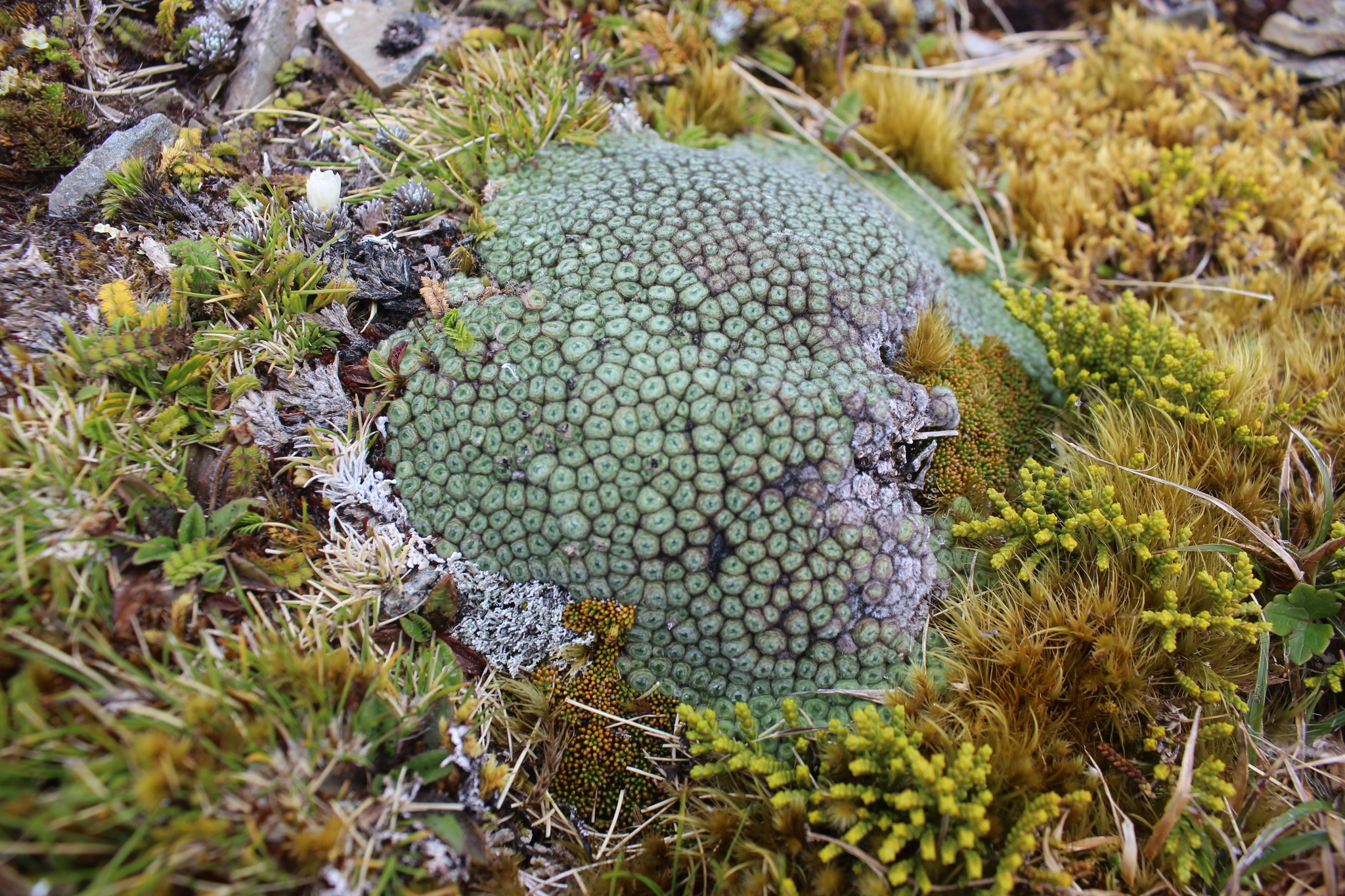
- Raoulia rubra in the Tararua Range

Conservation status
- Not Threatened (NZ TCS)

Scientific classification
- Kingdom: Plantae
- Clade: Tracheophytes
- Clade: Angiosperms
- Clade: Eudicots
- Clade: Asterids
- Order: Asterales
- Family: Asteraceae
- Genus: Raoulia
- Species: R. rubra

Binomial name
- Raoulia rubra Buchanan

= Raoulia rubra =

Species of plant

Raoulia rubra is a cushion plant belonging to the family Asteraceae and is found in the mountains of the southern North Island and the northern South Island of New Zealand. Its common name in English is scabweed, although it is also sometimes called vegetable sheep.

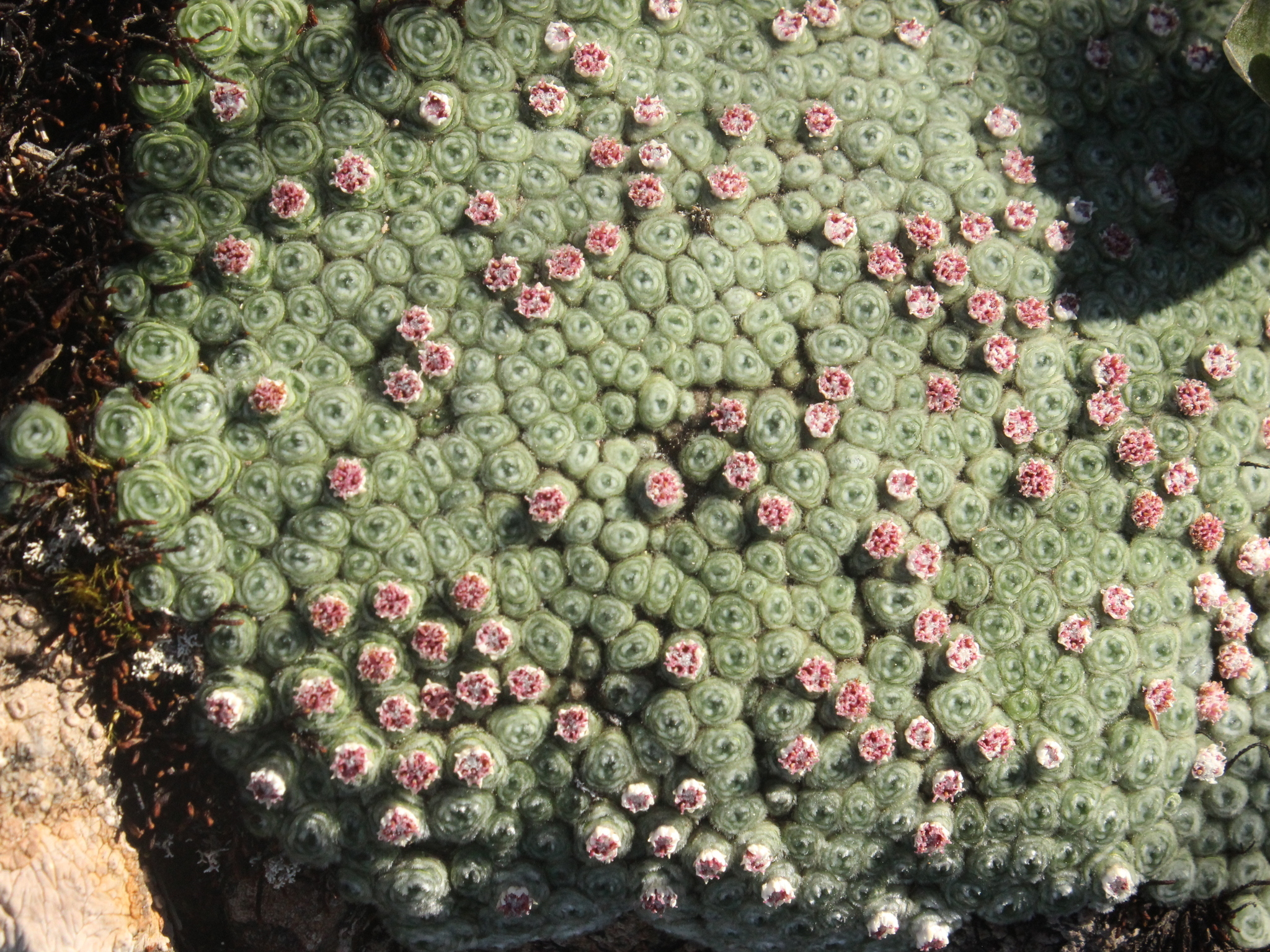
Raoulia rubra in flower

== Description ==
Although the whitish cushion can be 60 cm (24 in) wide it is only 25 mm thick, and looks superficially like a lichen. The scattered tiny flowers are red.
