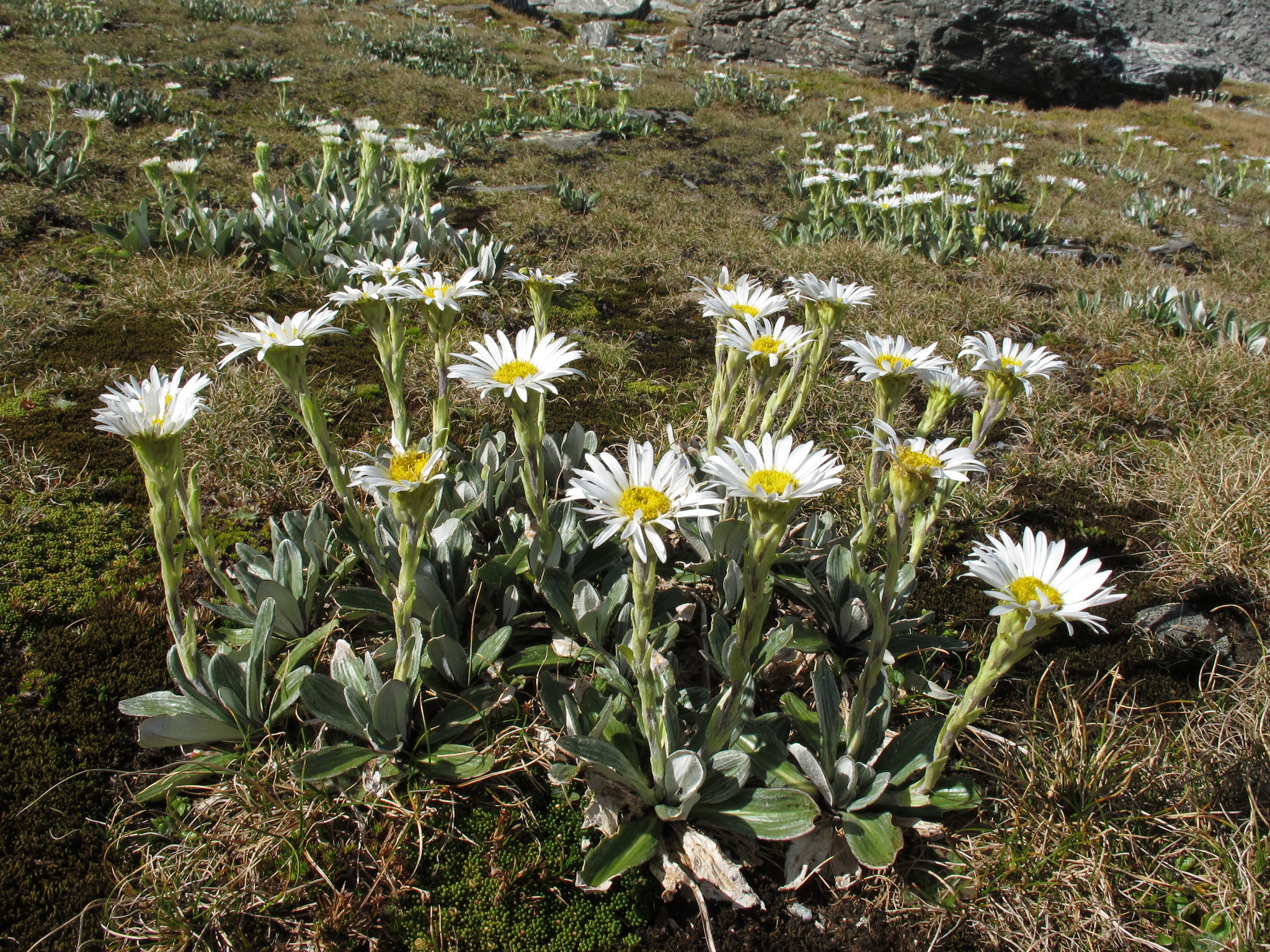
- Haast's mountain daisies

Scientific classification
- Kingdom: Plantae
- Clade: Embryophytes
- Clade: Tracheophytes
- Clade: Spermatophytes
- Clade: Angiosperms
- Clade: Eudicots
- Clade: Asterids
- Order: Asterales
- Family: Asteraceae
- Genus: Celmisia
- Species: C. haastii

Binomial name
- Celmisia haastii Hook.f., 1864

= Celmisia haastii =

Species of plant endemic to New Zealand

Celmisia haastii (Haast's mountain daisy) is a perennial alpine plant species of the family Asteraceae, native to New Zealand.

The larvae of the leaf miner moth Stigmella childi feed on the leaves of this plant.

Two varieties are recognised within the species. C. haastii var. haastii is found in the southern South Island, whereas C. haastii var. tomentosa is endemic to the Rock and Pillar Range.
