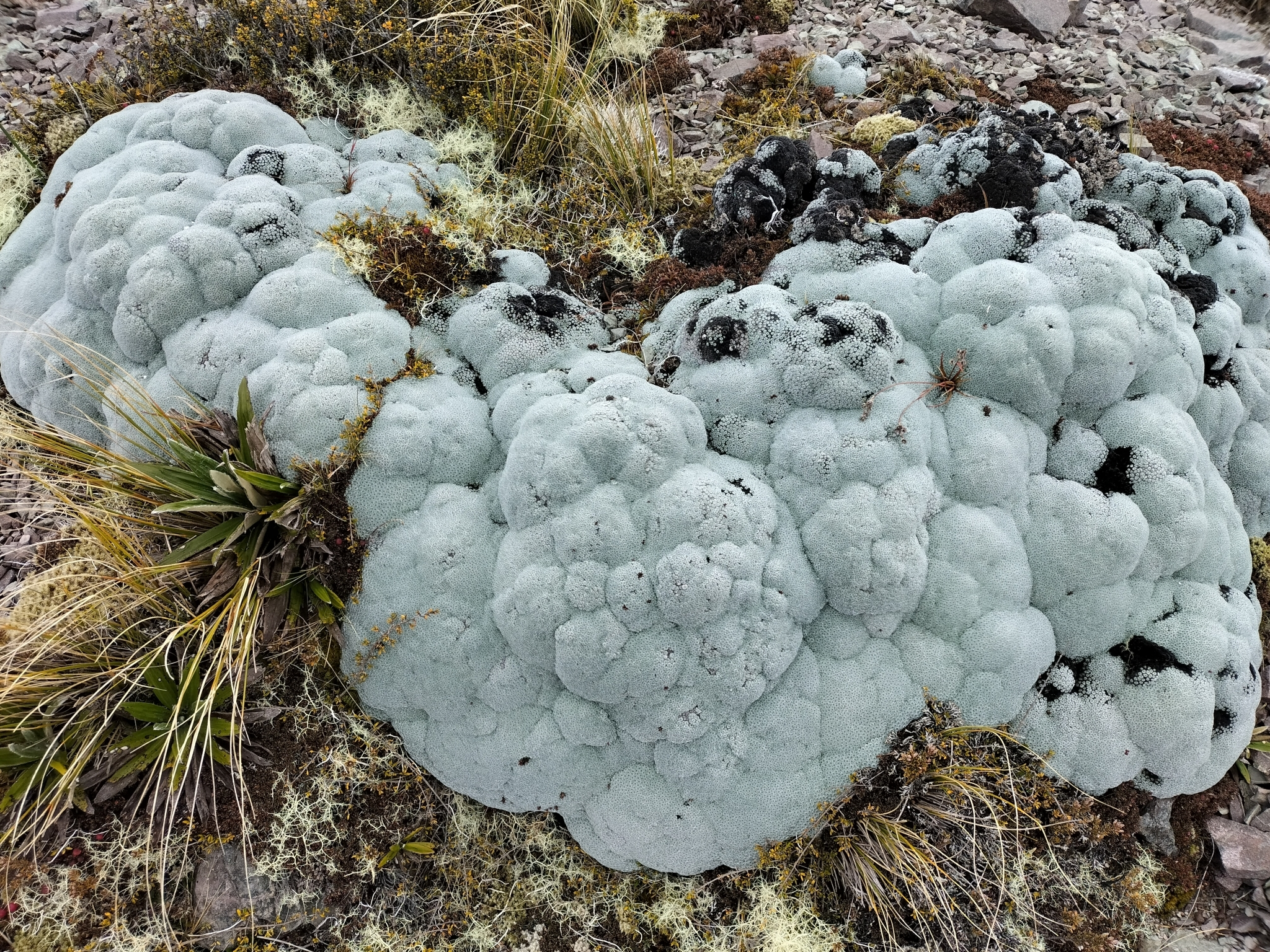

Scientific classification
- Kingdom: Plantae
- Clade: Tracheophytes
- Clade: Angiosperms
- Clade: Eudicots
- Clade: Asterids
- Order: Asterales
- Family: Asteraceae
- Genus: Raoulia
- Species: R. eximia

Binomial name
- Raoulia eximia Hook.f.

Synonyms
- Psychrophyton eximium Hook.f. Beauverd, 1910; Haastia greenii Hook.f. Kirk, 1899

= Raoulia eximia =

Species of flowering plant

Raoulia eximia is a species of plant in the family Asteraceae. It was first formally described in 1864 by Joseph Dalton Hooker. It is endemic to New Zealand. The plant is commonly known by its Māori name tutāhuna and as the true vegetable sheep, suggesting its appearance at a distance resembling a sheep.

== Description ==
On the vegetable sheep only the buds, that never unfold, can be seen externally because their stems are so branched, and have small woolly leaves that are disposed on the extremity of the twigs in a closely tight way. The dense, hard and convex shape of Raoulia eximia formed by its compressed structures, according to Cockayne it makes "an excellent and appropriate seat for a wearied botanist".

The species of Raoulia can be easily mystified because of the overall resemblance in general appearance, despite being taxonomically distinct. Raoulia eximia, the Canterbury vegetable sheep, usually found on rock outcrops has grey to grey-green colouration and narrow buds.

Hook.f. describe the species as a rigid plant that form large woolly balls on the mountains covered in soft, velvety, white tomentum. "Leaves most densely compacted, wholly hidden amongst woolly hairs, imbricated all round in many series, 1/8 in. long, membranous, broadly linear- or obovate-oblong, rounded at the tip, bearing at the back above the middle a dense thick pencil of white velvety hairs, these bundles of hairs, meeting beyond the leaves, envelope the whole". The plant has circular cushions up to 1 m. or more diam., up to 5 dm. or more tall formed by the woody branches very close-packed and a strong stock. "Florets 10–15 or more. Achenes hardly 1 mm. long, clad in long silky hairs; pappus-hairs rigid"

== Distribution ==
About 93 percent of the alpine plants are just found at New Zealand Biological Region. New Zealand has only a few alpine genera among all the genera of alpines and they are usually the less notable members, except for Raoulia.

The light-coloured cushions of the true vegetable sheep can be found on the drier fellfields located on the east of the Southern Alps, between north Otago and southern Nelson Marlborough, from mid-Canterbury to north Otago and in the S. Subalpine to alpine rocky ground and fellfield from lat. 41 to 45 30'.

== Habitat preference ==
The formation of soils on the mountains is high because of the wind-blown material, but the constant strong winds, cold summers and frequent freeze-thaw cycles draw off all the soil formed. The plants in the alpine zone, like R. eximia, are exposed to high moisture in the soil, except when the ground is frozen. However, excess water, which increases with rainfall, makes the soil more acidic and also provokes the leaching of nutrients. R. eximia can be found in raw soils, with low nutrient concentrations, typically mean total phosphorus (P) 69.5 mg·kg-1, and total nitrogen (N) 0.04%.
