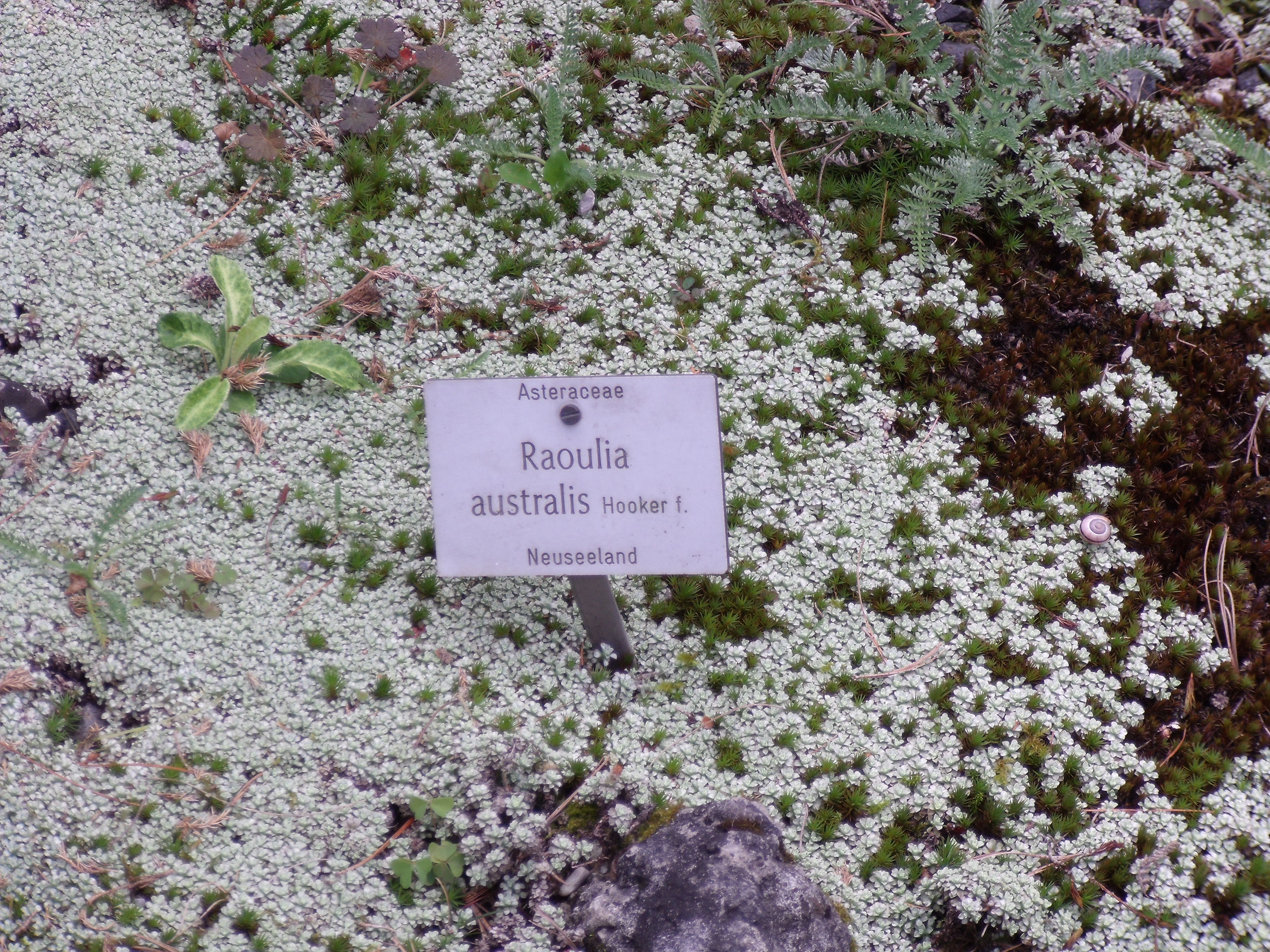
- Habit
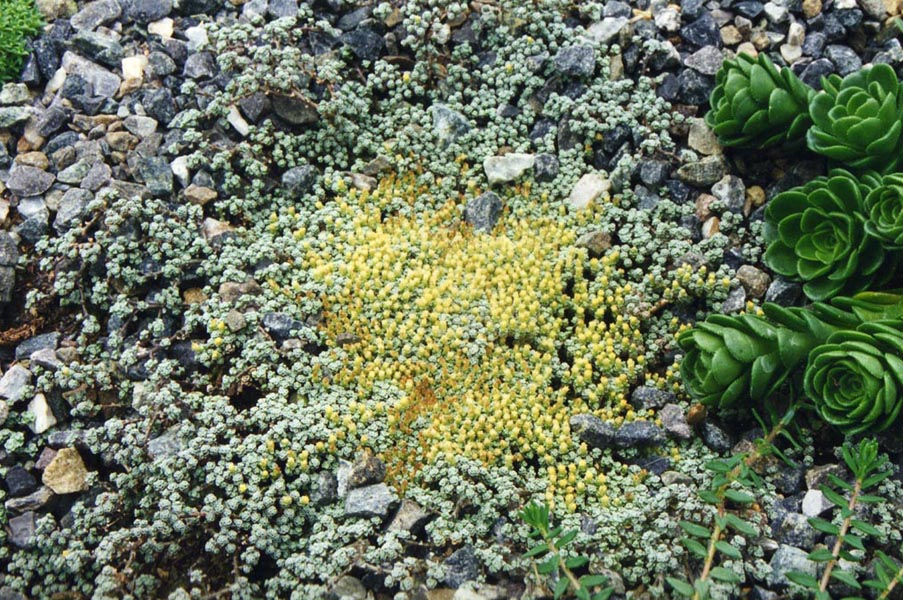
- 'Calf' cultivar in bloom

Scientific classification
- Kingdom: Plantae
- Clade: Tracheophytes
- Clade: Angiosperms
- Clade: Eudicots
- Clade: Asterids
- Order: Asterales
- Family: Asteraceae
- Genus: Raoulia
- Species: R. australis

Binomial name
- Raoulia australis Hook.f. ex Raoul

Synonyms
- Raoulia lutescens Beauverd

= Raoulia australis =

Species of plant in the daisy family

Raoulia australis, the scabweed or scab plant, is a species of flowering plant in the family Asteraceae, native to New Zealand. It is used as a ground cover.
