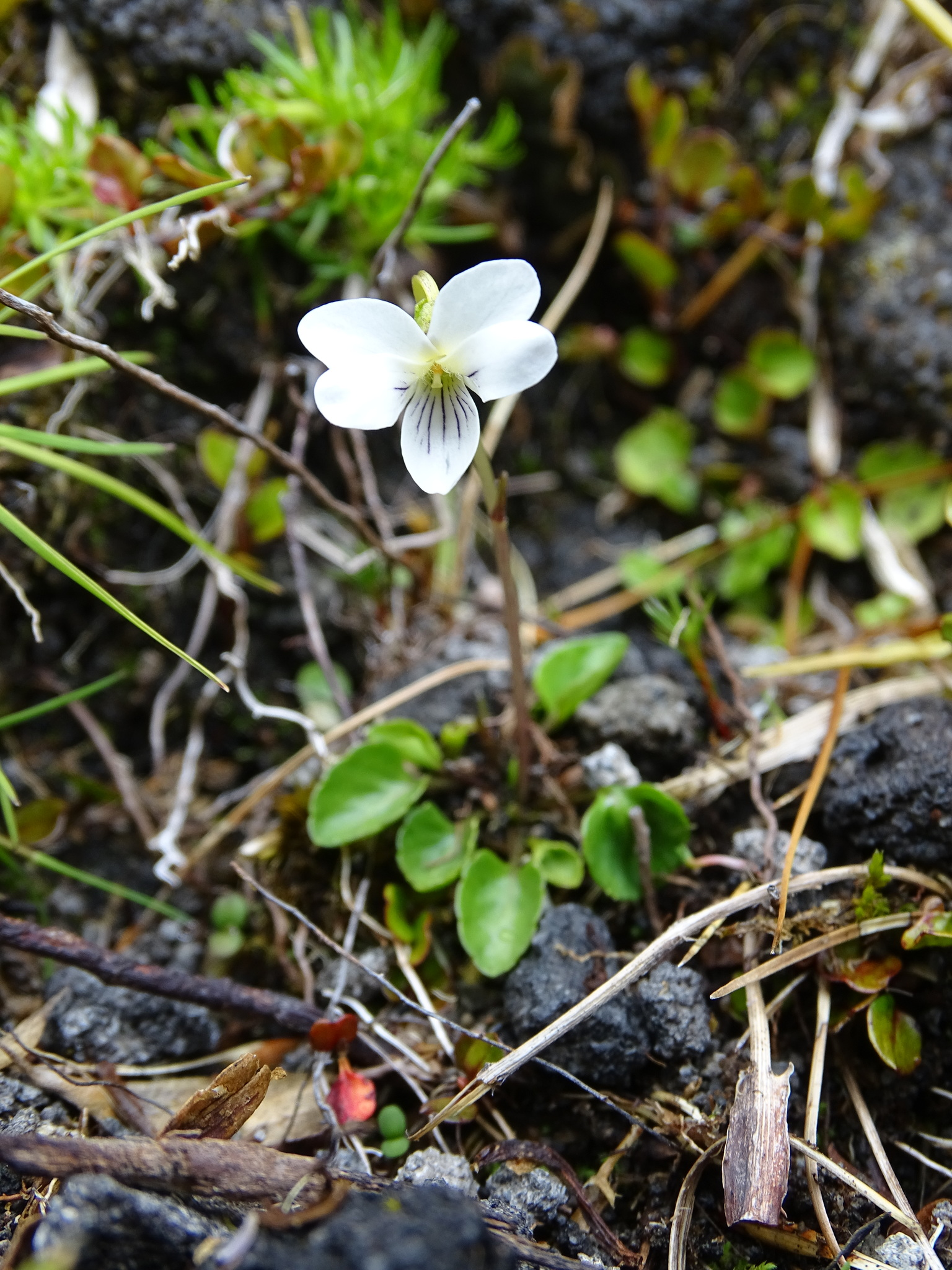

Scientific classification
- Kingdom: Plantae
- Clade: Tracheophytes
- Clade: Angiosperms
- Clade: Eudicots
- Clade: Rosids
- Order: Malpighiales
- Family: Violaceae
- Genus: Viola
- Species: V. cunninghamii

Binomial name
- Viola cunninghamii Hook.f.

Synonyms
- List: Viola cunninghamii var. radicata Hook.f.; Viola perexigua Colenso

= Viola cunninghamii =

Species of Viola

Viola cunninghamii, also known as the white mountain viola, is a species of flowering plant within the genus Viola and family Violaceae. It is endemic to New Zealand.

== Description ==
Viola cunninghamii is a perennial herb known for its slender and branching rhizome. The plant forms a cluster of leaves in a tufted rosette pattern. The leaf blades are generally triangular-ovate to sub-orbicular, measuring between 10 and 20 mm in diameter. The edges of the leaves have slightly indistinct, crenate margins, and their stalks are longer than the blade itself.

The flowers of Viola cunninghamii emerge singularly on elongated stalks that surpass the length of the leaves. These delicate flowers showcase shades of white or pale violet, with a length of about 6 to 10 mm. Notably, the rear petal of the flower features a short, blunt spur. The flowering period typically occurs between the months of November and February. The fruit of this herb takes the form of a capsule that splits open into three valves when matured. The species has a chromosome count of 2n = 48.

When distinguishing Viola cunninghamii from other Viola species in Tasmania, certain defining characteristics of this species can be identified. The presence of rhizomes distinguishes it as a rhizomatous species. Additionally, the spurred anterior petal, rather than just a pouched one, sets it apart. Furthermore, the leaves of Viola cunninghamii are rounded, contrasting with the lanceolate or oblong leaves found in other similar species.

== Distribution and habitat ==
Viola cunninghamii possesses a widespread Oceanic distribution, where it can be found in New Zealand, Tasmania and the Chatham Islands. The species inhabits elevated mountain habitats such as alpine herbfields, grasslands, and grassy heaths.
