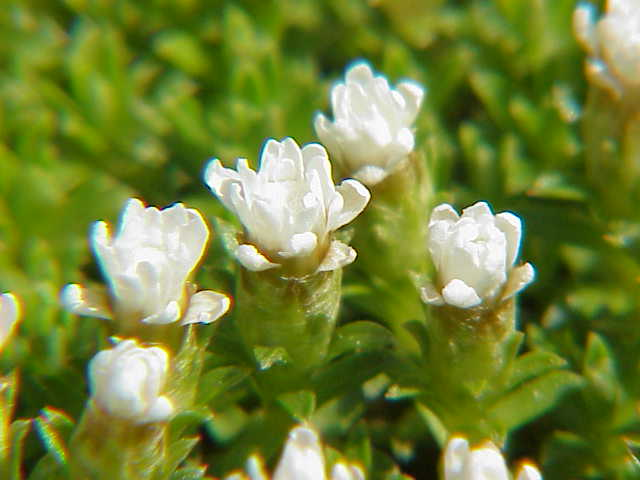
- Raoulia glabra

Scientific classification
- Kingdom: Plantae
- Clade: Embryophytes
- Clade: Tracheophytes
- Clade: Angiosperms
- Clade: Eudicots
- Clade: Asterids
- Order: Asterales
- Family: Asteraceae
- Subfamily: Asteroideae
- Tribe: Gnaphalieae
- Genus: Raoulia; Hook.f. ex Raoul

Type species
- Raoulia australis Hook.f. ex Raoul

Synonyms
- Psychrophyton Beauverd; Gnaphalium section Psychrophyton (Hook.f. ex Raoul) Baillon

= Raoulia =

Genus of plants

Raoulia is a genus of New Zealand plants in the tribe Gnaphalieae within the family Asteraceae.

Many Raoulia species grow in alpine areas, forming very fine and dense growths. These compact growths form large amorphous cushion-like masses with only the growing tips visible. Due to their shape and form, the plant clusters resemble sheep from afar, this giving them their alternate name, vegetable sheep.

Haastia pulvinaris is another species of plant in the aster family that is also known as vegetable sheep, and which grows in similar environments.

The range of some species, such as Raoulia beauverdii, includes coastal places.

== Taxonomy ==
Species

- Raoulia albosericea
- Raoulia apicinigra
- Raoulia australis
- Raoulia beauverdii
- Raoulia bryoides
- Raoulia buchananii
- Raoulia catipes
- Raoulia chiliastra
- Raoulia cinerea
- Raoulia eximia
- Raoulia glabra
- Raoulia goyenii
- Raoulia grandiflora
- Raoulia haastii
- Raoulia hectorii
- Raoulia hookeri
- Raoulia mammillaris
- Raoulia monroi
- Raoulia parkii
- Raoulia petriensis
- Raoulia planchonii
- Raoulia rubra
- Raoulia subsericea
- Raoulia subulata
- Raoulia tenuicaulis
- Raoulia youngii

Formerly included

- Argyrotegium mackayi (Raoulia mackayi)

== Cultivation ==
Slow spreading, flat rock garden plant with silver-gray, almost moss-like, foliage.

- sun: full sun, part shade
- height: 50 mm (2 in)
- width: spreads to around 300 mm (1 ft).
- water: regular
- hardiness: −7 °C (20 °F) according to one source, 2 °C (35 °F) according to another
- heat tolerance: unknown

== See also ==
- Vegetable Lamb of Tartary (mythological plant)
