= Truby King Baby Health Centre =

Heritage-listed child health care centre in Melbourne, Victoria, Australia

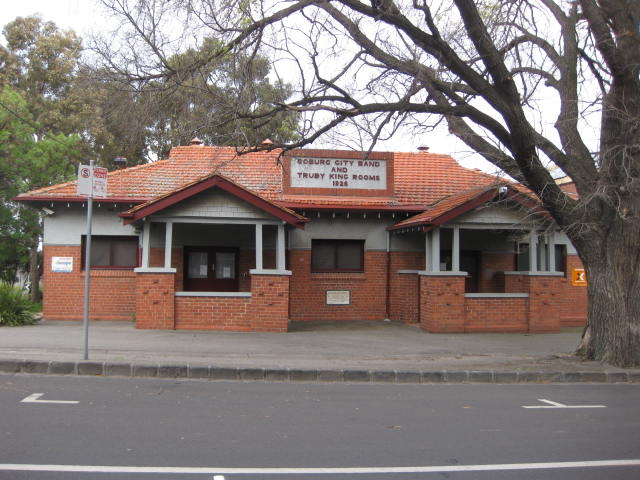
- The centre and band rooms in 2019

- Location within Melbourne
- Interactive map of the Truby King Baby Health Centre area
- Etymology: Dr Sir (Frederic) Truby King CMG

General information
- Status: Completed
- Type: Child health care centre
- Architectural style: California bungalow
- Location: Coburg, Melbourne, Victoria, Australia
- Coordinates: 37°44′26″S 144°58′08″E
- Year built: 1925–1926
- Opened: 24 July 1926; 100 years ago

Technical details
- Material: Red bricks; terracotta tiles

Design and construction
- Architect: R. McC. Dawson

Victorian Heritage Register
- Official name: Baby Health Care Centre
- Type: Registered place
- Designated: 11 September 2003
- Reference no.: H2042
- Heritage overlay no.: HO245
- Category: Health Services

The Truby King Baby Health Centre is a child health care centre, located on City of Merri-bek Council property on Elm Grove, in Coburg, an inner northern suburb of Melbourne, in Victoria, Australia. The facilities in the centre are shared with the local brass band.

The building was added to the Victorian Heritage Register on 11 September 2003 in recognition of its historical and social significance.

== History ==
The idea that society should provide infant dietary help to new mothers to reduce infant mortality and in turn improve adult health was first promoted by the physician Dr Sir (Frederic) Truby King CMG (1858–1938) in 1905. Trained in medicine at Edinburgh, he became Medical Superintendent at the Seacliff Lunatic Asylum in New Zealand, where he greatly improved the health of his ailing adopted baby daughter.

He trained local nurses in his infant dietary methods and in 1907 founded the Society for the Promotion of the Health of Women and Children. This was later renamed as the Plunket Society, in honour of its patron, Lady Victoria Plunket, wife of the then Governor of New Zealand, William Plunket, 5th Baron Plunket, and a mother of eight. King's "Twelve Essentials", which were radical at the time, for the raising of healthy infants included: "air and sunshine, water, food, clothing, bathing, muscular exercise and sensory stimulation, warmth, regularity, cleanliness, mothering, management, and rest and sleep".

In Australia, King's methods were largely ignored by the Victorian Baby Health Care Association who chose to promote other expert opinions. In c. 1913, Sister M. V. Primrose of South Yarra inaugurated the movement in conjunction with the Victorian Trained Nurses' Association (est. 1901). On 4 December 1919, King opened the first Truby King Centre in Victoria, located in Coburg. A growing population and an increasing awareness of the service offered by the centre led to overcrowding and the need for new quarters.

In 1925, architect R. McC. Dawson designed a new building and King laid the foundation stone in October 1925. The new purpose-built centre, located adjacent to the Coburg City Hall complex, was opened by the mayor on 24 July 1926. The building facilities were, and continue to be, shared with the Coburg City Band.

== Description ==
The centre has the domestic appearance and scale of a Californian bungalow house. Constructed of red brick with a terracotta tile roof, it has two projecting entrance porches, each gabled, supported by grouped timber posts and solid brick piers. A rendered parapet between the porches has raised lettering indicating "Coburg City Band and Truby King Rooms 1926".

The building is socially important for its enduring civic value to the community. The premises have been in continual use since the building's opening, successfully accommodating facilities for both baby health and the city's brass band meetings. As a baby health centre, the building is socially and culturally important for marking phases in the lives of mothers and infants. Designed to resemble a typical middleclass suburban house, the purpose-built centre was a symbol of domesticity. It was also symbolic of a culturally progressive caring society, a place associated with new scientific ideas, and professionally designed programs designed to improve the health education of women raising families in the developing suburbs.

== See also ==
- Architecture of Melbourne
- Karitane hospitals
- List of places on the Victorian Heritage Register in the City of Merri-bek
