= Evelyn Wrench =

British author and journalist

Sir Evelyn Wrench
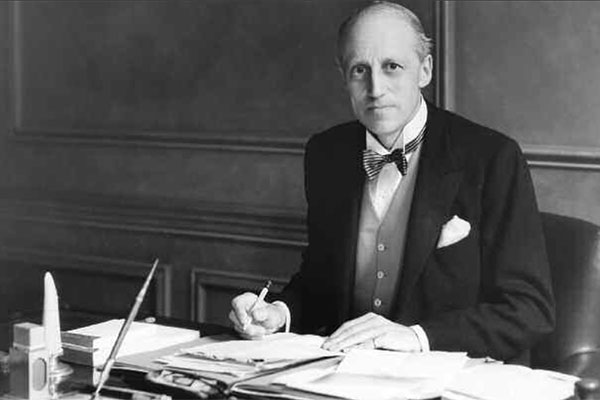
- Evelyn Wrench at English-Speaking Union
- Born: John Evelyn Leslie Wrench; 29 October 1882; Brookeborough, County Fermanagh, Ireland
- Died: 11 November 1966 (aged 84); High Wycombe, Buckinghamshire, England
- Occupation: Author
- Spouse: Hylda Henrietta Brooke

Sir John Evelyn Leslie Wrench KCMG (29 October 1882 – 11 November 1966) was a British author and journalist who was editor of The Spectator. He was the founder of the Royal Over-Seas League (ROSL) and the English-Speaking Union (ESU), both established to foster international communication and education. His initial gamble in the postcard business, due to the popularity of postcards, proved a temporary success. By the turn of the century, half of all the postcards sold in Paris came from his stores. He later became a prominent author on matters relating to the British Empire.

== Early life ==
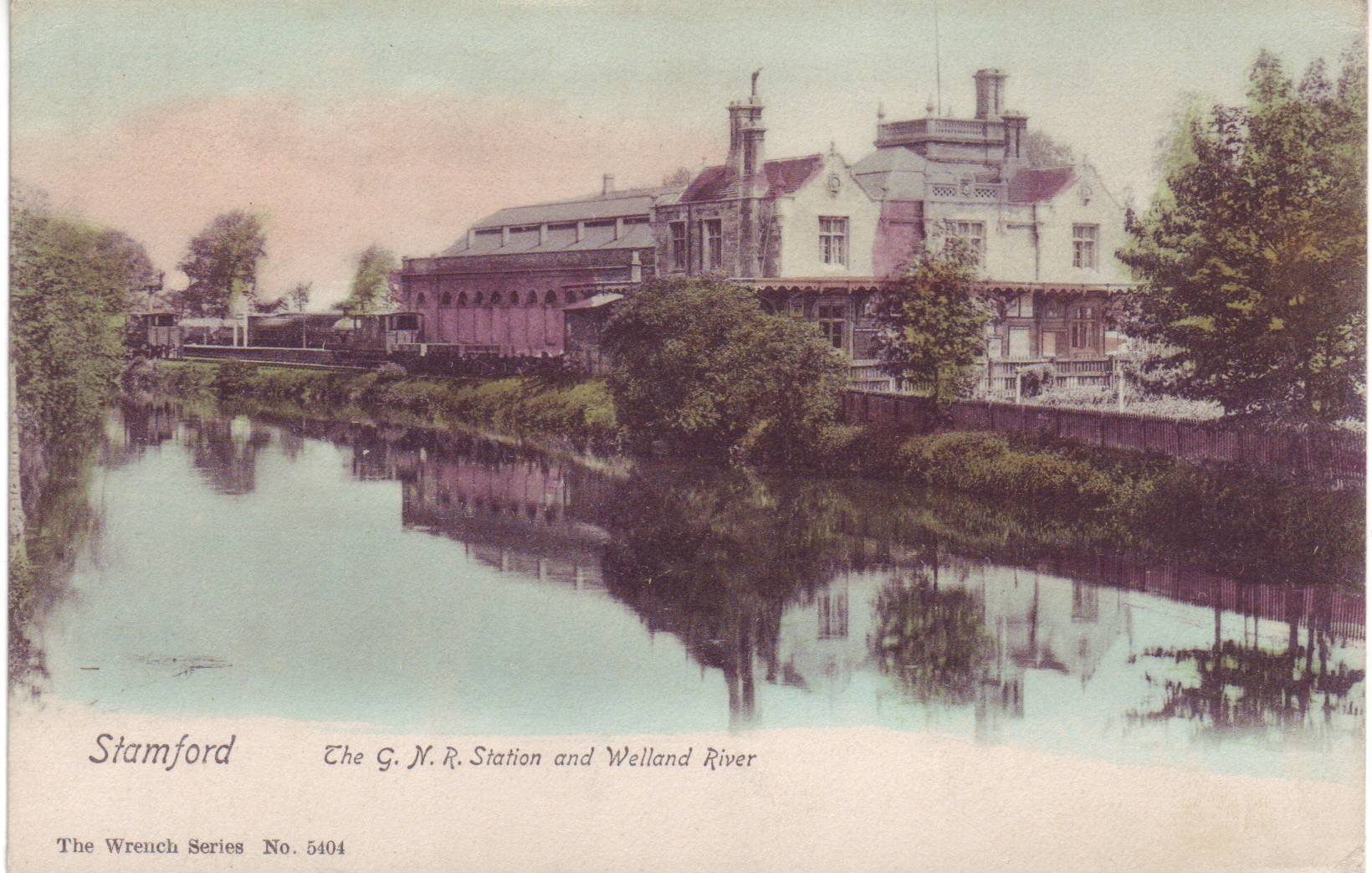
Stamford East railway station, a Wrench Series postcard

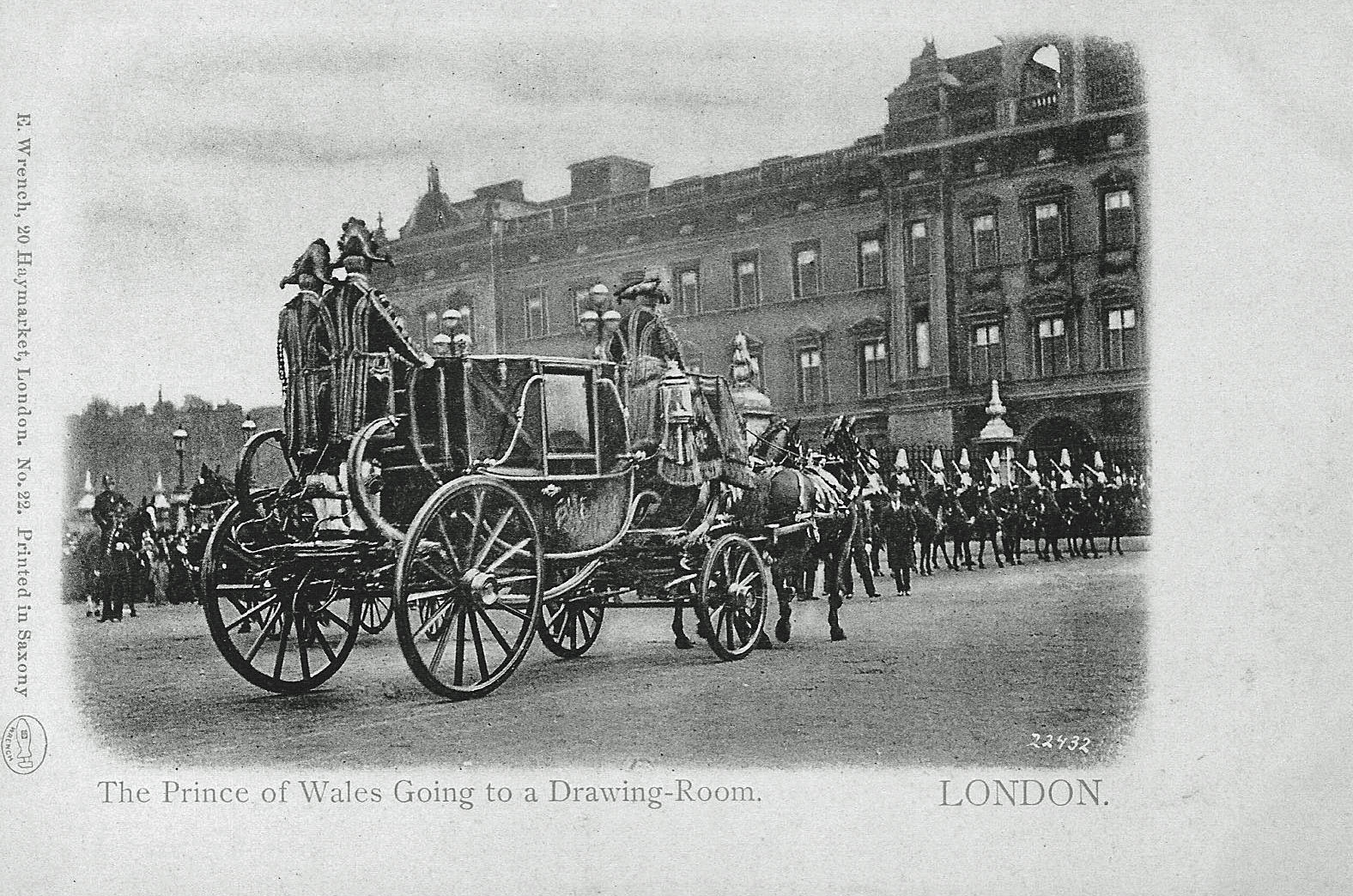
Buckingham Palace, an E. Wrench postcard

Wrench was born in 1882, in Brookeborough, County Fermanagh, part of the Province of Ulster in Ireland. Ireland was at the time part of the United Kingdom of Great Britain and Ireland. He was the son of the Rt. Hon. Frederick Stringer Wrench (1849–1926), an Irish Land Commissioner, Deputy Lieutenant and Privy Councillor, by his wife Charlotte Mary Bellingham (1848–1935), sister of Sir Henry Bellingham, 4th Baronet.

At the age of five years, his favourite literature was Army and Navy Stores catalogues, which his parents gave him to keep him quiet during railway journeys. He attended Summer Fields Preparatory School (1896), and Eton College (1896–1899).

=== Postcard company ===
Upon leaving Eton, Wrench travelled on the Continent to learn languages with the idea of entering the Diplomatic Service. He noticed the lead that the Continent had over Great Britain in the production of picture postcards, and upon his return instituted a firm that expanded rapidly, selling three million cards a month at its height This occupied him from 1900 until 1904, when the firm failed, mainly through too rapid an expansion and lack of capital. This venture indicated the enterprising spirit that Wrench possessed, and its failure in no way lowered his reputation.

=== Journalism and autobiography ===
The future Lord Northcliffe had observed Wrench's qualities and invited him to join his staff, which he did in 1904. He was editor of The Overseas Daily Mail and in addition manager of the export department of the Amalgamated Press from 1907 and sales manager from 1909. Wrench, however, was less interested in success in journalism than in his visions of Commonwealth development awakened by his visits to Canada and the United States. He told in his book Uphill, the first volume of his autobiography, how in 1910 a turning point came in his life, crystallizing itself in his memory as a "vision" that came to him at the memorial service to King Edward VII in Westminster Abbey, where he said, "the scales fell from my eyes, I vowed I would devote my life to great causes – to the Empire, to my fellows."

=== Overseas League ===
Passionately longing to make a more personal contribution to the unity of the British Empire, he formed in 1910 The Royal Over-Seas League as The Overseas Club in order to encourage international understanding. The Royal Over-Seas League is a self-funded Commonwealth organization that offers clubhouse, conference, and private-dining facilities in London and Edinburgh; organizes Commonwealth art and music competitions; and develops joint welfare projects with specific countries. In 1918, the League was amalgamated with the Patriotic League of Britons Overseas, with which group it had been working in conjunction on several projects. In 1922, the League was granted a Royal Charter of Incorporation. The clubhouses have not-for-profit status and the art music and welfare projects charitable status. The governing body is the Central Council. There are reciprocal clubs, branches, or chapters in over seventy countries. The aim of the League is "To support the ideals of the Commonwealth; to encourage young Commonwealth artists and musicians; and encourage Commonwealth friendship and support welfare work." The League is pledged under its Royal Charter "to give service to the Commonwealth." He put his full enthusiasm and energies into this organization, resigned his newspaper appointments in 1912, and embarked upon a visit to the dominions in 1912–1913. An example of his work in the Royal Over-Seas League was his invitation in 1917, with Lady Victoria Plunket, to Dr Truby King to travel from New Zealand to London to help found the Babies of the Empire Society, later to become the Mothercraft Training Society.

He ended up travelling 64,000 miles to all parts of the British Empire. In 1911, while in New Zealand, he gave Captain Robert Falcon Scott, R.N., the British Antarctic explorer, a clean handkerchief immediately before the latter's departure for the South Pole. His club made rapid progress and during the war of 1914–1918 its contribution included the Empire Fund to provide tobacco for the forces. It worked in conjunction with the Patriotic League of Britons Overseas, with which it amalgamated in 1918. In 1923, the society was granted a royal charter and became the Overseas League.

=== Royal Flying Corps ===
In 1917, Wrench joined the Royal Flying Corps. He reached the rank of major and served as principal private secretary to Lord Rothermere when he was President of the Air Council, and later as his deputy when controller for the dominions and United States at the Ministry of Information.

=== English-Speaking Union ===
As a result of his experience in this last appointment, Wrench founded in 1918 the English-Speaking Union of the Commonwealth "in no narrow attitude of race pride, in no spirit of hostility to any people" and created the mission statement of the English-Speaking Union in the first edition of the organization's magazine, Landmark: "Believing that the peace of the world and the progress of mankind can be largely helped by the unity in purpose of the English-Speaking Democracies, we pledge ourselves to promote by every means in our power a good understanding between the peoples of the USA and the British Commonwealth." The E.S.U. shortly afterwards absorbed the Atlantic Union, and was extremely active during World War II, when, among other projects, it created the Sir Evelyn Wrench Tobacco Fund to provide tobacco money for members of the Allied Forces.

In 1920, he founded a twin organization, the English-Speaking Union of the United States, which organization created the Sir Evelyn Wrench Travelling Fellowships in his honour. The first President of the English-Speaking Union of the United States was former President of the United States William Howard Taft.

From 1918 until 1920, he was a committee member of Royal Commonwealth Society. In January 1932, he was knighted by His Majesty King George V of Great Britain. For many years between the wars, Wrench acted as secretary of the Overseas League and as editor of the League's journal, "Over-Seas," in which his "Monthly Letter" was enjoyed by many as an informal summary of the previous month's events. He also served two terms as chairman of the English-Speaking Union.

=== The Spectator ===
In addition, he was a contributor to, and from 1925 to 1932 editor of, The Spectator magazine in Britain. He had bought a controlling interest in The Spectator from John Strachey in 1925 and, although he later sold his controlling shareholding to Sir Ian Gilmour, he was chairman of the board for the remainder of his life.

=== All People's Association ===
Wrench's third major project, the All Peoples' Association, founded by him in 1930, while promoting friendship among the world's peoples, was largely unsuccessful. The wideness of its scope was too idealistic. Its special field in attempting understanding between the English and German peoples was poorly nurtured in the hostile soil of increasing Nazism. The publication of his nostalgic book I Loved Germany in May 1940 was ill-timed and misunderstood.

== Marriage ==
On 18 May 1937, in St. Paul's Church, London, he married his first cousin, Hylda Henrietta Brooke (1879–1955), whom he had known all his life. She was the daughter of Sir Victor Brooke, Bt., sister of Field Marshal Lord Alanbrooke, and widow of Frederick Henry Arthur des Vouex. In 1940, they set out on a tour of Canada, the United States, New Zealand, and Australia. They became stranded in India in 1941 on their way back to England. They quickly found ways of being useful in helping American servicemen. Wrench served from 1942 to 1944 as American relations officer to the Government of India, a post especially created for him by the Viceroy of India.

=== Publications ===
- Uphill: The First Stage in a Strenuous Life (London: I. Nicholson & Watson, Ltd., 1934)
- Struggle 1914–1920 (London: I. Nicholson & Watson, Ltd., 1935)
- I Loved Germany (London: Michael Joseph and Ryerson, 1940)
- Immortal Years (1937–1944) As Viewed from Five Continents (London: Hutchinson & Co. Ltd., 1945)
- Foreword to Young Adventurers by Kitty Byrne, (London/Singapore Branch: Thomas Nelson & Sons, 1947)
- 'Founders of Virginia' (National Geographic, April 1948, pp. 433–462)
- Francis Yeats-Brown, 1886–1944: A Portrait, (London: Eyre & Spottiswoode, 1948)
- 'The British Way' (National Geographic, April 1949, pp. 421–542)
- Transatlantic London: Three Centuries of Association Between England and America (London: Hutchinson & Co., Ltd., 1949)
- 'Founders of New England' (National Geographic, June 1953, pp. 803–838)
- An essay about Winston Churchill in Churchill by his Contemporaries (London: Hutchinson & Co., Ltd., 1953
- Geoffrey Dawson and Our Times (London: Hutchinson & Co., Ltd., 1955)
- Alfred Lord Milner: The Man of No Illusions (London: Eyre & Spottiswoode, 1958)
- A Short History of Great Marlow Parish Church (Gloucester, (UK): British Publishing, 1968).

=== Miscellaneous activities in later life ===
In 1952, Wrench became a joint founder of the "Elizabethan Garden" on Roanoke Island, Dare County, North Carolina, U.S.A. He acted as chairman or protagonist in “World and Ourselves” series of discussions and talked in the "Art of Cookery" series, applauding English cooking of meat, deploring the English cooking of vegetables, and putting forward a plea for communal kitchens. He described broadcasting as the future ‘University of the whole Nation.’

=== Enthusiasms and ideals ===
In 1958, he founded and served as chairman of the Commonwealth Union of Trade "to strengthen the economic bonds" among member countries. Another result of his latter enthusiasms was the foundation in 1958 of the Anglo-Kin Society with the aim of encouraging literary, historical, and topographical research to provide fuller information about places and events in Britain likely to be of interest to the British Commonwealth and the United States. From 1959 to 1960, he made a tour of Commonwealth countries and southeast Asia. From 1961 to 1964, he was President of the Dickens Fellowship; and for many years he was senior trustee of the Cecil Rhodes Memorial Museum Foundation in Bishop's Stortford, England.

Wrench was a deeply religious person and once thought about becoming a missionary. He was an amateur genealogist. Although he was modest and self-effacing, charming in conversation, some found him somewhat aloof and considered he was not a good mixer. This was probably because he had little time for small talk and social gossip. Where he was concerned with some project close to his ideals, he would speak with enthusiasm. Although an idealist, he was at the same time practical. With all of his idealism, he never let go of reality, and was prepared to admit that "perhaps my friends were right when they warned me 'not to be too visionary.'" His lively, likeable personality exuded his literary style, which was pleasantly informal and underlined his sincerity of purpose.

In appearance, Wrench was ascetic looking, slim, with an intelligent, earnest expression. This is brought out well in Sir Oswald Birley's portrait in the Royal Overseas League headquarters in London, England. Another portrait, by Margaret Lindsay Williams, is in the London headquarters of the English-Speaking Union. His hobbies included studying social problems, trying to learn languages, comparing notes with people of other nations, walking, motoring, and sunbathing.

=== Honours ===
For his war services, he was appointed a Commander of the Order of St Michael and St George (CMG) in 1917. He was knighted by George V in 1932. He was advanced to a Knight Commander of the Order of St Michael and St George (KCMG) in 1960, for Commonwealth services.

=== Death and memorial ===
His memorial service was held on 9 December 1966 in the Crypt Chapel, St. Paul's Cathedral, London, with the Archdeacon of London officiating. His burial was presided over by the Abbot of Nashdom, Dom Augustine Morris OSB; the Vicar of Marlow; and the Rev. E. Nobbs. A memorial plaque was placed on the wall of his house by the Anglo-Kin Society. He never had children. W. V. Griffin wrote a book about him, Sir Evelyn Wrench and his continuing vision of international relations during 40 years (New York: 1950).

== Sources ==
- The Times digital archive, 12 November 1966, page 10
- Byatt, Anthony (1978). Picture Postcards and their Publishers. London: Golden Age Postcards. OCLC 641778625.
- The Gazette, official public record
- The Royal Overseas League Magazine
- Archive.org (sign in to access footnotes)

Media offices
Preceded by Charles John Tibbits	Editor of the Weekly Dispatch; 1903–1904	Succeeded by ?
Preceded by John St. Loe Strachey	Editor of The Spectator; 1925–1932	Succeeded by Wilson Harris
