= Ria Tikini =

New Zealand businesswoman and midwife

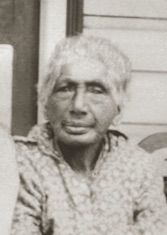
Tikini between 1904 and 1919

Ria Tikini or Ria Te Kini (c. 1810 – 19 July 1919), also known as Mrs Chicken, was a New Zealand businesswoman, cultural informant and midwife. She is credited as one of the midwives who paved the way for the creation of the Plunket Society. As a Kāi Tahu and Kāti Mamoe woman, she was an informant for ethnographer William Anderson Taylor's work on Kāi Tahu history and early European contact with Māori.

== Personal life ==
Tikini was born around 1810 at Ruapuke Island. She was 17 at the time of Te Rauparaha's attacks on Kaiapoi, whether this referred to the initial raid in 1827 or to the later capture in 1831. She was variously said to be 20 or a young woman in the early 1840s during the Wesleyan missions of Reverends Watkin and Creed at Old Waikouaiti.

Little is documented about her family, however Tikini had an elder sister. She married Tikini Paha and adopted (in the traditional whāngai way) a son Henare (Henry) Parata. She lived in a small wooden house below the railway line on the slope of the Puketeraki hill.

Tikini was tattooed in the tuhi style, "each side of her face being adorned with two straight lines and from mouth to ear". By the twentieth century the ethnographer W.A. Taylor considered this an unusual and "ancient" style, which he dated back to the time of Tamatea 600 years previously. Taylor photographed her in 1907 wearing a large korowai, probably a family heirloom, along with a feather in a headscarf as a symbol of high status, and referred to her as a "rangatira wahine" or female chief.

She was known as a "shrewd businesswoman" who sold poultry. It was either this or an attempt to transliterate her name into English that led to her nickname of "Mrs Chicken". She was particularly known for keeping back the wings when she sold whole dressed chickens, which she kept as a "delicious" perk of the job.

When over 80, she was among the public who went to see the Duke and Duchess of Cornwall on their visit to Dunedin. Despite being several times pushed back by an "officious" policeman, she was brought forward by his superior and the royal party shook hands and spoke with her.

By 1913, Tikini's elder sister had died. The sister's land in Kaiapoi was in the name of her husband, but as he was not a member of that area, Tikini attempted to have the title amended in her own favour.

By 1915 Tikini was "very deaf", however she was active even in early 1919 entertaining a visiting group of invalid soldiers. Predeceased by her husband, she died in the house of her son Henare Parata on Saturday 19 July 1919. She was noted at the time as "probably the oldest inhabitant of the dominion".

== Ethnography ==
W. A. Taylor often gathered with Tikini among others including Mere Harper on a slope on the Huriawa Peninsula to talk about historic events. He noted that she "could speak with authority on the earliest European days". She was also among those visited by Herries Beattie.

== Plunket ==
Tikini worked among both Māori and Pākehā in the district as a midwife, tōhuka and healer. She worked for many years with Mere Harper, thirty years younger than her, to help with health issues in their community and deliver generations of children. In 1906, she and Harper delivered Thomas (Tommy) Rangiwahia Mutu Ellison. Tommy's older brother had died as a baby, so when Tommy also became ill the midwives brought him to Harper's friend, the doctor Truby King, where he thrived under their combined care. The Karitāne Home for Babies opened within a year, and, with the aid of the extensive networks established by Tikini and Harper, as well as Tikini's decades of experience and the traditional knowledge she held, soon developed into the Plunket Society.

In 2016, David Ellison, Upoko of Kāti Huirapa Rūnaka ki Puketeraki, and the son of Mutu Ellison, sought recognition for Tikini and Harper. An interpretive panel overlooking the Waikouaiti River was updated as a result, and in 2020, Plunket rebranded its logo to acknowledge its founding Māori midwives.
