= Maternal and Child Health Centre, East Kew =

Heritage-listed child health care centre in Melbourne, Victoria, Australia

- Location within Melbourne

General information
- Status: Completed
- Type: Child health care centre
- Architectural style: California bungalow
- Location: 21 Strathalbyn Street, East Kew, Melbourne, Victoria, Australia
- Coordinates: 37°47′53″S 145°03′02″E
- Opened: December 1925; 100 years ago
- Cost: £1,200

Technical details
- Material: Rendered concrete; terracotta tiles

Design and construction
- Architect: R. Chipperfield
- Main contractor: Messrs Murphy and Pearce

Website
- boroondara.vic.gov.au

Victorian Heritage Register
- Official name: Maternal and Child Health Centre
- Type: Registered place
- Designated: 8 September 2005
- Reference no.: VHR H0055
- Heritage overlay no.: HO486
- Category: Health Services

The Maternal and Child Health Centre is a child health care centre, located on City of Boroondara Council property at 21 Strathalbyn Street, in East Kew, an inner eastern suburb of Melbourne, in Victoria, Australia.

Built in 1925 on the traditional lands of the Wurundjeri people, the building was added to the Victorian Heritage Register on 8 September 2005 in recognition of its historical, architectural, and social significance.

== History ==
The idea that society should provide infant dietary help to new mothers to reduce infant mortality and in turn improve adult health was first promoted by the physician Dr Sir (Frederic) Truby King CMG (1858–1938) in 1905. Trained in medicine at Edinburgh, he became Medical Superintendent at the Seacliff Lunatic Asylum in New Zealand, where he greatly improved the health of his ailing adopted baby daughter.

In Australia, the early baby health movement was driven by committed volunteers frustrated at government inaction. Dr Isie Younger Ross OBE, who had studied infant health in England, helped set up Victoria's first baby health clinic in Richmond in 1917. By 1918 the voluntary Victorian Baby Health Centres Association (VBHCA) was formed to oversee the growing number of centres. Financial support also came from local councils and in 1926 the Victorian government formed the Infant Welfare Section of the Public Health Department and appointed Dr Vera Scantlebury as the first Director.

The Kew Council opened the municipality's first baby health centre at the Kew Town Hall on 5 November 1920. Some other councils – such as Coburg's Truby King Baby Health Centre – were also opening temporary centres around this time, apparently prompted by the pneumonic influenza epidemic. The centre built at Kew East is one of the first permanent baby health premises in Victoria. It was opened in December 1925 by the Countess of Stradbroke, who was the wife of the Earl of Stradbroke, the Governor of Victoria.

== Description ==
The building was designed by the Kew City Building Surveyor, Mr R. Chipperfield, and built by Messrs Murphy and Pearce at a cost of £1,200. The roughcast rendered Californian Bungalow-style building has some English Cottage or Arts and Crafts associations and is set in garden surroundings. With its tiled roof, boxed double-hung windows, louvred sliding shutters, heavy piers supporting a large 'L'-shaped verandah, tall chimneys and masonry flower boxes, it exemplifies the trend of early centres to mirror popular domestic architecture.

The East Kew Maternal and Child Health Centre is of architectural significance as an intact example of an early baby health care centre. As a building constructed in the Californian Bungalow style, it is important for its high degree of external integrity, in particular for its unpainted roughcast rendered exterior and stylistic detailing. Importantly, the building is representative of many subsequent baby health centres of the inter-war period built in the domestic style, a style which demonstrates a philosophical association between early baby health centre designs and the ideal suburban house, both traditionally perceived as the domain of women and children. The building is of further interest for demonstrating a concern for the health of babies by incorporating into its design good floor ventilation, flyscreens on doors and windows, a spacious verandah, and sliding, louvred window shutters.

== See also ==
- Architecture of Melbourne
- List of places on the Victorian Heritage Register in the City of Boroondara
- Truby King Baby Health Centre
