= Mothercraft Training Society =

British maternity organisation

The Mothercraft Training Society was an organization in the United Kingdom which trained expectant and new mothers, nurses, midwives, and health visitors in 'mothercraft', with the aim of bringing down infant mortality. Briefly known as the Babies of the Empire Society, before taking on its new name, it established its own infant welfare clinic, with a dietetic hospital, and ran a year-long training course from which students emerged as qualified nursery nurses.

== Origins ==
The idea that society should provide infant dietary help to new mothers to reduce infant mortality and in turn improve adult health was first promoted by the physician, Frederic Truby King (1858–1938), in 1905. Trained in medicine at Edinburgh, he became Medical Superintendent at the Seacliff Lunatic Asylum in New Zealand, where he greatly improved the health of his ailing adopted baby daughter. He trained local nurses in his infant dietary methods and in 1907 founded the Society for the Promotion of the Health of Women and Children. This later took the new name of Plunket Society, in honour of its patron, Lady Victoria Plunket, wife of the then Governor of New Zealand, William Plunket, 5th Baron Plunket, and a mother of eight.

Though Lady Victoria was a British aristocrat looking for a cause to support, she took far more than a passive role in the Plunket Society and the creation of a professional infant nursing service was said to be her idea. From 1907, the Society's nursing service was established across New Zealand and became a template for child and mother welfare groups throughout the Empire.

King's "Twelve Essentials", which were radical at the time, for the raising of healthy infants included: 'air and sunshine, water, food, clothing, bathing, muscular exercise and sensory stimulation, warmth, regularity, cleanliness, mothering, management, and rest and sleep'.

In Britain the infant welfare movement was disjointed and lacked cohesion, but towards the end of the First World War the terrible loss of life led to a realisation that one of the many problems of national reconstruction would be how to sustain an adequate population given the high level of infant mortality. A National Baby Week was held from 1 to 7 July 1917, and after this event Truby King was invited by Lady Victoria Plunket, and Winifride and Evelyn Wrench of the Over-Seas Club, to come to London to establish an infant welfare centre. Initially founded as the Babies of the Empire Society, this was later renamed as the Mothercraft Training Society.

== 29 & 31 Trebovir Road ==
A seven-year lease was purchased on two adjoining houses in Trebovir Road, Earls Court, and on Tuesday 9 July 1918 the Babies of the Empire Mothercraft Training Centre was opened with William Massey, the Prime Minister of New Zealand, presiding. The Babies of the Empire Society, of which Lord Plunket was Chairman and Truby King medical Director, was affiliated with St Thomas' Hospital and remained headquartered in the General Buildings, Aldwych. The Matron was Miss A. Pattrick, and the aim of the new Centre was "to give a sound, simple, thorough grounding in the everyday needs of home and nursing" with a wish to "make the course practical, helpful, and domestic, to encourage and stimulate commonsense and resourcefulness, and to render the knowledge conveyed as interesting and as widely applicable and adaptable as possible."

== Cromwell House ==
In 1924 the Society bought a lease of Cromwell House, a 17th-century mansion in Highgate. After improvements, including installing electricity and central heating, the Mothercraft Training Centre opened in 1925. By now, the Matron was Mabel Liddiard CBE, one of the founders of the Society. She published a book, The Mothercraft Manual (1925) of which there were altogether twelve editions, the last in 1954. At Cromwell House the Society ran both a dietetic hospital and an infant welfare clinic, and trained expectant mothers, midwives, nurses, and health visitors, as well as running a long vocational course for nursery nurses. It had 25 cots for infants to be admitted when found to have malnutrition or to be suffering from digestive problems, in general from about the age of four weeks. A few healthy babies also came into the hostel; each of them had its own nurse. The mothers nursed their infants in the hostel and paid according to how much they could afford; if they were very poor, no charge was made. Some mothers acted as maids. The nursing staff were qualified nurses, who stayed at the hostel for some three months, or midwives with a CBM qualification, who came for between four and six months, and finally unqualified student nurses, who typically stayed for one year. These, if at the end they passed the Society's examination, were then qualified to work as nursery nurses. Mothers, both prospective and new, were shown how to breastfeed correctly, how to ensure a good dietary plan, and also to know the symptoms of the common causes of infant deaths, diarrhoea and malnutrition.

== Princess Elizabeth of York Hostel ==
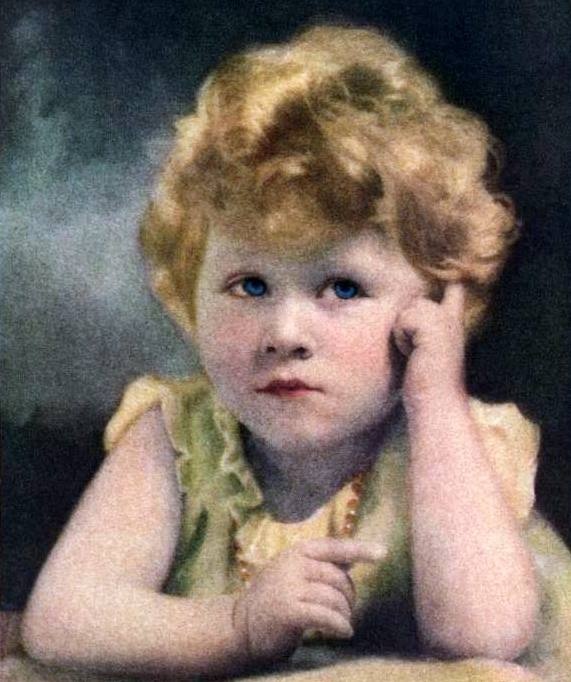
Princess Elizabeth of York, pictured in 1929

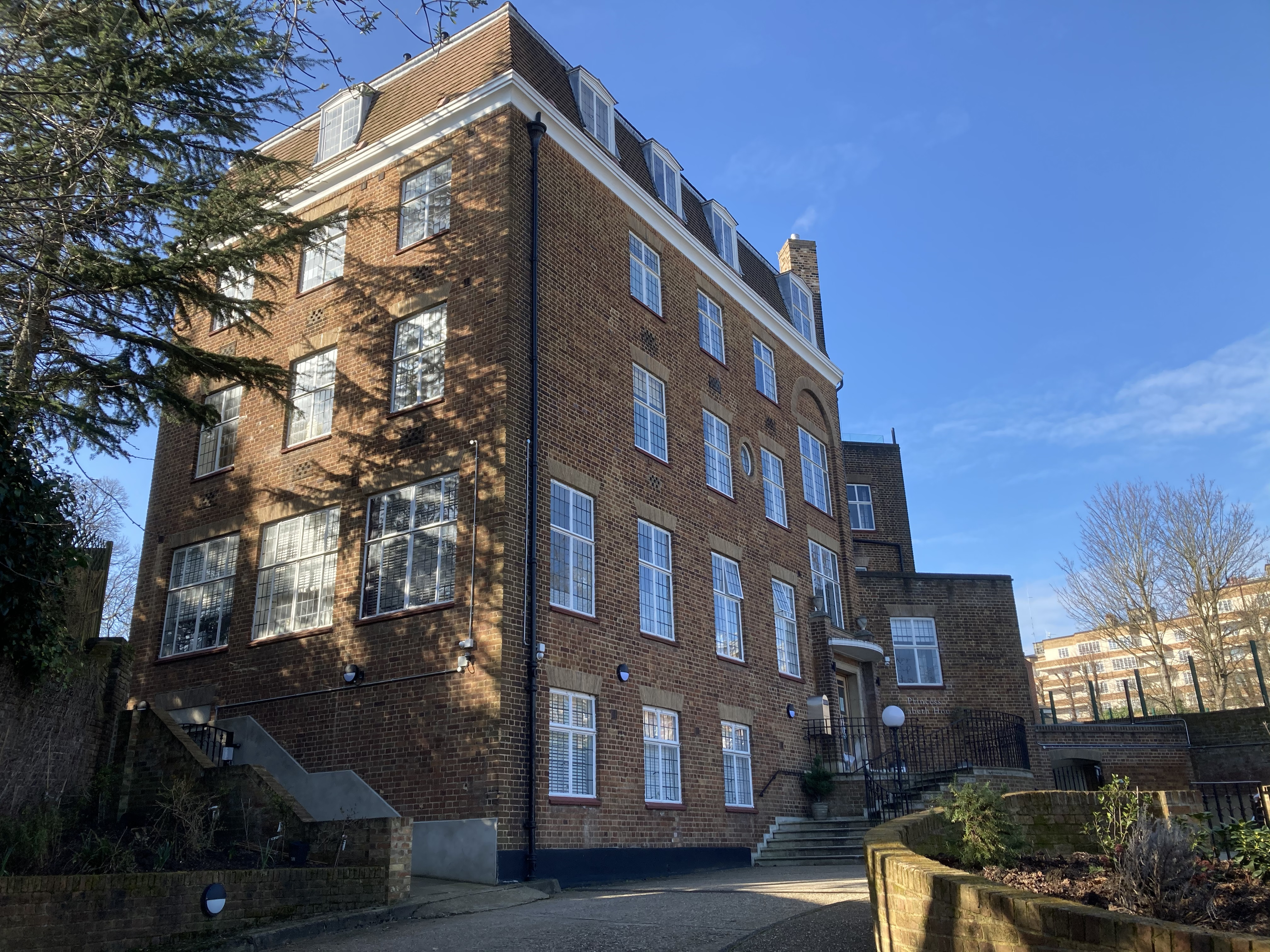
The Princess Elizabeth of York Hostel, now Elizabeth House

The Society decided that it needed to expand its residential capacity and started a public subscription appeal which by 1928 had raised £25,000, enough for a new annex in the Cromwell House grounds, accessed from Winchester Place at the rear, to be called the Princess Elizabeth of York Hostel. Designed by the architects Richardson and Gill in a Neo-Georgian style, the building was opened on 26 November 1930 by the Duchess of York, the wife of the future King George VI and mother of Princess Elizabeth of York, after whom the new facility was named. The Duchess had been president of the Society since 1923 and was herself a new mother at the opening, the future Queen Elizabeth's younger sister Princess Margaret Rose having been born in August 1930. Royal patronage was important for the Society, particularly in its aim to encourage new baby-care techniques, which demanded a change in attitude amongst new mothers. In the light and airy surroundings of the new hostel, innovative methods of infant care were taught by live-in nurses to mothers who would stay for a fixed term. There was also a programme of open days and lectures to teach the principles of baby care for the benefit of nurses who worked elsewhere.

== Later years ==
In 1939 the Centre became the Truby King Home for Children and during World War II the rear of both Cromwell House and the Princess Elizabeth of York Hostel suffered minor bomb damage.

In 1951 the Mothercraft Training Society closed. Cromwell House (listed Grade I) was sold to the Church of England Zenana Missionary Society and is now the Visa Section of the High Commission of the Republic of Ghana. The Princess Elizabeth of York Hostel is now a Grade II listed building and was sold separately to the Metropolitan Police to house police officers. It was subsequently sold by the Metropolitan Police to the Unite Group who converted it to student accommodation, with gross floor area of 1,618 square metres (17,409 square foot) and 87 bedrooms, and named it Greenview Court. In September 2011 Unite granted a 10 year lease to Britannia Travel Services Ltd and marketed the freehold for sale as an investment for £7,250,000. The building was refurbished in 2016 by JMS Estates Ltd and continues to be used as hostel accommodation under the name Elizabeth House.

Sir Truby King, who died in Wellington on 10 February 1938, was the first private citizen in New Zealand to be given a state funeral and twenty years later was the first New Zealander to feature on a New Zealand postage stamp.

Mabel Liddiard CBE was president of the Royal College of Midwives from 1943 to 1952. She died on 31 March 1962 and is buried on the east side of Highgate Cemetery.

The archives of the Mothercraft Training Society were deposited with the Highgate Literary and Scientific Institution.

== Gallery ==
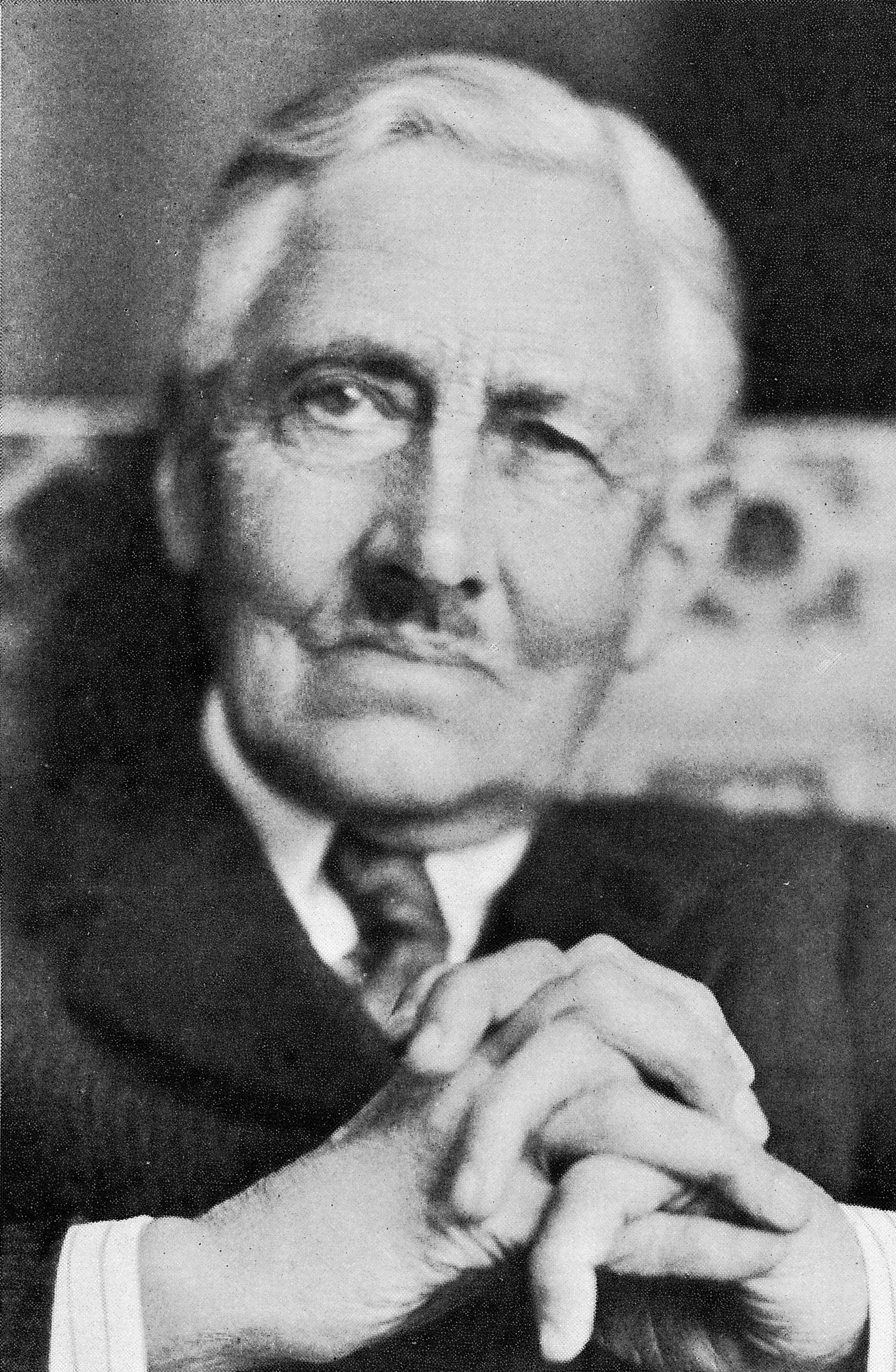
Sir Frederic Truby King

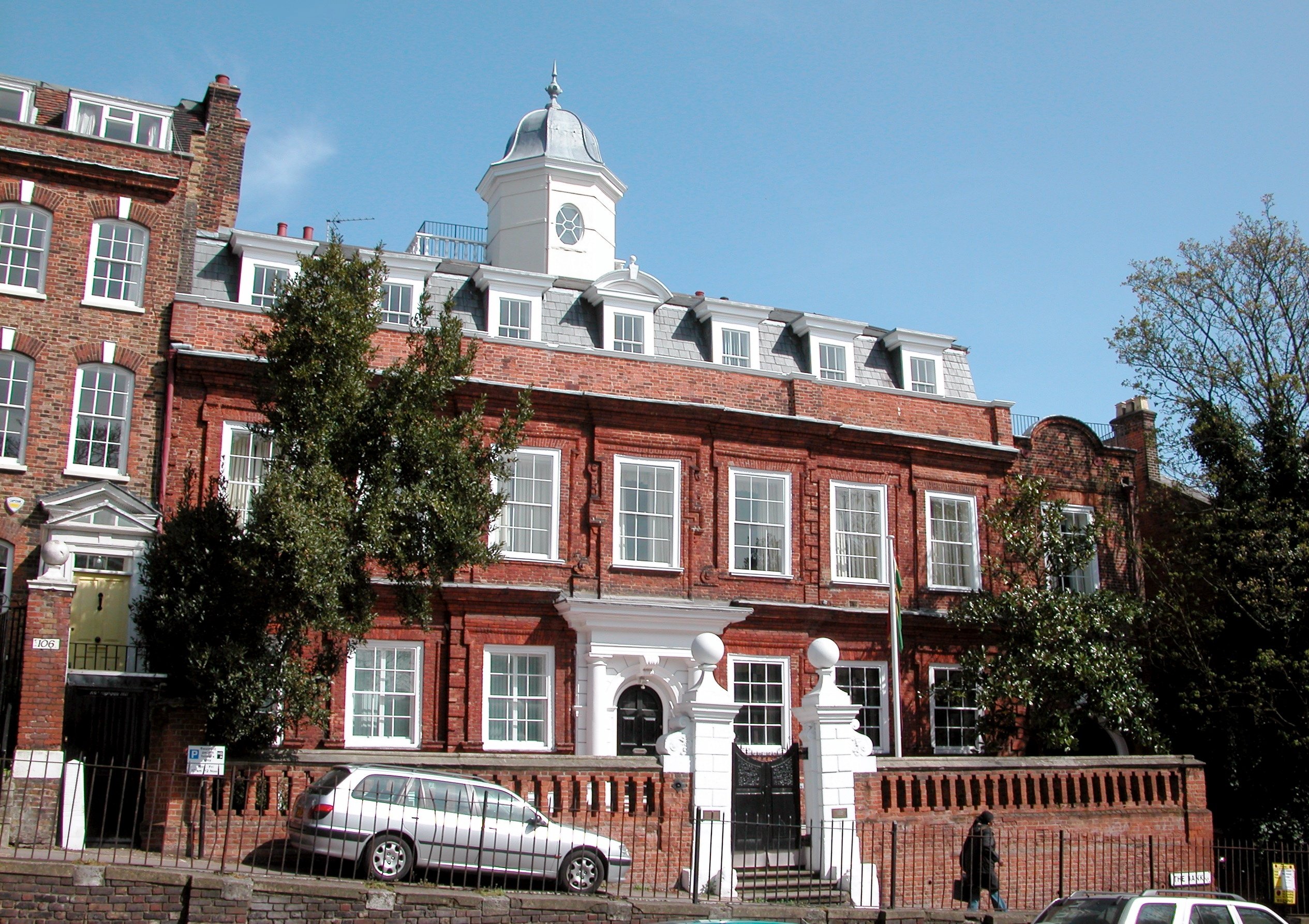
Cromwell House, Highgate

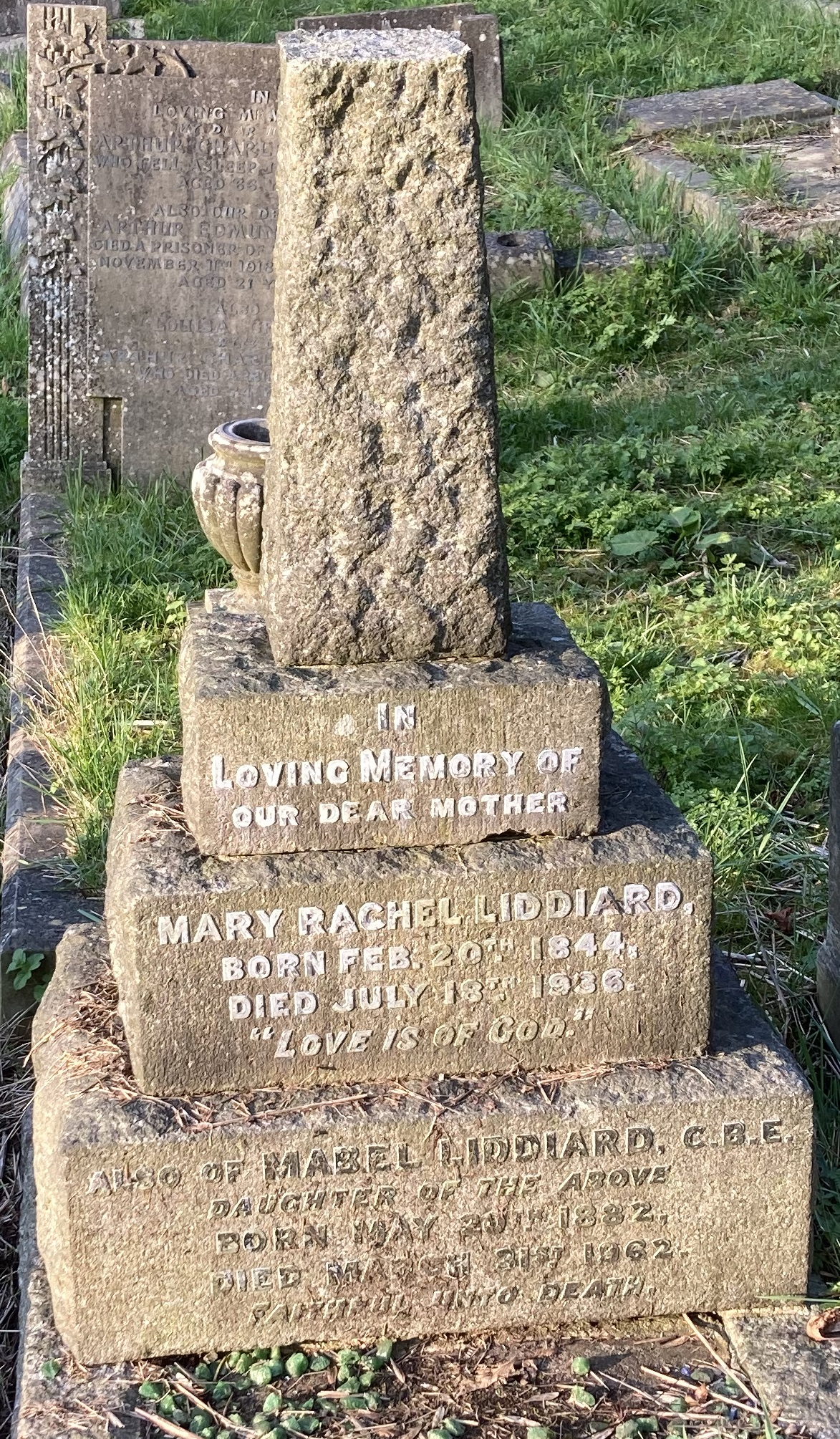
Grave of Mabel Liddiard in Highgate Cemetery (east side)

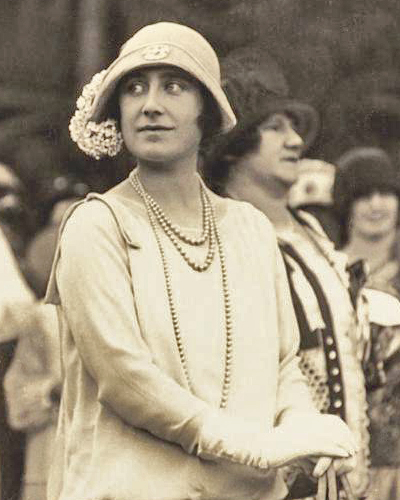
HRH the Duchess of York

== Bibliography ==
- King, M. T. (1934). Mothercraft. London: Whitcombe and Tombs Ltd..
- King, Sir Dr. Truby. The Expectant Mother and Baby's First Months. London: MacMillan and Co. Ltd..
- King, Sir Dr. Truby. (1930). Feeding and Care of Baby. London: MacMillan and Co. Ltd..
- Liddiard, M. (1924). The Mothercraft Manual or the Expectant and Nursing Mother - and Baby's First Two Years. London: J.& A. Churchill.
