= Newton King =

Newton King (21 July 1855 – 27 July 1927) was a New Zealand auctioneer, merchant and businessman. He was born in New Plymouth, New Zealand, on 21 July 1855.

King was born in New Plymouth into a leading local family. His father, Thomas King, was a Member of Parliament and Provincial Treasurer on the Taranaki Provincial Council, as well as being a prominent local businessman. His brother, Truby King was a leading doctor and paediatrician, and founder of the Plunket Society.

After education at William Crompton's school, he became a clerk at the mercantile and shipping company Webster Brothers, before co-founding his own stock and station agency with Robert Bauchope in 1880. The new business, Newton King Limited, took off and expanded, becoming leading rural auctioneers and dealing in both seed and grain and in imports and exports. In 1900, retail branches were established throughout Taranaki. In 1888 King was one of the founders of the Crown Dairy Company, along with James George and Richard Cock, and by 1897 it was New Zealand second largest dairy product company.

Newton King was a strong supporter of development of New Plymouth harbour and was chairman of the harbour board from 1917 to 1922. A wharf completed in 1925 was named after him. Newton King died at his home, Brooklands, in 1927, survived by his wife, three sons and two daughters.
