= All Peoples' Association =

- Founded: 1930
- Founder: Sir Evelyn Wrench

The All Peoples' Association was a voluntary organisation to foster international amity, established in London in 1930 by Sir Evelyn Wrench, founder of the English-Speaking Union and Royal Overseas League.

Membership was organised as national clubs offering evening lectures, libraries, magazines and language courses. Membership in one country's club automatically conferred membership of the worldwide organisation.

The APA particularly attempted to foster Anglo-German understanding in the 1930s, but this became increasingly untenable as World War II approached, and it went bankrupt in 1936.
