= Mere Harper =

New Zealand porter, cultural informant, and midwife (1842–1924)

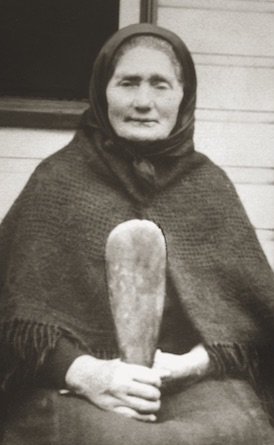
Harper between 1904 and 1919

Mere (Mary) Harper (7 May 1842 – 30 May 1924), born Mary Apes / Mere Hipi and also known as Big Mary or Mere Hapa was a porter, cultural informant, and midwife of Kāi Tahu and Kāti Huirapa descent. She was the main informant for ethnographer William Anderson Taylor's work on Kāi Tahu history, and is credited as one of the midwives who paved the way for the creation of the Plunket Society of New Zealand.

== Family and early life ==
Mere's mother was Mata Punahere. Originally from Arowhenua, she probably came to Puketeraki for shelter during the 1830s war with Ngāti Toa, and became known there as a "very honest" woman trusted with unlimited credit at the local store.

Her father Elisha Apes, later known as William, was a Pequot born in 1815 in Groton, Connecticut, younger half-brother to William Apess. He also had European ancestry on at least his father's side, and was described as a "dark man" and as having "flaxen-coloured hair and blue eyes". He went to sea in 1832 as a whaleman and by 1839 worked on the Ann Maria on its voyage to New Zealand. Known as a big and powerful man, in support of a shipmate's protest against the captain's mistreatment of the ship's boy he fought with the ship's mate and seized the captain's firearms. As the crew refused to put down the mutiny, the captain agreed to put the two men ashore at the next port, Port Chalmers. Subsequently Apes lived with Punahere at Waikouaiti, later known as Karitāne, and worked at the whaling station.

Mere Apes was born on 7 May 1842, the eldest of six surviving children. Her surviving siblings were William, George, James (Tiemi), Thomas (Tamati or Tame), and Kitty (Kiti). Her parents married at the Wesleyan Mission church on 10 August 1844 by Charles Creed, another missionary having taken a dim view of the practice of 'concubinage'. Unlike some Europeans marrying at the same time, her father was literate enough to sign his name instead of marking an X. The family was bilingual, but Mere and her siblings favoured Te Reo Māori, as evidenced by her preferred name Mere Hipi over the English Mary Apes. On 18 July 1848, at age 6, Mere was baptised in the Wesleyan Mission church as "Mary Apes", while her mother was christened Caroline.

When the whaling station closed down in the mid-1840s, her father worked as a fisherman, and did wage work on nearby farms as labourer and shepherd. By 1851 the family lived in a clay house, grew wheat and potatoes, and raised pigs and cattle. Mere probably attended the local mission school.

== Marriage and early employment as a porter ==
Like her father, Mere was large (reportedly six feet high and weighing 16 stone) and strong, and was nicknamed Big Mary. She earned money as a porter, meeting boats from ships arriving at Waikouaiti and carrying passengers ashore on her back. At about the age of 21, she won a wager by carrying three men with their baggage at once: one on her back and one under each arm. If anyone tried to spur her on with his heels, she was quick to dunk them in the water.

Mere married William Harper in 1863, an Englishman and a former captain, with whom she had one child, William (jr). From that time she sometimes went by Mere Hapa.

In 1872 her husband was appointed deputy harbourmaster of the port, and later lighthouse keeper on the Huriawa peninsula. From about 1876 they lived there in the lighthouse. On New Year's Day 1877 Mere won the women's dinghy race at the Waikouaiti Regatta, while her husband won the "Whaler's race". In the 1880s, the new railway ended the port trade and thus the need for a staffed lighthouse. Mere's husband turned to work as a fisherman. At one point he visited England to secure an inheritance but, despite gossip that he might stay, returned again to Mere.

In 1874 Mere's mother died and was buried, with a large carved headstone, in the cemetery above Puketeraki. Mere's father died in December 1891 and, having remarried, was buried separately from her mother.

== Activism and ethnography ==
Along with her mother and siblings, Mere was involved in a land claim dating back to 1845. Walter Mantell recommended crown grants for the Apes family in 1854, and in 1863 asked for these claims to be resolved. However nothing was done until 1877 when an Act of Parliament was passed to finally resolve these claims. Even in 1886 her father and brother Tiemi Hipi had to write to Māori MP Tame Parata to enquire about it, but eventually that year Mere and her sister Kiti Hipi Pohio were granted eight acres each, while her brothers received ten acres each.

In 1905 it was proposed to build public toilets on the foreshore near Waikouaiti. Mere protested as the site was where an ancestor Hine Koraku had been buried. By this time she was among the oldest residents of the area, and this knowledge of place names, sacred places, and traditions made her an invaluable informant to Pākehā ethnographers. She and her brother Tamati were interviewed by Herries Beattie between 1900 and 1920, and she provided information on Māori house types and construction to Harry Skinner.

She worked perhaps most closely with William Anderson Taylor. Her house was located close by a slope on the Huriawa peninsula where Taylor gathered with Kāi Tahu elders. She was his main informant for the history of Puketeraki. In fact he considered her his "best informant" and recalled that she and he had "sat often in those days that are gone, well into the night, going over stories of the past on the slopes of Karitane". Along with Tame Parata and others, she provided many placenames for the lists in his notebooks. The conversations Taylor had with Mere and her circle about placenames and history inevitably raised the issue of the Kāi Tahu land grievances, and these injustices drew his interest and concern.

== Midwifery and the Plunket Society ==
Mere also worked among both Māori and Pākehā in the district as a midwife, tōhuka and healer. She worked for half a century with Ria Tikini, thirty years older than her, to help with health issues in their community and deliver generations of children. She also was neighbours and friends with doctor Truby King, often peeling potatoes from his garden and baking them on hot embers while they discussed the health of families in the area. In 1906, she and Ria delivered Thomas (Tommy) Rangiwahia Mutu Ellison. Tommy's older brother had died as a baby, so when Tommy also became ill the midwives brought him to Dr King, where he thrived under their combined care. The Karitāne Home for Babies opened within a year, and, with the aid of the extensive networks established by Mere and Ria, as well as their decades of experience and the traditional knowledge they held, soon developed into the Plunket Society.

== Death and posthumous recognition ==
Mere died on 30 May 1924 at age 82, having lived her whole life in Waikouaiti. She was buried at Puketeraki.

W.A. Taylor wrote several newspaper articles in the 1930s and 1940s drawing on the information she provided, and published Lore and History of the South Island Maori in 1952. A photo of Mere, modified from an unpublished photo Taylor had taken which included Ria Tikini and a man possibly her son, was included in that book. In the photo she wears a dark scarf, shawl and skirt, and holds a large pounamu mere in her lap.

In 2016, David Ellison, Upoko of Kāti Huirapa Rūnaka ki Puketeraki, and the son of Mutu Ellison, sought recognition for Mere and Ria. An interpretive panel overlooking the Waikouaiti River was updated as a result, and in 2020, Plunket rebranded its logo to acknowledge its founding Māori midwives.
