= E. M. King =

Eliza Mary King (née Richardson, 1831–1911), better known as Mrs E M King, was a New Zealand feminist who campaigned in England and the United States for repeal of the Contagious Diseases Acts; world peace, co-operative housekeeping, rational dress reform and the agrarian reform policies of the American Farmers Alliance.

== Family life ==
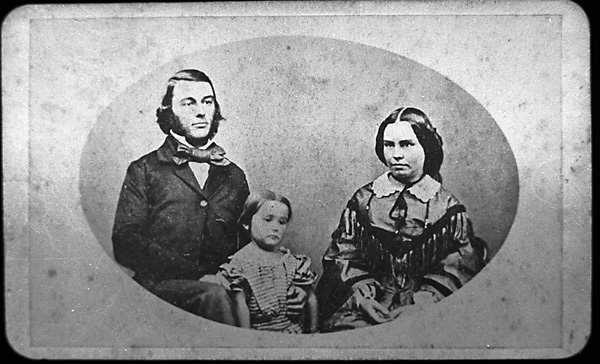
Mrs E.M. King with her husband, William Cutfield King and their elder daughter, Alice Mary King

Eliza Mary Richardson was the third child of Thomas Watkin Richardson, an Oxford-educated lawyer of the Inner Temple, and Mary Anne Richardson (Whittington). Like her elder siblings, Katherine (de Vouex) and William, who died young, Eliza was born in Offenbach am Main, Germany. In 1852, some years after their return from Germany to England, the family migrated to New Zealand and settled at New Plymouth in the Taranaki region. Eliza married William Cutfield King (1829–1861) and by him had two daughters, Constance Ada (1859–1955) and Alice Mary (1855–1932). Her father, Thomas Richardson died in January 1861 and William King, a captain in the Taranaki Rifle Volunteers and newly elected to the New Zealand Parliament, was ambushed and killed in the Second Taranaki War a month later. After this double bereavement, and with New Plymouth under siege from the Maori forces, Eliza, her daughters and the remaining members of her family sought refuge in Tasmania.

She was not long in Tasmania. Early in 1863, Eliza, Constance and Alice returned to New Plymouth where she wrote Truth. Love. Joy. or the Fruits of the Garden of Eden, a polemical feminist critique of the Old Testament and the gospel of St Paul. The theologian John Colenso was an important influence. The book was published in 1864 in Australia and England where it was promoted by the atheist George Holyoake. Her name is shown on the title page as E. M. King, an authorial designation that she preserved in all subsequent publications. In the preface she revealed, after some hesitation, that she was a woman and that she had taken Ralph Waldo Emerson as her inspiration for independent thought.

== Campaigns and polemics ==
In 1870 Mrs E M King, as she was thereafter known, returned to England with her daughters, where she almost immediately joined Josephine Butler in the campaign against the Contagious Diseases Acts, which regulated prostitution in the English port cities. In 1870–72 King was active as a street protest organiser, speechmaker, polemicist and member of the executive committee of the Ladies National Association for the Repeal of the Contagious Diseases Acts.

During 1872–1875, King became a familiar figure in English public debate. In 1872 she established the short-lived Women's International Peace Society' and delivered public lectures the role of women in the peace movement, the science of domestic economy and the necessity for cooperative housekeeping Her lectures and publications advocating cooperative houses drew on the work of the American feminist, Melusina Fay Peirce. In 1873 King commissioned the architect, Edward William Godwin, to draw plans for an associated living complex that would provide accommodation for 100 or more residents.

The scheme failed, however, to secure financial backing. With the exception of a lecture in Dublin in 1878 on equal suffrage, King appears to have withdrawn from public life between 1875 and 1881. For part of this time she was resident in Dresden, Germany with her daughters. While there she wrote to Florence Pomeroy, Viscountess Harberton in support of her views on dress reform and, on her return to England in 1882, they established the Rational Dress Society with Lady Harberton as president and King as honorary secretary. King resumed her public role with addresses and publications on dress reform and announced that the Rational Dress Society would stage an exhibition in 1883. As a consequence of dissension within the Society, King established a rival organisation, the Rational Dress Association, which staged a Rational Dress Exhibition in Princes Hall at 190–196 Piccadilly, The Rational Dress Exhibition opened with a speech by King and ran from 18 May to 12 June 1883, before touring provincial cities.

In 1884 King left England with her companion Elizabeth, ‘Nellie’ Glen (1848?–1900), for Canada and the United States, where they continued the campaign for rational dress reform. In 1886 King and Nellie Glen bought an orange grove in Melrose in northern Florida, where she soon became involved in the agrarian reform movement of the Farmers Alliance as a newspaper editor, columnist and ‘county lecturer’. In 1890 King and Nellie Glen established the Melrose Ladies Literary and Debating Society, one of the first women's clubs in Florida, now known as the 'Melrose Women's Club'. King delivered her last public lecture in Melrose in 1907 on ‘Scandal: its Right and its Wrong Side’. She returned to New Zealand later in that year to live with her daughters and died in 1911 in Omata not far from her marital home in New Plymouth. She was buried in a railed enclosure in the grounds of the Taranaki Cathedral Church of St Mary, with her husband, William Cutfield King and her father, Thomas Watkin Richardson.

== Beliefs, principles and philosophy ==
King believed the similarities between men and women were more significant than their differences. She argued that the differences were amplified, to the disadvantage of both sexes, by the prevailing political, theological and domestic conventions and prejudices of British and American society. In her public addresses, publications and campaigns for cooperative housekeeping and rational dress reform she was particularly influenced by the sociologist Herbert Spencer.

== Selected publications ==
=== Books and pamphlets ===
- Truth. Love. Joy. or The Garden of Eden and its Fruits, Melbourne, 1864, (i–xi, 1–416) published in Melbourne by the author, printed by Clarson, Shallard & Co. Two versions were printed, differentiated only by their title pages, one for sale in Australia and one for sale in England and Scotland. Copies are available from many sources for download on the internet. Most have corrupted text and many wrongly attribute the book to a fictive 'Emma' King.
- Rational Dress, or, the Dress of Women and Savages (London, Kegan Paul, Trench & Co, 1882)
- The Exhibition of the Rational Dress Association, (London, Wyman 1883). Reprinted in Catalogue of Exhibits and Gazette, The Rational Dress Association, (New York, Garland Publishing 1978).

=== Journal and newspaper articles ===
- ‘Work of an International Peace Society, and Woman’s Place in it’, Women's Suffrage Journal, 1 October 1872, 137.
- ‘Co-operative Housekeeping’, Contemporary Review, vol 23, (1873: Dec-1874: May) 66–91.
- 'Women's Suffrage', Victoria Magazine, vol 32 (1879) 265–7
- ‘Tricycle Riding for Ladies’, Knowledge, vol 2, 7 July 1882, 95, reprinted from the Monthly Gazette of the Bicycle Touring Club, 1882.
- ‘Rational Dress for Men and Women’, Building News, 11 May 1883, 624–6. This is the text for Mrs King's Princes Hall address. delivered on 9 May 1883, as a prelude to the Rational Dress Exhibition.
- ’How Shall Women Dress?’ (Symposium: E M King, Charles Dudley Warner, Elizabeth Stuart Phelps, William A Hammond and Kate J Jackson), The North American Review, vol 140, no 343, (June 1885), 557–571.
- ‘Full Measure: A “Yard Stick” Invented by a Florida Woman and Submitted to the People for Adoption’,Republic County Freeman, (Bellville, Kansas), 20 November 1890, 6.
- ‘The Bible and Women’s Rights’, The Woman’s Tribune, vol 8, Issue 39 (1891), 311.
- ‘In Favour of the Sub-Treasury Plan’, Florida Dispatch, Farmer and Fruitgrower, 23 July 1891, 593–4
- ‘Neither Sect nor Sex in Politics’, Florida Dispatch, Farmer and Fruitgrower, 8 October 1891, 813.
- ‘The Human Dress’, Arena, vol 6, 1892, 627–30.

== Bibliography ==
- Judith R Walkowitz, Prostitution and Victorian Society: Women, Class, and the State (CUP, 1980).
- Heloise Brown, The Truest Form of Patriotism: Pacifist Feminism in Britain, 1870–1902 (2003, Manchester University Press).
- Lynn F Pearson, The Architectural and Social History of Cooperative Living (Macmillan, 1988), 37.
- Stella M Newton, Heath, Art and Reason: Dress Reformers of the 19th Century (1974, John Murray),
- Patricia A Cunningham, Reforming Women’s Fashion, 1850–1920: Politics, Health and Art (Kent State University Press, 2003)
- Jessie Hamm Meyer, Leading the Way: A Century of Service.and Beyond! ( Createspace, United States, 2015)
- Zonira Hunter Tolles, Bonnie Melrose: The Early History of Melrose, Florida (1982) Storter Printing Company, Gainesville, Fla.
