= William Cutfield King =

New Zealand politician

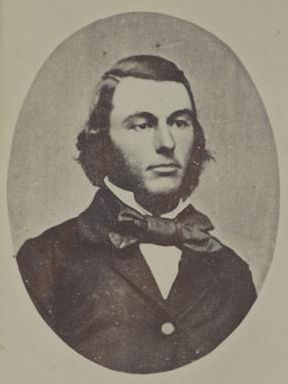
- Capt. W. C. King

Member of the New Zealand Parliament for Grey and Bell
- In office November 1860 – February 1861

Personal details
- Born: 1829 Devonshire; England
- Died: 8 February 1861 (aged 32) New Plymouth; New Zealand
- Resting place: St Mary's Church cemetery, New Plymouth
- Spouse: Eliza Mary King
- Children: Two daughters
- Profession: Farmer, soldier, politician

William Cutfield King (1829 – 8 February 1861) was a 19th-century New Zealand politician who was elected to Parliament, but was killed in the New Zealand Wars before the first session.

== Early life ==
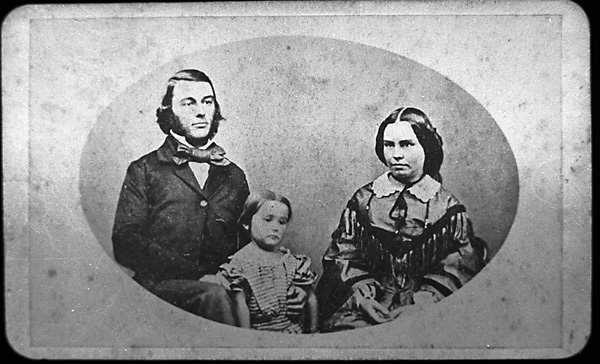
King with his wife and daughter

King was born in Devonshire, England in 1829 as the only child of Captain Henry King (1783–1874) and his wife Mary Anne. He was twelve years old in 1841 when he came to New Zealand with his parents on board the Amelia Thompson. His father was the first commissioner of Taranaki.

== Member of Parliament ==
New Zealand Parliament
Years	Term	Electorate	Party
1860–1861	3rd	Grey and Bell	Independent

William Cutfield King and Thomas King (no relation) contested the Grey and Bell electorate in the 1860 election. On nomination day, the contestants addressed the electors and at the end of the meeting, the returning officer requested a show of hands, which was declared to be in favour of Thomas King. Consequently, W. C. King requested an election, which was held on Tuesday, 27 November 1860. W. C. King and T. King received 93 and 34 votes, respectively, and William Cutfield King was thus duly elected to represent the electorate in the 3rd New Zealand Parliament.

== Death ==
The First Taranaki War was an armed conflict over land ownership and sovereignty that took place between Māori and the European settlers in the Taranaki Province from March 1860 to March 1861. King was a captain of the local volunteer forces. His farm, known as Woodleigh, was just outside the town of New Plymouth (what is now the suburb of Frankleigh Park) within sight of the garrison on Marsland Hill. He occasionally went there to look after his cattle. On 8 February 1861, he was shot by Ngāti Ruanui after reaching his farm. He tried to flee, but his horse had also been wounded. He could not escape in time and was killed by further shots fired at close range.

King was 32 years old when he died, and was survived by his wife, Mrs E. M. King, and two daughters (the younger daughter was Constance Ada).

New Zealand Parliament
Preceded by Thomas King	Member of Parliament for Grey and Bell; 1860–1861	Succeeded by Harry Atkinson
