= Leilah Gordon =

Scottish born New Zealand nurse, midwife and welfare worker

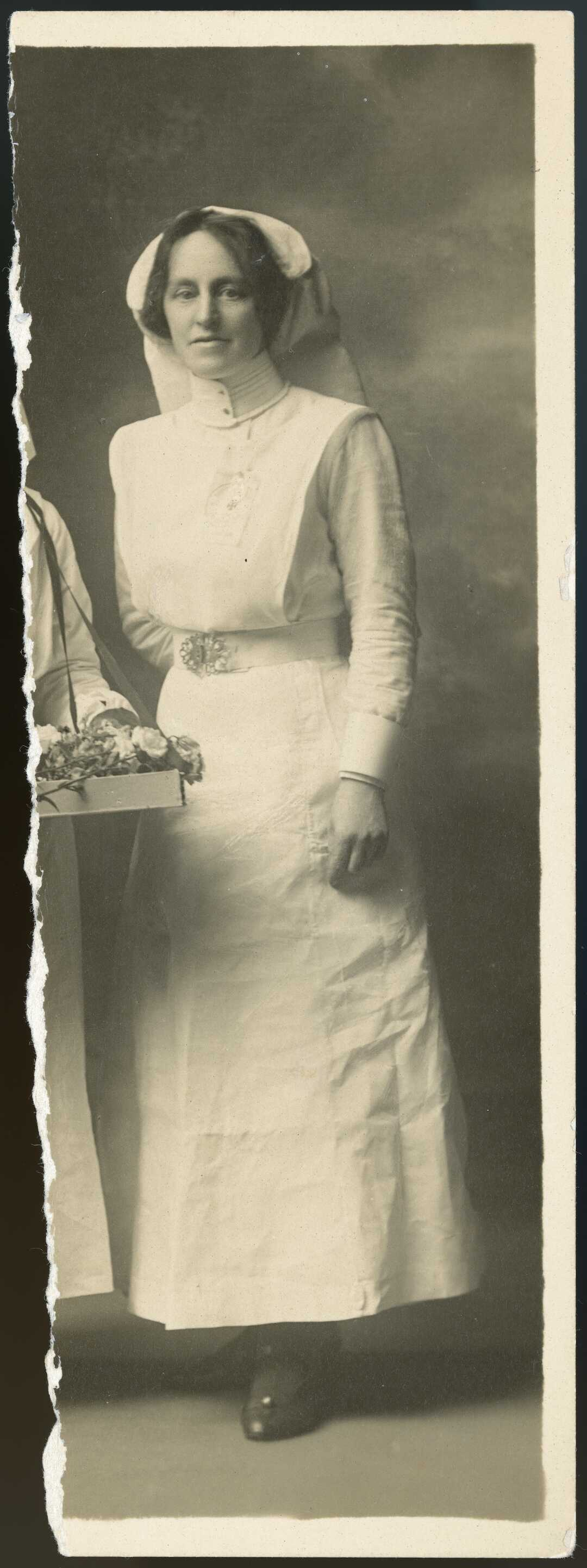

Eliza "Leilah" Gordon (née Urquhart; 29 January 1877 – 15 June 1938) was a New Zealand nurse, midwife and welfare worker.

Gordon was born in Glasgow, Lanarkshire, Scotland on 29 January 1877, emigrating with her family to Dunedin in 1880. In 1902 she married William Gordon who she met while they were both working at the Seacliff Lunatic Asylum, he as a painter and she as an attendant.

Gordon's first daughter Ngarita Inez Gordon was born in 1902 or 1903. Her second daughter, Esther Loreena Gordon was born in January 1904. By this time William was unwell; he was forced to give up work and returned to Dunedin leaving Gordon in difficult circumstances. She was pressured by Truby King, the medical superintendent of Seacliff, and his wife Bella, who were childless, to give up Esther for adoption. The baby was adopted by the Kings around July 1904, though Lloyd Chapman in his biography of Truby King notes there were conflicting accounts of the adoption. Esther became known as Mary King and was not permitted as she grew up to have any contact with Gordon.

Gordon trained in midwifery at St Helens Hospital in Dunedin passing exams in 1906. She later became a visiting nurse working for the Child Welfare Branch of the Department of Education with disadvantaged children, particularly with those who were illegitimate. She retired from that position in 1932 after which she probably worked as a maternity nurse.

She died in Dunedin on 15 June 1938.

== Publications ==
- 'After events'. Kai Tiaki: the journal of the nurses of New Zealand, Volume IV, Issue 1, 1 January 1911, p. 32
- Gordon, Leilah. (1935). Poems. Dunedin: S.N. Brown & Co.
