= Isie Younger Ross =

Australian medical practitioner (1887–1956)

Isie Younger Ross OBE
- Born: Isabella Henrietta Younger; 15 July 1887; Warrnambool, Victoria, Australia
- Died: 2 April 1956 (aged 68); South Yarra, Victoria, Australia
- Occupation: Medical practitioner

Isabella Henrietta Younger Ross OBE (15 July 1887 – 2 April 1956), better known as Isie Younger Ross, was an Australian medical practitioner best known for her work in opening the first clinic for babies in Victoria.

== Early life and education ==
Ross was born in Warrnambool, Victoria on 15 July 1887, the first child born to Henrietta (née Dawson) and storekeeper John Younger. She completed her secondary education as dux at Hohenlohe College in Warrnambool and passed the matriculation examination for the University of Melbourne in 1905.

She began a medical degree at the University of Melbourne in 1910, before moving to Scotland where she graduated with an MB ChB from the University of Glasgow in 1914.

== Career ==
Following graduation, Ross worked in Glasgow and Edinburgh in the slums in 1914–15. She subsequently moved to London for an appointment as house physician at Queen's Hospital for Children. While in London she also worked at the Lying-In hospital, and when she had spare time she would visit Waterloo station and assist the convoys of wounded World War I soldiers arriving at the station in ambulance trains transfer to Red Cross ambulances. In 1916, she worked for a time in a military hospital in Kent. She left in 1917 to study child welfare in Chicago with Dr Herman Bundesen, arriving back in Australia in June that year.

With help from Mrs. J. J. Hemphill, in 1917 she established the Baby Health Centre at Richmond, the first in Victoria. In 1918, she was subsequently involved in the formation of the Victorian Baby Health Centres Association (VBHCA). The VBHCA appointed Dr. Vera Scantlebury as the Medical Officer, and Sister Muriel Peck to run the training school.

In October 1919 it was reported that 2,804 babies had been cared for in eight centres in Melbourne and Geelong. By 1921, twenty centres, had received some government funding, and had temporarily established operations in suburban and country locations. The first purpose-built centre was officially opened in December 1925, as the East Kew Maternal and Child Health Centre.

Ross was appointed an Officer of the Order of the British Empire in the 1938 King's Birthday Honours for her services as "secretary, Baby Health Centre Association of Victoria".

She was a member of the Lyceum Club and served as president from 1938 to 1940.

== Publications ==
- Ross, Isie Younger (1929). Feeding the child – all ages : foods that promote growth, health, mental and physical development. Frederick Warne.
- Ross, Isie Younger (1940). The happy mother and child. Robertson & Mullens.

== Personal life, death and legacy ==
Ross married Australian merchant John Ross on 8 April 1916 in London. Their only son died in New Guinea during World War II.

She died on 2 April 1956 at her home in Clowes Street, South Yarra at age 68 and was cremated following a service at Scots' Church, Melbourne. Her husband predeceased her in 1955.

A fashion show was held in August 1956 at the Menzies Hotel in Melbourne to raise money for the Isabella Younger Ross Memorial Fund and a plaque recognising her life's work was later unveiled at the Queen Elizabeth Maternal and Child Welfare Centre in Carlton, Melbourne.
