= 1860 Grey and Bell by-election =

New Zealand by-election

The 1860 Grey and Bell by-election was a by-election held on 28 May during the 2nd New Zealand Parliament in the Taranaki electorate of Grey and Bell.

The by-election was caused by the resignation of the incumbent MP Charles Brown.

The by-election was won by Thomas King.

King was unopposed, and was duly declared elected.
