= Thomas King (New Zealand politician) =

New Zealand politician and Member of Parliament

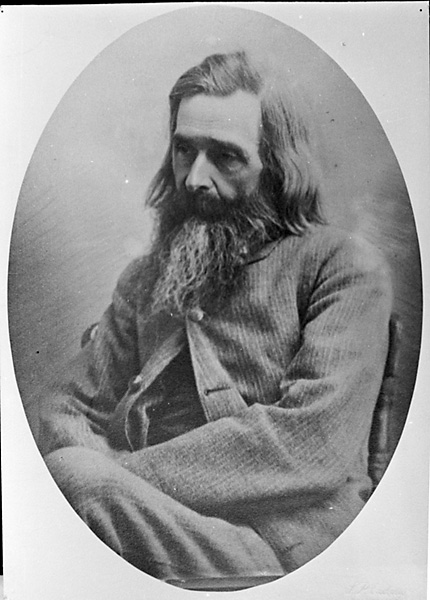
- Thomas King

Member of the New Zealand Parliament for Grey and Bell
- In office 1853 New Zealand general election – 1855
- In office 1860–1860

Personal details
- Born: 21 November 1821 London; England
- Died: 28 April 1893 (aged 71) New Plymouth; New Zealand
- Resting place: Te Henui Cemetery, New Plymouth
- Spouse: Mary King (née Chilman)
- Children: Truby King; Newton King
- Education: Oxford University
- Profession: Manager, soldier, politician

Thomas King (21 November 1821 – 28 April 1893) was a 19th-century New Zealand politician. He served in the 1st and 2nd Parliaments, and was otherwise active in New Plymouth. He was one of the first settlers, coming out on the first ship to New Plymouth in 1841.

== Early life ==
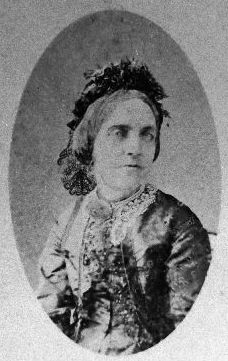
Mary Chilman, wife of Thomas King

King was born in London on 21 November 1821. He received his education at the City of London School and then at Oxford University.

He came to New Zealand in March 1841 on the William Bryan. He married Mary Chilman (born in London), the daughter of the New Plymouth settler Richard Chilman, in 1846. She was the sister of Richard Chilman, the local secretary of the Plymouth Company. The Kings had seven children.

== Political career ==
King was a member of the Taranaki Provincial Council, serving as provincial treasurer.

=== Member of Parliament ===
New Zealand Parliament
Years	Term	Electorate	Party
1853–55	1st	Grey and Bell	Independent
1860	2nd	Grey and Bell	Independent

King served in the 1st New Zealand Parliament for Grey and Bell and resigned on 22 June 1855. He declared himself "tired of political life with its anxieties, cares, and responsibilities – with my severance from my home and my family". Financial worries may also have played a part – King was not by any means wealthy, and was consequently a notable champion of remuneration and expenses for MPs.

He entered Parliament again during its second term in the same electorate in a 28 May 1860 by-election. The by-election resulted from the resignation of Charles Brown, whose militia service required his full attention. King was the only candidate in the by-election, and was thus declared elected.

William Cutfield King and Thomas King (no relation) contested the Grey and Bell electorate in the 1860 election. On nomination day, the contestants addressed the electors and at the end of the meeting, the Returning Officer requested a show of hands, which was declared to be in favour of Thomas King. Consequently, W. C. King requested an election, which was held on Tuesday, 27 November 1860. W. C. King and T. King received 93 and 34 votes, respectively. Thus, his namesake was elected, but didn't attend Parliament, since he was killed in the First Taranaki War in February 1861 before the first session had started.

== Professional life ==
Upon arrival in New Zealand, King was originally a farmer and later became the manager of the Bank of New Zealand in New Plymouth for 16 years, from 1861 to 1878. He chaired the New Plymouth Harbour Board for many years until his death. He was the chairman of the New Plymouth Gas Company from its inception until his death.

== Death ==
King died at 4 am on 28 April 1893 at his residence in Dawson Street, New Plymouth. He was buried at Te Henui Cemetery.

He was survived by four sons, one daughter, and his wife. One of his sons, Truby King, was at the time of his death the Medical Superintendent of the Seacliff Lunatic Asylum. Truby's older brother Newton became a successful businessman in New Plymouth.

New Zealand Parliament
New constituency	Member of Parliament for Grey and Bell; 1853–55; 1860	Succeeded by Charles Brown
Preceded by John Lewthwaite	Member of Parliament for Grey and Bell; 1853–55; 1860	Succeeded by William Cutfield King
