= Herries Beattie =

Bookkeeper, journalist, historian, ethnologist, bookseller in New Zealand

James Herries Beattie MBE (6 June 1881 – 11 May 1972) was a New Zealand bookkeeper, journalist, historian, ethnologist and bookseller.

== Early life ==
James Herries Beattie (known as Herries) was the son of Scottish immigrants James Beattie and Mary Roden (Rodden) Thomson, who arrived in Otago in 1862 and were married in 1874. After some years of farming, James Beattie opened a drapery business in Gore, where he became a well-known figure and was mayor for four terms.

Beattie was born in Gore on 6 June 1881. He was one of nine children, four of whom died young. The family was deeply religious, Presbyterian at first and Congregational from 1892.

Alongside strong Protestant convictions, Beattie had a high regard for learning. He had wide interests in literature and natural history but was not gifted academically. After two years at Southland Boys' High School, Invercargill, he left in 1896 to work in the family business as a bookkeeper. This was less from choice than from filial duty, and the tedium of the job served only to further stimulate a powerful desire—present since childhood—to write.

== Early interest ==
His earliest interests had been in local wildlife, especially birds, but as a youth he tried his hand at poetry, short stories and historical novels. The latter reflected an intense curiosity about the history of Otago and Southland. From an early age Beattie had sought out surviving pioneers of European settlement. By the age of 11 he "was well and truly smitten with the history microbe" and had begun to keep notebooks recording the recollections of pioneer families around Gore and those of the surviving whalers and other old identities at Bluff and Riverton / Aparima, many of them descendants of marriages into the Māori community.

The content and style of Beattie's work can be traced to a number of early influences. His first attempt at a historical work was a biography of his uncle, William Adam of the Taieri Plain. As a young man, Adam had formed a strong acquaintance with Māori of the Henley area, from whom he gained a detailed knowledge of traditions and ways of life. Beattie had spent holidays at Otokia with his uncle, through whom he made his first contacts in the southern Otago Māori community, and began to develop a wide-ranging and lasting interest in the traditional lifestyle and history of Ngāi Tahu in southern New Zealand. Another important influence on his nascent career was the Southland pioneer W. H. Sherwood Roberts. He assisted Beattie's "chronicling apprenticeship" and provided a nucleus of information about the early southern runs and runholders around which Beattie constructed later publications. His interests in place names, and his style of writing about them, can also be traced to Roberts' Māori nomenclature.

Beattie was familiar with the archive-based regional histories of his time, such as Thomas Hocken's Contributions to the early history of New Zealand (Otago), and Robert McNab's Murihiku; but lacking academic training, and with opportunities for collecting first-hand accounts all about him, his writings were based upon interviews, buttressed with information from family notes, genealogies, and newspaper articles amongst more orthodox sources. From such material Beattie developed his own eclectic, anecdotal style. His first publication, in 1898, was a short history of Gore for the Southern Standard, but his earliest major work was a two-part history of early settlers, Pioneer recollections (1909, 1911). Next came his detailed account of southern Māori traditions, history and place names, based in part on Māori interviews, which was published in the Journal of the Polynesian Society between 1915 and 1922.

== Career ==
As this work began to bring him to the notice of professional ethnologists, Beattie sought ways of developing a career closer to his intellectual interests. He first attempted to become a schoolteacher, but failed the examination, then in 1916 he accepted a substantial drop in salary to become a journalist with the Mataura Ensign. By 1919 his publishing success, and the acceptance of papers for the Transactions and Proceedings of the New Zealand Institute, persuaded Harry Skinner at the Otago University Museum to fund a year-long ethnological survey of southern Māori communities. This was carried out in 1920, and it set the pattern for most of Beattie's subsequent work.

On a salary of £5 per week, Beattie travelled by train and bicycle to isolated Māori communities. He gave small presents out of courtesy but did not pay for interviews. As a young man he had relied on his memory to write up conversations, but now he prepared written questions in advance, beginning with sixty-five and ending up with about a thousand. These were worked through patiently with his informants, who were often 70 to 80 years old; the interviews sometimes took many days to complete. Beattie had a working knowledge of Māori, but no facility in speaking it, so his interviews were conducted in English, though usually with a younger member of the informant's family to translate as needed. His most important contacts were Hōne Taare Tīkao at Rāpaki and Eruete Kingi Kurupohatu at Kaka Point, but others who provided much of his information during more than 60 years of periodic fieldwork were Tiemi Haereroa Kupa, Erute Poko Cameron, Taare Reweti Te Maiharoa and Tuhituhi Te Marama.

In Old Waikouaiti he briefly interviewed Tame Wiremu Hipi, whose knowledge disappointed him, and his sister Mere Harper.

Beattie held the Māori elders in high regard (less so the younger generation), and he seems to have been received well on most occasions. Some clearly regarded him as offering the last chance to preserve substantial areas of traditional knowledge that they thought were not properly appreciated by their descendants. His survey in 1920 was incomplete, however, because he gained little from people who had lived at Otakou and Kaiapoi and he lacked the time and resources to go far beyond Christchurch from his base at Weston, near Oamaru. He also obtained only limited material on Westland and districts to the north. Nevertheless, the 1920 ethnological project was the major achievement of his career. It produced more than 1,000 closely written pages of information; failing to get this published at the time, Beattie mined it extensively for his subsequent books. It was published in 1994 as Traditional lifeways of the southern Māori.

=== Research ===
In 1921 Beattie was employed as librarian and ethnologist at the New Plymouth Public Library. He had married Mary McKenzie at Gore on 25 May 1910, and concerns about his wife's health brought him south again, to purchase a bookshop in Waimate. He ran that business until 1939, the earliest he could get an acceptable price for it after the depression, but remained in Waimate and, at the age of 59, was finally able to devote himself fully to writing and publication. Besides smaller works and pamphlets aimed at the tourist market, Beattie produced many works of lasting importance. By the end of his career his prolific writing had produced 27 books, of which 12 were on the Pākehā pioneers and 10 on Māori. These included Tikao talks (1939), Māori lore of lake, alp and fiord (1945), and Our southernmost Māoris (1954). The remaining five were on scenic and tourist attractions.

== Assessment and recognition ==
These works reveal the strengths and weaknesses of Beattie's approach. He systematically interviewed Māori elders and Pākehā pioneers, and constructed from their recollections detailed accounts of history and ways of life that greatly amplify, and occasionally challenge, other accounts. Yet, in the case of Māori especially, it is not always obvious to which informant material should be attributed, and his original notebooks were not preserved. Beattie used the widest range of material and showed explicitly how his arguments and conclusions were revised as new evidence came to hand, but he did not discriminate between sources of varying quality. His major works retain the scrapbook nature of their origins and are written in a colloquial style. In their time, they were regarded with suspicion by academic historians and anthropologists who preferred the more conventional publications on Māori by Elsdon Best, and this served to reinforce a perception of northern Māori traditions and customs as the New Zealand standard.

With the recent acceptance attained by oral history and a resurgence of interest in the distinctiveness of southern Māori, Beattie's research has achieved a more general esteem. In his collection of original material from oral sources in the South Island, he can be compared with Edward Shortland and Walter Mantell, but otherwise has no peer.

=== Awards and honours ===
In 1941 Beattie was awarded the Percy Smith Medal by the University of Otago for his achievements in anthropology. In the 1967 Queen’s Birthday Honours was made a Member of the Order of the British Empire for services to historical research in New Zealand.

Beattie's personal papers and records were donated to the Hocken Collections of the University of Otago. In 2018, these papers were added to the UNESCO Memory of the World Aotearoa New Zealand Ngā Mahara o te Ao register.

== Personal life and death ==
Beattie, who served 40 years as a Sunday school teacher, later joined the Open Brethren.

Beattie died at Timaru on 11 May 1972. Mary Beattie had died in 1944, and a son also predeceased him. He was survived by three daughters.

== Publications ==
- The Māoris and Fiordland : Māori myths, fascinating fables, legendary lore, typical traditions and native nomenclature / by Herries Beattie
- Herries Beattie (2006). Otago Place Names: Names Bestowed by European Explorers and Settlers in Otago and Southland. Christchurch: Cadsonbury Publications. ISBN 1-877151-59-9. Wikidata Q106913704.
