= Victoria May, Baroness Plunket =

Canadian nursing association founder (1873–1968)

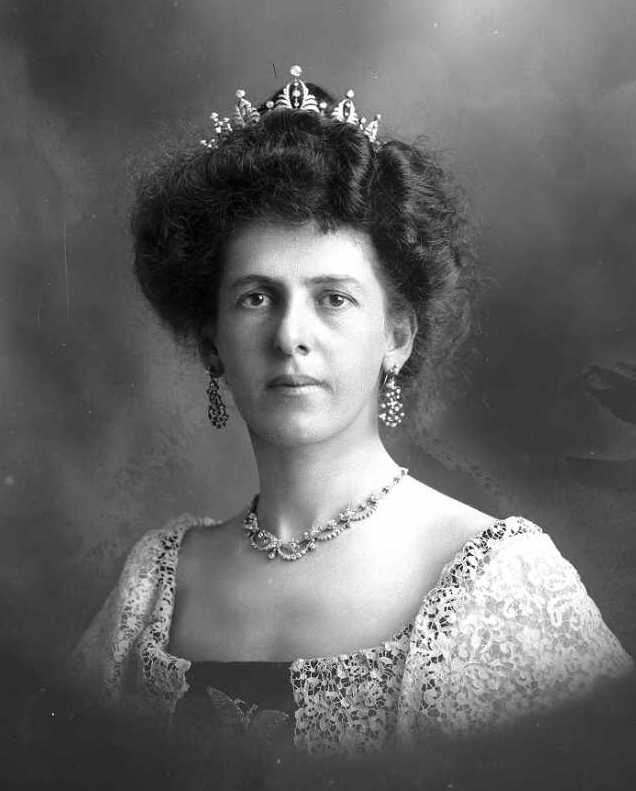
- c. 1905
- Born: 17 May 1873
- Died: 11 February 1968 (aged 94)
- Spouse: William Plunket, 5th Baron Plunket

Victoria Alexandrina Muriel May, Baroness Plunket (17 May 1873 – 11 February 1968) was a nursing association founder and vicereine.

After marrying William Lee Plunket, she moved to New Zealand and later the UK. Influenced by the health reformer Truby King, she gave her name to and was a patron of the Plunket Society founded by King in New Zealand, offering free health services to mothers and children. She was also a patron of the Mothercraft Training Society.

== Early life ==
Victoria Alexandrina Hamilton-Temple-Blackwood was born in Ottawa, Canada, on 17 May 1873. She was the youngest daughter and second-youngest child of Frederick Hamilton-Temple-Blackwood. Her parents were part of the Anglo-Irish Protestant Ascendancy.

Her older sister, Helen, was involved in nursing and nurses' rights as well as her other older sister, Hermione.

She was baptised in Quebec and named after her godmother, Queen Victoria. Her godfather was John A. Macdonald, the first Prime Minister of Canada. Aged 5, she travelled to Ireland with her family.

Blackwood arrived in New Zealand in 1904 but went back to the United Kingdom with her husband in 1910.

== Marriage ==
At 18, when in Italy, Victoria met William Lee Plunket, 26. They married three years later in Paris. They had 8 children.

Following her husband's death, she married Francis Powell Braithwaite on 1 October 1920.

== Work ==
Victoria gave her name to the Plunket Society, a New Zealand society promoting the health and well-being of mothers and children, after meeting Truby King, whose work she admired. She came up with an idea of a special guild of district nurses who promoted good diet and nutrition, hygiene, fresh air and breastfeeding (or 'humanised' milk, if breastfeeding was impossible) for babies. These services were to be free to all mothers.

She was a patron of the Mothercraft Training Society.

== Death ==
Lady Victoria Braithwaite (as she was then styled) died on 11 February 1968 at the Penywern Nursing Home, London.
