= Royal Over-Seas League =

Non-profit members' organisation

Coordinates: 51°30′22″N 0°8′27″W

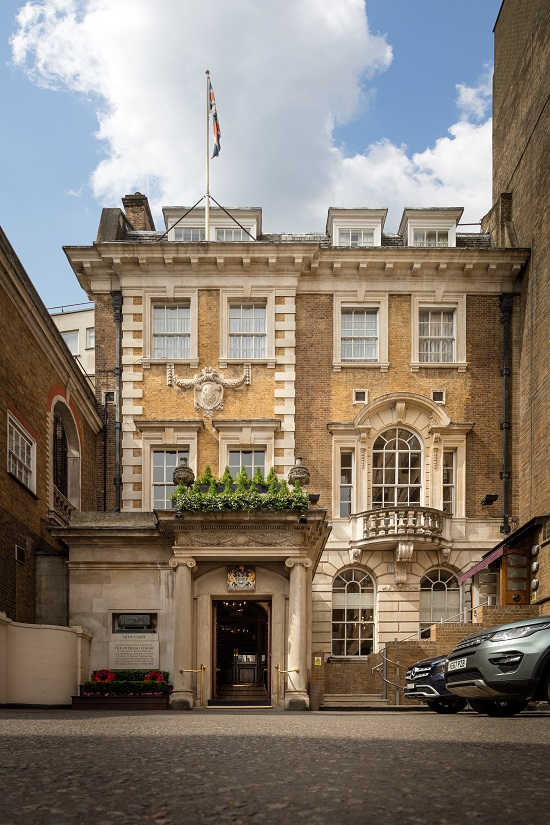
- Front view of Over-Seas House
- Abbreviation: ROSL
- Established: 1910; 116 years ago
- Founder: Sir Evelyn Wrench
- Type: Non-profit members' organisation
- Legal status: Incorporated by Royal Charter
- Purpose: The support of international understanding and friendship through social and artistic activities.
- Headquarters: Over-Seas House, Park Place, London, SW1 (since 1922)
- Patron: King Charles III
- Vice-Patron: Sir Timothy Laurence
- President: Lord Geidt
- Chairman: Helen Prince
- Key people: Director General, Annette Prandzioch
- Website: rosl.org.uk

The Royal Over-Seas League (ROSL) is a not-for-profit institution founded in 1910, with the aim of promoting international friendship under its royal charter.

ROSL has a Grade I listed clubhouse in St James's, London, and a programme of events including a public affairs series which focuses on geopolitical issues, concerts, art exhibitions, and food and wine events.

The clubhouse includes a dining room, more than 80 bedrooms, events spaces and a garden overlooking Green Park used for al fresco dining in the summer.

ROSL promotes young musicians and visual artists through an arts programme, including the Annual Music Competition, which is more than 70 years old. In 2021, the organisation introduced the Public Affairs Series and Annual Lecture, a series of events and debates featuring journalists and broadcasters, ambassadors and politicians.

The ROSL Foundation, its associated charity, supports music, arts and heritage.

== Leadership ==
ROSL's patron is King Charles III. The vice-patron is Sir Timothy Laurence, and the president is Lord Geidt. The director general since 2020 is Annette Prandzioch, and its chairman is Helen Prince.

== Facilities and activities ==
The clubhouse has 83 bedrooms, many with views across the Royal Park or across the skyline of Westminster.

The art deco dining-room was refurbished in 2022. It has a chef team and collaborations with celebrity chefs Irini Tzortzoglou, Cyrus Todiwala and Daren Liew.

ROSL publishes a quarterly journal called Overseas, which comprises contemporary features written by journalists, members' articles and information about forthcoming events and the arts programme.

Membership allows access to various events, including the Public Affairs Series and Annual Lecture, which feature speakers discussing geopolitical issues. Recent speakers include Michael Gove, Rt Hon. Lord William Hague of Richmond, Former Prime Minister of Australia Julia Gillard, Scott Morrison, Sir John Sawers, Lord Roberts of Belgravia, Lord Frost, Baroness Ashton of Upholland, and Lord Robertson.

ROSL has connections with musicians such as Joseph Calleja.

== Membership ==
The ROSL has 11,000 members worldwide. Membership fees are based on proximity to the London clubhouse, or age, with those aged 17 to 25 paying a reduced membership rate. Applicants for membership require a proposer.

== Annual Music Competition ==
ROSL organises a worldwide annual competition for musicians aged 30 and under. There are four solo section awards and two ensemble awards; the solo section winners then compete for the competition gold medal and first prize. Past winners include Jacqueline du Pré, Melvyn Tan, Piers Lane, Jonathan Lemalu, Sean Shibe and the Marmen Quartet.

ROSL offers performance opportunities to prize-winners at venues such as Wigmore Hall. The organisation has established relationships with many UK festivals and promoters including Brighton, Buxton, Cambridge Summer Music, and North Norfolk.

ROSL organises a series of chamber music concerts at the Edinburgh Fringe Festival.

These programmes provide mentorship, advice, networking, promotional support and concert opportunities for young musicians.

== ROSL Foundation ==
The ROSL Foundation (Charity no. 306095) was established on 1 January 1960 to mark the ROSL's Golden Jubilee.

Alexander Downer is the chairman of trustees.

== Arms ==
Coat of arms of Royal Over-Seas League

Notes
Granted 7 January 1960.
Crest
On a wreath Argent Gules and Azure two hands that to the dexter Sable and that to the sinister carnation supporting a terrestrial globe the sea Or the land Gules.
Escutcheon
In a shield a representation of a seascape thereon an ancient ship in full sail flying a pennon and flags of St. George all within a bordure of clouds Proper.
Supporters
On the dexter side a winged sea-unicorn Argent armed crined finned and the wings Or and on the sinister side a winged sea-lion also Argent maned finned and the wings Gold.

== See also ==
- List of London's gentlemen's clubs
- English-Speaking Union
- Evelyn Wrench
- Rutland House
