= William Plunket, 5th Baron Plunket =

British diplomat and administrator

The Right Honourable The Lord Plunket GCMG GCVO KBE KStJ DL
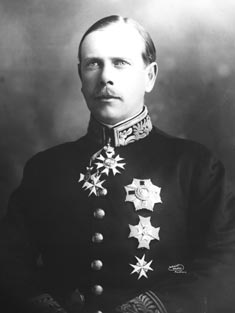
- The 5th Baron Plunket

14th Governor of New Zealand
- In office 20 June 1904 – 8 June 1910
- Monarchs: Edward VII; George V
- Prime Minister: Richard Seddon; William Hall-Jones; Joseph Ward
- Preceded by: The Earl of Ranfurly
- Succeeded by: The Lord Islington

Personal details
- Born: 19 December 1864 Dublin, Ireland
- Died: 24 January 1920 (aged 55) London, England
- Spouse: Lady Victoria Hamilton-Temple-Blackwood (m. 1894)
- Parent(s): William Plunket, 4th Baron Plunket; Anne Lee Guinness
- Education: Harrow School; Trinity College, Dublin

William Lee Plunket, 5th Baron Plunket, GCMG, GCVO, KBE, KStJ, DL (19 December 1864 – 24 January 1920) was a British diplomat and colonial administrator. He was Governor of New Zealand from 1904 to 1910.

== Early life ==
Born in Dublin, he was educated at Harrow and Trinity College Dublin. His parents were Rev. William Plunket, 4th Baron Plunket, Archbishop of Dublin in 1884–97, and his wife Anne Lee Guinness, the daughter of Sir Benjamin Lee Guinness.

He entered the Diplomatic Service and was sent to Rome in 1889 as an attaché to the British Embassy there. In 1892, he was appointed in the same position to the embassy in Constantinople, and finally retired two years later.

== Career ==
Having succeeded his father as fifth Baron Plunket in 1897, Plunket three years later became private secretary to Lord Cadogan, Lord Lieutenant of Ireland at the time, and fulfilled the same role for his successor Lord Dudley, when he was appointed to the position in August 1902. He was appointed CVO and KCVO in 1900 and 1903 respectively, and in 1904 he became Governor of New Zealand as well as a KCMG the following year. By chance, the Speaker of the New Zealand House of Representatives at the time was his second cousin Arthur Guinness. He held this post until 1910, when he was advanced to GCMG. In 1907 he presented the Plunket Shield, which is still contested each year by the major cricket teams in New Zealand. He was later appointed KBE in 1918.

=== Freemasonry ===
Plunket was a Freemason. During his term as Governor of New Zealand (1906–1909), he was also Grand Master of New Zealand's Grand Lodge.

== Death ==
Lord Plunket died on 24 January 1920 aged 55 at 40 Elvaston Place, South Kensington, London, and was buried in the city's Putney Vale Cemetery.

== Family ==
Plunket married, in 1894, Lady Victoria Alexandrina Hamilton-Temple-Blackwood, youngest daughter of the 1st Marquess of Dufferin and Ava, with whom he had eight children. Victoria gave her name to the Plunket Society, a New Zealand society promoting the health and well-being of mothers and children and was a patron of the Mothercraft Training Society.

Coat of arms of William Plunket, 5th Baron Plunket
Crest A horse passant Argent charged on the shoulder with a portcullis. Escutcheon Sable a bend a castle in chief and a portcullis in base Argent. Supporters Dexter an antelope Proper sinister a horse Argent both charged on the shoulder with a portcullis Sable. Motto Festina Lente

Government offices
Preceded by The Earl of Ranfurly	Governor of New Zealand; 1904–1910	Succeeded by The Lord Islington
Peerage of the United Kingdom
Preceded by William Conyngham Plunket	Baron Plunket; 1897–1920	Succeeded by Terence Conyngham Plunket
