= Plunket Society =

New Zealand children's organisation

- Formation: 14 May 1907; 119 years ago
- Type: Charitable trust
- Website: Official website

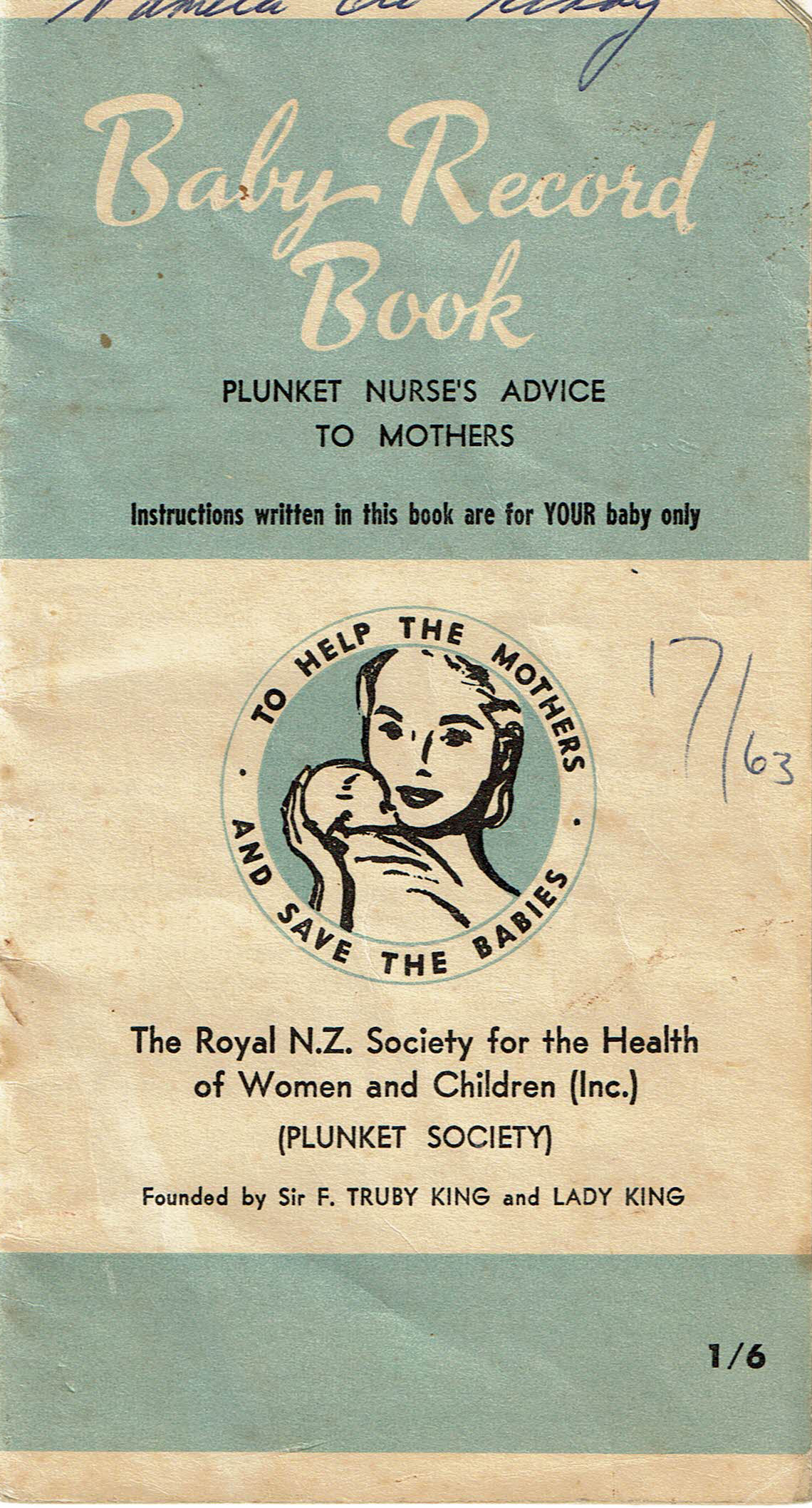
1960s booklet given to parents by Plunket, to record baby's health and progress

The Royal New Zealand Plunket Trust provides a range of free services aimed at improving the development, health and wellbeing of children under the age of five within New Zealand, where it is commonly known simply as Plunket. Its mission is "to ensure that New Zealand children are among the healthiest in the world". Much of Plunket's work is organised by volunteers.

It was an incorporated society named the Royal New Zealand Plunket Society until 1 January 2018, when it became a charitable trust under the Charitable Trusts Act 1957.

== History ==
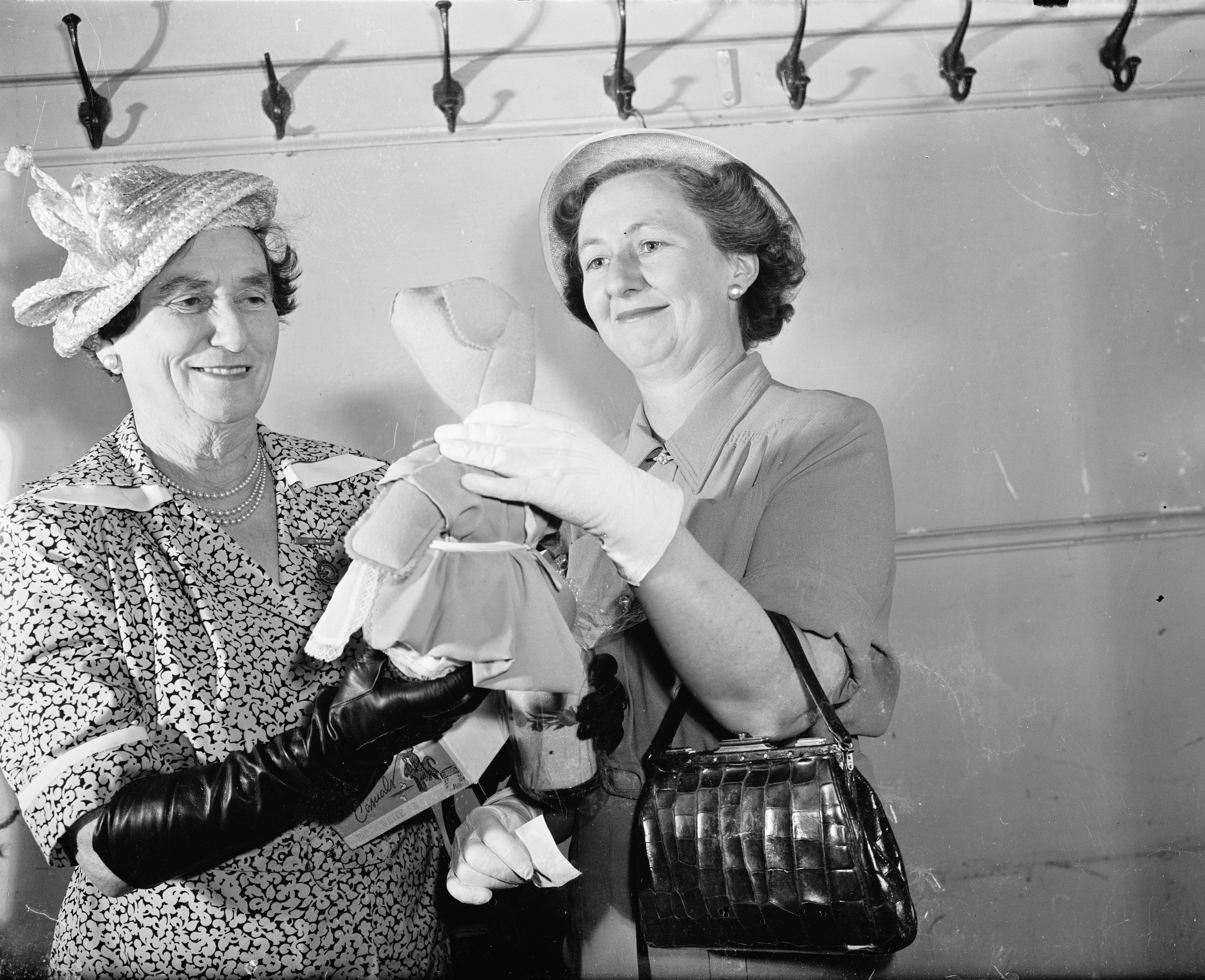
MP Hilda Ross (left) and Mrs Gilmer, president of the Plunket Society, at the opening of the 1950 Karitane Fair, Wellington

In 1905 Plunket had its beginnings in Seacliff, a small village on the Coast Road north of Dunedin. Truby King, then superintendent of Seacliff Asylum, began studying paediatrics and child welfare when his adopted baby daughter Mary was making no progress. He devised a milk-based formula which led her to thrive. He formed the belief that by providing support services to parents, the society could ensure children were fed on a nutritious diet, reducing child mortality rates. He also believed that this would improve adult health as the children got older.

King subsequently trained Joanna McKinnon in his methods of baby care and she went out into the Seacliff community to support local mothers. Towards the end of 1905 McKinnon moved to Dunedin to spread the word. By the end of three months she had 50 babies under her daily care. Help was needed and King recruited and trained nurse O'Shea to assist her. Demand for their services continued to grow and by the end of 1906 they were stretched to the limit. All expenses for this undertaking, including training and salaries for the two nurses were paid for by King.

At the same time in 1906, two respected Kāi Tahu and Kāti Huirapa midwives and healers, Mere Harper and Ria Tikini, delivered Thomas Rangiwahia Mutu Ellison. His older brother had died as a baby, so when Thomas also became ill the midwives brought him to Mere's friend Truby King. Thomas thrived under their combined care, and the Karitāne Home for Babies opened within a year. Although these women were "integral to Plunket's establishment", they were not included in the histories of Plunket published in 1982 and 2007, which the organisation rectified in 2020.

King held the meeting which led to the founding of the society on 14 May 1907, in Dunedin, with the motivation to 'help the mothers and save the babies'. A committee was formed, made up mostly of those people who had supported and helped McKinnon during the past two years. King also used the extensive networks established by Mere Harper and Ria Tikini, as well as their decades of experience and the traditional knowledge they held, to develop the society.

Lady Victoria Plunket, mother of eight and wife of then Governor of New Zealand, William Plunket, 5th Baron Plunket, had met King in 1905, and became a patron soon after the society's foundation. Hers was the idea to train nurses and create a professional nursing service. She travelled around New Zealand even while herself five months pregnant to gather support and encourage the formation of branches. Nine were formed by the time she returned to England in 1910. Her vision was to link these branches in one organisation based in Dunedin which would hold an annual conference. Centres in Auckland, Wellington and Christchurch were used both for the babies that were failing to flourish, and for training camps for the nurses.

At the society's first annual conference, it adopted the name the Society for the Health of Women and Children. In 1914, it officially became the Plunket Society in recognition of its patron. The society gained royal recognition and the prefix Royal in 1915.

In 1912, King made a lecture tour on the Plunket Society. In these tours he was highly successful in attracting support for the society, partly because he exaggerated the effect on infant mortality rates. As a result of his tour, 60 new centres opened around New Zealand, each employing a nurse. The centres were badged as Plunket Rooms, however they are now referred to as Plunket Clinics. King published several manuals, among them Feeding and Care of Baby (1913), and The Expectant Mother and Baby's First Months (1916). This latter publication was given to every applicant for a marriage licence.

Mothers were even given practices to inform them of domestic hygiene and mothercraft that were based on King's ideology. They included the regularity of feeding, eating and bowel habits. In New Zealand the Plunket philosophy became 'parenting lore' and within three decades New Zealand had the lowest infant mortality rate in the world.

However the society laboured for many years under the false perception that it was set up to cater only for European women and their babies; this impression was reinforced by the fact that the Department of Health operated a Native Health Nurse Service specifically for Māori in rural areas.

== Plunket today ==
Many changes and modifications have been made to Plunket teaching and organisation over the years. The initial strict parenting regimes and routines have given way to more flexible care and support, and Karitane Hospitals were replaced in the 1970s with Plunket Karitane family centres. In 1981, a car seat rental scheme was introduced, and in 1994, a telephone advice service, PlunketLine, was established. Special training schemes have been initiated for Māori Health Workers to give culturally appropriate guidance where necessary, and Plunket is also seeing an increase in the number of Pacific Island families enrolling.

Today, there are hundreds of centres across New Zealand.

In 2020, Plunket rebranded its logo to better acknowledge its founding Māori midwives Mere Harper and Ria Tikini, and to indicate its desire to better meet the needs of Māori communities and other tribes.
