= Shirtcliffe =

Shirtcliffe is a surname. Notable people with the surname include:

- George Shirtcliffe (1862–1941), New Zealand businessman and politician
- Peter Shirtcliffe (born 1931), New Zealand businessman
