= Janet Hesketh =

New Zealand women's leader

Janet Hesketh CNZM QSM
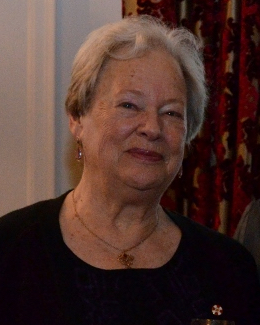
- Hesketh in 2013

President of the National Council of Women of New Zealand
- In office 1994–1998
- Preceded by: Alison Roxburgh
- Succeeded by: Barbara Glenie

Personal details
- Born: 23 December 1934 Hamilton, New Zealand
- Died: 29 August 2018 (aged 83) Wellington, New Zealand
- Spouse: Clive Hesketh (m. 1957, divorced)
- Children: 4
- Education: Victoria University College

Janet May Hesketh CNZM QSM (née Mackenzie; 23 December 1934 – 29 August 2018) was a New Zealand women's leader. She served as president of the National Council of Women of New Zealand (NCWNZ) between 1994 and 1998.

== Early life and education ==
Hesketh was born Janet May Mackenzie on 23 December 1934 in Hamilton, to Lilian May Harris and electrical engineer Eric Bruce Mackenzie. She attended primary school in Nelson, and then attended Wellington East Girls' College after the family moved to Wellington in 1946. Mackenzie graduated from Victoria University College in 1955 with a Bachelor of Science degree in geography. She worked as a geography demonstrator and began studying for a master's degree. She also taught at Otago Girls' High School for a year.

Mackenzie married dentist Clive Hesketh on 21 December 1957, and they had four children together. She did not finish her master's degree, passing her work on to others to finish when she had her first child.

== Work ==
Hesketh's husband did not want his wife to work, although she assisted in administration for his dental practice. Through her children's activities, Hesketh became involved in time-keeping and judging for water polo and swimming, and in the Mothers' Union (now the Association of Anglican Women) and Girl Guides.

Hesketh attended the Wellington branch meetings of NCWNZ as the representative of the Association of Anglican Women. In 1981, she became convenor of the NCWNZ Parliamentary Watch Committee, and in 1984 she was elected national secretary of NCWNZ, a position she held for four years. She was elected vice-president in 1988, and was president from 1994 to 1998, following on from Alison Roxburgh. Hesketh said later that she was expected by her family to be at home, and would not have been president of NCWNZ without having earlier separated from her husband. Hesketh attended the 1995 Beijing Conference on Women on NCWNZ's behalf. Hesketh was concerned about women's reproductive rights, violence against women and matrimonial and de facto property law.

== Later life ==
Between 1995 and 2001, Hesketh served on the Legal Services Board. She died at her home in Wellington on 29 August 2018, aged 83.

== Honours and awards ==
In the 1988 Queen's Birthday Honours, Hesketh was awarded the Queen's Service Medal for public services. In the 1996 Queen's Birthday Honours, she was appointed a Companion of the New Zealand Order of Merit, for services to the National Council of Women.
