= Niuean mythology =

Mythology of Niue

Niuean mythology relates to some of the myths prevalent on the island of Niue, an Oceanic island country in free association with New Zealand. Although Niuean mythology reports a colonization before 500 AD, the island was settled by Polynesians from Samoa around 900 AD. The five principal gods of Niue are known as the tupua (principle gods of Niue), and include Fao, Huanaki, Fakahoko, Laga-iki, and Lagi-atea, who by various accounts, arrived from Fonuagalo (the lost country), Tulia, Toga-liulu, or perhaps other islands. In Avatele myths, the gods are said to have come from within the earth instead of Fonuagalo. There are also many other gods in Niuean mythology from fish gods to flying rats.

== Background ==
According to Peniamina, a Pacific Island missionary stationed on the island, the islanders consider Huanaki and Fao as their ancestors. They believe that Huanaki and Fao were the first to locate the island which had slightly surfaced above the ground with the sea striking its shores. As they landed on the island, they brought down their feet in a forcible action upon the island surface twice; at the first stomping, the water (tides) receded, resulting in emergence of land, and with the second stomping, greenery in the form of grass, trees and other vegetation was created. The Nui myths of the Pacific islands have been interpreted as a result of two coseismic-uplift events that had occurred at the island in the past 2,000 years, akin to a similar situation prevalent in several areas of the southwest and west Pacific Islands. The uplift produced by earthquakes could be the reason for relating them to the stomping myths of Niue and also from Tonga.

== Deities ==
The five tupua (principle gods of Niue) are Fao, Fakahoko, Huanaki, Laga-iki, and Lagi-atea. According to myth the first to set foot on the island was Fao, followed by Huanaki. It is also said that Fao was one of the five principal gods of Niue (tupua), said to have arrived on Niue beneath a pool on the reef near the base of the cliffs, and to have then "ascended to build a residence at Toga-liulu". Fakahoko is a war god and one of the five major gods of the island. Lagi-atea is one of the five principal gods of Niue, and is said to have caused death in the universe. Lagihalulu forebodes ill luck. Lage-iki is another of the five major gods of the islanders; he has many children and is said to reside in the western region of the island; he is the cause of death in the world.

Many other gods and goddesses are mentioned in Niuean mythology:

- Atelapa – the god of the kale (Porphyrio bird).
- Fakakonaatua – represents meteors and thunder, and is worshiped before battle to poison the gods of the enemy.
- Fakapaete – a god who protects against attack by stones.
- Halapouli – a god who is said to be invoked when throwing a spear.
- Halevao – the god of the peka (flying fox). According to legend, Halevao and Tamalafafa the pigeon came from a grave to "fly along the way of Nuku-tapa and Oloolo, which is a burnt forest; and they descended to the cliffs and the top of the cliffs on the coast".
- Haliua – the god of the uga (crab).
- Hokohoko – goddess of Niue.
- Lagiofa – a god recalled during war.
- Lagitaitaia – a god of fish with stripes on its body who is said to quiet the sea following a storm.
- Lata – a wise god of benevolence.
- Liavaha – a fish god who after a sea storm quiets the sea.
- Luatotolo – a god who can force all other gods to the seabed.
- Luatupua – one of the major gods on the southern region of the island who is also capable of forcing other gods to the bottom of the sea.
- Lageikiua, Lagihulugia and Lagiloa are other gods of the island.
- Makapoelagi – the god of the sky.
- Makapoe-Lagi is one of the major gods of the eastern part of the island.
- Tafehemoana – a powerful sea god.
- Tagaloa-fofoa, Tagaloa-lahi, Tagaloa-motumotu, Tagaloa-uluulu are Niue goddesses.
- Tamalafafa – the god of the pigeon.
- Tihatala – the god of the tuaki (tropical bird)
- Tilalofonua – the god of the kuma (rat) and bird of the heavens. According to myth, Tilalofonua was said to have begged Halevao for some wings, but to no avail. He prayed for a long time and was eventually granted them by Halevao after demonstrating his love.
- Tolioatua – the Hunger god and god of thieves.

== Bibliography ==
- Craig, Robert D. (1 January 1989). Dictionary of Polynesian Mythology. Greenwood Publishing Group. ISBN 978-0-313-25890-9.
- Loeb, Edwin Meyer (1926). History and Traditions of Niue. Vol. 32. The Museum.
- Smith, S; Pulekulu (1993) [1901]. "Niue The Island And Its People". Journal of the Polynesian Society: 97–. GGKEY:1ZG5T864FZB.
