= Fakahoko =

God in Niuean mythology

In Niuean mythology, Fakahoko is one of the gods of the island. He is cited as one of the five original gods (tupua) of the island who fled from the lost country of Fonuagalo.

A story told is that Fao, along with Laga-iki, Fakahoko, Huanaki, and Lagi-atea, left the lost country (Fonuagalo), because they felt they had not been properly recognized at feasts. When they arrived in Niue, Fao was only able to place one of his feet on the ground. Huanaki completed Fao's work and the other three gods came to settle on the island. Another version of the story is that these five gods were lazy and did no work toward preparing feasts. When their parents had prepared a feast, they received no portion of it because they had done nothing to help in its preparation. When they continued to do nothing in preparing feasts, their parents continued withholding any portion of it from them. The five gods then searched for an island where they could live away from their parents.
