= Janet Holm =

New Zealand environmental activist and historian

Janet Rutherford Holm MBE (née Morse, 12 August 1923 – 14 July 2018) was a New Zealand environmental activist and historian.

== Biography ==
Holm was born in Christchurch, New Zealand, in 1923 and grew up on a farm near Waiau in North Canterbury. She attended Rangi Ruru Girls' School in Christchurch and studied English and philosophy at Canterbury University College, and Victoria University College in Wellington.

=== Environmental work ===
In 1966, Holm moved back to Christchurch and decided to take action against the city's ongoing problems with smog in the winters. She joined the Clean Air Society and served as secretary and president. The society was successful in having the city recognise the role of open fires in homes in the production of smog, and as a result the city passed an open-fire ban. She also worked with the Clean Air Council, the New Zealand Association for Environmental Education, the International Union for Conservation of Nature, and Action on Smoking and Health. In 1972, Holm was a representative to the United Nations Conference on the Human Environment in Stockholm, Sweden.

In the 1988 Queen's Birthday Honours, Holm was appointed a Member of the Order of the British Empire, for services to the environmental movement. In 2004, she received the Outstanding Contribution Award from Environment Canterbury for her work for clean air and environmental education in the Canterbury Region.

In 1979, in collaboration with Julie Fitness, Jean Shalders and the Canterbury Environmental Centre, she helped publish a 27-page booklet about air pollution, covering such topics as where pollutants come from, what harm pollutants do and why Christchurch was, at that time, the air pollution capital of New Zealand. The booklet was republished in 1989 with assistance from a New Zealand Environmental Grant and Epicentre. The Environment and Peace Centre (Epicentre) was a collective of committed to preservation of the environment and working for peace.

==== Controversy ====
The open fire ban and later phrase out of solid-fuel burners was, and still is, controversial. Opponents argue that burning wood and coal is less costly and more self-sufficient than cleaner home heating options.

The city of Christchurch is prone to air pollution in the winter for a combination of reasons. In winter, when a high pressure system settles over the South Island, it brings cold temperatures and light winds. Locally, air flow is restricted by the terrain and a strong temperature inversion forms. The residents feel the cold. Their response is to fire up their home heating. For many, this means a wood or coal burning fire. With little wind to disperse the coarse particles emitted from home fires, smog builds up under the inversion layer. In summer, it's windier and winds tend to blow pollution away.

In 1997, there were approximately 15,500 open fires, 3,500 closed coal burners and 31,000 wood burners in the city. In the 1990s the number of high pollution nights per year averaged 30; in 1999 it peaked at 60; in 2018 there were 3.

=== Historical work ===
In the 1980s, Holm returned to the University of Canterbury to complete a master's degree in history; she wrote her thesis on her grandfather George and his six siblings, and later published the research as a book, Nothing but Grass and Wind. She was also a keen genealogist and travelled the country visiting cemeteries and photographing headstones. The Canterbury History Foundation awarded Holm the 2005 A. C. Rhodes Memorial Award in recognition of this work. In the same year, she published her book on the lives of early surveyors, and became the first woman appointed an honorary member of the New Zealand Institute of Surveyors.

=== Publications ===
- Air Pollution. Christchurch: Epicentre, 1989.
- Nothing but Grass and Wind: The Rutherfords of Canterbury. Christchurch: Hazard Press, 1992.
- De Steiguer, Jacqueline; Holm, Janet (2000). Experience in environmental action. Canterbury Environment Centre.
- Caught Mapping: The Life and Times of New Zealand's Early Surveyors. Christchurch: Hazard Press, 2005.
- On Zealand's Hills, Where Tigers Steal Along. Wellington: Steele Roberts, 2008.

== Legacy ==
Following Holm's death in 2018, her family established the Janet Holm Prize in History in her memory at the University of Canterbury. The inaugural award of the prize was made in December 2018.
