= 1936 New Year Honours (New Zealand) =

Annual awards for New Zealanders

The 1936 New Year Honours in New Zealand were appointments by King George V to various orders and honours to reward and highlight good works by New Zealanders. The awards celebrated the passing of 1935 and the beginning of 1936, and were announced on 1 January 1936.

The recipients of honours are displayed here as they were styled before their new honour.

== Knight Bachelor ==
- James Hutchison – of Dunedin. For public services.
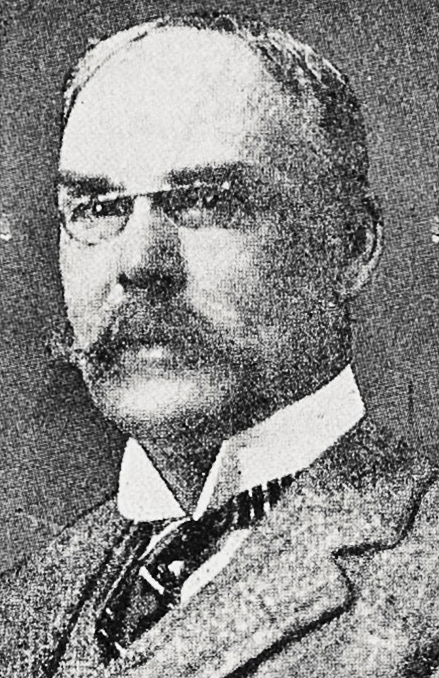
Sir James Hutchison

== Order of Saint Michael and Saint George ==
=== Companion (CMG) ===
- Willi Fels – of Dunedin. For services to ethnology.
- Cecil Albert Jeffery – of Wellington; clerk of the Executive Council and secretary to the Cabinet.
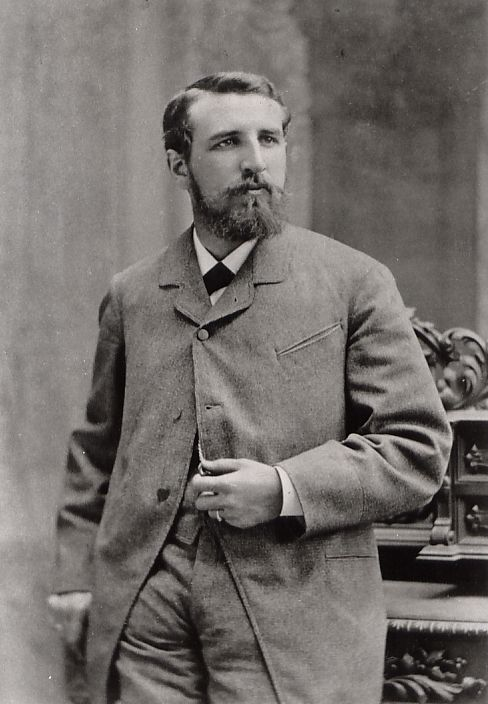
Willi Fels

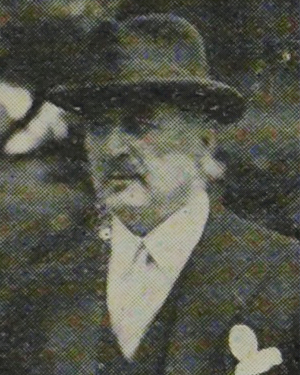
Cecil Jeffery

== Order of the British Empire ==
=== Knight Commander (KBE) ===
Civil division

- George Shirtcliffe OBE – of Wellington. For public services.
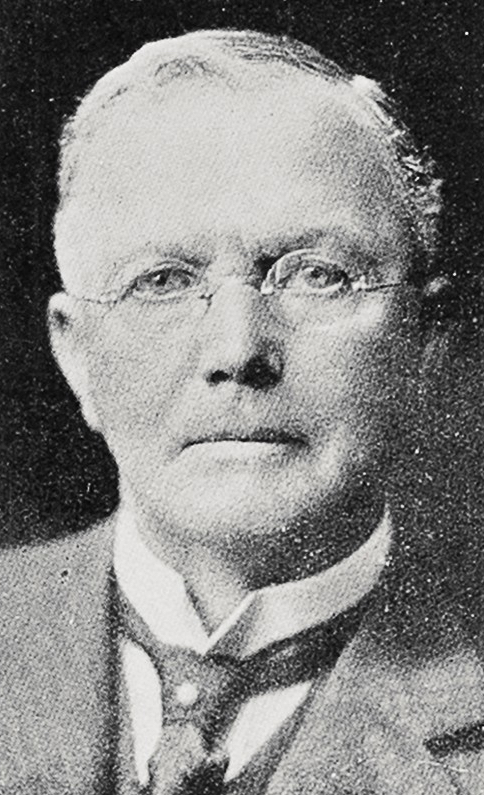
Sir George Shirtcliffe

=== Commander (CBE) ===
Civil division

- Charles John McKenzie – of Wellington; engineer-in-chief and under-secretary, Public Works Department.

=== Officer (OBE) ===
Civil division

- Maude Elizabeth Parkes – of Auckland. For social and philanthropic services.
- Ann Gilchrist Strong – of Dunedin; dean of the Home Science Department, University of Otago.
