= William Skinner (ethnographer) =

New Zealand surveyor, historian, and ethnographer (1857–1946)

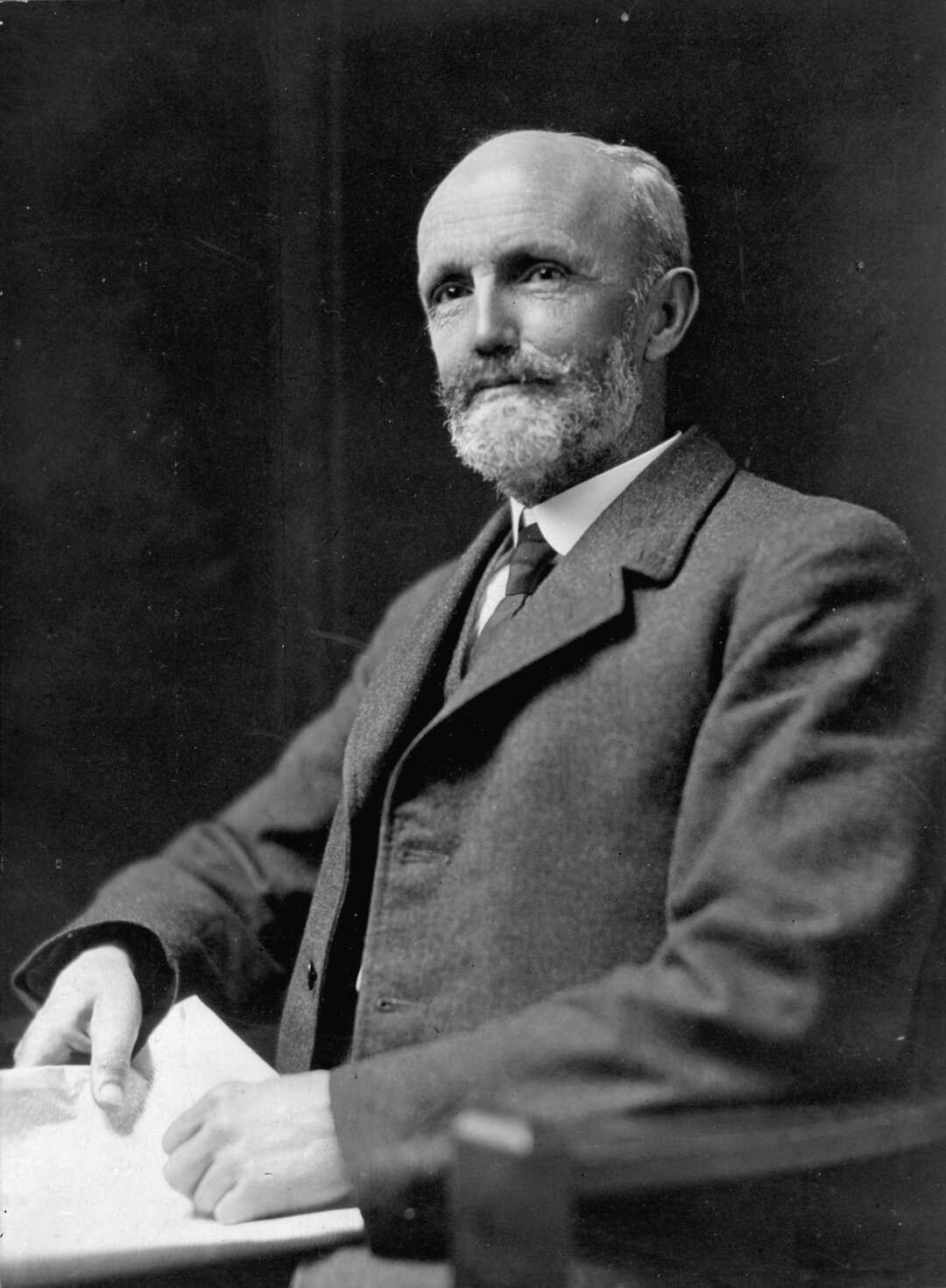
- Skinner in c. 1917
- Born: William Henry Skinner; 26 February 1857; New Plymouth
- Died: 24 October 1946 (aged 89); New Plymouth
- Other names: W. H. Skinner
- Occupations: surveyor, historian, ethnographer
- Known for: co-founder of Polynesian Society founder of Puke Ariki

William Henry Skinner (26 February 1857 – 24 October 1946) was a New Zealand surveyor, historian, and ethnographer.

== Early life ==
Born in New Plymouth in 1857, Skinner was the son of immigrants who had arrived in the town from Devon in 1841. His father, Thomas Kingwell Skinner, was a butcher and could afford to pay for a private education at local schools.

== Survey career ==
In mid-1872, Skinner started a survey cadetship with Thomas Humphries, the chief surveyor of Taranaki Province, and rose to the position of assistant surveyor by 1876. Much of his survey work in Taranaki was considered dangerous, with tensions from the New Zealand Wars over land ongoing. Skinner laid out Inglewood and Mokau. Due to the harsh conditions in the field, Skinner's health suffered and from 1888, his work changed to office tasks. Quickly promoted through various ranks, from 1911 onwards he worked outside of Taranki. He was commissioner of Crown lands and chief surveyor for Marlborough, then Hawke's Bay, and then Canterbury after which he retired to New Plymouth in 1919. He reflected on his experiences as a surveyor in a book published in 1946.

== Other activities ==
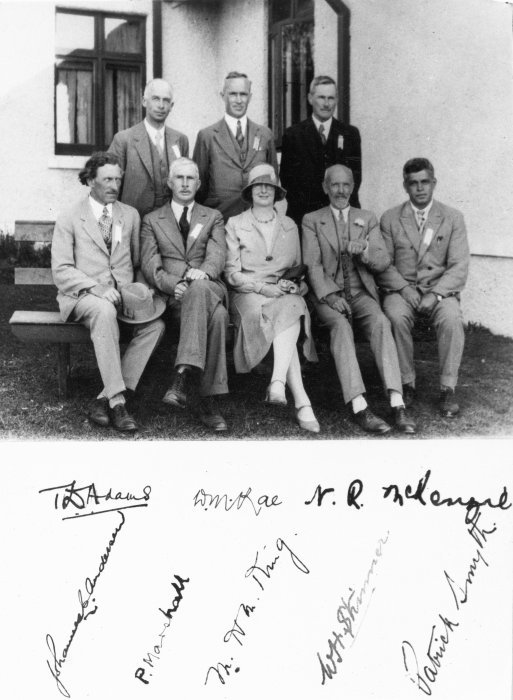
Skinner (seated, second from right) at a gathering of teachers and scholars in 1930

In 1892, Skinner was a founding member of the Polynesian Society. An active member, he held many roles over the next decades and was the society's president from 1925 to 1929.

Skinner had a deep interest in Taranaki history. He supported the local library and is regarded as the founder of the museum in New Plymouth, Puke Ariki, through his donation of Māori artefacts. His collection of Māori artefacts stemmed from his time as a surveyor when he frequently interacted with indigenous people. Outside of Taranaki, Skinner was instrumental in having the gannet colony at Cape Kidnappers in Hawke's Bay protected as well as the pa site in Marlborough's Port Underwood where the Treaty of Waitangi had been signed in 1840.

== Family ==
On 5 August 1880, Skinner married Margaret Bracken Devenish at St. Mary's Church. They had two daughters and one son; his son Harry also made a name for himself as an ethnographer. Skinner died in 1946 and was survived by his wife and children. He is buried at Te Henui Cemetery.

== Bibliography ==
- Skinner, William (1923). Taranaki, eighty years ago.
- Skinner, William (1933). Pioneer medical men of Taranaki.
- Skinner, William (1940). The establishment of the New Plymouth settlement.
- Skinner, William (1946). Reminiscences of a Taranaki surveyor. T. Avery.
