= 1988 Birthday Honours (New Zealand) =

Awards list for New Zealand

The 1988 Queen's Birthday Honours in New Zealand, celebrating the official birthday of Elizabeth II, were appointments made by the Queen in her right as Queen of New Zealand, on the advice of the New Zealand government, to various orders and honours to reward and highlight good works by New Zealanders. They were announced on 11 June 1988.

The recipients of honours are displayed here as they were styled before their new honour.

== Knight Bachelor ==
- Peter Herbert Elworthy – of Timaru. For services to agriculture.
- Spencer Thomas Russell – of Wellington; governor of the Reserve Bank of New Zealand.
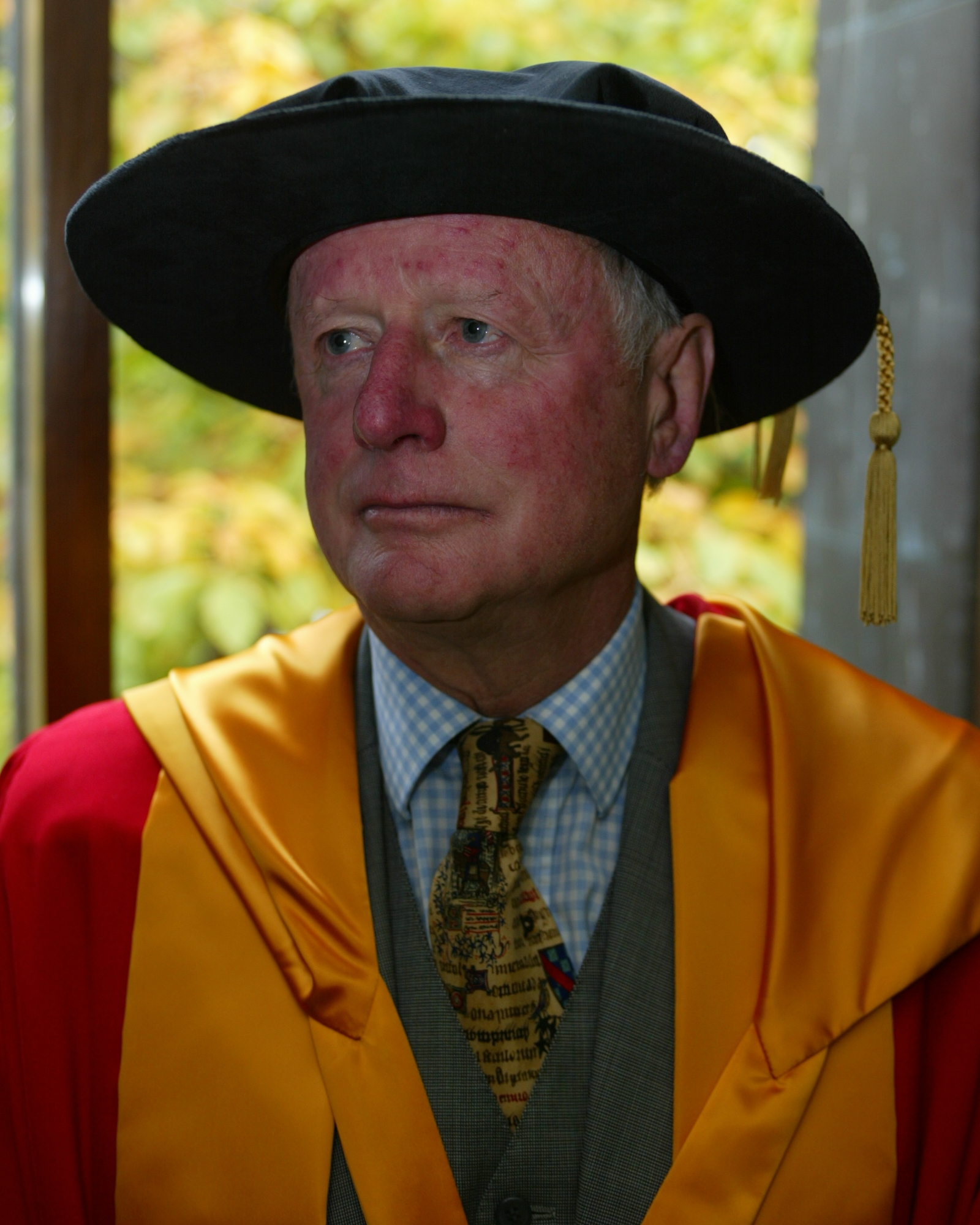
Sir Peter Elworthy

== Order of Saint Michael and Saint George ==
=== Companion (CMG) ===
- Barbara Angus – of Wellington. For diplomatic and community services.
- The Honourable Michael Aynsley Connelly QSO – of Christchurch. For public service.
- George Peter Shirtcliffe – of Wellington. For services to marketing and business management.
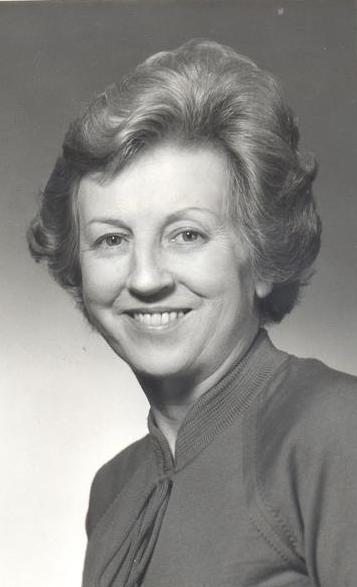
Barbara Angus

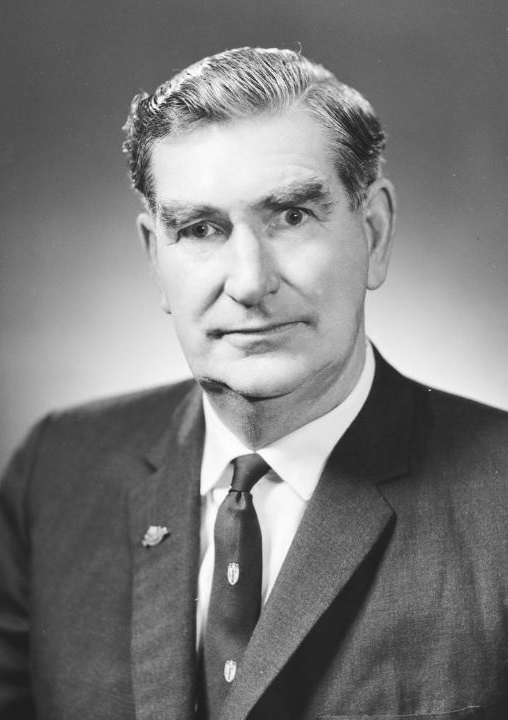
Mick Connelly

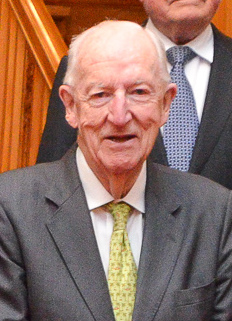
Peter Shirtcliffe

== Order of the British Empire ==
=== Dame Commander (DBE) ===
Civil division

- Margaret Laurence Salas QSO – of Wellington. For services to the community.

=== Knight Commander (KBE) ===
Civil division

- Professor Kenneth James Keith – of Wellington; professor of law, Victoria University of Wellington.
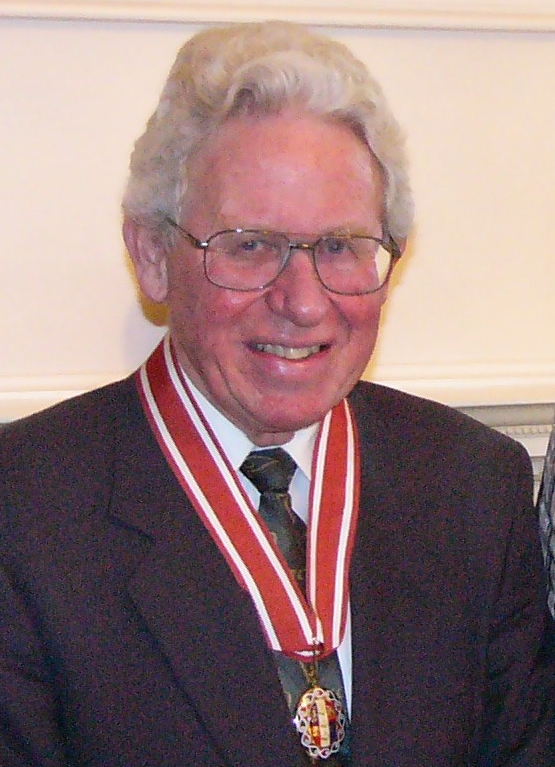
Sir Kenneth Keith

=== Commander (CBE) ===
Civil division

- Betty Bourke QSM JP – of Pātea. For services to health administration and the community.
- Peter Francis Clapshaw – of Auckland. For services to the legal profession.
- Emeritus Professor Peter David Hensman Godfrey MBE – of Waikanae. For services to music.
- Thomas Christopher Grigg QSO – of Hororata. For services to health administration.
- Dr (Mary) Anne Salmond – of Auckland. For services to literature and the Māori people.
- The Honourable Richard Christopher Savage – of Wellington; lately a judge of the High Court.
- Russell William Thomas OBE – of Christchurch. For services to rugby.

Military division

- Air Commodore Albert Edward Thomson OBE AFC – Royal New Zealand Air Force.
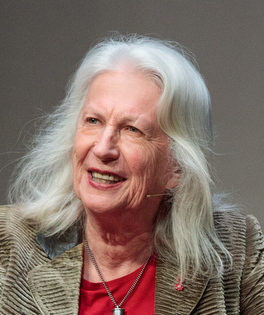
Anne Salmond

=== Officer (OBE) ===
Civil division

- Dr Edward Bassett – of Nelson. For services to the community.
- Colin George Blair – of Wellington. For services to accountancy.
- Kenneth William Cooper – of Gisborne. For services to local-body affairs.
- Assid Khaleel Corban JP – of Auckland. For services to local government and the community.
- Lindsay Marquis Graham – of Wellington. For public service.
- Kenneth Nigel Hampton – of Christchurch. For services to the legal profession.
- Leslie Hutchins – of Manapouri. For services to tourism.
- Rosemary Ellinor James – of Napier. For services to education and the community.
- Peter Ronald Mairs – deputy assistant commissioner, New Zealand Police.
- John Kinloch McKenzie – of Auckland. For services to agriculture and flood disaster relief programmes.
- Noel Francis Pachoud BEM – of Rotorua. For services to the community.
- Jack Richards – of Whakatāne. For services to education and the community.
- William John Robert Scollay DFC – of Wellington. For services to technology and the community.
- Dr Jean Anderson Seabrook MBE – of Christchurch. For services to speech therapy.
- Philip Charles Skoglund – of Palmerston North. For services to bowls.
- Evelyn Anne Taylor – of Hamilton. For services to netball.
- David Lindsay Waghorn – of Christchurch. For services to education.
- Ian Douglas Wells JP – of Wellington. For services to tennis.

Military division

- Captain Terence Mortimer O'Brien – Royal New Zealand Navy.
- Group Captain Brian Raymond Robert Knight – Royal New Zealand Air Force.
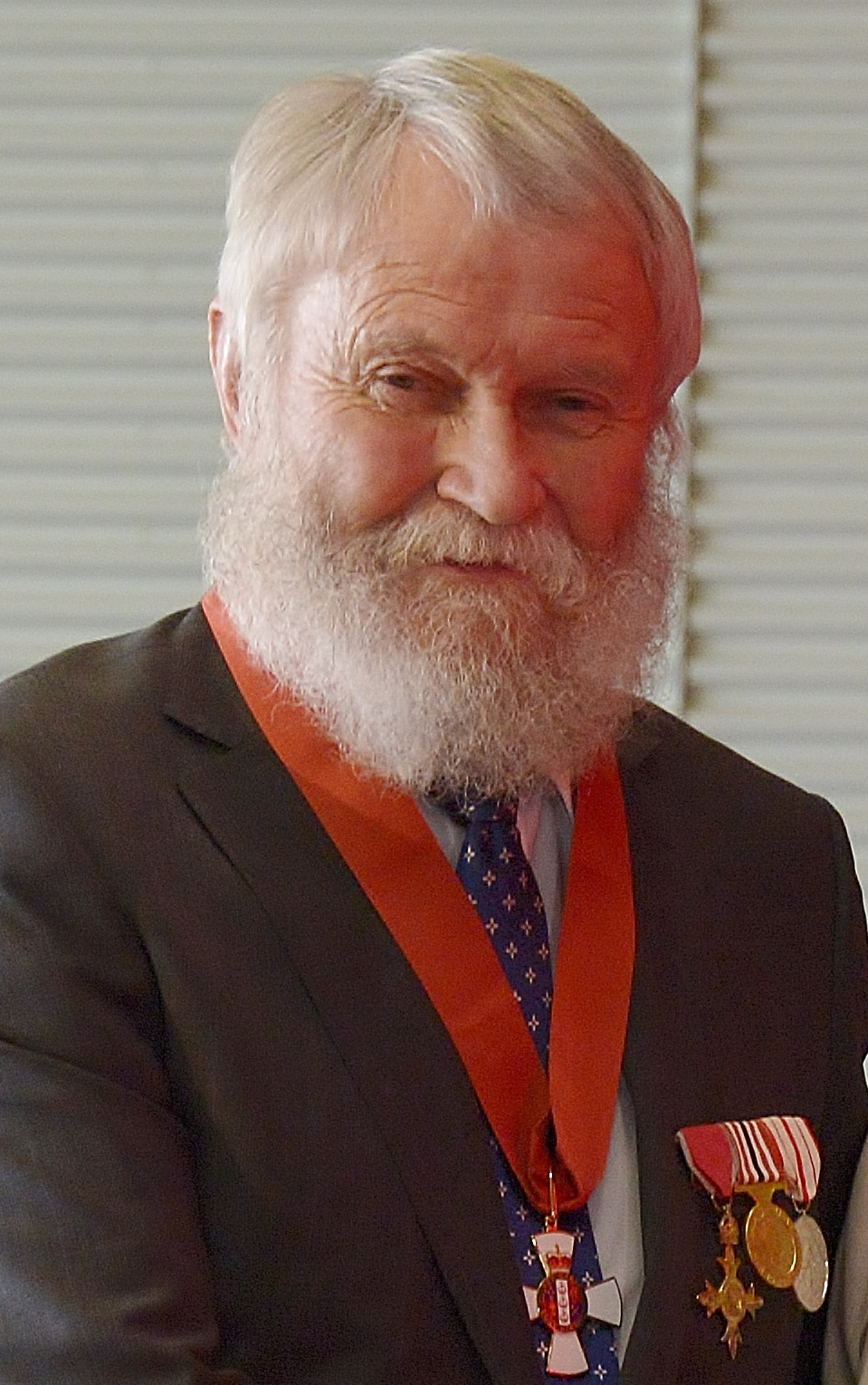
Nigel Hampton

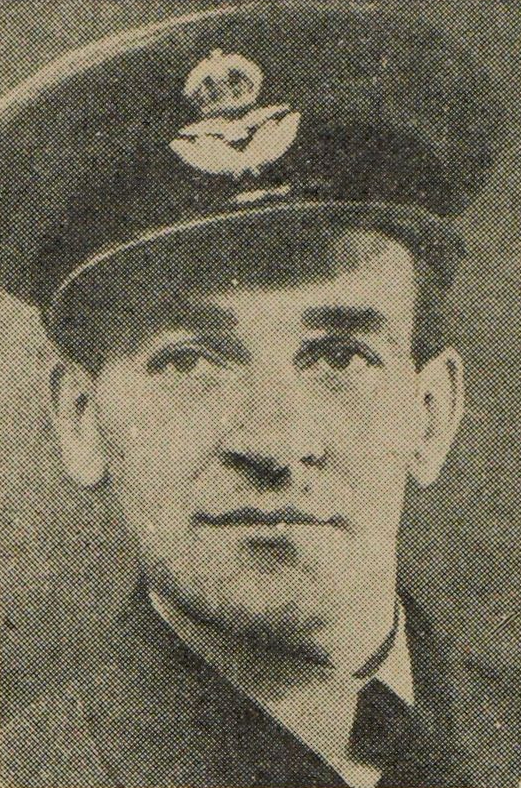
William Scollay

=== Member (MBE) ===
Civil division

- Peter James Belliss – of Wanganui. For services to bowls.
- Maurice Douglas Tukuha Bird – of Rotorua. For services to the Māori community.
- Kenneth Boyden – of Wellington. For services to local government and the community.
- Brian Bremner – of Wellington. For services to sport.
- Ian Antony Dickison – of Dunedin. For services to bowls.
- Graeme Dingle – of Tūrangi. For services to outdoor pursuits.
- Margery Vaughan, Lady Fletcher – of Auckland. For services to the community.
- The Reverend Keith Clifton Griffith – of Hastings. For services to the community.
- James Cyril Henley DCM ED – of Gisborne. For services to the community.
- Janet Rutherford Holm – of Christchurch. For services to the environmental movement.
- William Allan Laxon – of Auckland. For services to the community.
- Leon Clarence Leicester JP – of Auckland. For services to local government and the community.
- Jack Harold Lines – of Levin. For services to local government and the community.
- The Reverend John Raglan Maclean MM – of Mangonui. For services to the community.
- George Leslie Murdoch – of Auckland. For services to the community.
- Clive Brian Priestley – of Christchurch. For services to journalism.
- Geoffrey Alan Richards – of Auckland. For services to sport.
- Dr David Lloyd Richwhite – of Auckland. For services to medicine and the community.
- Colin Frank Stone – of Wellington. For services to the motor trade.
- Taitoko Rangiwhakateka Tawhiri – of Wanganui. For services to the community.
- Aila Hokireinga Te-teira Taylor – of Waitara. For services to the community.
- Jaqueline Roberta Trimmer – of Paekākāriki. For services to ballet.
- Tamihana (Thompson) Tukapua – of Levin. For services to the Māori people and the community.
- Dixon Wright – of Hamilton; lately director, Department of Maori Affairs, Hamilton.
- John Geoffrey Wright – of Christchurch. For services to cricket.
- Marie Honora Wright (Sister Marie Gabrielle) – of Lower Hutt. For services to education.

Military division

- Lieutenant Commander Alan Ross Dudley – Royal New Zealand Navy.
- Warrant Officer Class One John Leslie Carruthers – Royal New Zealand Infantry Regiment (Territorial Force)
- Captain and Quartermaster Graham Robert Waaka – Royal New Zealand Corps of Transport.
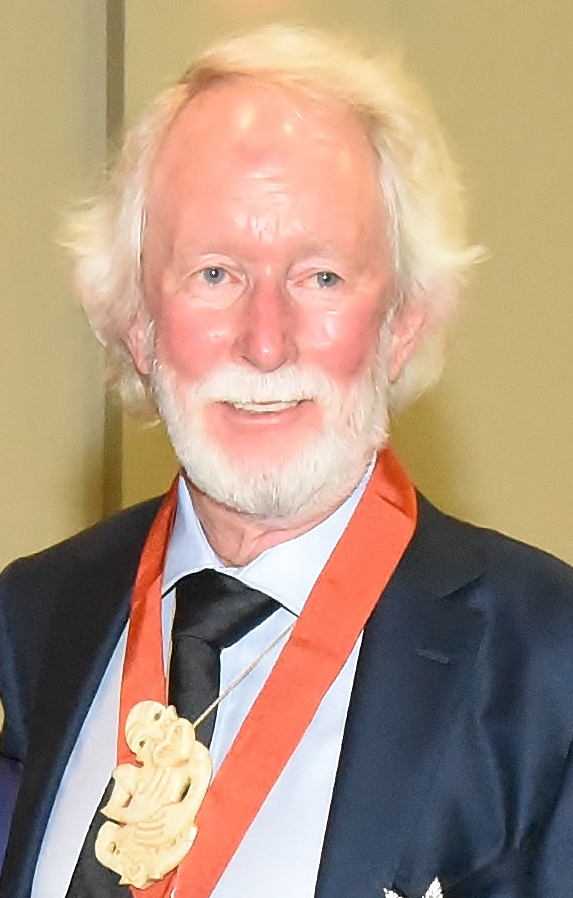
Graeme Dingle

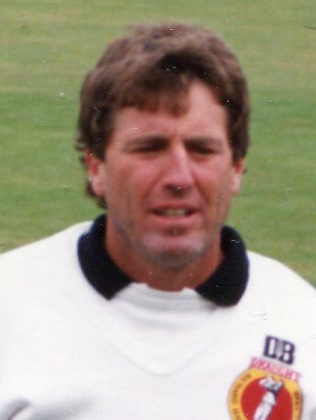
John Wright

== British Empire Medal (BEM) ==
Military division

- Staff Sergeant (Temporary Warrant Officer Class 2) Derrick Joseph McMillan – Royal New Zealand Infantry Regiment.
- Staff Sergeant Patrick Anthony Tracey – New Zealand Special Air Service (Territorial Force).
- Flight Sergeant Alan Colin McCord – Royal New Zealand Air Force.
- Flight Sergeant Colin Patrick Waite – Royal New Zealand Air Force.
- Flight Sergeant Brian Stewart Wynn – Royal New Zealand Air Force.

== Companion of the Queen's Service Order (QSO) ==
=== For community service ===
- Patricia Grace – of Plimmerton.
- Thomas Oliver Newnham – of Auckland.
- Stuart Edward Nicol MBE – of Christchurch.
- Wiremu (Bill) Ohia JP – of Tauranga.
- Glen Elna, Lady Rowling – of Nelson.
- Mary Richardson JP – of Upper Hutt.
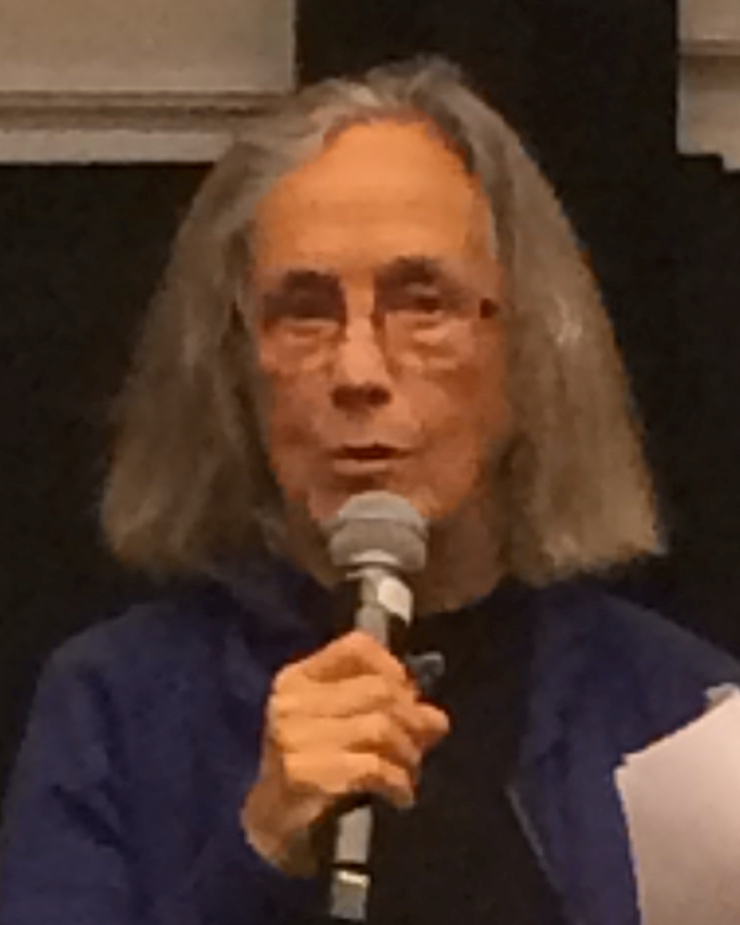
Patricia Grace

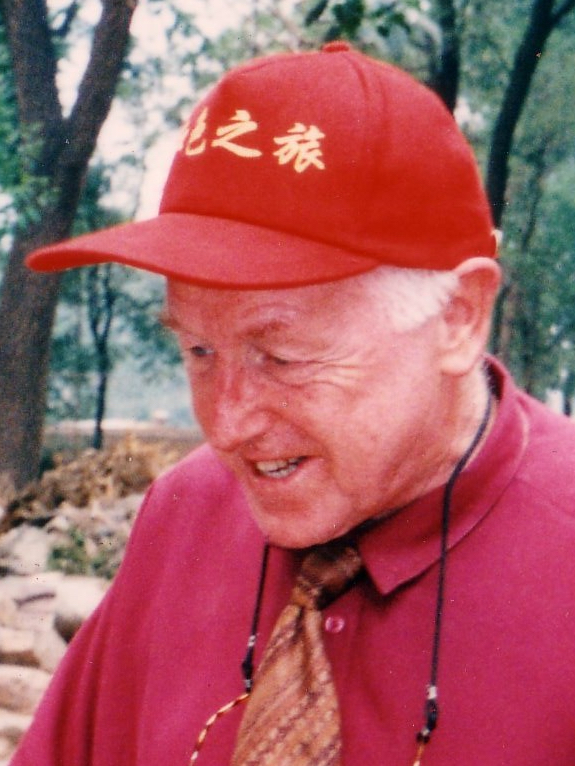
Tom Newnham

Glen, Lady Rowling

=== For public services ===
- The Reverend Joseph Akuhata-Brown JP – of Te Araroa.
- Dr Elizabeth Waugh Berry – of Auckland.
- The Honourable George Frederick Gair MP – of Auckland.
- Geoffrey Mason – of Dunedin.
- William Hales Reid – of Invercargill; lately a District Court judge.
- Kenneth James Thomas JP – of Morrinsville.
- Trevor James Young MP – of Lower Hutt.
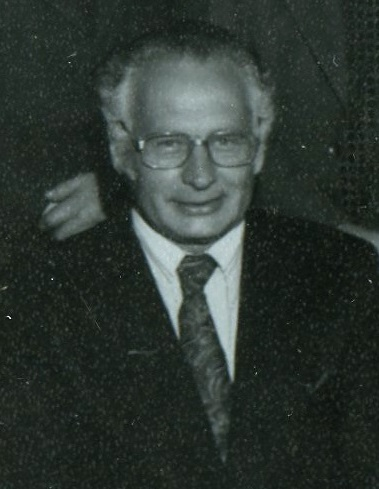
George Gair

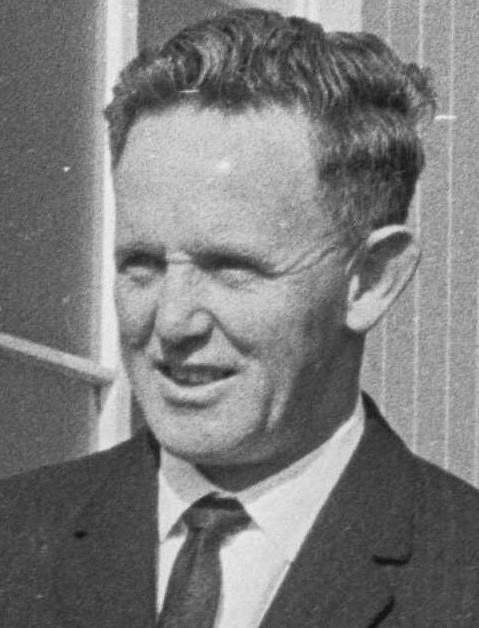
Trevor Young

== Queen's Service Medal (QSM) ==
=== For community service ===
- Lancelot Ewing Bardwell – of Dunedin.
- Mary Jean Annie Bell – of Hastings.
- David Edward Bolwell – of Nelson.
- Kathleen Waveney Bolwell – of Nelson.
- Mary Bragg – of Auckland.
- Leslie Robert Burgess – of Lyttelton.
- Lou Olin Henry Clauson – of Auckland.
- Margaret Joan Fickling – of Auckland.
- Kenneth William Gemmell – of Oamaru.
- Janet Gay Henderson JP – of Tauranga.
- Molimea 'Ilolahia RVM – of Auckland.
- David Arthur Johnston – of Papakura.
- Tufugaholoatu Susan Lagatule – of Christchurch.
- Maurice Teasdale Leech – of Pukerua Bay.
- James Francis Mandeno – of Te Awamutu.
- Simon Mehana (Haimona Ngarare) – of Redhead, New South Wales, Australia.
- Barbara Emily Mills – of Pukerua Bay.
- Metta Athalie Oversen Moltzen – of Hamilton.
- Joy Alison (Paddy) Nash – of Raumati Beach.
- Katherine Moyra Peet – of Christchurch.
- Rose Isobel Plunkett – of Paparoa.
- Veronica Elizabeth Ruth Pyle – of Christchurch.
- Joyce Emily Robertson – of Auckland.
- Lawson Arthur Robertson – of Wellington.
- Lawrence Frederick James Ross – of Christchurch.
- Patricia Ata Rouse – of Rawene.
- Selwyn George Searle – of Auckland.
- Turuhira Mahuone Tatare – of Gisborne.
- Colin Maxton Thomas JP – of Hokitika.
- Lindsay Jesse Tointon – of Christchurch.
- Derek Philip Fraser Turnbull – of Invercargill.
- Narshih Vallabh – of Wellington.
- John Fenton Walsh – of Christchurch.
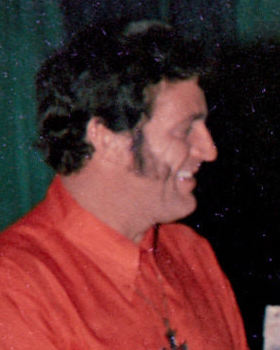
Lou Clauson

=== For public services ===
- John Takakopiri Asher – of Tūrangi.
- Rabindranath Gunasekaran Samuel Azariah – of Te Kūiti.
- Sidney Geraldine Blechynden – of Nelson.
- John Fairburn Buckland – of Auckland.
- Frank Burns – of Papatoetoe.
- Thomas Mangu Clarke JP – of Murupara.
- James William Squire Clevely JP – of Feilding.
- Neil Thomas Farrel JP – of Invercargill.
- Jessie Constance Hall – of Wellington.
- Michael John Hammersley JP – of Christchurch.
- Catherine (Kay) McKerr Harvey JP – of Auckland.
- Charles James Heaven – of Hamilton.
- Janet May Hesketh – of Wellington.
- Wikitoria Ann Jacobs JP – of Havelock North.
- Herbert John Keys ED – of Warkworth.
- Desmond Gordon King – of Christchurch.
- Nigel Llewellyn Langston JP – of Auckland.
- Frances Mary Cotchett Lee – of Wellington; lately director, America's directorate, Department of Trade and Industry.
- Charles James McFarlane – of Nelson.
- John (Makavilitogia Fuluatau) Maka – of Auckland.
- Charles Reuben George Masters – of Collingwood.
- Margaret Jean Mitchell – of Hastings.
- The Reverend Lawrence William More – of Auckland.
- Barrie Owen O'Brien JP – of Taradale.
- Henry Robert Pierson – of Hokitika.
- James William Rouse – senior constable, New Zealand Police.
- Shiu Hang Che – of Hong Kong; laundryman, Royal Navy, attached to Royal New Zealand Navy.
- Edward Simon Snowden DFC – of Ahipara.
- Leonard Storkey Spackman – of Auckland.
- The Reverend Pehalo Maika Talagi JP – of Auckland.
- Maye Aroha Tucker JP – of Hamilton.
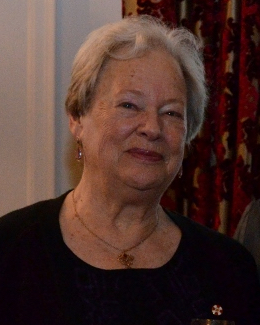
Janet Hesketh

== Royal Red Cross ==
=== Associate (ARRC) ===
- Major Rosemary Angela Bell – Royal New Zealand Nursing Corps.

== Queen's Fire Service Medal (QFSM) ==
- Cecil Edward Cross – senior station officer, Bluff Volunteer Fire Brigade, New Zealand Fire Service.
- Kenneth Patrick Derrick – fire commander, No 1A01 District (Auckland), New Zealand Fire Service.
- William Stanley Francis – senior station officer, Newlands Volunteer Fire Brigade, New Zealand Fire Service.
- Douglas George Vowles – chief fire officer, Ngāruawāhia Volunteer Fire Brigade, New Zealand Fire Service.

== Queen's Police Medal (QPM) ==
- Alan Clarence Lynskey – detective senior sergeant, New Zealand Police.

== Air Force Cross (AFC) ==
- Wing Commander Gordon Lennox Wood – Royal New Zealand Air Force.

== Queen's Commendation for Valuable Service in the Air ==
- Squadron Leader Craig Owen Inch – Royal New Zealand Air Force.
