= Huanaki =

In Niuean mythology, Huanaki is one of the five principal gods of the island. Along with Fao, Huanaki was one of the earliest settlers, who swam across from Tonga.

A story is told that Huanaki, along with Laga-iki, Fakahoko, Fao, and Lagi-atea, left the lost country (Fonuagalo), because they felt they had not been properly recognized at feasts. When they arrived in Niue, Fao was only able to place one of his feet on the ground. Huanaki completed Fao's work and the other three gods came to settle on the island.

Another version of the story is that these five gods were lazy and did no work toward preparing feasts. When their parents had prepared a feast, they received no portion of it because they had done nothing to help in its preparation. When they continued to do nothing in preparing feasts, their parents continued withholding any portion of it from them. The five gods then searched from an island where they could live away from their parents.

There is yet another local account by the people of Avatele, which says that the gods lived there underground and did not feed their children because they were lazy. Their children were angry enough to come to the earth's surface. First was Fao, who tried and failed to make the tides go out. Another god (perhaps Fakahoko) surfaced and also tried to send the tides out. When he also failed at this, Huanaki came up; he and Fao were successful in making the tides go out, producing waves on the ocean. Fakahoko, Huanaki, Lagaitea and Hatulia were the names of the children of the gods who also stopped living under the earth. When the female gods came to the earth's surface, they were eaten by a conger, which Hatulia then chopped into four pieces. Only in the Avatele version of the story are the female gods eaten by the eel; in all other accounts they simply came to the surface, and only in the Avatele version are the gods said to come from within the earth instead of Fonuagalo.
