= Tūhura Otago Museum =

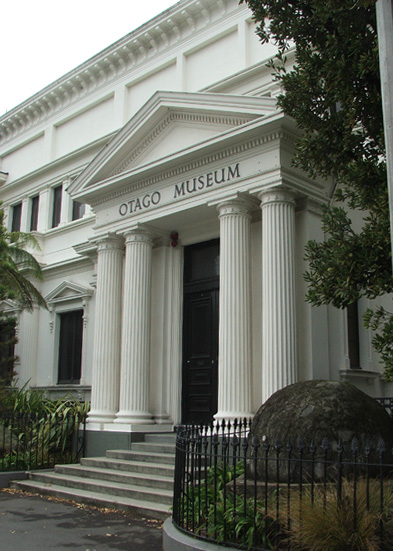
- Otago Museum original entrance, with its signature Moeraki boulder
- Established: 1868
- Location: Dunedin, New Zealand
- Coordinates: 45°51′56.44″S 170°30′39.03″E
- Type: Public museum
- Director: Ian Griffin
- Website: otagomuseum.nz

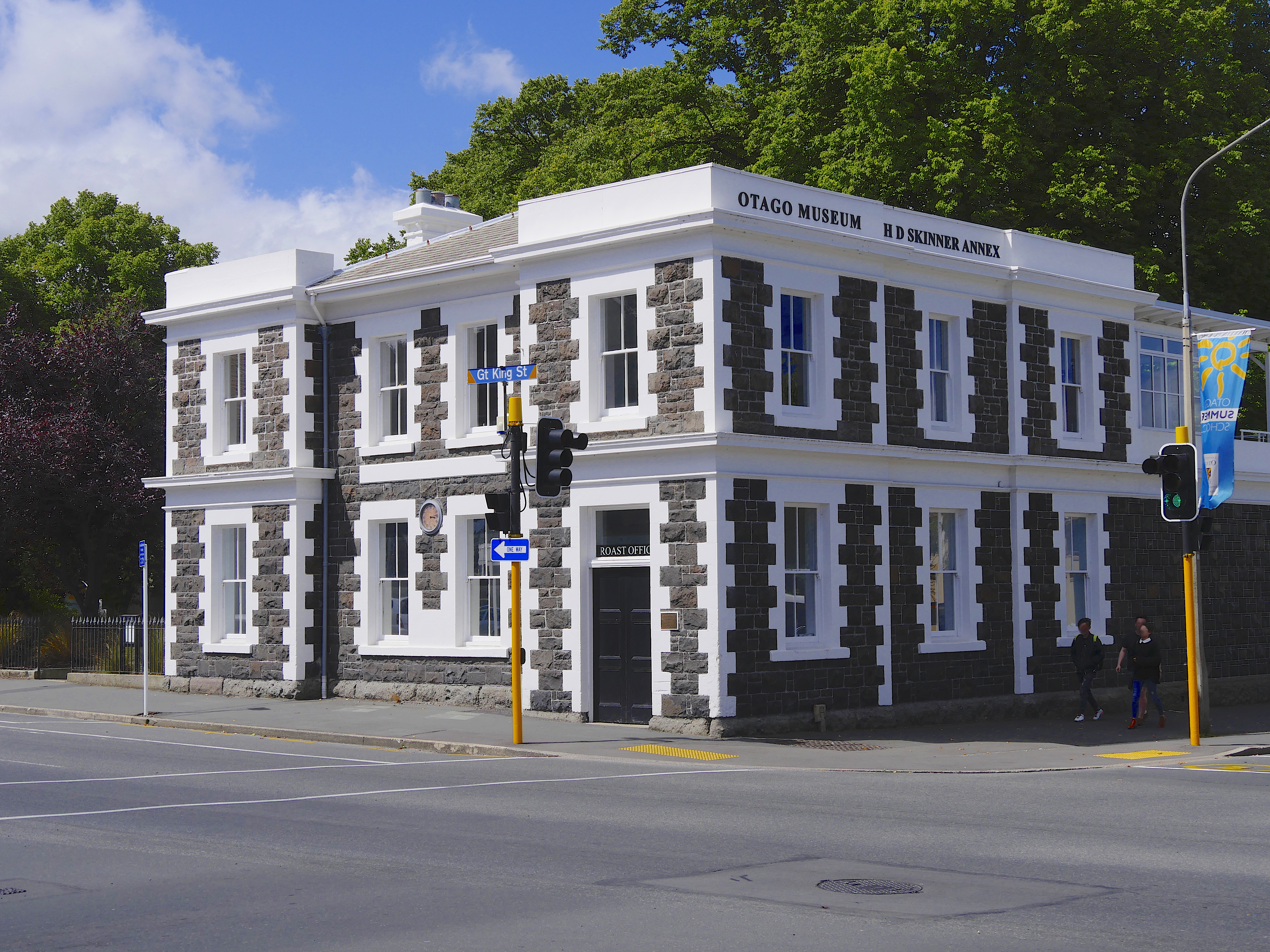
The H.D. Skinner Annex, a historic former post office added to the museum in 2013

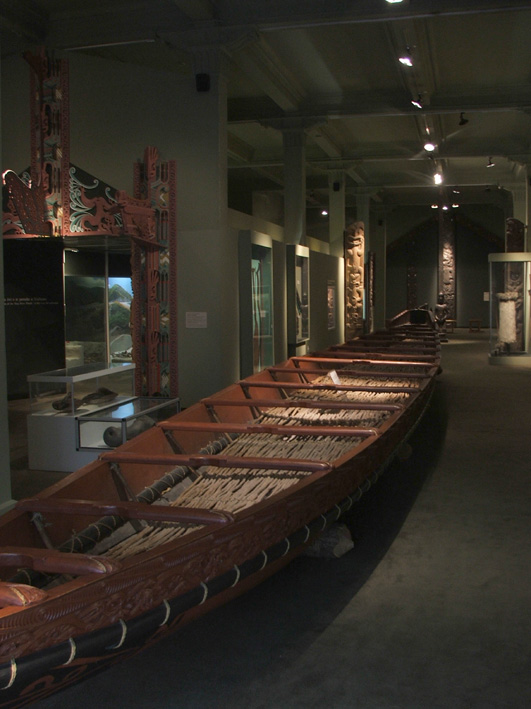
Tangata whenua (Māori) gallery

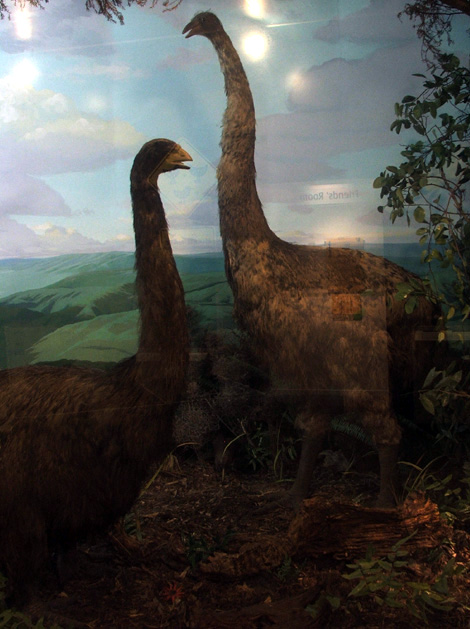
Reconstructed moa. The museum holds the world's largest collection of moa remains.

Tūhura Otago Museum, located near the city centre of Dunedin, New Zealand, adjacent to the University of Otago campus, is one of the country's largest museums and a prominent attraction in the city. The museum's extensive collections encompass natural science specimens and humanities artifacts from the Otago region and around the world, which are featured in its long-term gallery displays. A notable feature of the museum is its interactive science centre, which includes an immersive tropical rainforest butterfly house. In 2022, the museum was officially renamed Tūhura Otago Museum, incorporating the Māori name "Tūhura", meaning "to discover, investigate, and explore."

== History ==
=== Origins ===
The name "Otago Museum" was first used by James Hector to describe his geological collections on display at the 1865 New Zealand Exhibition, held in Dunedin. Some of these collections were the nucleus of the Otago Museum, which first opened to the public on 12 September 1868. The museum was originally located in the Dunedin Exchange building on Princes Street. As the collection began to grow, it soon became clear that a larger, purpose-built site was required; the foundation was laid at the current Great King Street site in December 1874. In August 1877, the new building, designed by Dunedin architect David Ross, was opened and remains a part of the museum today. The original entrance to the museum, with its Oamaru stone Doric-style pillars, is still visible on Great King Street, though the main entrance is now from the Museum Reserve.

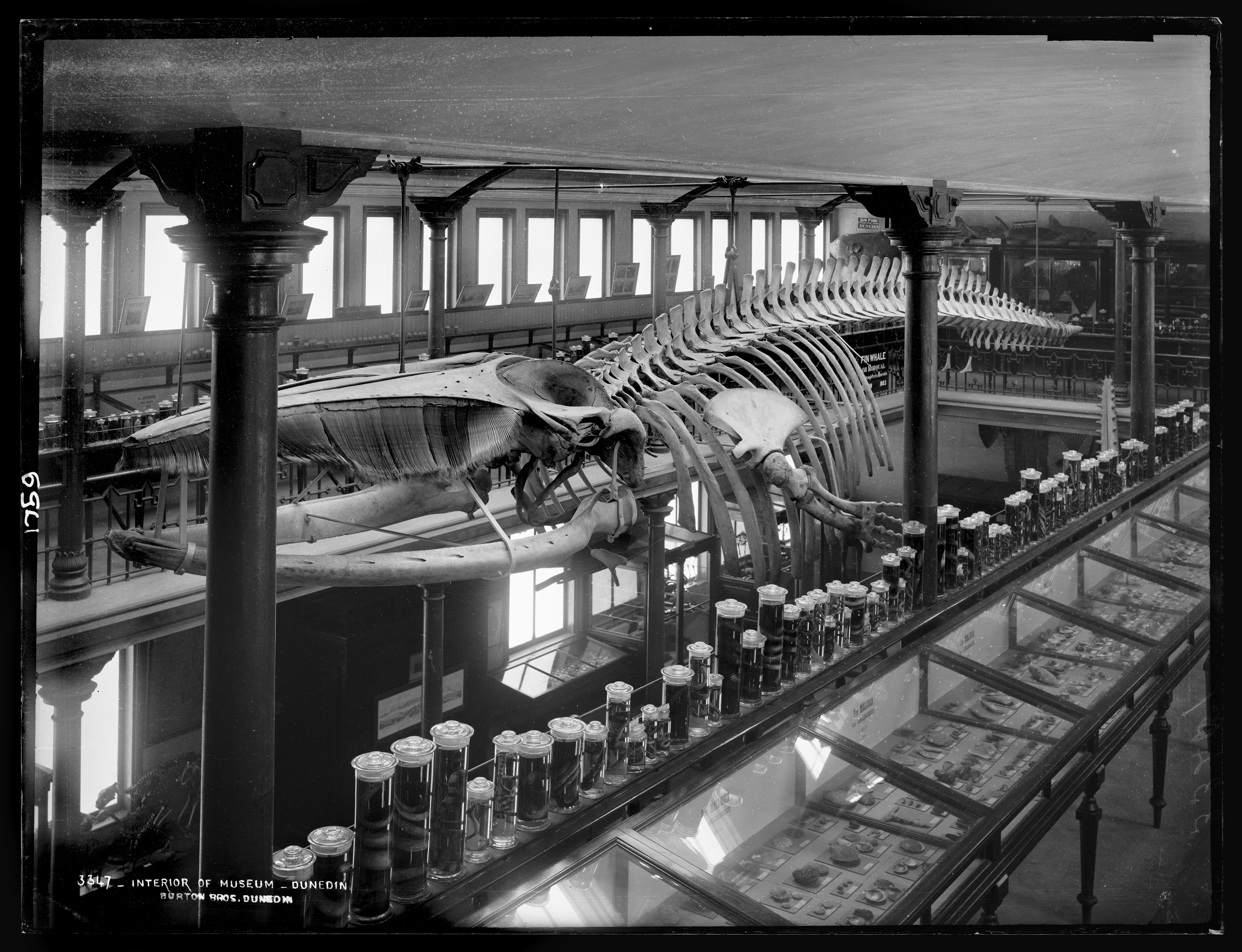
Interior of Otago Museum, between 1883 and 1886, by Burton Brothers studio, featuring a fin whale skeleton (mounted 1883) and a spirit collection of fish and reptiles.

Management of the museum passed to the University of Otago in 1877. This arrangement lasted until 1955 when a new governance structure was established by the passing of the Otago Museum Trust Board Act.

=== Architecture and development ===
With well over 100 years’ history on the current site, the museum building is classified by the Historic Places Trust as a Category 1 historic place.

The first substantial addition to the original Museum building on the Great King Street site was the Hocken Wing, designed by John Burnside and opened in 1910, housing Dr. Thomas Hocken's collection of manuscripts. This collection now forms the basis of the Hocken Collections. Another new wing, named for benefactor Willi Fels was opened in 1930 and today houses the People of the World and Tangata Whenua galleries. A further expansion of the museum occurred in 1963 when the Centennial Wing was opened to provide additional display space. With all of these separate developments, the museum had grown to several times its original floor area, resulting in a complex layout of multiple internally connected wings.

A multi-stage redevelopment project in the 1990s and 2000s largely resolved this, with the addition of architect Ted McCoy's spectacular integrating central Atrium. The collection storage area was also redeveloped with specialised shelving and environmentally controlled storerooms. The redevelopment project reached a milestone in 2002 when the Southern Land, Southern People gallery was opened by Sir Edmund Hillary, along with the governor general (then Dame Silvia Cartwright) and prime minister (then Helen Clark).

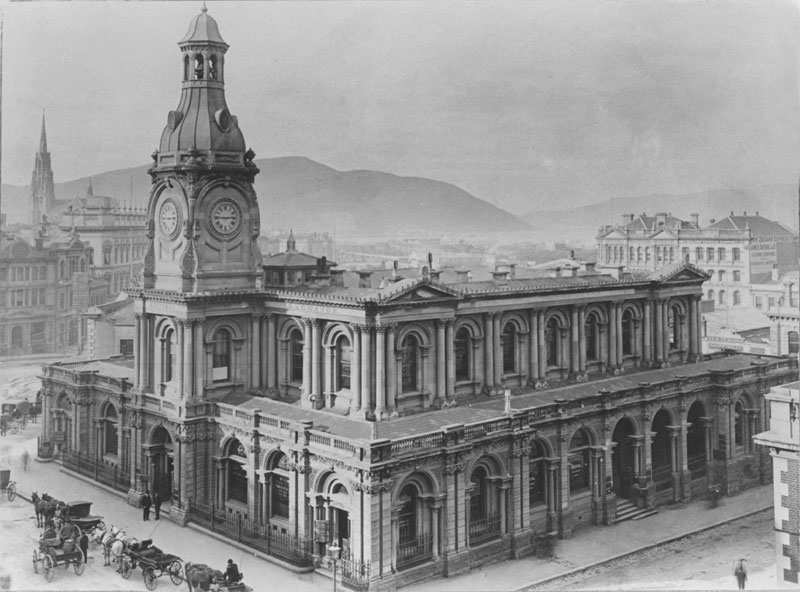
The Exchange Building, original home of the Otago Museum

The museum's interactive science centre, Discovery World, opened In 1991. During the redevelopment, it was moved from its original ground floor location to the first floor. The Tropical Forest, an immersive butterfly rainforest environment featuring the flora and fauna of the tropics, opened as a major addition to the science centre in 2007. Discovery World Tropical Forest has become an important visitor attraction in its own right. A planetarium was a further addition to the science centre in 2015. Over the course of 2017, Discovery World was further redeveloped, and opened in December of that year as the 'Tūhura Otago Community Trust Science Centre'.

2013 saw the opening of a redeveloped historic bluestone building on the Museum Reserve, which serves as an exhibition space and additional Museum venue. The building, now named the H. D. Skinner Annex after museum director Harry Skinner, was formerly the Dunedin North Post Office.

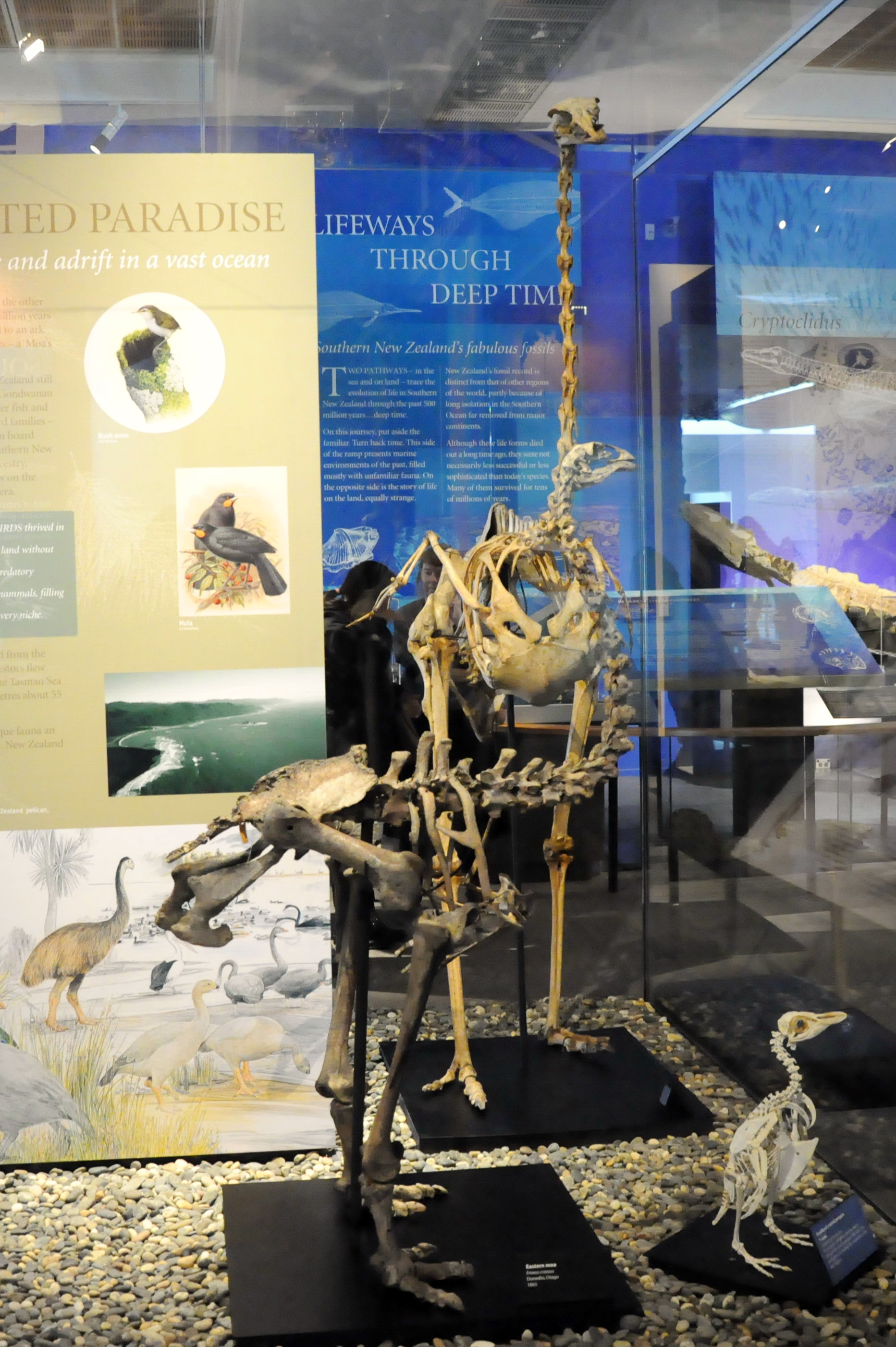
The skeleton of an eastern moa (Emeus crassus) compared to an ostrich and Fiordland crested penguin in the Otago Museum.

=== Benefactors ===
Largely due to benefactors, the Otago Museum has one of the most significant museum collections in New Zealand.

Many of the museum's key benefactors were part of the same eminent Dunedin family. Among them, German-born businessman Willi Fels had a long and impactful relationship with the museum. Fels contributed many items personally, as well as establishing a purchasing fund, facilitating acquisitions made by others, and encouraging others to pass on valuable items to the museum. He also coordinated the fundraising efforts for the construction of the wing ultimately named in his honour.

=== The museum’s collection ===
The museum's natural science holdings includes insect and type specimens that are internationally significant, with the spider collections including specimens from the wider Pacific area, as well as a representative collection of arachnids from around the world. Marine invertebrate specimens number in the 40,000s, while 30,000 bird specimens (including nests and eggs) are held. The moa collection is among the world's best, with two out of the three complete moa eggs in the world held, the Ettrick Egg and the First Earnscleugh Egg.

The humanities side of the museum's collection has strengths in both everyday and art items from all over Micronesia, Melanesia, Polynesia and Australia, in addition to an extensive collection of Māori taoka. From the rest of the world, the broad ethnographic collections include particularly significant collections of edged weapons and armour from India, ancient coins from the classical world, Islamic ceramics, and Ashanti goldweights. The museum also has some 150 cuneiform tablets and inscriptions in its collection, the largest known collection of its type in the southern hemisphere. Wide-ranging collections of pottery, jewellery, costume, glassware, clocks, furniture, stamps, guns, cameras, and stone tools are also held.

=== Attack on Queen Elizabeth ===
In 1981, Queen Elizabeth II was shot at while arriving onto the Otago Museum Reserve during a royal visit. The shooter, 17 year old Christopher John Lewis, had shot from the window of a nearby building, but missed the Queen. He escaped, but was taken into police custody eight days later, and would later reveal the BSA .22 bolt action rifle used, along with its spent cartridge, in a toilet on the fifth floor of the nearby Adams Building.

== Governance and funding ==
The museum is governed by the Otago Museum Trust Board with roles, responsibilities and selection of appointing bodies determined by the Otago Museum Trust Board Act 1996.

The Otago Museum Annual Plan 2018/19 states that over half of the museum's operational budget comes from "individual donations, commercial activity, corporate sponsorship, targeted government funding, and contracted services." The remainder of funding comes from the four contributing local authorities – the Dunedin City Council, the Clutha District Council, the Central Otago District Council and the Waitaki District Council. The calculation of each local authority's contribution is outlined in the Otago Museum Trust Board Act 1996.

== Leadership ==
Frederick Hutton, formerly the Otago Provincial Geologist, was a lecturer in both Zoology and Geology at the University of Otago, and was the Otago Museum Curator from 1873 to 1879. Hutton supervised the design of the original building on the Great King Street site and began to assemble a significant natural history collection.

His successor, Thomas Jeffery Parker, was an outstanding researcher and one of New Zealand's greatest biologists. During his tenure (1880–1897) he organised the natural history specimens along Darwinian lines and articulated many of the skeletons still on display in the Animal Attic. The humanities collection was started during Parker's time, prompted by the donation of an ancient Egyptian mummy by Bendix Hallenstein.

Spanning the 19th and 20th centuries was Sir William Blaxland Benham, a scientist of world renown, who was appointed Curator in 1898. He held the position for 39 years, while also holding the University of Otago Chair of Biology. Benham was knighted for his contribution to science and education in 1939.

The first New Zealand born leader of the museum was Henry Devenish Skinner, who was first appointed in 1937. Skinner was a pioneer in the field of anthropology in New Zealand, and is considered by many to have inaugurated Pacific anthropology. While Skinner's predecessors had focused primarily on the natural science collection, Skinner skilfully built the humanities collection, working closely with friend and major benefactor Willi Fels.

In 1957, Raymond Robert Forster became the first new director appointed under the Otago Museum Trust Board Act. Forster ushered in a period of intense research in the biological sciences at the museum. Becoming a world authority on the biology and classification of spiders, Forster brought together a significant arachnid collection, with representative species from around the world.

Richard Cassels became director after Forster in 1987, and began a process of focusing the museum on its responsibilities to the wider community. During Cassels’ time as director, the Museum Trust Board made a commitment to the establishment of a science centre.

Shimrath Paul was appointed director in 1995, after joining the team in 1990 to set up the museum's interactive science centre (Discovery World). Paul oversaw a comprehensive multi- stage redevelopment, which, along with a renewed focus on visitor experience, transformed the museum into a hub for the local community and a world-class visitor attraction. The redevelopment also addressed collection storage, which now reflects international best practice. Under Paul's leadership, the museum's Tropical Forest, a three-level indoor butterfly rainforest experience, was also completed in 2007. During Paul's tenure, visitor numbers increased from around 250,000 per annum, peaking an over 600,000. In 2012, Paul resigned after ongoing controversy over his level of pay and staff morale.

Dr. Ian Griffin, the museum's eighth and current director, was appointed to the role in May 2013. With a PhD in astronomy and the discovery of 27 asteroids among his accomplishments, Griffin brings a strong scientific background to the museum. Griffin's last role before joining the museum was as chief executive of the Oxford Trust in Oxford, England – a charitable foundation encouraging the pursuit of science. His other previous roles have included Director of the Museum of Science and Industry in Manchester, England; Head of Office of Public Outreach and Director NASA Origins Education Forum Space Telescope Science Institute; and CEO of the Auckland Observatory and Planetarium Trust. Griffin has also been appointed an honorary fellow in the University of Otago Physics Department.

== Galleries and exhibitions ==
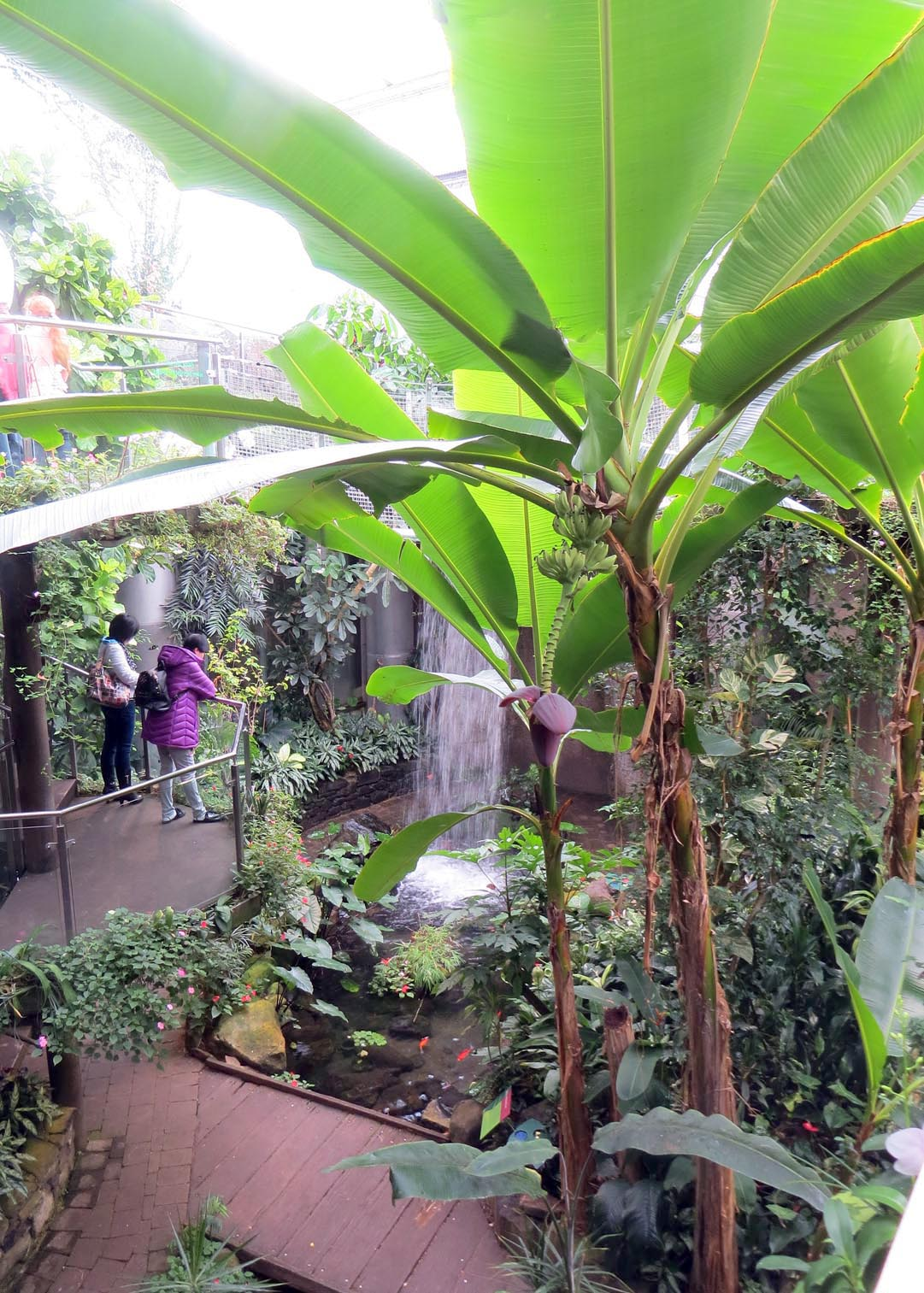
The Tūhura Tropical Forest is an immersive three-storey attraction featuring many species of tropical butterfly and other tropical fauna and flora.

=== Long-term galleries ===
Otago Museum has seven long-term galleries:

- Southern Land, Southern People: geological and natural history of Otago; natural resources as used by the people of the south; a plesiosaur fossil, considered to be New Zealand's largest fossil specimen, is a feature exhibit.
- Tangata Whenua: Māori taoka (treasures/artefacts), with a focus on Southern Māori.
- The Nature gallery: natural science specimens and stories from Otago, including an historic moa diorama.
- Animal Attic: a Victorian-inspired zoological gallery, with nearly 3,000 historical specimens, including the Lawrence lions, a male and female lion which escaped from a travelling circus in the town of Lawrence in 1978.
- People of the World: humanities artefacts from all over the world, including an ancient Egyptian mummy.
- Pacific Cultures: masks, tools, weapons and more from the islands and cultures of Polynesia, Micronesia and Melanesia.
- The Maritime gallery: maritime history of Otago and New Zealand with over 50 model ships and an historic fin whale skeleton.

Alongside the galleries, another long-term offering is:

- Tūhura Otago Community Trust Science Centre, the museum's interactive science centre. The centre has two distinct sections: the first explores science (primarily physics and technology) through interactive exhibits; the second is an immersive rainforest experience. Known as the Tropical Forest, it houses hundreds of exotic, live butterflies, as well as other tropical flora and fauna, in a three-level environment with a six-metre waterfall.

=== Exhibitions ===
The museum's large Special Exhibitions Gallery on Level 1 is its primary display area for temporary exhibitions on wide-ranging themes. Temporary exhibitions are also displayed in other parts of the museum, including the Atrium end of the People of the World gallery. Some exhibitions are developed in-house, while others tour from elsewhere in New Zealand or the world. Associations and partnerships with international museums have brought world class exhibitions to Otago, and seen Otago Museum exhibitions reach wide audiences. For example, the Shanghai Museum sent The Emperor’s Dragons to Otago Museum in 2008; with dragon motifs as its theme, the exhibition included ancient artefacts never previously seen outside of China. As an exchange exhibition, Otago Museum sent Te Ao Māori: Māori Treasures from the Otago Museum, New Zealand to Shanghai in 2011. It was the first exhibition of Māori artefacts in a Chinese museum. Te Ao Māori was visited by over 600,000 people.

== Community programmes and education ==
Thousands of school students visit the Otago Museum every year for curriculum-based programmes relating to galleries or exhibitions. The museum also offers a popular ‘sleepover’ programme to school groups. A portable planetarium (‘Starlab’) provides astronomy experiences both onsite or at schools in the region.

A wide range of community programmes and events that complement the exhibitions and galleries are also organised by the Otago Museum. Offerings, which are often free, include family fun days, workshops, guest speakers, film screenings, children's activities and daily gallery talks. The museum lists upcoming programmes on its website.

== Functions and events ==
The museum has a range of spaces that are regularly hired for conferences, meetings, dinners, receptions, balls and cocktail parties. This is one of the ways that the museum is able to raise funds to contribute to the operating budget.

== Awards ==
- Qualmark Endorsed Visitor Activity
- Qualmark Gold status
- Winner of six New Zealand Tourism Awards, including Best Visitor Attraction and Activity in NZ
- Winner of five Westpac/Otago Chamber of Commerce Business Excellence Awards, including the Supreme Business Award in 2004

== Notable people ==
- Lily Daff (1885–1945), artist and Officer in Charge of Exhibitions
- Harry Skinner (1886–1978), ethnologist and museum director
- Lyn Forster (1925–2009) and Ray Forster (1922–2000), arachnologists
