= Willi Fels =

Willi Fels CMG
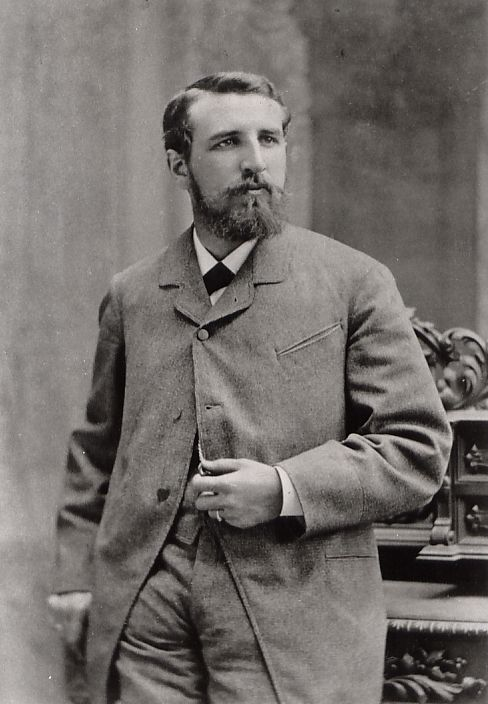
- Born: 17 April 1858; Halle an der Weser, Germany
- Died: 29 June 1946 (aged 88); Dunedin, New Zealand
- Spouse: Sara Elizabeth Hallenstein (m. 1881; died 1918)
- Relatives: Bendix Hallenstein (uncle and father-in-law); Charles Brasch (grandson)

Willi Fels CMG (17 April 1858 – 29 June 1946) was a New Zealand merchant, collector and philanthropist.

== Biography ==
Fels was born in Halle an der Weser, Germany on 17 April 1858 to Heinemann Wilhelm Fels and his wife Kätchen Hallenstein. He was the eldest of the couple's four children. Fels had a keen interest in history and classics, but rather than going to university he became manager of the family's woollen mill near Paderborn.

In 1881 Fels was visited by his uncle, Bendix Hallenstein, and married his cousin Sara, Hallenstein's eldest daughter, in November of the same year. Willi and Sara had three daughters Helene, Emily and Kate; and one son Harold who was killed in World War I.

Hallenstein had become prominent in the New Zealand city of Dunedin as a merchant in the years immediately following the 1862 Otago gold rush, and in 1888 the Fels moved to Dunedin to join Hallenstein's family business, Hallenstein Brothers. Fels eventually became managing director of this firm and the connected Drapery and General Importing Company.

Fels was an avid collector, and his journeys through the young colony on business afforded him the opportunity to collect Māori and Polynesian art and artefacts. He also collected ethnological art and artefacts from southern and eastern Asia (such as Ukiyo-e), and many classical artefacts and historical literature.

He and New Zealand ethnologist Harry Skinner of the University of Otago and Otago Museum had a long association. Fels established the first fund for the purchasing ethnological collections at the Otago Museum, which subsequently named the Fels Wing of the museum in his honour in 1930.

After the death of Fels' only son Harold (1891-1917) who was killed in action in France in World War I, Fels decided to bequeath his collection to the Otago Museum, and also began a fund which greatly increased the museum's collections. In 1930, a new wing, the Fels Wing, was added to the museum. Total additions to the museum's collection by Fels, either during his lifetime or through his will, totalled over 70,000 pieces and funds of some £25,000. Many of his most valuable books were also donated to the University of Otago's library. These included many first editions, illuminated manuscripts, and other rare works. The university also benefitted from Fels' endowment of a lectureship in ethnology during the 1920s.

In 1935, Fels was awarded the King George V Silver Jubilee Medal. He was appointed a Companion of the Order of St Michael and St George, for services to ethnology in New Zealand, in the 1936 New Year Honours. He died at his residence in Dunedin in 1946 and his ashes were interred at the Southern Cemetery in a plot with Bendix Hallenstein.

Fels' family were prominent in the arts and culture of southern New Zealand for many years, his cousins, the De Beers (including Esmond Samuel de Beer), and grandson Charles Brasch also making a permanent mark on the country's cultural life.
