= Harry Skinner (ethnologist) =

New Zealand ethnologist

Harry Skinner CBE DCM
- Born: Henry Devenish Skinner; 18 December 1886; New Plymouth, New Zealand
- Died: 9 February 1978 (aged 91); Dunedin, New Zealand
- Awards: Parker Memorial Prize; Percy Smith Medal (1925); Hector Memorial Medal and Prize (1926); Andre Medal (1936); Honorary LittD Otago (1962)
- Scientific career
- Fields: Anthropology; ethnology
- Workplaces: Otago Museum; University of Otago; Hocken Library
- Relatives: William Skinner (father)

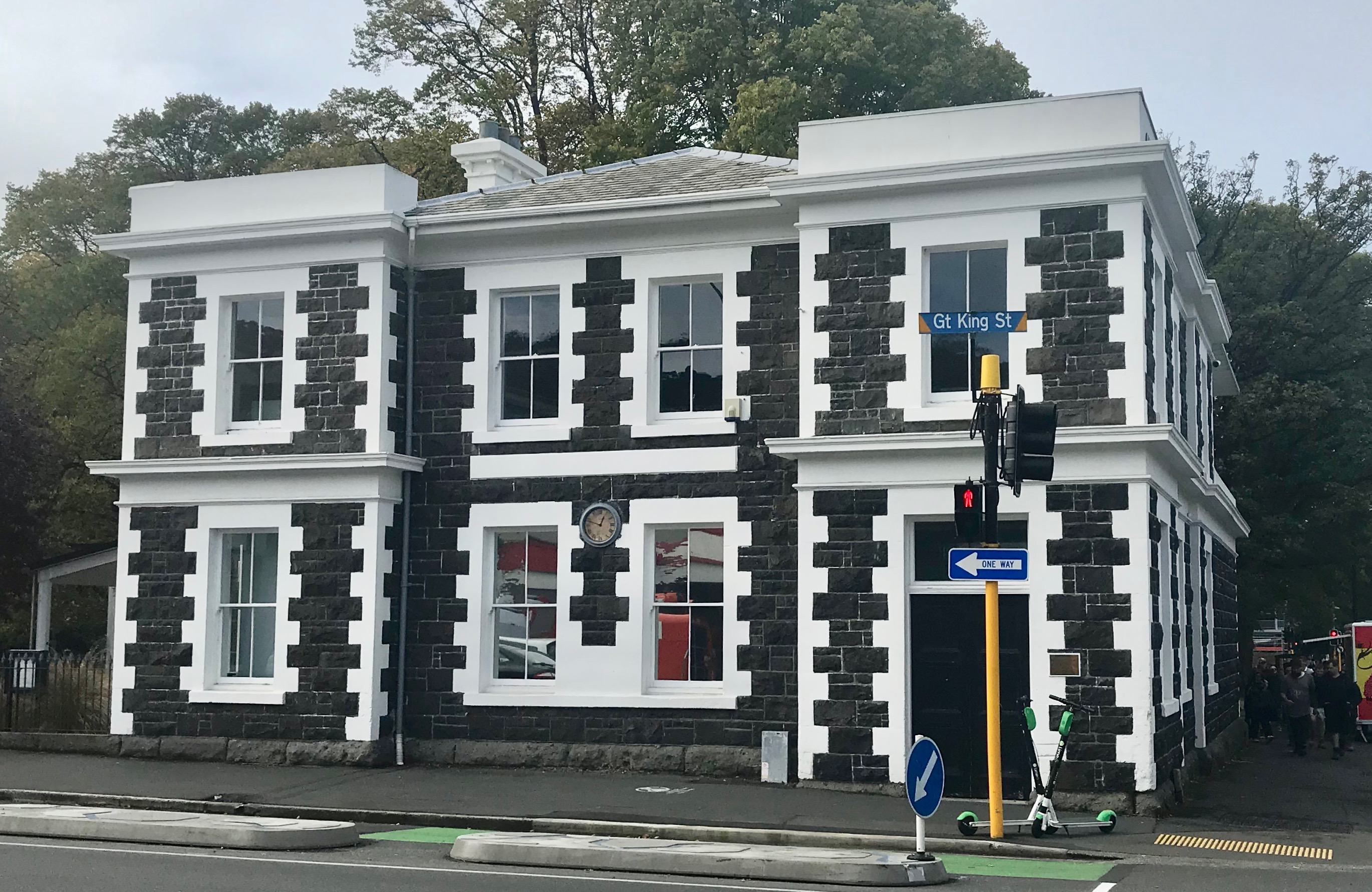
H.D. Skinner Annex of Otago Museum

Henry Devenish Skinner CBE DCM (18 December 1886 – 9 February 1978), known as Harry Skinner or H.D. Skinner, was a notable New Zealand soldier, ethnologist, university lecturer, museum curator and director, and librarian.

== Early life and education ==
The son of William Skinner and Margaret Bracken Devenish, Henry Devenish Skinner was born in New Plymouth, New Zealand, on 18 December 1886.

Skinner enrolled in the cadet corps at New Plymouth Central School aged 11, and did his secondary schooling at Nelson College from 1902, as a boarder.

From 1906 to 1909 he studied law at Victoria University College in Wellington, and in 1911 enrolled for a B.A. at the University of Otago in Dunedin, at least partly because he had met his future wife and her family had moved there. There he earned the Parker Memorial Prize in zoology.

== Career ==
He enrolled at Christ's College, Cambridge, England, in 1917, after developing an interest in the work of ethnologist by A. C. Haddon. Skinner started studying Māori and in particular the Moriori culture of the Chatham Islands, earning a diploma in anthropology in 1919.

After returning to New Zealand, Skinner's monograph, The Morioris of Chatham Islands was accepted for the degree of B.A. (Research) at Cambridge in 1923, which challenged the traditional view that Moriori people were descended from a Melanesian people, and established that they were in fact Polynesian. He returned to the Chathams as one of the scientists on the 1924 Chatham Islands Expedition.

Skinner's appointments included:

- Acting Curator, Otago Museum (1912-13)
- Teacher, Palmerston North Boys' High School (1914)
- Assistant Curator, Otago Museum (1919)
- Assistant Director, Otago Museum (1919-37)
- Lecturer in Anthropology, University of Otago (1919-54; the first such position in Australasia)
- Director, Otago Museum (1938-52); Director Emeritus (1953)

He developed a long association with Willi Fels at the University of Otago.

Other roles included being president of the Polynesian Society (1950-54), and founding chairman of the New Zealand Archaeological Association in 1955.

Skinner received information on Māori house types and construction methods from Mere Harper.

== Soldier ==
Skinner volunteered for military service at the end of 1914, after World War I had begun. He was a private in the 14th Company of Otago Battalion, and sailed for Egypt in April 1915. He fought with the Anzacs at Gallipoli in World War I, and was wounded there and discharged as unfit for service in late 1915 after being evacuated to Britain and promoted to lance corporal.

Skinner served as an intelligence officer with the New Zealand Home Guard in World War II.

== Recognition and honours ==
=== Military ===
During his service with the First New Zealand Expeditionary Force, Skinner gained a mention in despatches for his bravery, and on 8 October 1915 was awarded the Distinguished Conduct Medal.

=== Academia ===
In 1918 Skinner was elected to the council of the Royal Anthropological Institute of Great Britain and Ireland.

He was awarded the Percy Smith Medal (which he himself was instrumental in founding) in 1925, the Hector Memorial Medal in 1926, and the Andree Medal in 1936.

He was a Fellow of the Royal Society of New Zealand in 1927.

In 1938 he was awarded a Doctor of Science by the University of New Zealand.

In 1953, Skinner was awarded the Queen Elizabeth II Coronation Medal. In the 1956 New Year Honours, he was appointed a Commander of the Order of the British Empire (CBE), for services as director of Otago Museum and lecturer in anthropology at the University of Otago.

In 1962, he was awarded a LittD by the University of Otago.

The H.D. Skinner Annex of the Otago Museum, formerly the Dunedin North Post Office, was opened in August 2013, and named in honour of Skinner. During his time at the museum, Skinner was responsible for adding more than 65,000 objects to the humanities collections, including purchasing a piece of HMS Bounty from one of Fletcher Christian's direct descendants.

Skinner was one of 24,000 Anzac soldiers wounded at Gallipoli. In 2015, the Otago Museum opened the exhibition "Surviving Chunuk Bair: H. D. Skinner at Gallipoli'' using objects loaned by the Skinner family, including a sewing kit, medals, letters and photographs.

== Personal life ==
Skinner married Eva Louisa Gibbs on 5 December 1915 in Southampton, England, and they had two sons, but one was stillborn. She died in 1963.

== Death and legacy ==
Skinner developed Alzheimer's, and he died on 9 February 1978 in Dunedin.

He is especially remembered for helping to reinvigorate and expand the Otago Museum; he reported in 1951 that the museum had gained over 100,000 acquisitions since 1919. His work had a big influence on the development of anthropology and ethnology in New Zealand, and his analyses of Māori material culture set the standard and methods for the following 50 years. Several generations of archaeologists, especially in southern New Zealand, were inspired by his teachings.
