= Tilalofonua =

Mythological creature

In Niuean mythology, Tilalofonua is a flying rat and one of the gods of the island.

Tilalofonua cited in the book History and Traditions of Niue as "god of the kuma", the kuma being the rat and bird of the heavens. According to myth, Tilalofonua was said to have begged Halevao (peka/flying fox) for some wings, but to no avail. Tilalofonua prayed for a long time and was eventually granted them by Halevao after demonstrating his love. Halevao said "Come then. That I may give you my wings that you may have a short trial of them".
