= Ann Monroe Gilchrist Strong =

American professor of home science

Ann Monroe Gilchrist Strong OBE (1875–1957) was a notable New Zealand university professor of home science. She was born in Carthage, Illinois, United States, in 1875.

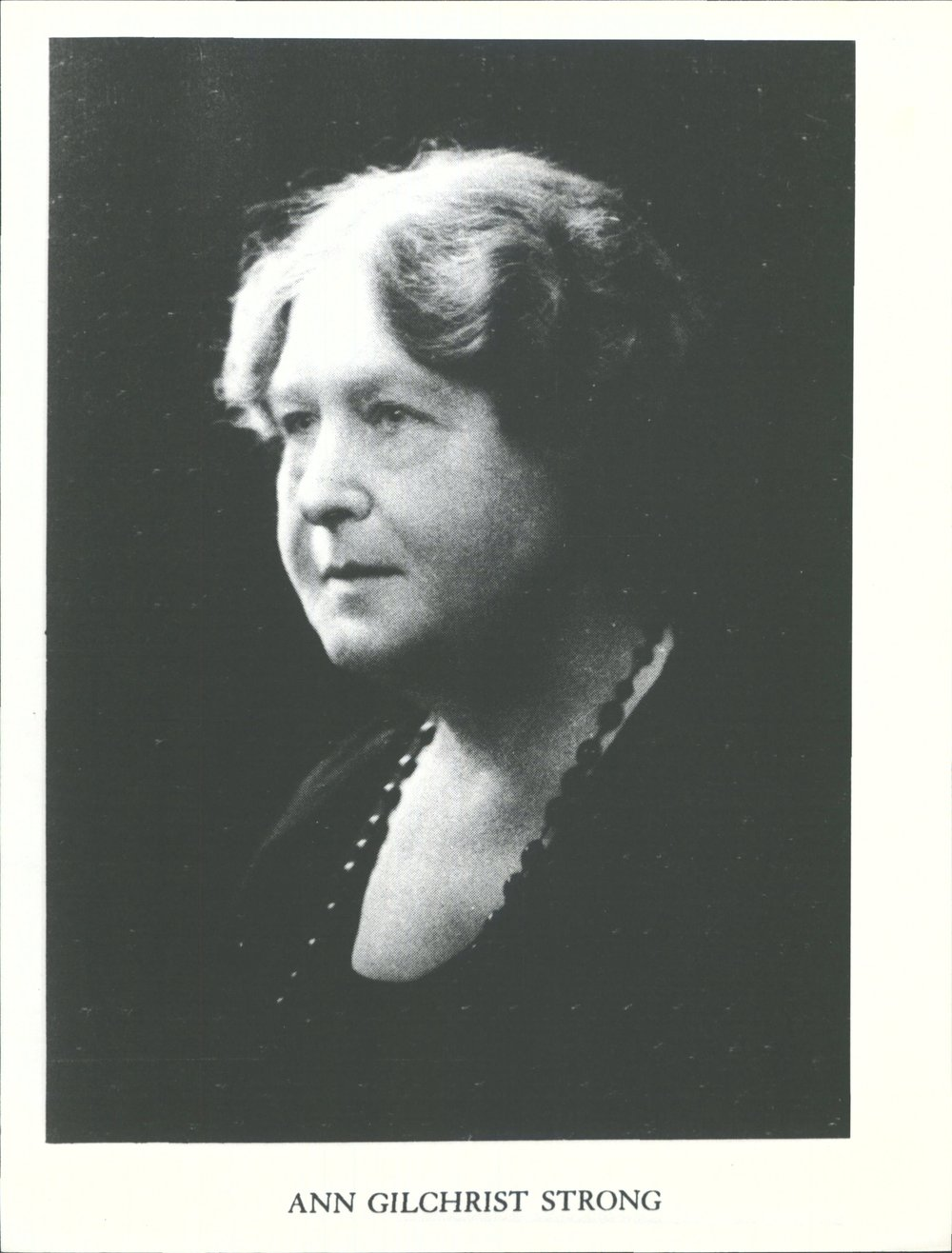
Image of Ann Gilchrist Strong

In the 1936 New Year Honours, Strong was appointed an Officer of the Order of the British Empire.
