= Peter Shirtcliffe =

New Zealand businessman (born 1931)

Peter Shirtcliffe CMG
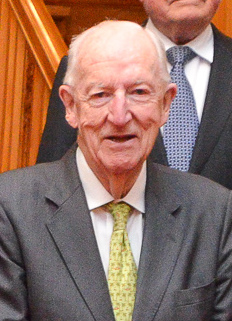
- Shirtcliffe in 2021
- Born: 28 July 1931 (age 93); Palmerston North, New Zealand
- Occupation: Businessman
- Spouse: Margaret Cecilia Bryden (m. 1966; died 1999)
- Children: 3
- Relatives: George Shirtcliffe (grandfather)

George Peter Shirtcliffe (born 28 July 1931) is a New Zealand businessman. He was the chairman of Telecom New Zealand, New Zealand's largest listed company, from 1990 to 1999.

== Early life and family ==
Shirtcliffe was born in Palmerston North on 28 July 1931, the son of Nancy Vida Catherine Shirtcliffe (née Lyons) and Geoffrey Shirtcliffe (1906–1948). Sir George Shirtcliffe (1862–1941) was his grandfather. He received his primary education at Wellesley College and Huntley School, and his secondary education at Wanganui Collegiate School. He graduated from Victoria University of Wellington in 1955 with a Bachelor of Commerce. In 1966, he married Margaret Cecilia Bryden, and they had one son and two daughters.

== Career ==
=== Business career ===
- Director, Telecom Corporation of New Zealand Limited 1999–2001
- Chairman, Telecom Corporation of New Zealand Limited 1990–1999
- Deputy chairman, Telecom Corporation of New Zealand Limited 1987–1990
- Founding chairman, New Zealand Trade Development Board 1986–1990
- Chairman, Venture Pacific Ltd 1986–1989
- Chief executive/managing director – Goodman Group Limited, and as a Director of its publicly listed associate companies 1976–1985
- Member Wellington Stock Exchange 1970–76 (Partner Harcourt Longuet & Co.)
- Non-executive director/deputy chairman – A.S.Paterson & Co. Limited 1968–1976
- Directorships at various times of companies engaged in wholesale and retail distribution, food processing, transport, tourism, banking, life insurance, manufacturing (plastics and textiles, agribusiness, telecommunications and airlines

=== Other organisations ===
- Young Enterprise Trust – trustee 2000–2008.
- Founding chairman, Enterprise Education Trust 2000–2003
- Australia & New Zealand Business Council 1985–2001 Chairman 1988–1990
- Samuel Marsden Collegiate School Board 1981–1987
- Manufacturing Development Council 1981–1984
- Wellington Rotary Club 1973–1977
- Wellington City Mission Board 1973–1995

Shirtcliffe was the founding chairman of the Enterprise Education Foundation and later a trustee of the Enterprise New Zealand Trust. He was an active member of the Royal New Zealand Naval Volunteer Reserve from 1953 to 1967, reaching the rank of Lieutenant Commander.

== Electoral reform ==
During the debate over electoral reform in New Zealand in the early 1990s, he led the Campaign for Better Government which unsuccessfully opposed the Mixed Member Proportional system. In the late 2000s, he campaigned for changes to the format of the 2011 referendum.

== Honours and awards ==
Shirtcliffe was appointed a Companion of the Order of St Michael and St George in the 1988 Queen's Birthday Honours, for services to marketing and business management. He received the New Zealand 1990 Commemoration Medal. In 2001, he was inducted into the New Zealand Business Hall of Fame. He is also a fellow of the New Zealand Institute of Chartered Accountants (honorary retired) and a Distinguished Fellow of the Institute of Directors.
