= Fao (god) =

Deity

In Niuean mythology, Fao is one of the five principal gods (tupua) of the island of Niue. He is the god of humans on Niue. According to Peniamina, a Pacific island missionary stationed on the island, the Niue islanders consider Huanaki and Fao as their ancestors, and are central to their early history.

There are several legends associated with Fao. Along with Huanaki, Fao was one of the earliest settlers, who swam across from Tonga. It is said that Fao started the creation of the island but was unable to complete it until the arrival of Huanaki. As one of the five tupua, he was said to have arrived on Niue beneath a pool on the reef near the base of the cliffs, and to have then "ascended to build a residence at Toga-liulu". Another legend states that Fao and the other tupua left Fonuagalo because they felt they had not been properly recognized at feasts. When they arrived in Niue, Fao was only able to place one of his feet on the ground. Huanaki completed Fao's work and the other three gods came to settle on the island.

A third legend states that these five gods were lazy and did no work toward preparing feasts. When their parents had prepared a feast, they received no portion of it because they had done nothing to help in its preparation. When they continued to do nothing in preparing feasts, their parents continued withholding any portion of it from them. The five gods then searched for an island where they could live away from their parents. A fourth legend, an account by the people of Avatele, says that the gods lived underground and did not feed their children because they were lazy. Their children were angry enough to come to the earth's surface. First was Fao, who tried and failed to make the tides go out. Another god surfaced and also tried to send the tides out. When he also failed at this, Huanaki came up; he and Fao were successful in making the tides go out, producing waves on the ocean.

== Bibliography ==
- Craig, Robert D. (1 January 1989). Dictionary of Polynesian Mythology. Greenwood Publishing Group. ISBN 978-0-313-25890-9.
- Loeb, Edwin Meyer (1926). History and Traditions of Niue. Vol. 32. The Museum. ISBN 9780527021351.
- Smith, S (1993). "Journal of the Polynesian Society, "The Traditions of Niue-Fekai", written by Pulekula, teacher at Tama-ha-le-leka, at Liku, October 1901, translation.". Niue The Island And Its People. editorips@usp.ac.fj. GGKEY:1ZG5T864FZB.
