= Alan Richards (cricketer) =

New Zealand cricketer and broadcaster

Alan Richards MBE
Personal information
- Full name: Geoffrey Alan Richards
- Born: 9 May 1922; Auckland, New Zealand
- Died: 27 December 2013 (aged 91); Auckland, New Zealand
- Source: Cricinfo, 8 March 2016

Geoffrey Alan Richards MBE (9 May 1922 – 27 December 2013) was a New Zealand cricketer and sports commentator.

Alan Richards played five first-class matches for Auckland in 1955–56, captaining the team in all of them, including the match against the touring West Indians, when he scored 53 and 30 not out. At the end of the season he began his radio career by describing New Zealand's first Test victory, at Eden Park in Auckland against West Indies. He became one of New Zealand's best-known radio sports commentators, covering four New Zealand cricket tours of England between 1973 and 1986, and was appointed a Member of the Order of the British Empire, for services to sport, in the 1988 Queen's Birthday Honours.

== See also ==
- List of Auckland representative cricketers
