= Alison Roxburgh =

New Zealand women's rights advocate (1934–2020)

Dame Alison Roxburgh DNZM CBE QSO JP
- Born: Alison Mary Cameron; 6 September 1934
- Died: 25 January 2020 (aged 85)
- Spouse: Jim Roxburgh
- Children: 1

Dame Alison Mary Roxburgh DNZM CBE QSO JP (née Cameron; 6 September 1934 – 25 January 2020) was a New Zealand women's rights advocate and community leader.

== Life ==
Roxburgh was born in Dunedin on 6 September 1934, and attended Columba College. She earned a Bachelor of Home Science at the University of Otago in 1955 and then attended Auckland Teachers' College. Roxburgh lectured and conducted research in nutrition at the University of Otago, Middlesex Hospital School of Clinical Research and the Flour Advisory Bureau in London, and at Victoria University of Wellington. From 1990 she was the national president of the National Council of Women of New Zealand.

== Honours and awards ==
In the 1986 New Year Honours, Roxburgh was appointed a Companion of the Queen's Service Order for public services, and in 1993 she received the New Zealand Suffrage Centennial Medal. In the 1995 New Year Honours, she was made a Commander of the Order of the British Empire, for services to women's affairs. She was appointed a Distinguished Companion of the New Zealand Order of Merit, for services to women's affairs and the community, in the 2003 Queen's Birthday Honours. Following the restoration of titular honours by the New Zealand government in 2009, Roxburgh accepted redesignation as a Dame Companion of the New Zealand Order of Merit.
