= Polynesian Society =

Nonprofit organization in Auckland, New Zealand

The Polynesian Society is a non-profit organisation based at the University of Auckland, New Zealand, dedicated to the scholarly study of the history, ethnography and mythology of Oceania.

== History ==
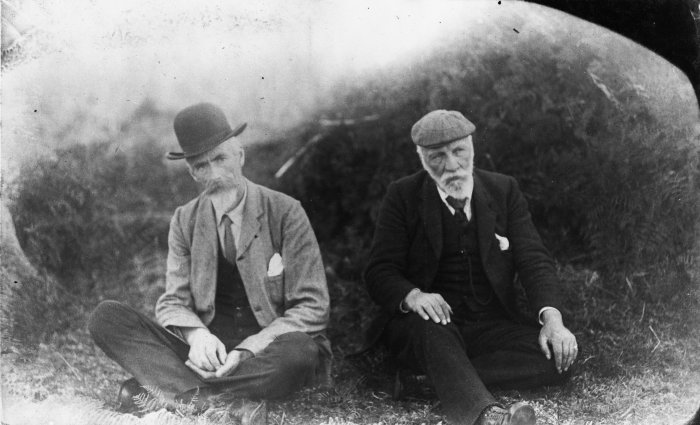
Elsdon Best and Percy Smith, 1908

The society was co-founded in 1892 by Percy Smith and Edward Tregear, largely in response to a conviction widely held at the time, that the Māori and other Polynesian peoples were a dying race. Smith and his friends hoped that it would help to preserve the traditional lore of the Māori before it disappeared and provide scholars with a forum for learned discussion of their ethnographic research (Byrnes 2006).

The initial membership of the society was 112, which had grown to 1,300 by 1965. Presidents have included bishops H. W. and W. L. Williams; James Pope, Edward Tregear, Percy Smith, Elsdon Best, William Skinner, Sir Āpirana Ngata, Harry Skinner, J. M. McEwen, Professor Sir Hugh Kawharu and Dame Joan Metge. The present president is Dr Richard Benton.

Until her death in 2006, the society's patron was the Māori Queen Te Arikinui Dame Te Ata-i-rangi-kaahu (1931–2006); Dame Te Ata was succeeded by the current patrons, Le Afioga Tuiatua Tupua Tamasese Efi, Head of State of Samoa, and Te Ariki Tumu Te Heuheu, Paramount Chief of Ngati Tuwharetoa.

== Publications ==
From its earliest days, the society published the quarterly Journal of the Polynesian Society, which became the society's principal means to publish information about the indigenous peoples of Polynesia, Melanesia, and Micronesia. The journal is a rich repository of the traditions of Oceania. Its first editors were S. Percy Smith and Edward Tregear. Smith was its chief contributor until his death in 1922. The list of subsequent editors includes W. H. Skinner, Elsdon Best, Johannes C. Andersen, H. D. Skinner, C. R. H. Taylor, W. R. Geddes, W. C. Groves, Bruce Biggs, Melvyn McLean and Richard Moyle. The present editors are Judith Huntsman and Melinda Allen. The journal since December 2022 has been renamed Waka Kuaka or “Flight of the Godwit” symbolising the objective of its refocusing on connections of shared culture between Pacific peoples –just as the godwit had been known among them as a mean of finding direction exploring and settling new islands– based on the ideas of Tongan anthropologist Epeli Hauʻofa.

In addition to this journal, the society has published many notable monographs, including S. Percy Smith's History and Traditions of the Taranaki Coast (1910) and The Lore of the Whare Wananga (1913–15); A. Shand's The Moriori People of the Chatham Islands (1911); Elsdon Best, The Maori (1924) and Tuhoe (1925); J. C. Andersen, Maori Music (1934); and C. R. H. Taylor, A Pacific Bibliography (1951), and two catalogues of the Oldman Collection of Māori and Polynesian artifacts (2004).

Other major works include A. Ngata and Pei Te Hurinui Jones Nga Moteatea (1959–1990), a definitive four-volume collection of traditional Māori song with translations and commentaries, which has been published in a new, enhanced edition by Auckland University Press in association with the Polynesian Society.

A history of the society and its journal, Keith Sorrenson's Manifest Duty: The Polynesian Society over 100 years, and a Centennial Index 1892–1991 (D. Brown, compiler) were published in 1991.

== See also ==
- Société des océanistes
