= George Shirtcliffe =

New Zealand businessman and politician (1862–1941)

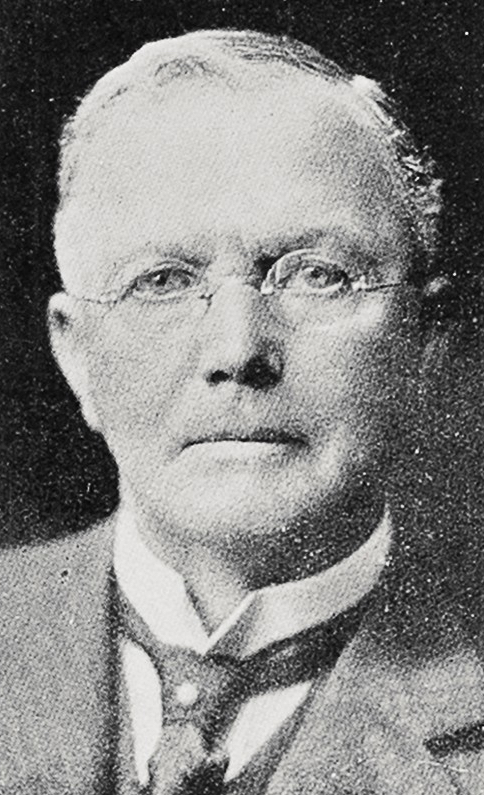
- George Shirtcliffe
- Born: 1862; Worksop, Nottinghamshire, United Kingdom
- Died: July 20, 1941 (aged 78–79); Wellington, New Zealand
- Occupation: Businessman
- Known for: Prominent member of the New Zealand business community
- Spouse: Jane Barbara Massey (m. 1889–1926) Margaret Elise Priest (m. 1927)
- Children: 7

Sir George Shirtcliffe KBE (1862 – 20 July 1941) was a New Zealand/British businessman and local council politician. He was a founding member and later vice-president of New Zealand Red Cross and sat on a number of government commissions. Shirtcliffe, who was married twice, died in 1941 and was survived by his second wife, two sons and three daughters.

== Early life and education ==
Shirtcliffe was born in 1862 at Worksop, Nottinghamshire, England the eldest son and third child of Caroline née Unwin and her husband John Shirtcliffe. His parents emigrated to New Zealand bringing his sisters Ellen Elizabeth and Frances Lewis with him on the emigrant ship Captain Cook which arrived at Lyttelton on 1 September 1863. They settled in Christchurch and six more children were added to the family.

He received his education at Riccarton School and later at Christ's College before beginning his career in business as a cadet at the Timaru office of the Government Land Office in 1877. After one year he joined the National Mortgage and Agency Company as a junior until 1880 when he was appointed as an accountant. In 1882, he was attained a position as an accountant for the Canterbury Farmers' Co-operative Association and was promoted to be its manager in 1884.

== Career ==
He became a partner in, and manager of, the import and export firm A. S. Paterson and Co., Ltd. in Dunedin in 1890. He was managing director of the firm from 1912 to 1919 and in 1927 was appointed chairman of directors until he retired due to health.

He was a member of the Wellington Chamber of Commerce including serving as president of the chamber's council from 1904 to 1907, and one of its four life members. From 1906 to 1908, he was representative of the Chamber of Commerce on the Wellington Harbour Board. He was also a member of the original executive of the Wellington branch of the Navy League of New Zealand He was a foundation member (and later vice-president) of New Zealand Red Cross. He was a member of the executive of the War Relief Association of Wellington from 1915 until 1934, when indifferent health necessitated his retirement.

At the 1907 local elections Shirtcliffe was elected to the Wellington City Council on the Citizens League ticket. He was re-elected for two further terms until 1913 when he did not seek re-election.

He was also a member of multiple government commissions, including the 1921 Hospital Commission, the 1922 and 1924 Taxation Commissions, the 1931 Hawke's Bay Rehabilitation Committee, the 1932 National Expenditure Commission (of which he was the chairman of) and was chairman of the Council of Scientific and Industrial Research until retiring from the position in 1935.

He was well-known for philanthropy such as endowing £20,000 to the University of New Zealand, to establish a fund for scholarship, and donating many works of art to the National Art Gallery. He gave £5,000 to the city in 1926 in order to build a children's playground in Wellington and was a frequent donor to the Anglican Church in Wellington.

== Honours ==
At the 1919 Birthday Honours he was appointed an Officer of the Order of the British Empire for services in connection with the New Zealand Branch of the British Red Cross Society and Order of St. John of Jerusalem. He was knighted as a Knight Commander of the Order of the British Empire for public services in the 1936 New Year Honours.

== Personal life ==
Shirtcliffe married Jane Barbara Massey in Timaru on 30 January 1889. She raised their seven children before she died in 1926 though one of the seven, a twin, died as an infant. He remarried Margaret Elise Priest the following year.
