= 1936 New Year Honours =

British royal recognitions

The 1936 New Year Honours were appointments by King George V to various orders and honours to reward and highlight good works by citizens of the United Kingdom and British Empire. They were announced on 31 December 1935.

The recipients of honours are displayed here as they were styled before their new honour, and arranged by honour, with classes (Knight, Knight Grand Cross, etc.) and then divisions (Military, Civil, etc.) as appropriate.

== United Kingdom and British Empire ==
=== Viscount ===
- The Right Honourable Ernest Murray, Baron Hanworth KBE Lately Master of the Rolls.
- Marshal of the Royal Air Force Hugh Montague, Baron Trenchard GCB GCVO DSO DCL Lately Commissioner of Metropolitan Police.

=== Baron ===
- Sir Arthur Shirley Benn Bt KBE Member of Parliament for the Drake Division of Plymouth, 1910–29, and for the Park Division of Sheffield, 1931-35. For political and public services.
- Sir James Gomer Berry Bt JP For political and public services.
- Sir Thomas Sivewright Catto Bt CBE For public services.
- The Right Honourable Sir Ian Macpherson Bt KC JP MP Member of Parliament for Ross and Cromarty since 1911. Under-Secretary of State for War 1916-19. Chief Secretary for Ireland, 1918-20. Minister of Pensions, 1920-22. For political and public services.

=== Privy Councillor ===
The King appointed the following to His Majesty's Most Honourable Privy Council:

- Nawab Sir Muhammad Akbar Nazar Ali Hydari Finance and Railway Member of the Executive Council of Hyderabad State. Delegate of His Exalted Highness the Nizam of Hyderabad at the Indian Round Table Conferences and at the Joint Committee on Indian Constitutional Reform.
- The Honourable Sir George Edward Rich KCMG Senior Puisne Judge of the High Court of Australia.

=== Baronetcies ===
- Sir Park Goff KC JP Member of Parliament for the Cleveland Division, 1918–23 and 1924–29; and for the Chatham Division, 1931-35. For political and public services.
- Captain Sir Connop Thirlwall Robert Guthrie KBE For political and public services.
- Francis Norie-Miller JP For political and public services in the County of Perth.
- David Douglas Reid JP DL MP Member of Parliament for East Down, 1918–22, and for County Down since 1922. For political and public services.

=== Knight Bachelor ===
- Alderman Robert Noton Barclay JP For public and philanthropic services in Manchester.
- Thomas Biggart, Formerly Secretary of the Shipbuilding and of the Engineering Employers Federations.
- James Blindell JP MP Member of Parliament for Holland-with-Boston, since 1929. A Lord Commissioner of the Treasury, since 1932.
- Lieutenant-Colonel Norman Seddon-Brown TD JP For political and public services in Lancashire.
- Percy Carter Buck FRCM King Edward Professor of Music in the University of London. Musical Adviser to the London Council.
- Howard Stransom Button JP Chairman of the Middlesex County Council.
- Reginald George Clarry MP Member of Parliament for Newport, 1922 to 1929 and since 1931. For political and public services.
- Ralph Cope, Chief Accountant, Great Western Railway Company. On the occasion of the centenary of the Railway.
- James Fraser Cunningham OBE JP For political and public services in Scotland.
- Colonel Bertram Joseph Tottey Ford DL For public and philanthropic services in Birmingham.
- Ioan Gwilym Gibbon CB CBE Director of the Local Government Division, Ministry of Health.
- Patrick Joseph Henry Hannon MP Member of Parliament for the Moseley division of Birmingham since 1921. For political and public services.
- Professor Arthur Harden FRS Emeritus Professor of Biochemistry, London University.
- Walter Ernest Hargreaves. For services in advising Government Departments, especially in connection with marine insurance.
- Hector James Wright Hetherington Vice-Chancellor of Liverpool University.
- Walter St. David Jenkins CB CBE Director of Contracts, Admiralty.
- Alderman Ernest Henry Kemp JP For political and public services in Woolwich.
- Alderman Charles William Melhuish JP For political and public services in Cardiff.
- Frank Mellor, Chief Registrar in Bankruptcy, Supreme Court of Judicature.
- Humphrey Sumner Milford Publisher to the University of Oxford.
- George Gibson Mitcheson MP Member of Parliament for St. Pancras, S.W., since 1931. For political and public services.
- James Norval JP Chairman of the Scottish National Housing Company, Limited, and of the Scottish National Housing and Town Planning Council.
- Charles John Pain. For political and public services in Nottingham.
- Ernest Sanger JP For political and public services in St. Marylebone.
- Edward John Scarles OBE Chief Inspector, Board of Customs and Excise.
- Lieutenant Colonel Francis Claude Shelmerdine CIE OBE FRAeS Director-General of Civil Aviation, Air Ministry.
- Alderman William Joseph Pearman-Smith JP For public services in the Borough of Walsall.
- Alderman Francis William Terry. For political and public services in York.
- George Tilley. For political and public services.
- John Train JP MP Member of Parliament for the Cathcart Division of Glasgow since 1929. For political and public services.
- Lionel Ashton Piers Warner CBE JP General Manager and Secretary, Mersey Docks and Harbour Board.
- Owen William Wightman CBE JP For political and public services in Hertfordshire.
- David Percival Dalbreck Wilkie OBE FRCSE FRCS Professor of Surgery at Edinburgh University, Member of the Medical Research Council.
- Professor Alfred E. Zimmern. For political and public services.

Colonies, Protectorates, etc.

- Sidney Solomon Abrahams, Colonial Legal Service, Chief Justice, Tanganyika Territory.
- Walter Randolph Carpenter. For philanthropic services in the Commonwealth of Australia.
- Edward Sheldon Cunningham For public services in the Commonwealth of Australia.
- Hugh Berchmans Devine FRACS For services to surgery in the State of Victoria.
- James Hutchison. For public services in the Dominion of New Zealand.
- Major Francis Walter Fitton Jackson CMG DSO RA Colonial Administrative Service, Chief Commissioner, Ashanti, Gold Coast.
- George Johnson. For public services in Southern Rhodesia.
- James Peter Obeyesekere. For public services in Ceylon.
- Lennox Arthur Patrick O'Reilly. For public services in Trinidad.
- Herbert Angas Parsons Puisne judge, Supreme Court, State of South Australia.
- Philip Bertie Petrides, Colonial Legal Service, Chief Justice of MauritiusChief Judge, Mauritius.
- The Honourable Arthur King Trethowan. For public services in the State of New South Wales.

British India

- Justice Gilbert Stone, Chief Justice-designate of the High Court of Judicature at Nagpur, Central Provinces.
- Khan Bahadur Nawab Kazi Golam Mohiuddin Faroqui, Minister for Agriculture, Industries and Public Works to the Governor of Bengal, Bengal.
- Justice Mutta Venkatasubba Rao, Puisne Judge of the High Court of Judicature at Fort St. George, Madras.
- Bryce Chudleigh Burt CIE MBE FCS Indian Agricultural Service, Agricultural Expert to the Imperial Council of Agricultural Research.
- Jyotsna Nath Ghosal CSI CIE Indian Civil Service (retired), Member and Government Whip, Council of State.
- Muhammad Yamin Khan CIE MLA Landowner, United Provinces.
- Colonel Charles Isherwood Brierley CIE Indian Medical Service (retired), lately Inspector-General of Civil Hospitals and Jails, North-West Frontier Province.
- John Murray Ewart CIE Indian Police, Inspector-General of Police, Punjab.
- William Rutton Searle Sharpe, lately Chairman, Bombay Port Trust, Bombay.
- Sahibji Maharaj Anand Sarup, Founder of Dayalbagh, Agra, United Provinces.
- George Riddoch Campbell, Partner, Messrs. Mackinnon Mackenzie & Co., Calcutta, Bengal.
- Alwyn Ezra, Director, Messrs, Bassoon J. David & Co., Ltd., Bombay.
- Kenneth Brand Harper, General Manager, Burma Oil Company, Rangoon, Burma.
- Tracy Gavin-Jones, Director, Muir Mills Company, Cawnpore, United Provinces.
- William Lamond, Managing Director, Imperial Bank of India, Bombay.
- Mangaldas Vijbhukandas Mehta OBE MRCP FRCP Medical Practitioner, Bombay.
- Rai Bahadur Seray Mai Bapna CIE Prime Minister to His Highness the Maharaja Holkar of Indore, Central India.
- Francis Edward Earle Villiers, formerly President of the European Association, India, and Vice-Chairman of the Union of Britain and India.

=== The Most Honourable Order of the Bath ===
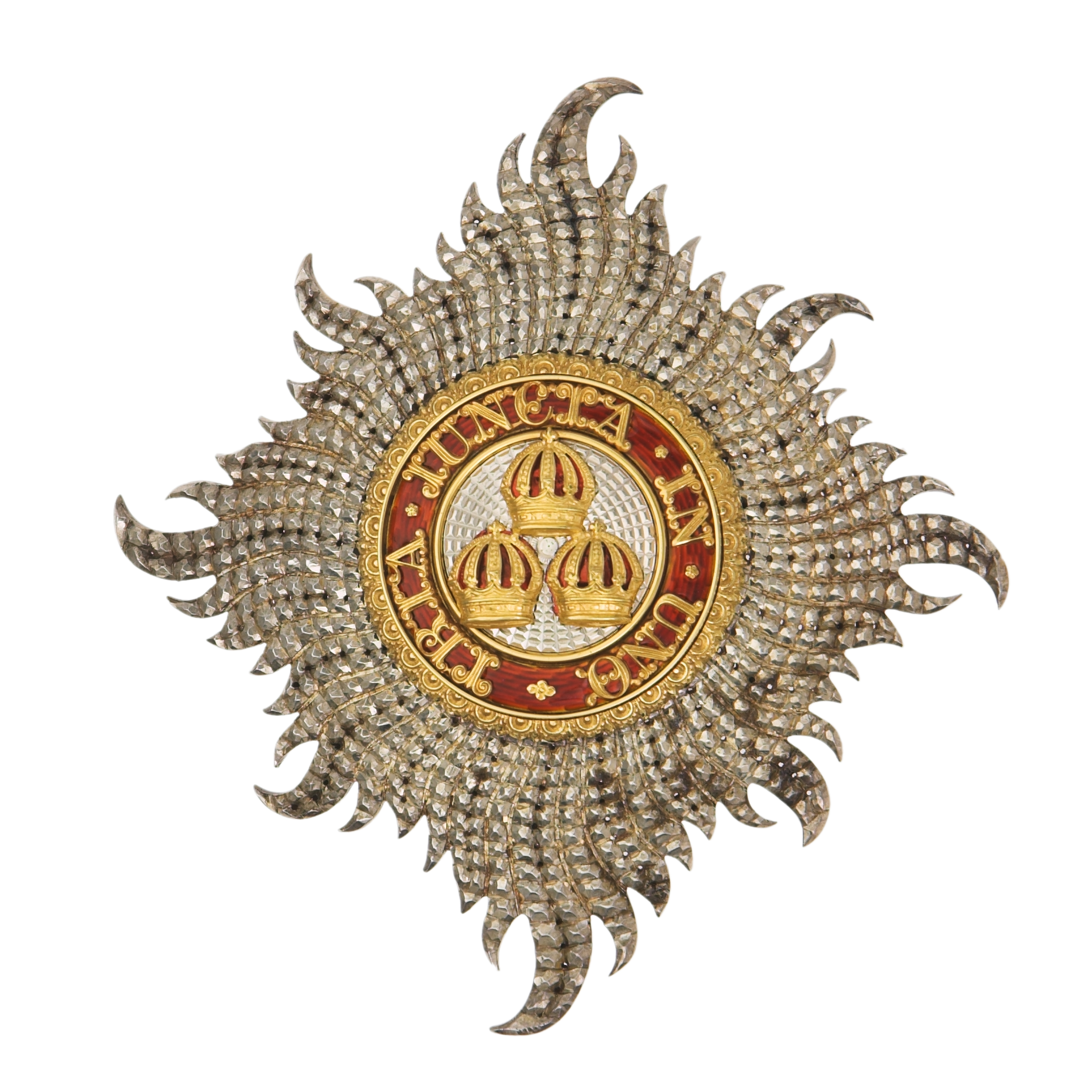
Civilian star of the Knight Grand Cross of the Order of the Bath

==== Knight Commander of the Order of the Bath (KCB) ====
Military Division
Royal Navy

- Vice-Admiral William Milbourne James CB
- Vice-Admiral Reginald Guy Hannam Henderson CB
- Paymaster Rear-Admiral Henry William Woodward CB

Army

- Lieutenant General Edward Thomas Humphreys CB CMG DSO (late The Lancashire Fusiliers, and The Prince of Wales's Leinster Regiment (Royal Canadians)), Half-pay.
- Lieutenant-General Walter William Pitt-Taylor CB CMG DSO (late The Rifle Brigade (Prince Consort's Own)), General Officer Commanding-in-Chief, Western Command, India (Officiating).
- Lieutenant-General Reginald John Thoroton Hildyard CB CMG DSO (late The Queen's Own Royal West Kent Regiment), Half-pay, Governor and Commander-in-Chief, Bermuda, designate.

Royal Air Force

- Air-Marshal Frederick William Bowhill CB CMG DSO
- Air-Marshal Charles Stuart Burnett CB CBE DSO

Civil Division

- Honorary Colonel George Ralph Charles, Baron Harlech CB TD Chairman, Territorial Army Association of the County of Salop.
- Sir Thomas Williams Phillips KBE CB Permanent Secretary, Ministry of Labour.

==== Companion of the Order of the Bath (CB) ====
Military Division
Royal Navy

- Rear-Admiral Thomas Hugh Binney DSO
- Rear-Admiral Thomas Frederick Parker Calvert CVO DSO
- Rear-Admiral James Andrew Gardiner Troup.

Army

- Major-General FitzGerald Gabbett FitzGerald DSO (late Royal Army Medical Corps) Honorary Surgeon to The King, Deputy Director of Medical Services, Eastern Command.
- Major-General William Norman Herbert CMG DSO Colonel, The Royal Northumberland Fusiliers, Commander, 50th (Northumbrian) Division, Northern Command.
- Major-General Wellesley Douglas Studholme Brownrigg DSO (late The Sherwood Foresters (Nottinghamshire and Derbyshire Regiment)), Commander, 51st (Highland) Division, Scottish Command.
- Major-General Bernard Cyril Freyberg VC CMG DSO (late The Queen's Royal Regiment (West Surrey), Grenadier Guards, and The Manchester Regiment) Half-pay.
- Major-General James Murray Robert Harrison DSO (late Royal Artillery) Major-Gerieral, Royal Artillery, Headquarters (Staff of the Army in India.
- Major-General Reginald Henry Dalrymple Tompson CMG DSO (late Royal Artillery), Commander, Air Defence Formations, Territorial Army.
- Major-General Frederick Wilmot Barron OBE (late Royal Artillery), inspector of Fixed Defences, The War Office.
- Major-General George Charles Kelly DSO (late The King's Royal Rifle Corps, and The Prince of Wales's Volunteers (South Lancashire Regiment)), Commander, 49th (West Riding) Division, Northern Command.
- Major-General Stephen Seymour Butler CMG DSO (late The Royal Warwickshire Regiment, and The South Staffordshire Regiment), Commander, 48th (South Midland) Division, Southern Command.
- Colonel (temporary Brigadier) Arthur Ingram Musson, Royal Army Pay Corps, Chief Paymaster, The War Office, and Officer in charge of Records Royal Army Pay Corps.
- Colonel (temporary Brigadier) James Charles McKenna DSO Indian Army Commander, Zhob (Independent) Brigade Area, Western Command, India.
- Colonel (honorary Brigadier) John Cunliffe Gretton, retired, late Indian Army, late Commander, Lahore Brigade Area, Northern Command, India.
- Colonel (temporary Brigadier) Leonard Sueton Hirsch Smithers, Indian Army, Commander, 11th (Ahmednagar) Infantry Brigade, Southern Command, India.
- Colonel (temporary Brigadier) Alan Fleming Hartley DSO Indian Army, Director of Military Operations, Headquarters Staff of the Army in India.

Royal Air Force

- Air Vice-Marshal Henry Meyrick Cave-Browne-Cave DSO DFC
- Air Commodore Napier John Gill CBE MC

Civil Division

- Rear-Admiral Robert Clutterbuck Davenport.
- Rear-Admiral George Hamilton D'Oyly Lyon.
- Engineer Rear-Admiral William Jordan Deans.
- Athol Lancelot Anderson MICE
- Colonel William Anderson DSO MC TD DL Aid-de-Camp to The King, Territorial Army.
- Colonel Edward William Home CMG CBE Chairman, Territorial Army Association of the County of Caithness.
- Colonel James Lewis Sleeman CMG CBE MVO Territorial Army.
- Albert Humphries OBE MInstCE MIMechE , late Chief Mechanical Engineer; and Superintendent, Building Works, Engineering Department, Royal Arsenal, Woolwich.
- Harold William Cole CBE Deputy Under-Secretary for Mines.
- Austin Earl CBE Assistant Under-Secretary of State, War Office.
- Cadwaladr Bryner Jones CBE Welsh Secretary, Ministry, of Agriculture and Fisheries.
- Alfred Theodore Vaughan Robinson CBE Deputy Secretary, Ministry of Transport.
- Orme Garton Sargent CMG Assistant Under-Secretary of State, Foreign Office.
- Charles Lancelot Stocks, Permanent Commissioner of Crown Lands, and Secretary, Office of the Commissioners.
- Edward Cliffe Vigors, Principal Clerk of Private Bills and Private Committees, House of Lords; and Examiner of Standing Orders of the House of Lords and House of Commons.

=== The Most Exalted Order of the Star of India ===
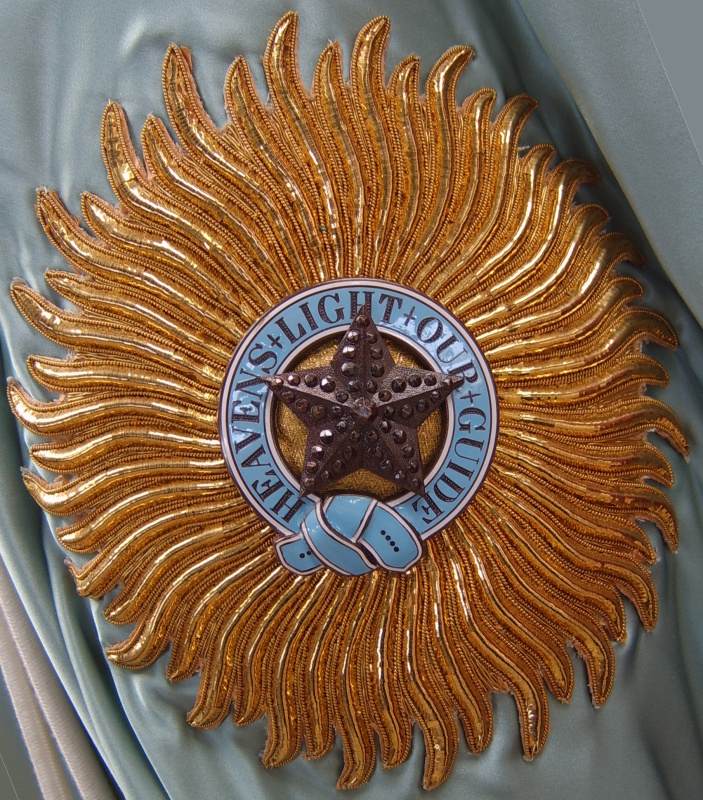
Star of a Knight Grand Commander of the Most Exalted Order of the Star of India

==== Knight Commander (KCSI) ====
- Captain His Highness Ali Jah, Farzand-i-Dilpazir-i- Daulat-i-Inglishia, Mukhlis ud-Daula, Nasir ul-Mulk, Amir ul-Umara, Nawab Sayyid Muhammad Raza Ali Khan Bahadur, Mustaid Jang, Nawab of Rampur, United Provinces.
- Sir Nripendra Nath Sircar, Member of the Governor-General's Executive Council.
- Sir Percy James Grigg KCB Member of the Governor-General's Executive Council.
- Captain His Highness Maharana Shri Sir Amarsinhji Banesinhji KCIE Maharana Raj Sahib of Wankaner, States of Western India.
- Sir Reginald Isidore Robert Glancy KCIE CSI Indian Civil Service (retired), Member of the Council of India.
- Sir Maneckji Byramji Dadabhoy KCIE President of the Council of State.

Honorary Knight Commander

- General Sir Padma Shumshere Jung Bahadur Rana CBE KCIE Commander-in-Chief, Nepal.

==== Companion (CSI) ====
- George Richard Frederick Tottenham CIE Indian Civil Service, Secretary to the Government of India in the Army Department.
- Tennant Sloan CIE Indian Civil Service, Joint Secretary to the Government of India in the Home Department.
- Cecil Fabian Brackenbury, Indian Civil Service, Chief Secretary to the Government of Madras.
- Walter Booth-Gravely CIE Indian Civil Service, Chief Secretary to the Government of Burma.
- Edward Ellis Turner, Indian Police, Inspector-General of Police, Bombay Presidency.
- William Hugh Thompson MLC Director, Bengal Telephone Corporation, Limited, Calcutta, Bengal.

=== Order of Merit (OM) ===
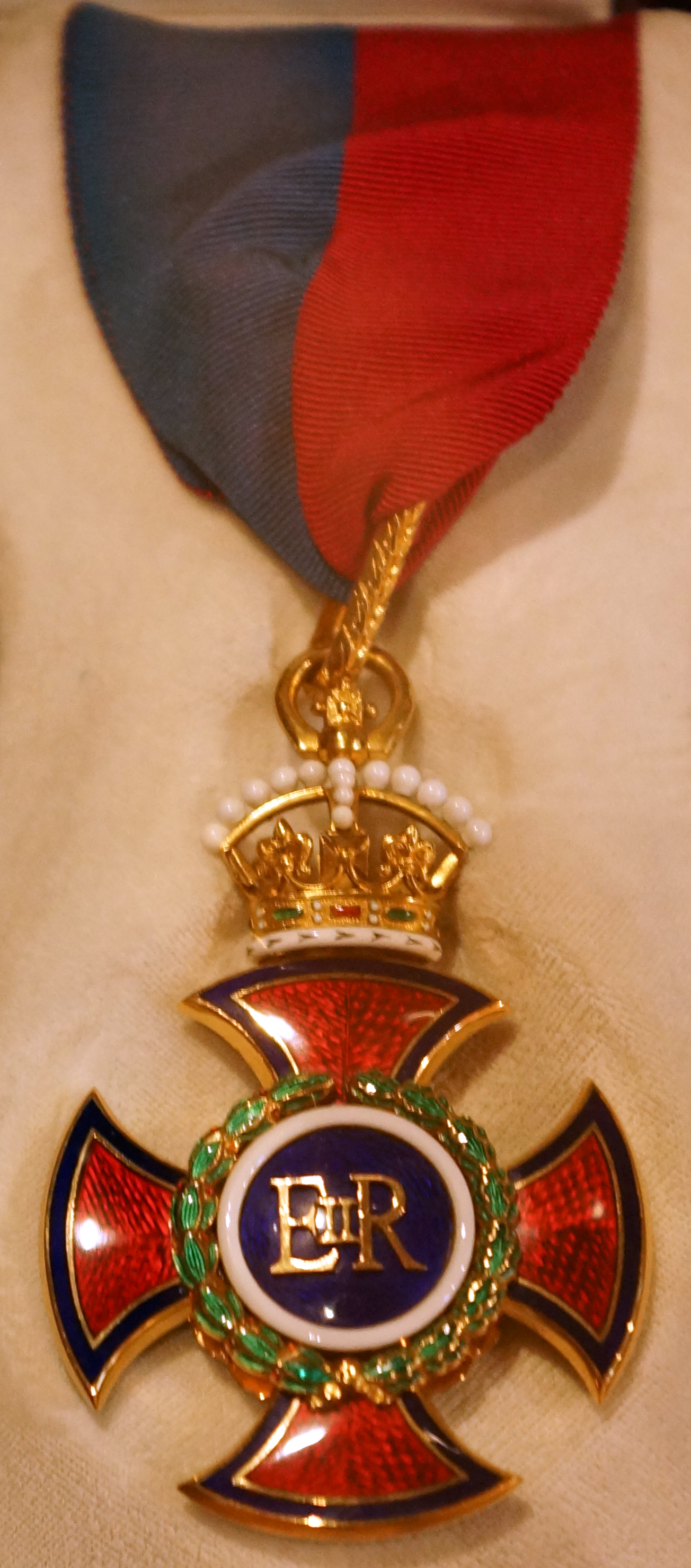
The riband and badge of the Order of Merit

- Field-Marshal Sir Philip Walhouse Chetwode Bt GCB GCSI KCMG DSO In recognition of distinguished services rendered to his country.

=== The Most Distinguished Order of Saint Michael and Saint George ===
Star of the Order of Saint Michael and Saint George.

==== Knight Grand Cross of the Order of St Michael and St George (GCMG) ====
- The Right Honourable Sir Robert Henry Clive KCMG His Majesty's Ambassador Extraordinary and Plenipotentiary at Tokyo.

==== Knight Commander of the Order of St Michael and St George (KCMG) ====
- The Honourable Frederick Richard Jordan, Chief Justice, State of New South Wales.
- Alan Cuthbert Maxwell Burns CMG Governor and Commander-in-Chief of the Colony of British Honduras.
- Henry Grattan Bushe CB CMG Legal Adviser to the Secretary of State for Dominion Affairs and to the Secretary of State for the Colonies.
- Sir Harold Baxter Kittermaster KBE CMG Governor and Commander-in-Chief of the Nyasaland Protectorate.
- Gordon James Lethem CMG Governor and Commander-in-Chief of the Colony of Seychelles, and Governor and Commander-in-Chief designate of the Leeward Islands.
- Ronald Hugh Campbell CMG His Majesty's Envoy Extraordinary and Minister Plenipotentiary at Belgrade.
- Hughe Montgomery Knatchbull-Hugessen CMG His Majesty's Envoy Extraordinary and Minister Plenipotentiary at Tehran.

==== Companion of the Order of St Michael and St George (CMG) ====
- Colonel Arthur Murray Cudmore FRCS LRCP Consulting Surgeon of the Australian Army Medical Corps Reserve, Fourth Military District, State of South Australia.
- Willi Fels. For services to ethnology in the Dominion of New Zealand.
- Cecil Albert Jeffery, Clerk of the Executive Council and (Secretary to the Cabinet, Dominion of New Zealand.
- Robert Bond Wesley McComas. For public services in the Commonwealth of Australia.
- John Spence, Auditor General, State of New South Wales.
- Harold Tuckwell Allen, Assistant Secretary, Colonial Office.
- Arthur Chapman Barnes, Colonial Agricultural Service, Director of Agriculture, Jamaica.
- Humphrey Ernest Bowman CBE Director of Education, Palestine.
- Rupert Briercliffe OBE MRCP Colonial Medical Service, Director of Medical and Sanitary Services, Ceylon.
- Geoffrey Edmund Cator, Colonial Administrative Service, British Resident, Perak, Federated Malay States.
- George Tyrrell McCaw OBE Civil Assistant, War Office. For services in connection with surveys in the Colonies.
- Harold Robert Montgomery, Colonial Administrative Service, Chief Native Commissioner, Kenya.
- Walter Morgan, Colonial Administrative Service, Senior Resident, Nigeria.
- William Nowell CBE Colonial Agricultural Service, Director, East African Agricultural Research Station.
- Joseph Wiseman Keogh OBE His Majesty's Consul at Nice.
- Reginald Wildig Allen Leeper CBE Counsellor in the Foreign Office.
- Richard Lysle Nosworthy, Commercial Counsellor at His Majesty's Embassy in Rome.

Honorary Companions

- Ungku Abdul, Aziz bin Abdul Majid, Dato Menteri Besar, Johore, Malay States.
- His Highness Tunku Badlishah ibni Sultan Abdul Hamid Halim Shah, Raja Muda of Kedah, Malay States.

=== Order of the Indian Empire ===
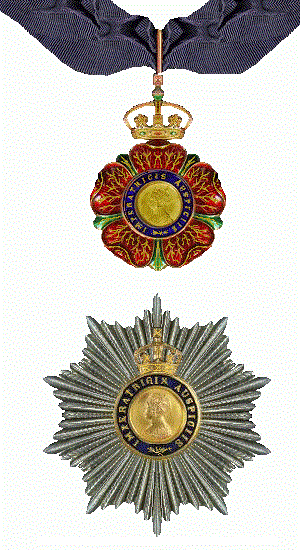
Riband, badge and star of the Knight Grand Commander of the Order of the Indian Empire

==== Knight Grand Commander (GCIE) ====
- Captain His Highness Beglar Begi Mir Ahmad Yar Khan, Khan of Kalat, Baluchistan.
- Sir Hugh Lansdown Stephenson KCSI KCIE Governor of Burma.

==== Knight Commander (KCIE) ====
- His Highness Raja Dileep Singh, Raja of Sailana, Central India.
- Robert Niel Reid CSI CIE Indian Civil Service, Member of the Executive Council of the Governor of Bengal.
- Charles Alexander Souter CSI Indian, Civil Service, Member of the Executive Council of the Governor of Madras.
- Donald James Boyd CIE Indian Civil Service, Member of the Executive Council of the Governor of the Punjab.
- Lieutenant Colonel George Drummond Ogilvie CSI CIE of the Political Department, Agent to the Governor-General in Rajputana.
- Herbert Aubrey Francis Metcalfe CSI CIE MVO of the Political Department, Foreign Secretary to the Government of India in the Foreign and Political Department.
- David George Mitchell CSI CIE Indian Civil Service, Secretary to the Government of India in the Department of Industries and Labour.
- Eric Charles Miéville CSI CMG Secretary to the Executive Council of the Governor-General and Private Secretary to the Viceroy.
- Sir Hubert Winch Carr, formerly President of the European Association, India.
- Sir Mirza Mahomed Ismail CIE OBE Dewan of Mysore State.
- M. R. Ry. Rao Bahadur Sir Vangal Thiruvankata Krishnama Acharya Avargal CIE Dewan of Baroda State.

==== Companion (CIE) ====
- John Bartley, Indian Civil Service, Joint Secretary to the Government of India in the Legislative Department.
- William Walker Nind, Imperial Customs Service, Officiating Member, Central Board of Revenue.
- Charles Kenneth Rhodes, Indian Civil Service, Joint Secretary to the Government of India in the Reforms Office.
- Satyendra Chandra Ghosh Maulik, Member of the Council of State Zamindar, Bengal.
- Colonel (temporary Brigadier) Frederick Dickins, Indian Army, Director of Ordnance Services, Master-General of the Ordnance Branch, Army Headquarters, India.
- Alan Alexander McCaskill Mitchell, Indian Civil Service, Commissioner, Lahore Division, Punjab.
- Edmund Plunkett Burke, Indian Service of Engineers, Chief Engineer and Secretary to the Government of Assam in the Public Works Department, Assam.
- Philip Theodore Mansfield, Indian Civil Service, Secretary to the Government of Bihar and Orissa in the Reforms Department, Bihar and Orissa.
- Lieutenant-Colonel Henry Francis William Paterson, Indian Army (Cantonments. Department), lately Director of Military Lands and Cantonments.
- Bobert George Allan, Indian Agricultural Service, Director of Agriculture, United Provinces.
- Henry Armroid Hyde MC Indian Service of Engineers, Chief Engineer, Public Works Department (Buildings and Roads and Irrigation Branches), Central Provinces.
- William Edward Gustave Bender MBE VD MICE Chief Engineer, Bengal and North-Western Railway and Rohilkhund and Kumaon Railway, Bihar and Orissa.
- Siddheswari Prasad Varma, Indian Audit and Accounts Service, Financial Adviser, Posts and Telegraphs.
- Lieutenant-Colonel Macleod Wylie, Indian Army (retired), recently Recruiting Officer for Gurkhas.
- Herbert Patrick Victor Townend, Indian Civil Service, Rural Development Commissioner, Bengal.
- Lieutenant-Colonel Guy Willoughby Anderson, Indian Army, Commandant, Zhob Militia, Baluchistan.
- Cecil Douglas Rae OBE Post and Telegraphs Department, Postmaster-General, Bombay.
- Lieutenant-Colonel William Ross Stewart Indian Medical Service, Surgeon to the Viceroy.
- Claude Cavendish Inglis, Indian Service of Engineers, Superintending Engineer, Deccan Irrigation Circle, Bombay.
- Ernest Alfred Wraight MIMM FIC Indian Stores Department, Metallurgical Inspector, Jamshedpur.
- Arthur Henry Ashworth Todd, Indian Civil Service, Collector of Chingleput and Madras, Madras.
- Major Robert Stivala AspinalI Indian Medical Service, Civil Surgeon, Ajmer-Merwara, and Chief Medical Officer, Rajputiana.
- Herbert Dippie, D S.O., Indian Educational Service, Special Officer in charge of primary education and the education of girls, Bihar and Orissa.
- Alec Aikman, Senior Deputy Chairman, Messrs. Andrew Yule & Co., Ltd., Calcutta, Bengal.
- James Cairns OBE Chief Medical and Health Officer, North-Western Railway, Punjab.
- Alfred Axen Leonard Flynn VD Traffic Manager, Karachi Port Trust, Bombay.
- James William Gordon OBE Manager Jodhpur State Railway, Rajputana.
- Vernon Foxwell Gray, Director of Messrs. R. J. Wood & Co., Ltd., Delhi.
- Harry William Hogg OBE Provincial Secretary, The Boy Scouts Association, Punjab.
- Raja Indarjit Pratab Bahadur Sahi, of Tamkohi, Gorakhpur, United Provinces.
- Rai Bahadur Lala Jai Gopal Puri, Colonisation Minister, Bikaner State, Rajputana.
- U Kyaw Zan, Mayor of Rangoon, Burma.
- Honorary Captain Maharaj Naharsinhji, Lieutenant-Colonel and Chief Commandant, Baria State Forces, Gujarat States.
- M. R. Ry. Sami Muthiah Mudaliyar Avargal, Chairman, Delimitation Committee, Madras.

=== The Royal Victorian Chain ===
- His Royal Highness The Duke of Kent KG KT GCMG GCVO

=== The Royal Victorian Order ===
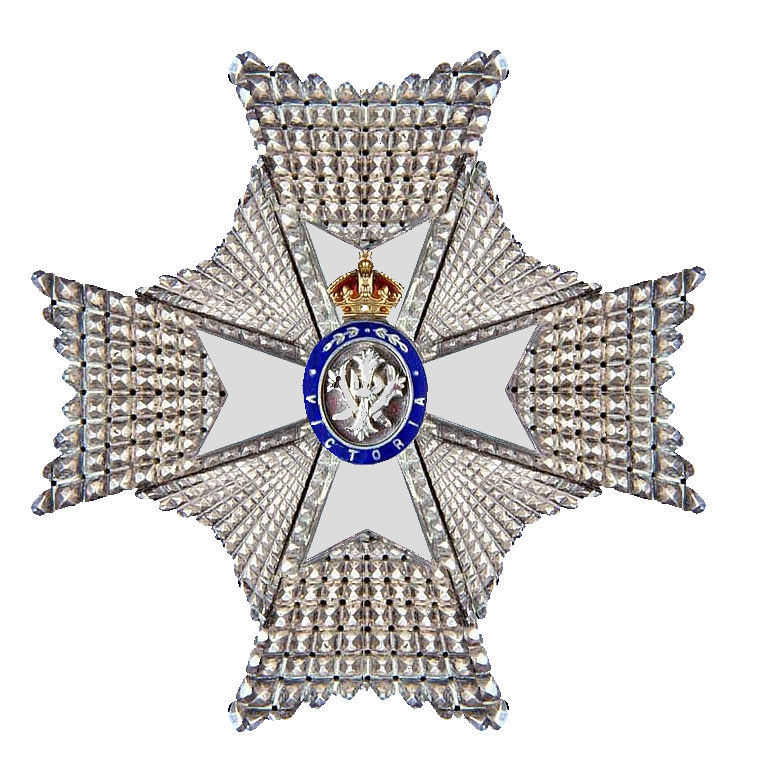
Insignia of a Knight / Dames Commander of the Royal Victorian Order

==== Knight Grand Cross of the Royal Victorian Order (GCVO) ====
- Colonel Walter John, Duke of Buccleuch and Queensberry. (Dated 26 November 1935).
- Lieutenant-General Sir Alfred Edward Codrington KCB KCVO
- Sir Harry Lloyd-Verney KCVO

==== Knight Commander of the Royal Victorian Order (KCVO) ====
- The Reverend Prebendary Launcelot Jefferson Percival CVO
- Colonel Sir James Milne CSI
- Louis Francis Roebuck Knuthsen CVO OBE
- Henry Lennox Hopkinson.

==== Commander of the Royal Victorian Order (CVO) ====
- Howell Gwynne-Jones (Dated 12 December 1935.)
- Major Henry Hudson Fraser Stockley MVO OBE
- John Wilson Paterson MVO MBE
- Arthur Clement Beck MVO
- William Gilliatt
- Francis Desmond Donovan.
- Stanley Samuel Greenfield.

==== Member of the Royal Victorian Order, 4th class (MVO) ====
- Lieutenant-Commander Stuart Austen Buss RN (Dated 11 August 1935.)
- Commander Leicester Charles Assheton St. John Curzon-Howe RN (Dated 12 August 1935.)
- Paymaster Commander Ernest Dudley Gordon Colles OBE RN (retired).
- Frank Eckersley OBE
- Edward Wyndham Monkhouse MVO (Fifth Class).
- Austin Harry Lester Hertslet MVO (Fifth Class).
- George David Field MVO (Fifth Class).
- James Lamb

==== Member of the Royal Victorian Order, 5th class (MVO) ====
- Francis Augustus Mason (Dated 13 August 1935.)
- Major George John Miller MBE Grenadier Guards.
- Paymaster Lieutenant William Henry Samways MBE RN (retired).
- Bertram Pearson Murray.
- Ralph Cyril Isard.

=== The Most Excellent Order of the British Empire ===
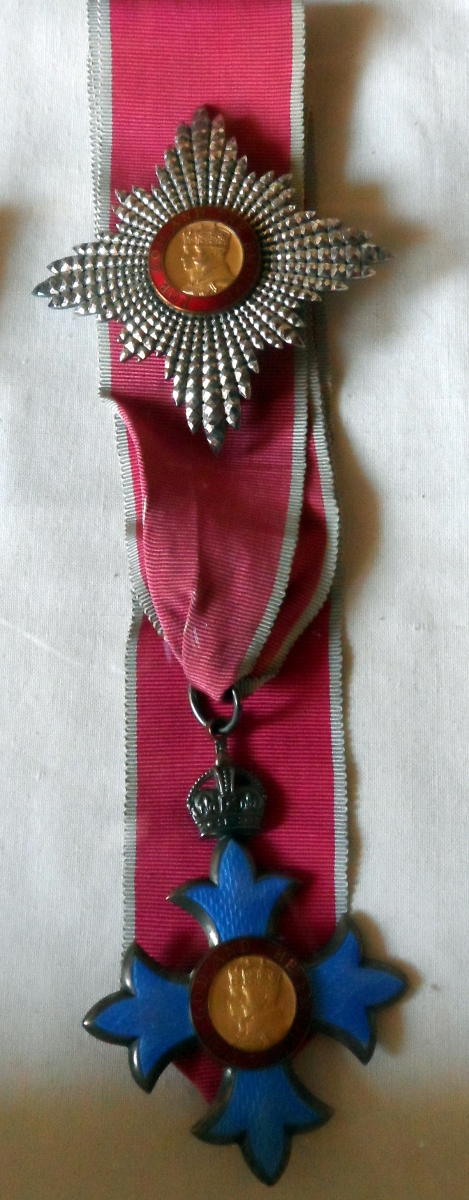
Insignia of a Knight Commander of the Order of the British Empire

==== Knight Grand Cross of the Order of the British Empire (GBE) ====
Civilian Division
Diplomatic Service and Overseas List

- Sir Sidney Barton KCVO KBE CMG His Majesty's Envoy Extraordinary and Minister Plenipotentiary at Addis Ababa.

==== Dame Commander of the Order of the British Empire (DBE) ====
- Rosalind Cecilia Caroline, Duchess of Abercorn. For public services in Northern Ireland.
- Christabel Pankhurst. For public and social services.

==== Knight Commander of the Order of the British Empire (KBE) ====
Military Division

Army

- Major-General Evan Gibb CB CMG CBE DSO Retired Pay, Colonel Commandant, Royal Army Service Corps.

Civil Division

- George Joseph Ball OBE Director of the Conservative Research Department since its inception. For political and public services.
- Thomas Robert Gardiner, Deputy Director General, General Post Office.

Diplomatic Service and Overseas List

- Alexander William Keown-Boyd CMG CBE Director-General, European Department, Ministry of the Interior, Egyptian Government.

Colonies, Protectorates, etc.

- Charles Wellington Connibere. For philanthropic services in the Commonwealth of Australia.
- George Shirtcliffe OBE For public services in the Dominion of New Zealand.
- Song Ong Siang CBE VD For public services in the Straits Settlements.

==== Commander of the Order of the British Empire (CBE) ====
Military Division
Royal Navy

- Vice-Admiral Francis Wade Caulfeild (Retired).
- Paymaster Captain William Douglas Travers Morrish RN

Army

- Major (temporary Lieutenant-Colonel) Esmond Humphrey Miller Clifford OBE MC Royal Engineers, Senior British Commissioner, British Somaliland Ethiopia Boundary Commission.
- Colonel (temporary Brigadier) Percy Muir McFarlane, Staff Corps, Australian Military Forces, Commander Field Troops, 4th Military District, South Australia, and Base Commandant and District Commandant (temporary) 4th District Base, Adelaide.

Royal Air Force

- Group Captain Thomas Edward Barham Howe AFC

Civil Division

- Percy Cohen, Head of the Library and Information Department of the Conservative Central Office. For political services.
- Francis Robert Edward Davis OBE Secretary, Great Western Railway Company. On the occasion of the centenary of the Railway.
- Walter Hugh Erskine MBE Deputy Sergeant-at-Arms, House of Commons.
- Percival Hartley MC Director of the Department of Biological Standards, Medical Research Council.
- Myra Hess FRAM For services to music.
- John Louttit Jack, Deputy Secretary, Department of Health for Scotland.
- John Hier Jacob OBE Assistant Public Trustee.
- David Little JP Chairman of the Leeds Local Employment Committee.
- John Frederick Marshall, Honorary Director of the British Mosquito Control Institute, Hayling Island.
- Alfred James Martin OBE Assistant Comptroller, Patent Office, Board of Trade.
- John Maxwell, Chief Constable of Manchester.
- Olga Isabella Nethersole ARRC Honorary Organiser of the People's League of Health.
- John Woollands Shaw, General Secretary of the Order of Druids Friendly Society. Lately Chairman of the Approved Societies Consultative Council.

Diplomatic Service and Overseas List

- James Nield Cameron, Director of the Department of Agriculture, Sudan Government.
- The Right Reverend Edward Francis Every Bishop of Argentina and Eastern South America.
- Frank Savery OBE His Majesty's Consul at Warsaw.

Colonies, Protectorates, etc.

- Charles Archibald Hoadley Principal of the Footscray Technical School, and Chief Commissioner, Boy Scouts Association, State of Victoria.
- Patrick Joseph Lynch, Federal President of the Blinded Soldiers Association, Commonwealth of Australia.
- Charles John McKenzie, Engineer-in-Chief and Under-Secretary, Public Works Department, Dominion of New Zealand.
- Hubert Leonard Murray, Official Secretary, Territory of Papua, Commonwealth of Australia.
- James Hugh Sims, Deputy Resident Commissioner and Government Secretary, Basutoland.
- Arthur Edward Victor Barton OBE Collector of Customs and Excise, Trinidad.
- James Reginald Conyers. For public services in Bermuda.
- Spencer Pelham Flowerdew. For services as Executive Engineer in charge of the northern extension of the Nyasaland Railways.
- Hallam Brookfield Egmont Hake. For public services in the Federated Malay States.
- Howard Lecky Sikes MInstCE Director of Public Works, Kenya.
- Leslie Mason Smart, General Manager of the Government Railway, Gold Coast.

British India

- Lieutenant-Colonel Alan MacDonald Dick OBE Indian Medical Service, Professor of Ophthalmology, King Edward Medical College, Lahore, Punjab.
- Rai Bahadur Seth Sukhlal Karnani OBE Banker and Merchant, Calcutta, Bengal.

Honorary Commanders

- Assem Bey Said OBE Mayor of Jaffa, Palestine.

==== Officer of the Order of the British Empire (OBE) ====
Military Division
Royal Navy

- Captain Alexander Boyd Greig DSC RN (Retired).
- Engineer Commander Vivian Douglas Nops RN
- Surgeon Commander Frederick George Hitch MRCS LRCP RN
- Lieutenant-Commander Cecil Craster Mowbray Usher RN
- Lieutenant-Commander Frank Alexander Slocum RN
- Paymaster Commander James Bernard Foley

Army

- Major James Edward Cobbett, Supernumerary List, Indian Army, Military Estates. Officer (temporary), Cantonments Department, Peshawar, India.
- Captain William Maurice Harrington MC MM Regular Army Reserve of Officers, Staff Quartermaster, Gold Coast Regiment, Royal West African Frontier Force.
- Major Leonard Guise Hudson-Heaven, Kingston Infantry Volunteers, Jamaica Local Forces.
- Major (Commissary) Thomas Ray Sanderson, India Miscellaneous List, Officer Supervisor, Office of Assistant-Director of Ordnance Services, Master-General of the Ordnance Branch, Army Headquarters, India.
- Major Grahame Williamson, Royal Army Veterinary Corps, Deputy Assistant Director of Veterinary Services, Baluchistan-District, India.
- Major John William Young, 10th Gurkha Rifles, Indian Army, General Staff Officer, 3rd Grade (temporary), Presidency and Assam District, India.

Civil Division

- Robert Moir Allardyce MC Director of Education, Glasgow.
- Beatrix Marguerite Fox Batten MBE Assistant County Director and Assistant County Controller for Kent, British Red Cross Society.
- Edward Godfrey Brown, Music Director, Northern Ireland Region, British Broadcasting Corporation.
- Henry Albert Cole, Chief Superintendent of Physical Training, Sheffield Education Committee.
- Thomas Croo ARCS Principal of the Mineral Resources Department, Imperial Institute.
- Robert William Dodgson MRCP MRCS Director of Shellfish Services, Ministry of Agriculture and Fisheries.
- Charles Gleaston Burgess Ellison JP For services to Barrow in Furness.
- John Follett Morris Fawcett, District Probate Registrar at Winchester.
- Agnes Crabb Glegg. For political, public and social services in Aberdeen.
- Joshua Graham, Principal Officer, West of Scotland District, Board of Trade.
- John Griffiths MRCS LRCP Medical Officer of the Neath Rural District Council.
- Walter Crossfield Hankinson MC Principal, Dominions Office. Temporary Representative in the Commonwealth of Australia of H.M. Government in the United Kingdom.
- Jane Ellen Leslie Harrison MBE JP Honorary Organising County Secretary for the Personal Service League, Staffordshire Branch.
- George Edward Holden MBE FIC Technical Adviser to the Dyestuffs Advisory Licensing Committee. Vice-Chairman and Joint Managing Director of the English Velvet and Cord Dyers Association.
- Judith Marian Gildart Jackson, Private Secretary to Stanley Baldwin.
- Margaret Meekings Johnson. For public services in Essex.
- George Shepherd Shepherd-Jones MBE Assistant Accountant-General, Board of Customs and Excise.
- Mary Latchford Kingsmill-Jones JP For political, public and social services in Manchester.
- Alderman William Robert Jones JP For public services in Bangor.
- John Frederick Lean, Principal Assistant to the General Manager, Great Western Railway Company. On the occasion of the centenary of the Railway.
- John Henry Linfield. For political and public services in the West Riding of Yorkshire.
- John William Marsden Superintending Valuer, Valuation Office, Board of Inland Revenue.
- Charles James Mercer MIEE Staff Engineer, Headquarters Engineering Department, General Post Office.
- Albert Miller MBE Head of Section, Contracts Branch, Secretariat, H.M. Office of Works.
- William Blackford Mitchell, Chief Assistant Keeper, General Register House, Edinburgh.
- Frank Rayns, Director of the Norfolk Agricultural Station.
- Herbert Stanley Clucas Rees, Headmaster of Saltersford School, Holmes Chapel, Crewe.
- John Macgill Rusk SSC JP Chairman of the Scottish Advisory Committee on the Welfare of the Blind.
- Isabella Hamilton Sloan, Principal, Ministry of Labour. Estcourt Southcombe. For political and public services in Yeovil.
- Herbert Lawrence Stevens FRAeS Principal Scientific Officer, Air Ministry.
- Wilfred Francis Tempest. For public services in the West Riding of Yorkshire.
- David John Thomas, Chairman of the South East Glamorgan War Pensions Committee.
- Frederick Ebenezer Waters, Principal, General Post Office.
- John Williamson, Chief Constable of the Northampton Borough Police.
- Herbert Whesterby Younger, H.M. Superintending Inspector of Factories.

Diplomatic Service and Overseas List

- The Reverend Canon Charles Kerby Blount Chaplain of Holy Trinity Church, Montevideo.
- Wallace Broatch, President of the British Community Council, Port Said.
- John Joseph Drumm, His Majesty's Consul at Gothenburg.
- Ruth Veronica Pennington. For relief work among refugees in Albania.
- Reginald Percy Ray MBE Translator and Second Secretary (local rank) to His Majesty's Embassy at Lisbon.
- The Reverend Joseph William Wright, until recently Superintendent of Methodist Churches in Panama and Costa Rica.

Colonies, Protectorates, etc.

- Mary Elizabeth Adams. For charitable services in the Commonwealth of Australia.
- Arthur William Beadle, formerly Secretary to the Treasury, Southern Rhodesia.
- Captain Stephen George Green, Chairman of the Committee of the Royal Shipwreck Relief and Humane Society, State of New South Wales.
- Captain Laurence Holbech DSO MC Aide-de-Camp to the Governor of Southern Rhodesia.
- Robert Jamison FRCS Principal Medical Officer, Swaziland.
- Edward Allan McDonald. For social and municipal services in the State of Victoria.
- William Michael McHugo. For services to ex-service men in the Commonwealth of Australia.
- Esther Zillah Michaelis. For services to ex-service men in the Commonwealth of Australia.
- Richard Charles Mills Professor of Economics and Dean of the Faculty of Economics, University of Sydney, State of New South Wales.
- William Arundel Orchard For services to music in the State of New South Wales.
- Maude Elizabeth Parkes. For social and philanthropic services in the Dominion of New Zealand.
- Samuel Henry Richardson. For services to ex-service men and their dependents in the Commonwealth of Australia.
- William James Robinson AMICE Chief Engineer, Department of Public Works, Newfoundland.
- Ann Gilchrist Strong, Dean of the Home Service Department, Otago University, Dominion of New Zealand.
- Thomas Waites, Government Statistician, State of New South Wales.
- Lieutenant-Colonel Eric Litchfield Brooke Anderson DSO Colonial Administrative Service, Distract Officer, Kenya.
- Ignatius Cecil Beaubrun, Colonial Treasurer, Grenada, Windward Islands.
- William Kenneth Bagger MC MRCS LRCP Colonial Medical Service, Senior Medical Officer, Palestine.
- The Reverend Canon Gerald Webb Broomfield For services to education in Zanzibar.
- Katherine Janet, Lady Burdon. For services to the West Indies and in connection with the publication of the archives of British Honduras.
- Cyril Charles Herbert Cuff FRCS Colonial Medical Service, Surgical Specialist, Cyprus.
- John Discombe, lately of the Colonial Legal Service, Registrar, Supreme Court, Gibraltar.
- Major Bertram Montague Ede, Defence Security Officer, Malta. Salvatore Galea, Commissioner of Police, Malta.
- Noel Clinton Hollins, Colonial Administrative Service, Senior District Commissioner, Sierra Leone.
- John Hutson MBE VD For public services in Barbados.
- Major Norman Ross Junner MC FGS MIMM Director, Geological Survey, Gold Coast.
- Alfred Travers Lacey Director of Education, Nyasaland Protectorate.
- Henry William James Lavers, Postmaster-General, Mauritius.
- Eric MacDonald MC Colonial Forest Service, Conservator of Forests, Sierra Leone.
- Henry Ignatius Melhado. For public services in British Honduras.
- William Brownlow Ashe Moore LRCP Colonial Medical Service, Deputy Director of Medical and Sanitary Services, Hong Kong.
- Libert Oury. For services in connection with the Zambesi Bridge.
- Captain Archibald Thomas Ayres Ritchie MC Game Warden, Kenya.
- Neville Victor Stafford Solomon, Treasurer, Bahamas.
- Mary Josephine Were LRCP Colonial Medical Service, Lady Medical Officer, Federated Malay States.

British India

- Khan Bahadur Ahmad Alladin, Merchant, Hyderabad, Deccan.
- Percival Alexander Belcham, Manager, Rai Bahadur Bansilal Spinning and Weaving Mills, Hinganghat, Central Provinces.
- Debendra Nath Sen, lately Principal of the Bihar National College, Bankipore, Bihar and Orissa.
- Framroze Hormusjee Cowasjee Dinshaw, Manager, Messrs. Cowasjee Dinshaw & Bros., Aden.
- Frank Anthony Albert Hart Imperial Forest Service, Forest Adviser, Eastern States Agency.
- Thomas White Johnstone MBE Chief Inspector of Factories, Bombay Presidency, Bombay.
- William Wallace Ladden, lately Mayor of the Corporation of Madras, Madras.
- Archibald Campbell Murray, Managing Director of the Canteen Contractors Syndicate.
- Rai Bahadur Sa-hu Har Prasad, lately Chairman of the Municipal Board, Pilibhit, United Provinces.
- Cowas Burjorji Sethna, Station Director, Indian State Broadcasting Service, Bombay.
- George Ronald Seton, Sub-Agent, Imperial Bank of India, Rangoon, Burma.
- Shanti Swaroop Bhatnagar Professor of Physical Chemistry and Director, University Laboratories, Punjab University, Punjab.
- Edward Fairlie Watson, Superintendent, Governor's Estates, Bengal.

==== Member of the Order of the British Empire (MBE) ====
Military Division
Royal Navy

- Telegraphist Lieutenant Charles Clement France DSM RN
- Shipwright Lieutenant Allen Beaumont Frise RN
- Wardmaster Lieutenant Wilfred George Olver MSM RN
- Commissioned Boatswain George Frederick Wheeler RN
- Commissioned Engineer Walter Stuart McMath RN
- Commissioned Telegraphist Archibald Duncan McLachlan

Army

- Warrant Officer, Class I, Regimental Sergeant-Major Frederick Thomas Baldwin MM late Staff Instructor, Johore Volunteer Engineers, Malay States.
- Warrant Officer, Class I, Regimental Sergeant-Major Charles Edmund Brixius Cannon, Ceylon Light Infantry, Ceylon Defence Force.
- Warrant Officer, Class II, Company Sergeant-Major John Rhys Danson DCM Penang and Province Wellesley Volunteer Corps, 3rd Battalion Straits Settlements Volunteer Force.
- Major Alexander Bayley-de Castro, Indian Medical Department, Superintendent, Military Medical Students Class, Medical College, Calcutta, India.
- Warrant Officer, Class I, Regimental Sergeant-Major Instructor, Edwin Harold, India Unattached List, Army School of Physical Training, Ambala, India.
- Lieutenant (acting Captain) Mohamed Ali bin Maidin, Company Commander, Malay Company, Malacca Volunteer Corps, 4th Battalion Straits Settlements Volunteer Force.
- Lieutenant (Assistant Commissary) Alfred Edward Perrin, Indian Army Corps of Clerks, Chief Clerk, Madras District, India.
- Warrant Officer, Class I, Staff Sergeant-Major 1st Class Richard Bird Webber, Instructional Corps, Australian Military Forces.

Civil Division

- Ernest Percy Barnes, Chief Superintendent, Bristol City. Police.
- Captain Sydney Barraclough, Education Officer, Grade III, Air Ministry.
- Harry Perkins Bassil, Senior Examiner, Estate Duty, Office, Board of Inland Revenue.
- Mary Blair. For political and public services in Belfast.
- Gilbert Humphrey Bowles, Commandant, Metropolitan Special Constabulary.
- Charles Andrew Boyle, Waterguard Superintendent (2nd Class), Board of Customs and Excise.
- Leopold James Brearley, Staff Officer, Colonial Office.
- Harry Bridgeman Superintendent of Works, Southampton District, H.M. Office of Works.
- Dorothy Amy Fisher-Brown, Secretary to Liberal National Whips, since November, 1931. For political services.
- James Brown. For political and public services in Glasgow.
- Albert Canning, Superintendent, Metropolitan Police.
- Thompson Close, Agricultural Machinery Officer, Ministry of Agriculture and Fisheries.
- Edith Cooper, lately Head Mistress, City Road Senior. Girls School, Birmingham.
- Herbert Cecil Craft, Staff Officer, Board of Trade.
- Shemavon Danelian, Civil Assistant employed under the War Office.
- Margaret-Irene Dicker, Woman Administrative Assistant, War Office.
- Alan George Dryland MC Engineer-in-Charge, London Station, British Broadcasting Corporation.
- William George Dunning, lately Senior Clerk, Port Sanitary Office, Liverpool.
- Averilll Doris Balls. For voluntary services at the Royal Infirmary and the Royal Children's Hospital, Liverpool.
- Sarah Barbara Forth, lately Principal of the Salisbury Teachers Training College.
- Hugh Mackay Graham Fraser JP Headmaster, Scourie Public School, Sutherland.
- Andrew Fullerton, Accountant, North Eastern Division, Ministry of Labour.
- Captain Leonard Percy Gill, Assistant Engineer, Engineering Department, Northern Ireland District, General Post Office.
- Jean Methuen Graham, Secretary, Scottish Branch, Queen's Institute of District Nursing.
- Lillian Eliza Lovell Harrison. For social services in Hornsey.
- Edward Headen, Superintendent, Durham Constabulary.
- Caroline Mary Gertrude Jameson. For services to the blind.
- John Jones, Sanitary. Inspector of Newquay Urban District, and Aberayron Urban and Rural Districts, Cardiganshire.
- Mabel Lilian Killpartrick, Clerical Officer, India Office.
- Alderman Jesse Frederick Lee JP For services to Gosport.
- John Lynass Magrath, Sales. Manager, North Midland District, General Post Office.
- Miss Edith Mary Mahlendorff, Superintendent, London Telephone Service, General Post Office.
- Edward Augustus Malby Deputy Chief Superintendent, Mapping Branch, Land Registry.
- James Rees-Pedlar, Chief Designer, Royal Naval Torpedo Factory, Greenock.
- Herbert Conway Potts, Principal Clerk, Ministry of Pensions.
- Albert George Rawlings until recently Headmaster, Derby Road Central Boys School, Gloucester.
- George Wright Reid, Public Assistance Officer for the City of Aberdeen.
- Ethel Annie Great Rex, Chairman of the Woolwich and Greenwich Children's Sub-Committee of the South East Metropolitan War Pensions Committee.
- Ethel Gertrude Richards, District Nurse, Porthcawl.
- Mary Naismith Russell, Headmistress, Paisley Special School for Defective Children.
- Frederick Charles Sheldon, Senior Locomotive Running Inspector, Chief Mechanical Engineer's Department, Swindon, Great Western Railway Company. On the occasion of the centenary of the Railway.
- Henry Horatio Spears, lately Chief, Sanitary Inspector, West Bromwich County Borough.
- Percival John Spratt, Staff Officer, Scottish Office.
- Ina Amelia. Strong, Higher Clerical Officer, Foreign Office.
- Ernest John Sutton, Staff Officer, Grade II, Ministry of Transport.
- William Baker Thomas, Senior Staff Officer, Ministry of Health.
- George William Turnbull JP For services to West Hartlepool.
- Frank Tyrell, Chief Clerk, Imperial War Graves Commission.
- Albert Harold Wade, Staff Clerk, Prison Commission.
- Alexander George Webb, Member of the Ministry of Pensions. Special Grants Committee.
- Frederick Wilkinson, Manager of the Fish, Game, Poultry and English Egg Section of the Co-operative Wholesale Society.
- Elizabeth Williams. For political, and public, services in Newcastle upon Tyne.
- Maude Mary Williamson, Assistant County Director and Controller for Northumberland, British Red Cross Society.
- Adam Frank Wilson, Land Officer, Department of Agriculture for Scotland.

Diplomatic Service and Overseas List

- Evelyn Margaret Bourchier. For services in connection with the Girl Guide movement in Mexico.
- Charles Mack George, representative of His Majesty's Office of Works at Tehran.
- Lieutenant-Commander John Martin RN (retired), late British Vice-Consul at Dakar.
- Thomasina Cunningham Miller, Clerical Officer at His Majesty's Legation at Prague.
- Frederick William George Richardson, Collector of Customs, Sudan Government.
- Engineer Captain James Lindsey Sands RN (retired), British Vice-Consul at St. Vincent, Cape Verde Islands.
- Herbert Rollo Thompson, Headmaster of the British Boys School, Alexandria.
- Roger Charles Seymour Thynne, temporary Secretary at His Majesty's Legation to the Holy See.
- Vivian Wigg, British Vice-Consul at Rio Grande do Sul, Brazil.

Colonies, Protectorates, etc.

- Emily Agnes Abel, formerly Secretary of the Western Australian Division of the Red Cross Society, Commonwealth of Australia.
- Alfred John Chambers, Federal President of the T.B. Sailors and Soldiers Association of New South Wales, Commonwealth of Australia.
- William Charles Hall Cridland, State President of the T.B. Sailors and Soldiers Association of New South Wales, Commonwealth of Australia.
- The Reverend Moses Isaac Cohen. For social services in Southern Rhodesia.
- The Reverend William Ewart Dawson. For educational services in Swaziland.
- Catherine Elliott. For services in connection with infant and maternal welfare in the Commonwealth of Australia.
- Bessie Louise Hubbard. For social services in the Commonwealth of Australia.
- Arthur Francis Basset Hull. For services to natural history in the Commonwealth of Australia.
- Harold Varlo Hutchings, Secretary for Customs, Newfoundland.
- Haughton Somerville Innes. For public services in the Commonwealth of Australia.
- Albert Edward James, Federal Secretary of the T.B. Sailors and Soldiers Association of New South Wales, Commonwealth of Australia.
- Charles Ernest Augustine Jeffery. For services to education in Newfoundland.
- Ellen Kinchington. For social services in the Commonwealth of Australia.
- Ella Wharton Kirke. For philanthropic services in the State of New South Wales.
- Charlotte Mary Clarina Leal. For social services in the Commonwealth of Australia.
- Cecil Daniel Lockhart. For social services in the State of New South Wales.
- Captain Ellis Russell Maryland, Resident Engineer in the construction of the Birchenough Bridge, Southern Rhodesia.
- William Scott. For public services in Basutoland.
- Edward John Sherwood. For social services in the State of New South Wales.
- Francis James Stephenson. For services to ex-service men in the State of New South Wales.
- Millie Thomas. For social services in the Commonwealth of Australia.
- Frederick Ashley Thorpe. For social services in the State of New South Wales.
- Charlotte Wills. For social services in the Commonwealth of Australia.
- Mohamed Allam, Clerk, Special Class, Kenya and Uganda Railways and Harbours.
- Edward Barry, Colonial Administrative Service, Assistant District Officer, Somaliland Protectorate.
- Frederic Harold Roberts Came AMInstCE Assistant. Engineer, Public Works Department, Uganda Protectorate.
- Henry Perot Christiani, Secretary and Accountant, Lands and Mines Department, British Guiana.
- Alexander Tancred Curie, Colonial Administrative Service, Assistant District Officer, Somaliland Protectorate.
- Robert McLean Gibson FRCS For public services in Hong Kong.
- Margaret Dorothy Gimson. For services during the malaria epidemic in Ceylon.
- Robert Ranulf Glanville, Colonial Agricultural Service, Agricultural Officer, Sierra Leone.
- Arthur Bayford Heron, Storekeeper, Department of Health, Palestine.
- James William Dunbar Locker, Colonial Administrative Service, Assistant District Commissioner, Nyasaland Protectorate.
- John Smith Moffat, Colonial Administrative Service, District Officer, Northern Rhodesia.
- Michael John Brew Molohan, Colonial Administrative Service, Assistant District Officer, Tanganyika Territory.
- Gertrude Owen. For public services in the Straits Settlements.
- Edith Ruth Pasley, Supervisor of Telegraphs, Ceylon.
- Rai Sahib Achhru Ram, Civil Surgeon, Uganda Protectorate.
- Aleck Leopold Rhodes, Government Printer, Trinidad.
- Henry Emmanuel Richter, Clerk, Senior Division, Gold Coast.
- The Reverend Walter Henry Richards. For public services in the Windward Islands.
- Caroline Annie Beatrice Russell. For social services in Fiji.
- Mohamed Sudan, Special Grade Clerk, Kenya.
- Janet Welch For services in connection with maternal and child welfare in the Nyasaland Protectorate.
- Alexander Thomas Williams, Colonial Administrative Service, District Officer, Northern Rhodesia.
- Marguerite Gordon Yearwood. For public services in Barbados.

British India

- Rai Bahadur Pandit Baldev Ram Dave, Vakil, High Court, Allahabad, United Provinces.
- Cyril Rupert Battersby, Superintendent, Government Printing, Bengal.
- Frederick William Bull, Secretary, District Board, Montgomery, Punjab.
- Joseph Burnett, District Officer, St. John Ambulance Brigade, Bengal.
- Terrence John Carroll, Honorary Assistant Engineer (retired), Burma Railways, Maymyo, Burma.
- Kenneth Samuel Curtis, Assistant Director of Survey, Tanjore; lately Secretary, Leprosy Relief Campaign, Madras.
- Anselm Francis D'Abreo, Head Steward, J. J. Group of Hospitals, Bombay.
- David Victor Gnana Muthu, Superintendent, Itki Sanatorium, Bihar and Orissa.
- John Vernon Hildreth, Chief Inspector, Control, Security Printing, India.
- John Christopher Joslyn, Deputy Superintendent of Police, Madras.
- Thomas Kelly, (Superintendent, Quartermaster-General's Branch, Army Headquarters, Government of India.
- Edward Stuart Keymer, Imperial Secretariat Service, Superintendent, Home Department, Government of India.
- Donald Lamont, Chief Engineer of the Dredger Lord Willingdon at Cochin, Madras.
- Captain Mit Singh Bahadur MC IDSM Indian Army, 5th Battalion, 11th Sikh Regiment, lately Commandant, Jind Infantry, Jind State, Punjab States.
- Khan Bahadur Dadabhoy Nadirshaw, Personal Assistant to the Member of the Governor General's Executive Council in charge of Commerce and Railways.
- Charles Henry Reader, Superintendent, Viceregal Gardens.
- Kaikhusro Sorabji Sethna, Health Officer of the Delhi Municipality, and Provincial Commissioner, Delhi Boy Scouts Association, Delhi.
- Herbert St. Clair Smith, Bombay Civil Service (retired), lately Deputy Collector of Bombay and Bombay Suburban District, Bombay.
- Samuel Alfred Stratton, Deputy Superintendent of Police, Bengal.
- Rai Bahadur Lala Ugra Sen, Chairman, Municipal Board, Dehra Dun, United Provinces.
- Rao Bahadur Vishvanath Ganesh Mankar, Honorary Magistrate and Landlord, Poona, Bombay.
- Khan Bahadur Haji Wajih-Uddin, Honorary Magistrate, Meerut, United Provinces.
- Ernest Horace White, Superintendent, General Staff Branch, Army Headquarters, Government of India.
- William Arthur John White, Superintendent, Headquarters, Royal Air Force, India.
- Philip Duncan Wilson, Superintendent, Office of the Military Secretary to the Viceroy.

Honorary Members

- Fuad Dajani MRCS LRCP For public services in Palestine.
- Hassan Faiz Effendi Idrissi, Assistant Superintendent of Police, Palestine.
- Girgis Effendi Khoury, Administrative Officer, Palestine.
- Eliahu Krause. For services to agriculture in Palestine.

=== Members of the Order of the Companions of Honour (CH) ===
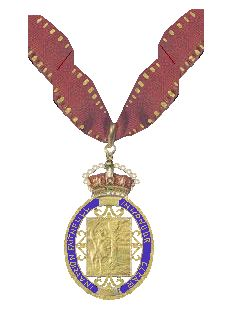
The riband and badge of the "Companions of Honour"

- John Dover Wilson FBA For services to Literature.

=== Kaisar-i-Hind Medal ===
First Class

- Edna, Lady Gowan (wife of Sir Hyde Gowan KCSI CIE VD Governor of the Central Provinces).
- Pauline, Lady Griffith (wife of Sir Ralph Griffith KCSI CIE Governor of the North-West Frontier Province).
- Helen, Lady Macpherson (wife of Sir Stewart Macpherson CIE Puisne Judge of the High Court of Judicature at Patna, Bihar and Orissa).
- The Reverend Mother Xavier Murphy, Superioress General of the Presentation Convents in South India, Madras.
- Begum Shah Nawaz (wife of Mian Shah Nawaz, Barrister-at-Law, Lahore).
- Kudumulu Radhabai Subbarayan (wife of Dr. P. Subbarayan, Zamindar of Kumaramangalam, Salem District, Madras).
- Jessie Helen Tasker (wife of Theodore James Tasker CIE OBE Revenue and Police Member, His Exalted Highness the Nizam's Executive Council, Hyderabad, Deccan).
- Frederick Theodore Jones CIE MVO Superintending Engineer, Central Public Works Department, Delhi.
- Ramkrishna Narayan Parmanand, L.M and S. (Bombay), Chief Medical Officer, Adams Wylie Memorial Hospital, Bombay.
- The Reverend Otto Harry Stursberg, Missionary, Berhampore, Bengal.

=== British Empire Medal (BEM) ===
Military Division

For Meritorious Service

- Company Quartermaster-Sergeant Herbert Alfred Leslie Orchard, Singapore Volunteer Corps. Straits Settlements Volunteer Forces.
- Sergeant Robert Paisley Whyte, Malay States Volunteer Regiment, Federated Malay States Volunteer Force.
- Bash Shawish (Sergeant-Major) Abdel Hamid Ali, The Sudan Horse, Sudan Defence Force.

Civil Division
For Meritorious Service

- Ernest Benjamin Brown, Commander, Metropolitan Special Constabulary.
- William Enoch Butland, Bridge Inspector, Engineering Department, Plymouth, Great Western Railway Company. On the occasion of the centenary of the Railway.
- George Arthur Gilder, Sorting Clerk and Telegraphist, Brighton, General Post Office.
- Bertie James Hammond, Detective Lieutenant, Glasgow City Police.
- Richard Thomas Holt, Overseer, Haverfordwest, General Post Office.
- Edward Hurley, Passenger Guard, Traffic Department; Paddington, Great Western Railway Company. On the occasion of the centenary of the Railway.
- Lily Rebecca Jackson, Supervisor of Sorting Assistants, General Post Office.
- John William Jump, Sorting Clerk and Telegraphist, Preston, General Post Office.
- Frederick George Lamb, Assistant Head Messenger, General Post Office.
- Wallace Reginald Morris, District Inspector, Goods Department, Birmingham, Great Western Railway Company. On the occasion of the centenary of the Railway.
- William O'Shea, Head Postman, Birmingham, General Post Office.
- Victor George Pendry, Skilled Workman, Class II, South Western Engineering District, General Post Office.
- Robert Donald Rust, lately Senior King's Home Service Messenger, Foreign Office.
- Henry Bazil Walker, Chief Warder (Class I), H.M. Prison, Pentonville.
- Mahammed Youcef Bouguerra, Consulate Office Keeper, Algiers.
- Atiatalla el Hadi, Dispensary Doctor, Sudan.
- Bishamber das Jain, lately Head Clerk, Office of the Assistant Director of Public Health, Delhi Province, India.
- Arthur Patrick Daly, British Police Constable, Palestine Police.
- Enche Mohamed Hashim bin Haji Talib. Head Malay Teacher, Sultan Idris Training College, Tanjong Malim, Federated Malay States.

=== Air Force Cross ===
- Squadron Leader Adrian Henry Paull.
- Flight Lieutenant Claude McClean Vincent DFC
- Flight Lieutenant Edward George Honeywood Russell-Stracey.

=== Air Force Medal ===
- Flight Sergeant William Wallace.
- Sergeant (Pilot) John Harry Tee.

=== King's Police Medal (KPM) ===
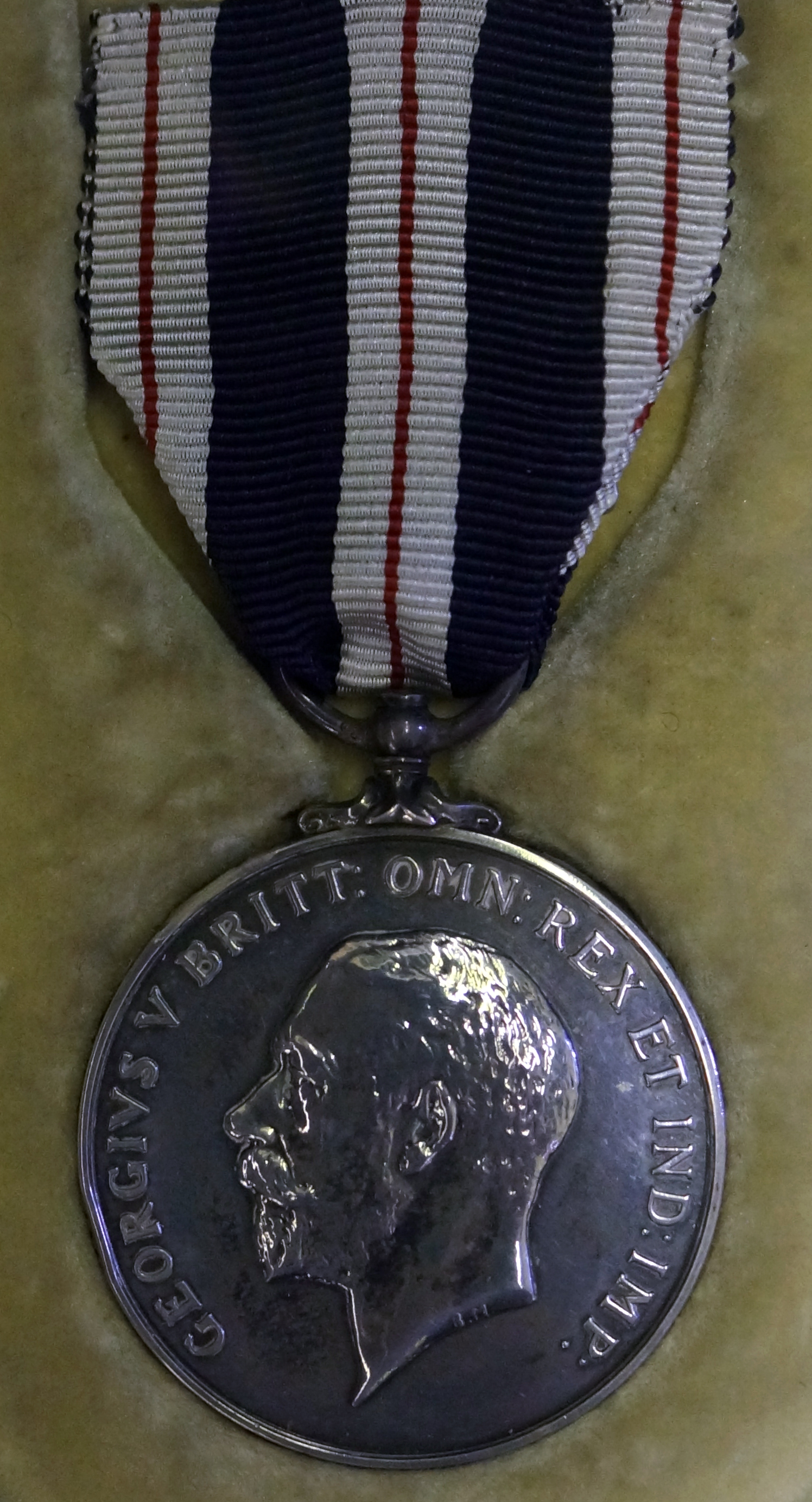
King's Police Medal with the riband for gallantry

For Gallantry
England and Wales

- James Airton, Constable, Metropolitan Police Force.
- Allan Densham, Constable, Metropolitan Police Force.
- Charles Edmond Fox, Constable, Metropolitan Police Force.
- Gordon Jack Green, Constable, Metropolitan Police Force.
- Edward Morris, Constable, Metropolitan Police Force.
- Charles Frederick Robinson, Constable, Metropolitan Police Force.
- Kenneth Walter Lawrence Steele, Constable, Metropolitan Police Force.
- James Warrender Thomson, Constable, Metropolitan Police Force.
- Ronald Martin, Constable, Kent Constabulary.
- Robert Gittings, Constable, Liverpool City Police Force.
- John Tiernan, Constable, Liverpool City Police Force Police, Scotland.
- Thomas Mainland, Constable, Orkney Constabulary.
- Alexander Murray, Constable, Glasgow City Police.
- Malcolm Shaw, Constable, Glasgow City Police.
- Percy George Waldren, Fireman, London Fire Brigade.

Australia

- John Tucker Arthurson, Constable, New South Wales Police.
- Michael Bishop, Constable, Queensland Police.

British India

- Frederick William O'Gorman, Indian Police, Bombay. (a second bar to the King's Police Medal)
- Khan Saheb Ghulam Akbar Allah Dad Khan, Inspector, Bombay Police.
- George Joseph Bird, Inspector, Bombay Police.
- Yashawant Arjun Devle, Head Constable, Bombay Police.
- Sukrulla Mansaballi, Head Constable. Bombay Police.
- Ramchandra Bala Chawan, Constable, Bombay Police.
- Mahmud Ali Khan, Inspector, United Provinces Police.
- Abdul Hamid, Constable, United Provinces Police.
- Sheo Shankar Dube, Inspector, United Provinces Police.
- Parshadi Singli, Constable, United Provinces Police.
- Sardar Sahib Sardar Sudarshan Singh, Deputy Superintendent, Punjab Police.
- Karam Khan, Constable, Punjab Police.
- John Thorne Masey Bennett CBE MC Indian Police, Punjab.
- Frederick Fleming Wemyss, Indian Police, Burma.
- Khan Bahadurj Gulmast Khan, Deputy Superintendent, North-West Frontier Province Police.
- Mohammad Aslaan Khan, Sub-Inspector, North-West Frontier Province Police.
- Talib Hussain Shah, Assistant Sub-Inspector, North-West. Frontier Province Police.
- Zahid Ali, Officiating Assistant Sub-Inspector, North-West Frontier Province Police.
- Bhagat Ram, Foot Constable, North-West Frontier Province Police.
- Babu Dhirendra Nath Chakravarty, Superintendent, Jaipur State Police.

His Majesty has also graciously consented to the King's Police Medal being handed to the nearest, relative of each of the deceased officers whose names appear below and who would have received the Decoration had they survived:

- Khan Bahadur, late Head Constable, North-West Frontier Province Police. (a bar to the King's Police Medal)
- Jibhai Bhojraj Gadhvi, late Constable, Bombay. Police.
- Surab Khan, late Mounted Constable, Punjab Police.

Colonies, Protectorates and Mandated Territories

- Major Alfred Ernest Albert Harragin DSO VD Senior Inspector of Constabulary, Trinidad.
- Frank Thomas Reader, British Constable, Palestine Police.
- Said Jiries Khoury, Mounted Corporal, Palestine Police.
- Mat Atin bin Malim Patani, Lance Sergeant, Federated Malay States Police.

His Majesty has also graciously consented, to the King's Police Medal being handed to the nearest relative of the deceased officer whose name appears below and who would have received the Decoration had he survived:

- Reginald Cyril Victor Mott, late Constable, British Section, Palestine Police.

For Distinguished Service
England and Wales

- Lieutenant-Colonel Sir Hugh Stephenson Turnbull KBE Commissioner of City of London Police Force.
- Lieutenant-Colonel Claud George Cole-Hamilton CMG DSO Chief Constable, Breconshire Constabulary.
- John Ruddick, Chief Constable of the Sunderland Borough Police Force.
- Roynon Baker, Superintendent and Deputy Chief Constable, Monmouthshire Constabulary.
- Lieutenant-Colonel Frederick William Smith DSO DCM MBE Superintendent and Deputy Chief Constable, Glamorgan Constabulary.
- Alfred John Challinor, Superintendent, Staffordshire Constabulary.
- Ernest Stewart, Superintendent, Cumberland and Westmorland Constabulary.
- Tom Clarke, Superintendent, Southport Borough Police Force.
- Benjamin David Pinkerton, Superintendent, Birmingham City Police Force.
- Ralph Rowe, Chief Inspector, Metropolitan Police Force Police, Scotland.
- James Irving, Chief Constable, Coatbridge Burgh Police Force.
- Adam MacLaren, Detective Superintendent, Glasgow City Police Force Police.

Northern Ireland

- Alfred Emerson, Head Constable, Royal Ulster Constabulary.
- James Hetherington, Head Constable, Royal Ulster Constabulary.
- Thomas Percival Robert Kenny, Head Constable, Royal Ulster Constabulary.

British India

- Khan Bahadur Kavasji Jamshedji Petigara CIE OBE ISO Indian Police, Bombay.
- Hem Chandra Sen Gupta, Inspector, Bengal Police.
- Ramendra Nath Mukharji, Officiating Inspector, Bengal Police.
- Hari Bhusan i Banarji, Officiating Inspector, Bengal Police.
- Radha Raman Chatarji, Inspector, Bengal Police.
- Panchanan Sikdar, Officiating Inspector, Bengal Police.
- Heramba Chandra Ghosh, Inspector, Bengal Police.
- Captain Alfred Edward Cartmel MM Burma Military Police.
- Lieutenant-Colonel Rupert Montagu Jacob MC Burma Military Police.
- Thakur Kan Singh, Superintendent, Jodhpur State Police.

Union of South Africa

- Ivan Percy Brind Carpenter, Detective Inspector, British South Africa Police.
- Robert Stanley Perry, Detective Inspector, British South Africa Police.

Colonies, Protectorates and Mandated Territories

- Captain Patrick Tait Brodie DSO MC Commissioner of Police, Sierra Leone.
- Captain George Pritchard Brown, Assistant Commissioner of Police, Kenya;.
- George Hamilton Ferguson, Superintendent of Police, Grade I, Ceylon.
- James Herbert Harvey-Clark, Inspector of Police, 3rd Class, Jamaica.
- Samuel Victor Higgins, Sub-Inspector of Police, Jamaica.
- Henry Marshall-King, Deputy Commissioner of Police, Tanganyika Territory.
- Michael Fitzgerald MC Deputy District Superintendent of Police, Palestine.

=== Imperial Service Medal (ISM) ===
British India

- Mahadu Bhau, lately Jailor, Group III, Yeravda Central Prison, Poona, Bombay.

=== Royal Red Cross (RRC) ===
First Class

- Ethel Green ARRC Lady Superintendent, Queen Alexandra's Military Nursing Service for India, in recognition of the exceptional devotion and competency displayed by her in the performance of her nursing duties in India.
