= M. Venkatasubba Rao =

Indian lawyer and philanthropist

Sir Mutha Venkatasubba Rao (18 July 1878 – 30 December 1960) was an Indian lawyer, philanthropist, socialite and administrator. He served as a judge of the Madras High Court and Agent for Berar.

== Early life and education ==
Venkatasubba Rao was born in Akividu Village in West Godavari District of Andhra Pradesh on 18 July 1878. He graduated from the Madras Christian College and studied law at the Madras Law College.

== Career ==
On completion of his education, Venkatasubba Rao served as junior to Indian jurist C. V. Kumaraswami Sastri. In 1903, he started to practice on his own and was appointed puisne judge of the Madras High Court on 1 November 1921, the first Indian to be appointed. He was appointed a Knight Bachelor in the 1936 New Year Honours list, and was invested with his knighthood at Viceroy's House (now Rashtrapati Bhavan) on 7 March 1936 by the Viceroy of India, the Earl of Willingdon.
