= Janet Welch =

English physician

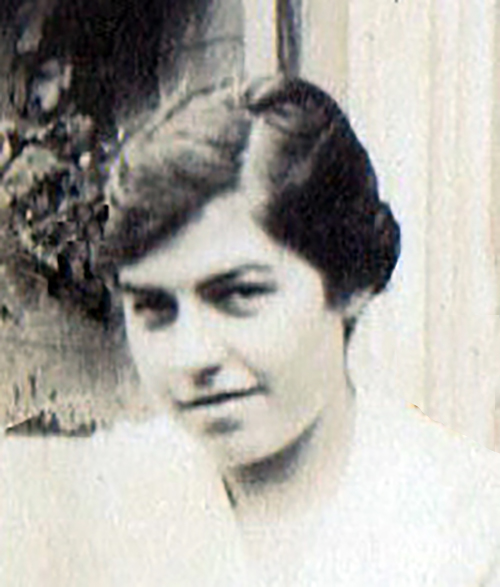
- Janet Welch at the age of 21
- Born: 2 March 1894; North Rauceby, Lincolnshire, England
- Died: 24 November 1959 (aged 65); Washington, D.C., U.S.
- Resting place: Rock Creek Cemetery; Washington, D.C., U.S.
- Known for: Medical work in Africa, the United States Public Health Service, and World Health Organization
- Spouse: Thomas T. Mackie (m. 1942; div. 1951)

Janet Welch Mackie MBE (2 March 1894 – 24 November 1959) was an English doctor who worked mainly in East Africa and the United States. Her work, research and published material helped in establishing modern healthcare and nursing practices in the developing world. From 1926 until 1938, Welch worked as a medical missionary with the Church of Scotland, working mostly in Blantyre in modern day Malawi. In 1942 she emigrated to the United States. In 1946 she became an assistant professor at the Bowman Gray Medical School in North Carolina and eventually went on to become a medical consultant to the United States Public Health Service and World Health Organization.

== Early life ==
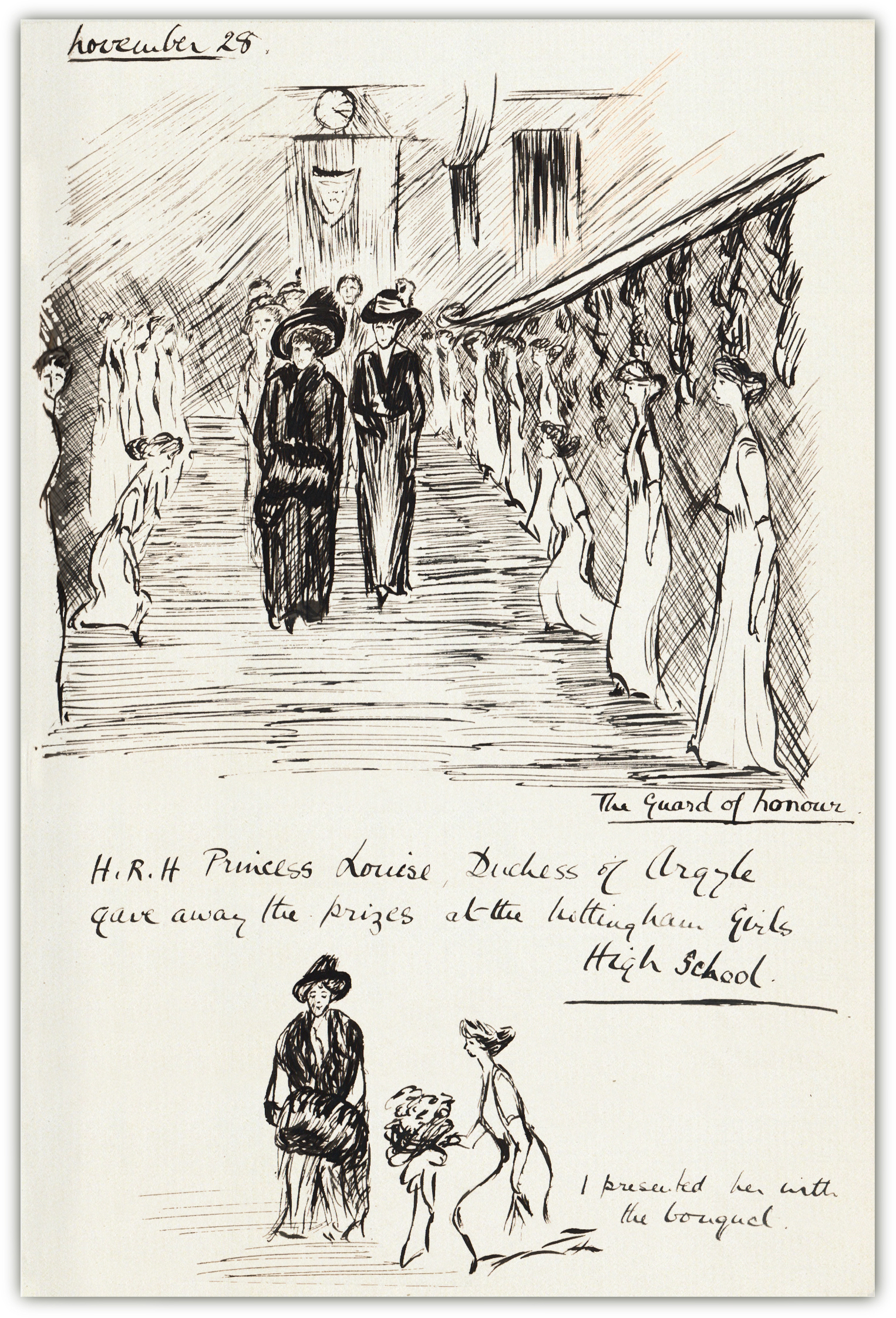
Janet Welch's sketch of the prize giving at Nottingham Girls High School, England in November 1913

Janet Welch was born in March 1894 in the village of North Rauceby in Lincolnshire, England. She was the second daughter of William and Alice. William Welch was a farmer, as his father and grandfather had been. Janet's mother also came from a farming family near Southwell in Nottinghamshire.

Welch attended Sleaford High School until 1908 when her family moved to take over the Hall Farm in Thoroton, Nottinghamshire and, she transferred to Nottingham Girls High School. In her final year at the school she was head girl. Welch chronicled her final 2 years at school (1913 and early 1914) in a series of ink sketches, noting events both in and out of school.

=== First World War ===
In the summer of 1915, Welch joined a Voluntary Aid Detachment. As a VAD, Welch worked as an assistant to professional nurses, first of all at St Dunstan's Hostel for Blinded Soldiers and Sailors at Regent's Park in London and later at the 3rd General London Hospital in Wandsworth. She kept diaries of her time in both hospitals, although only a few fragmentary pages of the diary from Wandsworth have survived. In her diaries, she comments on many of the aspects of life, the people she met and what was going on around her, rather than writing specifically about her work. Janet's diaries from both this period and her schooldays and this wartime period were published in full in 2019.

== Medical career ==
=== Africa ===
In October 1919, Welch enrolled at the London School of Medicine for Women. She graduated MB, BS in 1926. The School of Medicine had by then become part of the Royal Free Hospital in London.

Welch entered the Church of Scotland Missionary Service on 16 September 1926 and by November of that year she was registered as a medical practitioner in Nairobi, Kenya. By 1928 Welch had moved south to Nyasaland (modern day Malawi), where she joined the staff of the Church of Scotland Hospital in Blantyre.

During her time in Africa, Welch established a strong reputation for herself. She was described by various commentators as enthusiastic, energetic and of having a passion and gift for welfare work. In particular she worked with local women to educate them in nursing and midwifery practice. In July 1930, she returned to London for post graduate studies at the London School of Tropical Medicine, graduating with the second highest mark in her class in the spring of 1931 before returning to her post in Blantyre.

In the 1936 New Year Honours she was awarded an MBE for services in connection with maternal and child welfare in the Nyasaland Protectorate and during that year she became the president of the Nyasaland Branch of the British Medical Association.

In October 1938, Welch sailed back to England, left the missionary service and embarked on the next stage of her career. In 1939 she was the recipient of a grant from the New York based Carnegie Foundation to study and report on developments in nursing. In October 1939 Welch left Liverpool by sea for New York.

=== America ===
Welch worked in New York for several months, living at the address of her future husband Thomas T. Mackie on Park Avenue before sailing in June 1940 to Puerto Rico. Her destination in Puerto Rico was the School of Tropical Medicine in San Juan.

In 1941 Welch published a booklet, Nursing Education related to the Cultural Background in East and Southeast African Colonies.

Welch returned to England briefly during late 1941, leaving again on 20 February 1942 on board the SS Aircrest in an Atlantic convoy. She entered the United States on 2 March, and married Thomas Mackie on 14 March.

As the Second World War intensified, Janet's husband was called into service. He served as a doctor with the rank of Colonel, in the US Army in South East Asia. Welch in the meantime continued to work in the US, publishing further booklets, including, Notes on the Techniques of Elementary Public Health Education in 1943 and contributing to publications such as The American Journal of Tropical Medicine and Hygiene: Adaptation of Public Health Practice to Foreign Cultures in 1944 and the American Journal of Nursing: Nursing in Other American Republics, 1945. She travelled widely in Latin America during that time working for the US Office of the Coordinator for Inter-American Affairs. There is at least one reference to her also working with Walt Disney on the series of public health and safety films that The Walt Disney Company produced during that time.

Reunited following the end of the war, Janet and Thomas were offered the opportunity to head up a new department at the Bowman Gray School of Medicine in Winston Salem, North Carolina. She took up the post of assistant professor of preventive medicine in the spring of 1946.

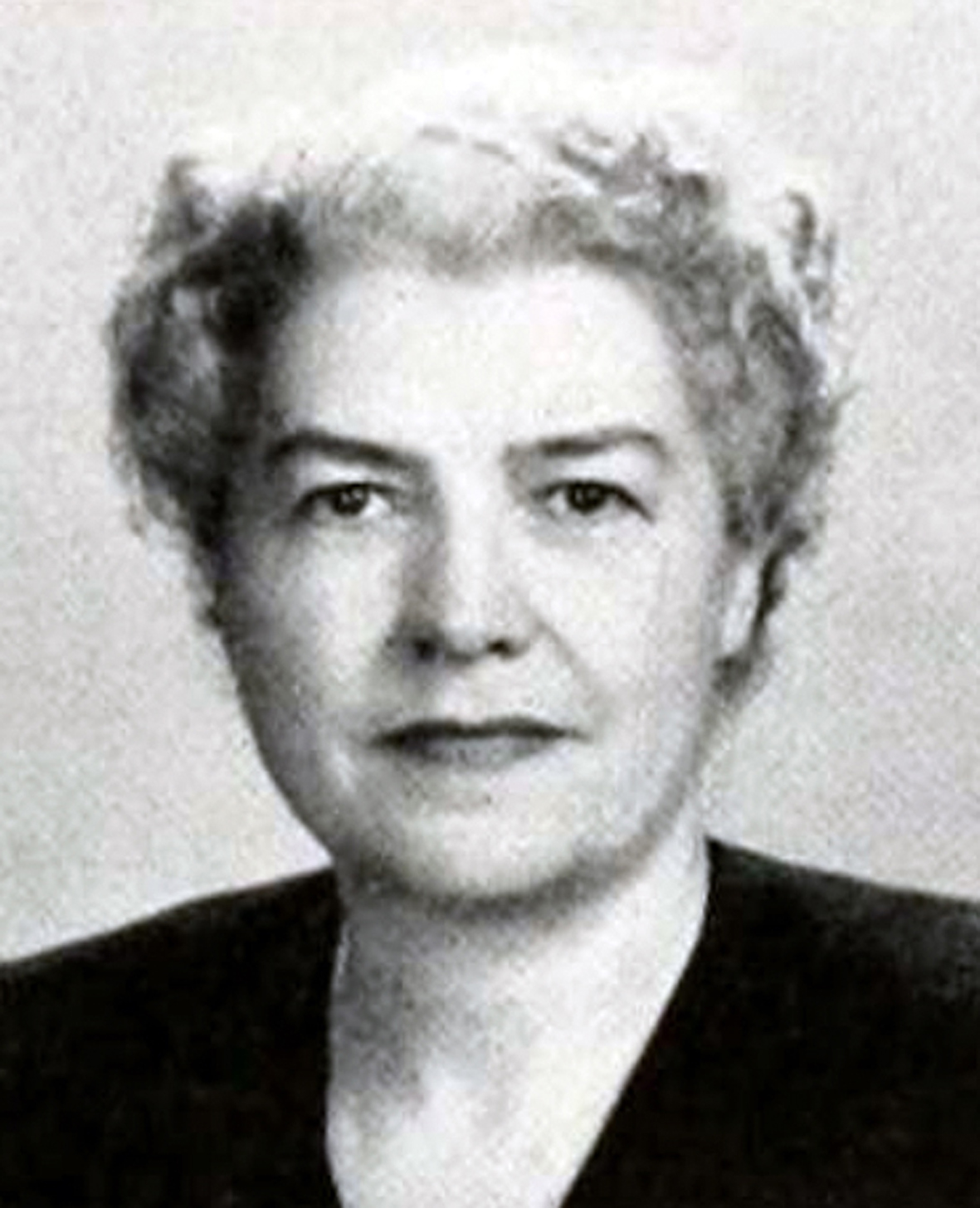
Janet Welch Mackie in her early 50s when she was assistant professor of preventive medicine at Winston Salem in North Carolina

Janet, became a US citizen in 1948. In 1952, she left the school and became a medical consultant to the US Public Health Service. Continuing to live in Winston Salem, Welch worked out of Washington DC, but she worked around the world, with developing communities both within and outside the US. She is recorded as having been a US Public Health Service adviser in Thailand (1954) as well as with native American communities in the southwestern United States, Alaska and Hawaii.

By 1953, she was also a consultant to a World Health Organization expert committee in Geneva.

Welch retired from the US Public Health Service in 1958, at the age of 64. She continued to work with the WHO. however, contributing to several publications and reports.

She also contributed a major section to the National Academy of Sciences publication Tropical Health which was published posthumously in 1962.

Janet Welch died on 24 November 1959. She was waiting to board a train at Washington Union Station in Washington DC, heading home to Winston-Salem when she suffered a fatal heart attack. She was buried at the Rock Creek Cemetery in Washington, D.C.

== Personal life ==
She met her future husband Thomas Mackie at the London School of Medicine in 1930/31 when both were carrying out post graduate studies there. They were divorced in December 1951.
