= Thomas T. Mackie =

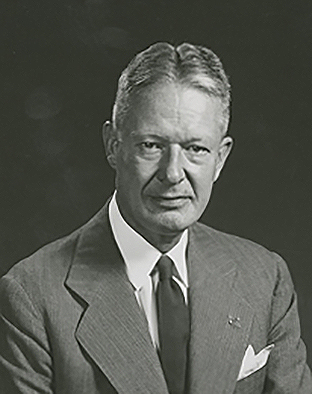
- Born: May 10, 1895; Great Barrington, Massachusetts
- Died: October 5, 1955 (Aged 60)
- Education: Harvard (1918), Columbia University (1924)
- Occupation: Research physician
- Notable work: Manual of Tropical Medicine (textbook)
- Spouse: Carolyn Bleecker Van Courtlandt. May 31, 1921 – July 7, 1941 (divorce) Janet Welch March 14, 1942 – December 4, 1951 (divorce) Helen Holme Warnok. December 19, 1951 – October 5, 1955 (his death)

Thomas T. Mackie (1895–1955) was a research/public health physician in the United States Army during World War II. He was involved in the creation of the first tropical medicine course at the US Army Medical School in 1941. He was one of the three principal authors for the first edition of the Manual of Tropical Medicine.

Later, Mackie continued with his interests in tropical medicine and became the Branch Consultant and Branch Section Chief in Tropical Medicine, Veterans Administration, Professor of Preventive Medicine at the Bowman Gray School of Medicine of Wake Forest College.

== Career ==
Thomas Mackie graduated from Harvard in 1918 and from Columbia University with an MD in 1924. He received a Postgraduate Certificate in Hygiene and Tropical Medicine in 1931 from The London School of Hygiene and Tropical Medicine. In March 1931, he was the joint recipient of the college's Duncan Medal for the highest result in the final exams.

Mackie practiced medicine in New York City throughout the 1930s and was on the teaching staff at Columbia University.

In 1940, Mackie was a founding member and became the director of the American Foundation for Tropical Medicine. By this time, he had also established a base in Puerto Rico.

In 1942, he was called to the army as a lieutenant colonel, serving at the Army Medical School in Washington, in tropical medicine, and later in the South East Asian theatre. He was discharged as a colonel and was awarded the Typhus Commission Medal. Mackie co-authored the Manual of Tropical Medicine with George W Hunter and C Brooke Worth. It became a definitive text on the subject at the time.

In 1946, he was appointed as professor of preventive medicine at the Bowman Gray Medical School in Winston-Salem, North Carolina. His second wife, Janet Welch, was appointed as an assistant professor in the same department. Welch was an English doctor who had specialised in tropical medicine and had worked as a missionary doctor in Kenya and Nyasaland during the 1920s and 30s. She and Mackie first met when both were undertaking postgraduate studies at the London School of Hygiene and Tropical Medicine in 1930.

During his time at Bowman Gray, Mackie was instrumental in persuading the school to establish an Institute of Tropical Medicine in the Dominican Republic. The Woolworth family made a major financial contribution to the establishment of this Institute.

Mackie left his post at the school in the summer of 1951. Correspondence from the time suggests that his relationship with the school management had been fairly fractious from the outset.

After leaving Bowman Gray, Mackie continued to work in the field of tropical medicine. His post-resignation correspondence with Coy Carpenter, the dean of the school, shows that by 1952, he was running the new Institute of Tropical Medicine in the Dominican Republic and that the American Foundation for Tropical Medicine had taken over the administration of the institute from the Bowman Gray School.

== Personal ==
Thomas Mackie married 3 times. In 1921, he married Carolyn Bleecker Van Courtlandt; together they had two daughters, Carolyn (born in 1923) and Dorothy (1927).

Mackie and Carolyn were divorced in July 1941. Mackie married Janet Welch in March 1942.

Mackie's second marriage ended in divorce in December 1951. He married his third wife, Helen Holme Warnock, 15 days later.

== Death ==
Thomas Mackie died on October 5, 1955. He suffered a pulmonary embolism which resulted in a heart attack. In April of that year, he had spent several weeks in hospital recovering from the effects of smoke inhalation while fighting a fire on his land in Bridgeport, Connecticut. According to his family, he had not fully recovered at the time of his death. Legal action against the couple who allegedly started the fire was still pending at the time of his death.

== See also ==
- Walter Reed Tropical Medicine Course, founding member and co-author for the Manual of Tropical Medicine
