= Kavasji Jamshedji Petigara =

Khan Bahadur Kowasji Jamshedji Petigara CIE OBE ISO KPM JP IP
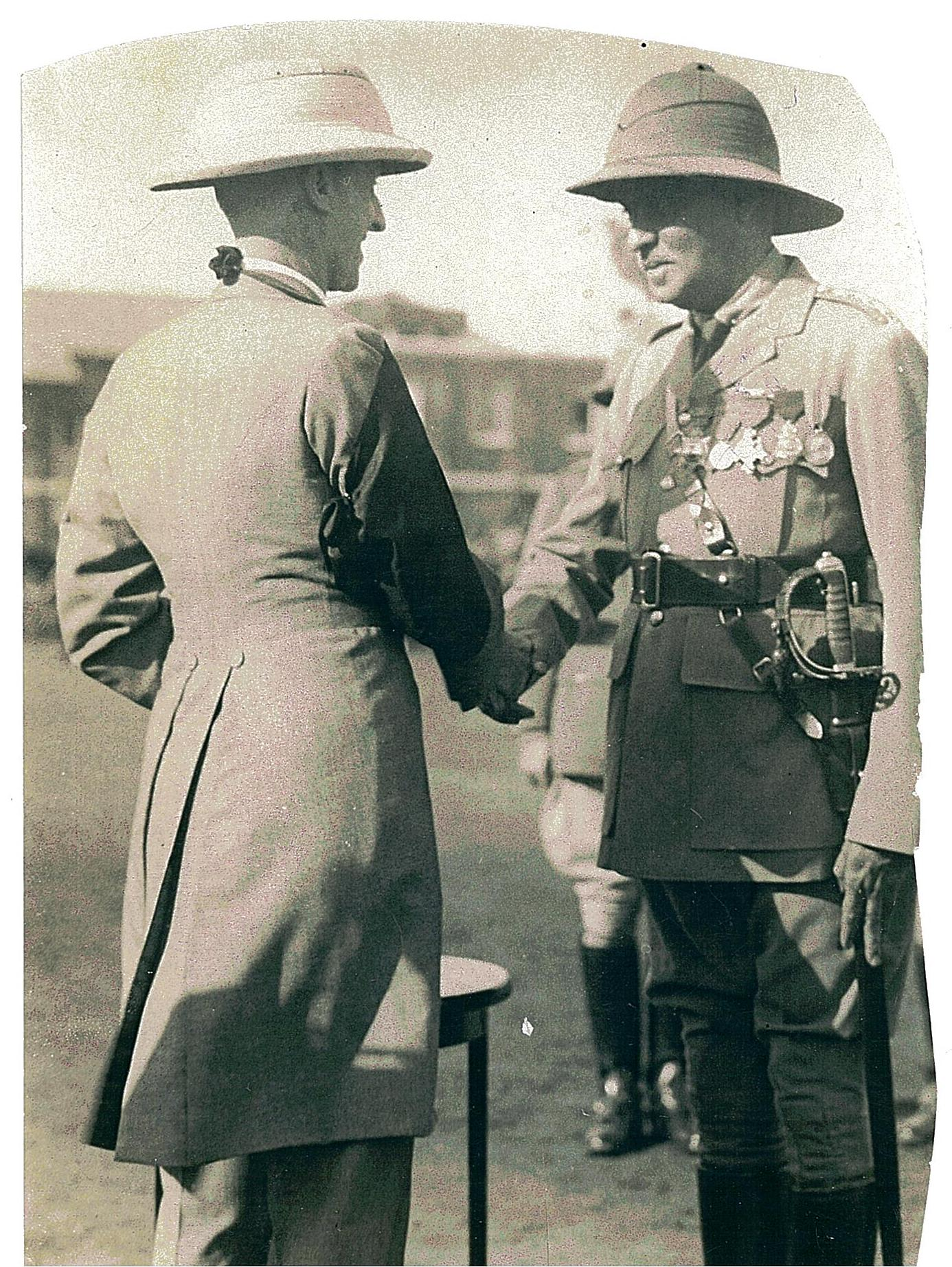
- Petigara receiving a decoration from the Governor of Bombay Frederick Sykes (c. 1931)

Deputy Commissioner of the Mumbai Police
- In office 1928–1936

Personal details
- Born: 24 November 1877 Surat, Gujarat, British Raj
- Died: 28 March 1941 (aged 63) Karachi, Sind, British Raj (modern-day Pakistan)
- Spouse: Avambai Taleyarkhan Petigara
- Parent(s): Jamshedji Nusserwanji Petigara; Dhunbhaiji Bastavalla
- Occupation: Law enforcement
- Known for: First Indian Deputy Commissioner of Police, Mumbai

Kavasji Jamshedji Petigara (Gujarati: કાવસજી જમશેદજી પેટીગરા) (24 November 1877 – 28 March 1941) was the first Indian to become the Deputy Commissioner of Police of the Mumbai Police in 1928. He was in charge of the Crime Branch division and was noted for his intelligence network. A decorated officer, he was appointed an Officer of the Order of the British Empire (OBE), Companion of the Indian Empire (CIE) and awarded the King's Police Medal (KPM). Petigara was also awarded the Imperial Service Order (ISO) and used the honorific title "Khan Bahadur". He joined the police force as a sub-inspector at the CID (Criminal Investigations Department), and gradually rose through the ranks. In 1928, he was promoted to the Indian Police Service rank, one that very few Indians achieved in those days.

Among his accomplishments was his role in foiling an attempt by Indian freedom activist Manabendra Nath Roy in toppling the government. Despite being a staunch loyalist of the British Indian government, he was respected by Indian freedom fighters. When Mahatma Gandhi applied for a passport in 1931 to attend the second Round Table Conference in London, Petigara was cited as one of his references. He retired from the police force in 1936.

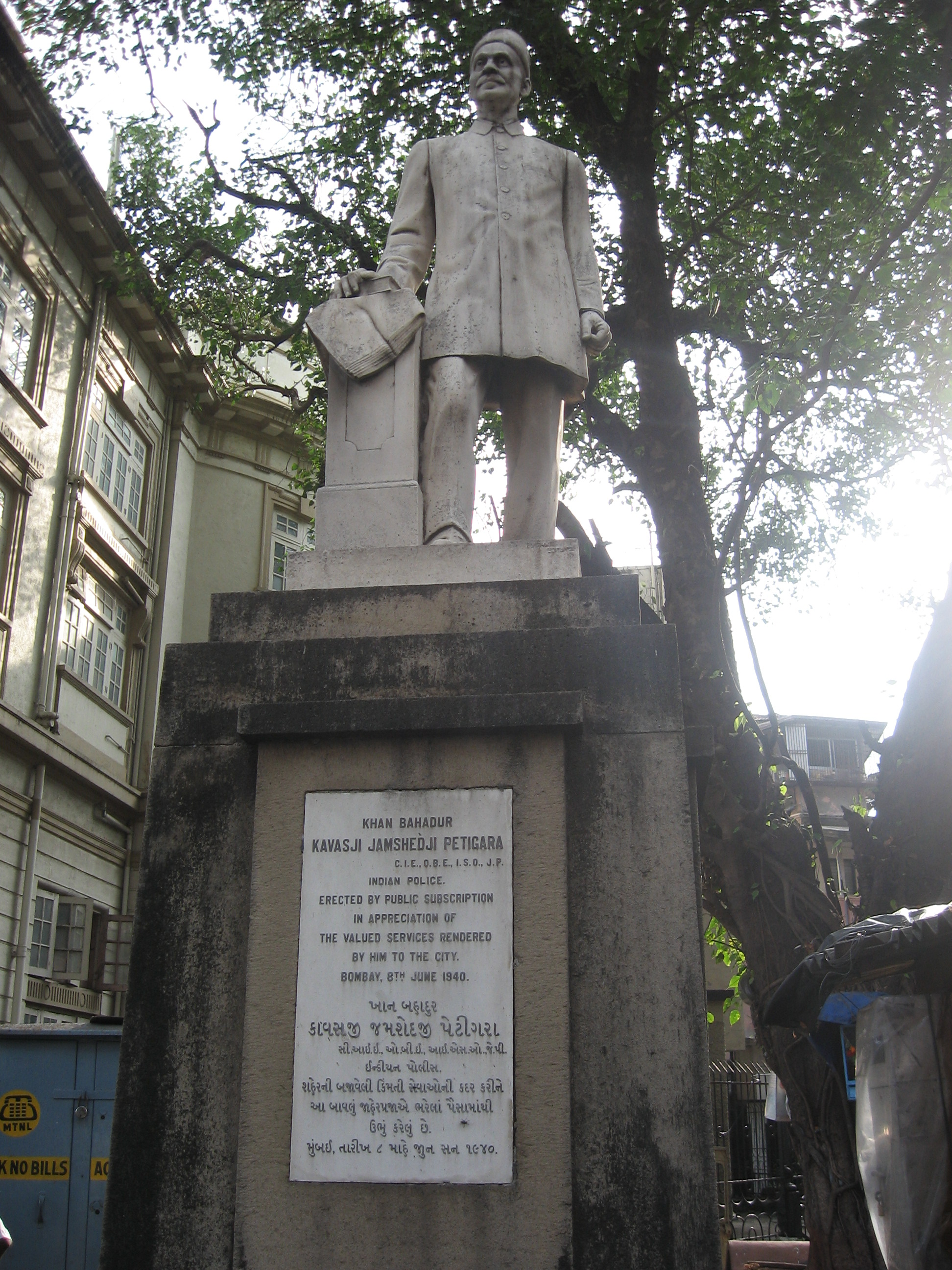
statue of Petigara near Metro Adlabs in South Mumbai.

In 1940, a statue of him was erected for the "valuable services rendered to the city". The statue is located near Metro Adlabs in South Mumbai. He died on 28 March 1941.

== Personal life ==
Petigara was born on 24 November 1877 to Jamshedji Nusserwanji Petigara and Dhunbhaiji Bastavalla. He did his schooling in Surat in Gujarat, and later Bombay (now Mumbai). He was married to Avambai, the daughter of Jehangirshaw Ardeshir Taleyarkhan. They had one son. He was also the estate manager of Prince Aly Khan at Aga Khan building in Dalal Street in Mumbai. He died on 28 March 1941 after undergoing an operation.

== Decorations ==
Award	Year	Rank
Kaisar-i-Hind Medal – 1st class	1923 New Year Honours	
Imperial Service Order (ISO)	1926 King's Birthday Honours	Superintendent
Officer of the Order of the British Empire (OBE)	1931 New Year Honours	Deputy Commissioner
Companion of the Indian Empire (CIE)	1933 King's Birthday Honours	Deputy Commissioner (Special Branch)
King's Police Medal (KPM)	1936 New Year Honours	Deputy Commissioner (Special Branch)
