= Esmond Clifford =

Esmond H. M. Clifford CBE MC
- Born: 1895
- Died: 1970 (aged 74–75)
- Military career
- Allegiance: United Kingdom
- Branch: British Army
- Service years: 1914-1948
- Rank: Colonel
- Unit: Royal Engineers
- Awards: Commander of the Order of the British Empire; Military Cross

Colonel Esmond Humphrey Miller Clifford CBE MC (1895–1970) was a Royal Engineers officer of the British Army who served between 1914 and 1948 through both world wars. During the interwar period (1918–1939) he became the Senior British Commissioner of the Anglo-Ethiopian Boundary Commission which became involved in the Abyssinia Crisis. He was held as a prisoner of war for most of the Second World War. After his retirement he became the British Commissioner for the Kenya-Ethiopia Boundary Commission in 1950.

== Early life ==
Esmond was born in 1895 and educated first at Clifton College then at the Royal Military Academy, Woolwich.

== Military career ==
He entered the Royal Engineers in 1914 and served in France, Belgium and Italy during World War I. Between 1925 and 1928 he was an Assistant Commissioner to the Anglo-Italian Jubaland Boundary Commission.

In 1931 Clifford became the Senior British Commissioner for the Anglo-Ethiopian Boundary Commission surveying the boundary between British Somaliland and Ethiopia. On 23 November 1934 they arrived at Walwal in the Ogaden province and were confronted by a newly arrived Italian force and although they protested the British contingent decided to withdraw to avoid an international incident. The Ethiopians however stayed and a skirmish took place which triggered the Abyssinia Crisis.

Clifford became the Chief Engineer, China Command between 1940 and 1941 at which point he was captured by the Japanese during the fall of Hong Kong and held as a Prisoner of War until World War II ended in 1945. He retired from active service in the Army in 1948 but between 1950 and 1957 he was British Commissioner for the Kenya-Ethiopia Boundary Commission.

== Death and legacy ==
Clifford died in 1970. His report on Royal Engineers' operations in Hong Kong, 1941, is held in the Liddell Hart Centre for Military Archives, King's College London.

== Awards ==
As an acting major he was awarded the Military Cross (MC) on 2 April 1919.

He became an Officer of the Order of the British Empire on 1 June 1928 for services with the Jubaland Boundary Commission.

On 31 December 1935 his OBE was promoted to a Commander of the Order of the British Empire (CBE).
