= State Highway 91 (New Zealand) =

Road in New Zealand

State Highway 91

Route information
- Maintained by Clutha District Council
- Length: 13 km (8.1 mi)

Major junctions
- North end: SH 1 at Balclutha
- South end: Kaitangata

Location
- Country: New Zealand
- Primary destinations: Stirling; Inch Clutha

Highway system
- New Zealand state highways; Motorways and expressways; List
← SH 90	→ SH 93

State Highway 91 (SH 91) was part of the New Zealand state highway network before briefly becoming part of SH 92 in 1990–91. It ran for 13 kilometres through South Otago in the southern South Island. SH 92 itself had its status revoked a year later.

== Route ==
Former SH 91 leaves SH 1 at Balclutha immediately to the north of the Balclutha Road Bridge. The route travels southeast, following the course of the Clutha River downstream. At the start of the river's delta, the route roughly follows the course of the northern delta branch, the Matau, but running straight rather than following the river's meanders. Two smaller roads leave the former highway to cross bridges onto the island of Inch Clutha; these are the principal road connections to the island. The former highway continues past the southern end of the township of Stirling, from here swinging round one meander of the Matau before heading south southeast towards Kaitangata. Close to this town, the route turns east, becoming Clyde Terrace.

Though no longer a State Highway, the route is still officially designated the "Kaitangata Highway" as far as postal addresses are concerned.

== See also ==
- List of New Zealand state highways
