= Benhar, New Zealand =

Benhar
- Rural settlement
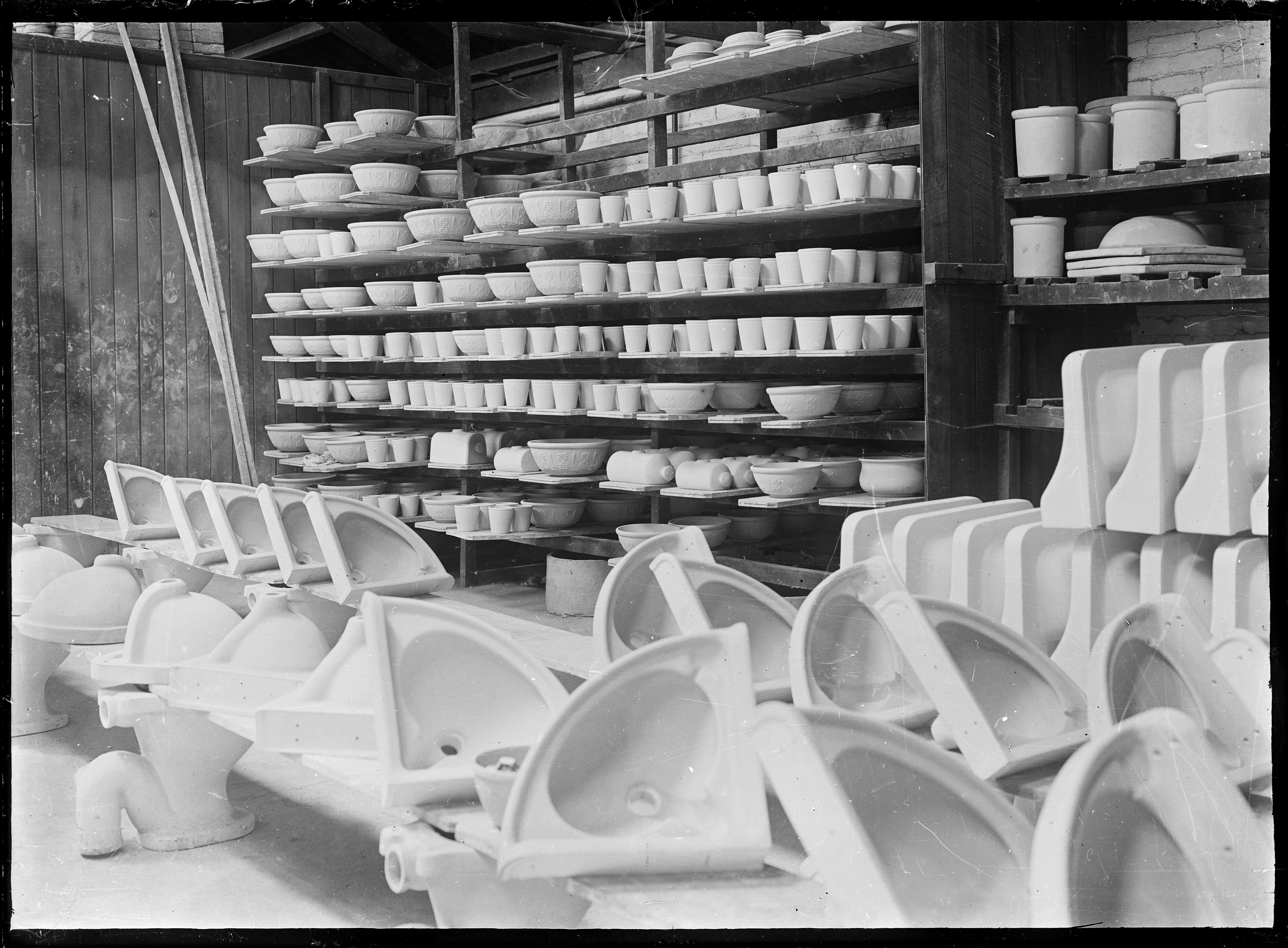
- McSkimming & Son pottery works at Benhar, 1926
- Interactive map of Benhar
- Coordinates: 46.225°S 169.794°E
- Country: New Zealand
- Region: Otago
- District: Clutha
- Ward: Balclutha
- Electorates: Taieri; Te Tai Tonga (Māori)

Government
  - Territorial authority: Clutha District Council
  - Regional council: Otago Regional Council
  - Mayor of Clutha: Jock Martin
  - Taieri MP: Ingrid Leary
  - Te Tai Tonga MP: Tākuta Ferris

Area
  - Total: 0.71 km^{2} (0.27 sq mi)

Population (June 2025)
  - Total: 100
  - Density: 140/km^{2} (360/sq mi)
- Local iwi: Ngāi Tahu

Benhar is a town in New Zealand. It is located five kilometres east of Balclutha in South Otago, close to the small Lake Tuakitoto.

Benhar was formerly the site of one of New Zealand's largest domestic porcelain factories, closing in 1990 after a large fire destroyed the factory and surrounding warehouses. The factory was initially established by Scots immigrant John Nelson to manufacture ceramic pipes and bricks, supplying the rapid growth of Dunedin's infrastructure, later diversifying into pottery ware and then sanitary ware which was freighted from the factory's own rail yard. The factory was bought by Peter McSkimming senior (1840s–1923) in 1894 and later his son (Peter McSkimming junior) and son-in-law (Parker McKinlay) took over.

== Demographics ==
Benhar is described by Statistics New Zealand as a rural settlement. It covers 0.71 km^{2} (0.27 sq mi), and had an estimated population of 100 as of June 2025, with a population density of 141 people per km^{2}. It is part of the larger Benhar-Stirling statistical area.

Historical population
Year	Pop.	±% p.a.
2006	96	—
2013	99	+0.44%
2018	90	−1.89%

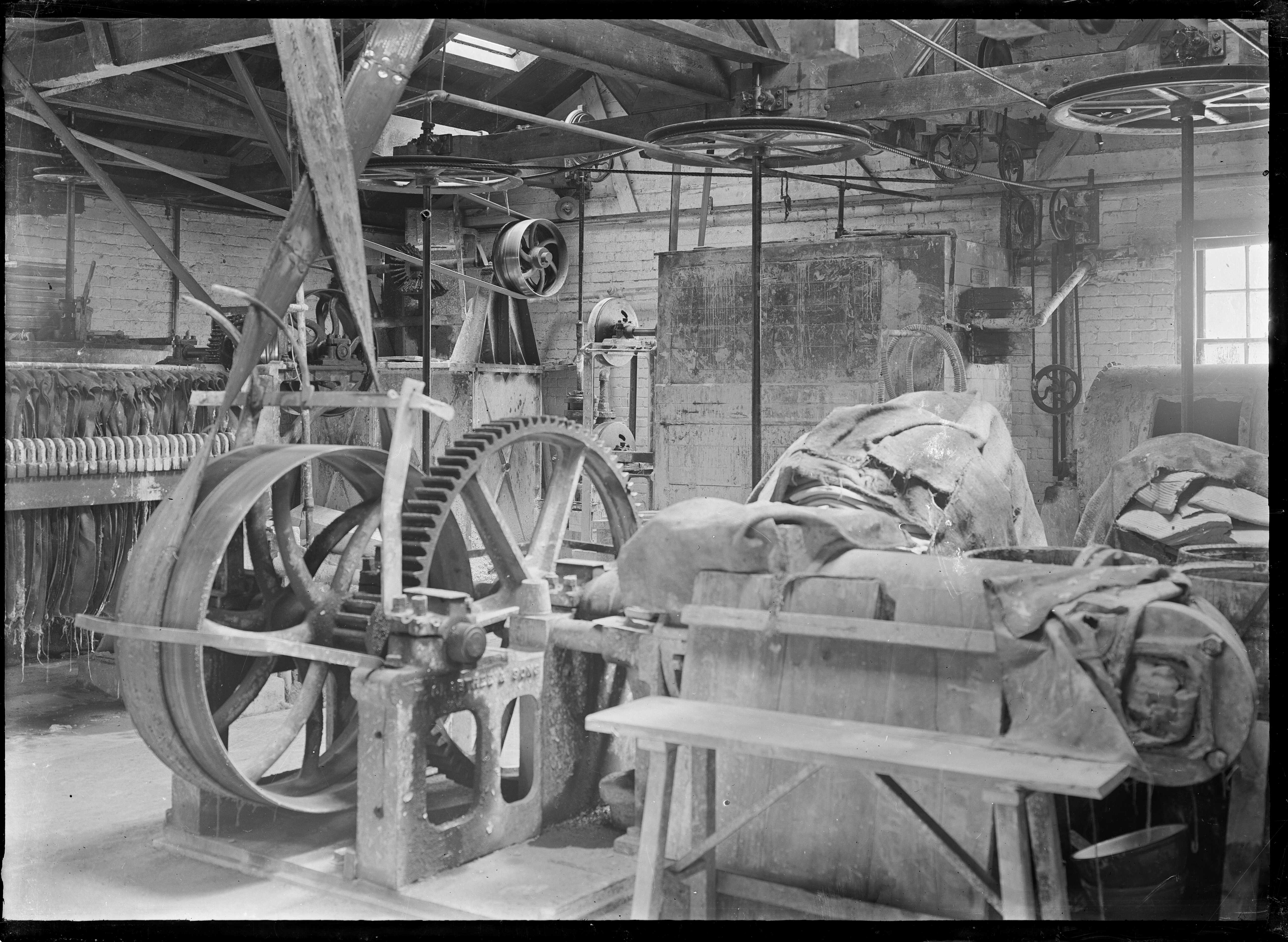
Interior of the brickworks at Benhar, 1926

Benhar had a population of 90 at the 2018 New Zealand census, a decrease of 9 people (−9.1%) since the 2013 census, and a decrease of 6 people (−6.2%) since the 2006 census. There were 39 households, comprising 51 males and 39 females, giving a sex ratio of 1.31 males per female. The median age was 37.6 years (compared with 37.4 years nationally), with 18 people (20.0%) aged under 15 years, 18 (20.0%) aged 15 to 29, 48 (53.3%) aged 30 to 64, and 9 (10.0%) aged 65 or older.

Ethnicities were 86.7% European/Pākehā, 16.7% Māori, and 6.7% Asian. People may identify with more than one ethnicity.

Although some people chose not to answer the census's question about religious affiliation, 50.0% had no religion, 33.3% were Christian, 3.3% were Muslim and 10.0% had other religions.

Of those at least 15 years old, 9 (12.5%) people had a bachelor's or higher degree, and 18 (25.0%) people had no formal qualifications. The median income was $38,300, compared with $31,800 nationally. 9 people (12.5%) earned over $70,000 compared to 17.2% nationally. The employment status of those at least 15 was that 42 (58.3%) people were employed full-time, 9 (12.5%) were part-time, and 6 (8.3%) were unemployed.
