= Kazuyuki Kiyohei Tsukigawa =

Japanese-born New Zealand mariner and salvation army officer

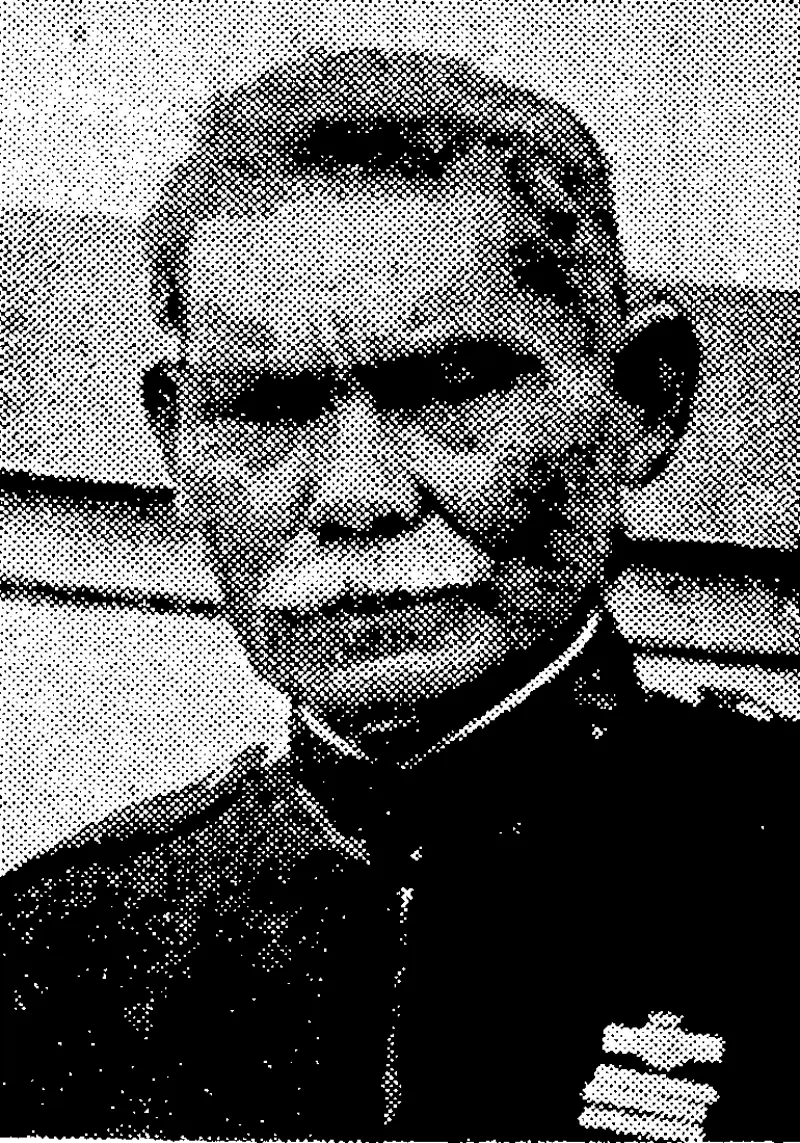
- Captain K. K. Tsukigawa, of Balclulha, master of the steamer Clutha
- Born: 9 January 1874; Konoura, Ukujima Nagasaki Prefecture, Japan
- Died: 22 December 1948; Balclutha, New Zealand
- Spouse: Adelaide May Clarke

Kazuyuki Kiyohei Tsukigawa also known as K.K. Tsukigawa (1874–1948) was a Japanese-born New Zealand Captain and Salvation Army Officer. He is most notable for his captaincy of the steam boat paddle PS Clutha which plied the Clutha River from 1908 to 1939.

== Life ==
Tsukigawa was born on the Japanese island of Konoura-mura Uku in the Nagasaki Prefecture to father Kazuye Tsukigawa and mother Fuzi Kanki. Around 1889, at age 15/16, he started to train and work as a seaman with his uncle on ships sailing the coasts of Japan and China. In 1893, Tsukigawa became ship pilot and left Japan stowed on a ship bound for Shanghai. Tsukigawa learnt English and started work as a sailor on both American and English ships, living in England for a short period.

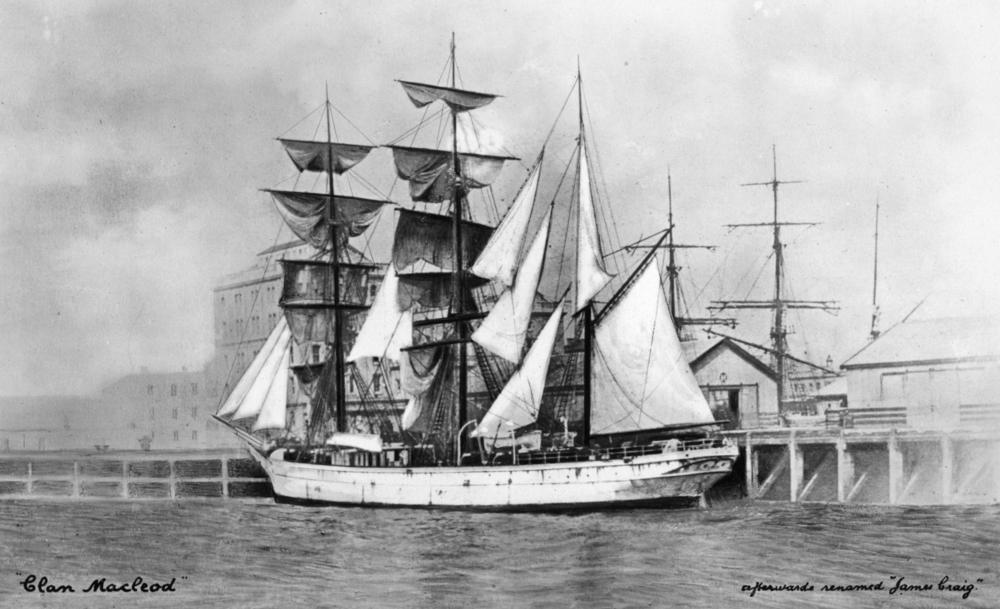
The Clan Macleod ship that Tsukigawa arrived to New Zealand on

=== New Zealand ===
In June 1897, Tsukigawa journeyed from New York to New Zealand, aboard the iron barque ship, Clan Macleod. He disbarked in Dunedin, New Zealand, after a disagreement with the ship's captain, urging Tsukigawa to abruptly leave behind some of his belongings and wages. It is reported that he hid in the Kaikorai bush until the ship departed.

At 21 years of age, he started work in the township Clydevale, on the banks of the Clutha River/ Mata-Au. Tsukigawa worked for the New Zealand and Australian Land Company who owned the estate at Clydevale Station, as a ship-hand and agricultural engineer alongside station manager James Mitchell. He visited Japan in 1902 for several months and on his return to New Zealand, Mitchell welcomed him back to work.

On 18 January 1907, Tsukigawa was naturalised and became a New Zealand citizen, he was among the first Japanese people to do so. In 1936, Tsukigawa visited Japan, taking with him New Zealand produce and made presentations to the Japanese Chamber of Commerce, Rotary Clubs and other organisations about New Zealand. In 1939 Tsukigawa was honoured by the Japanese Government in recognition of his work and contributions in cementing friendship between Japan and New Zealand. A gift of a naval sword was presented to him from Prince Chichibu, brother of the Emperor Hirohito. Tsukigawa welcomed the Japanese motor-ship, the Naniwa Maru at Lyttelton Harbour.

Tsukigawa was also known in New Zealand as K.K., shortening his Japanese name Kazuyuki Kiyohei.

At the start of World War II, Tsukigawa spent months under house arrest, as his Japanese descent deemed him an 'enemy alien'. Despite this, his local Balclutha community never questioned him. His son Sydney Nogi Tsukigawa served New Zealand in WWII in Italy.

=== Salvation Army ===
Around 1905-1906, Tsukigawa joined The Salvation Army after meeting Captain James Walker in 1898 and later converted. He was also part of the Balclutha Corps, becoming corps sergeant major from 1910 to the time of his death.remained active in his involvement with the Salvation Army throughout his life, travelling to meet Japanese members and sharing his experiences and praises for New Zealand.

=== Marriage ===
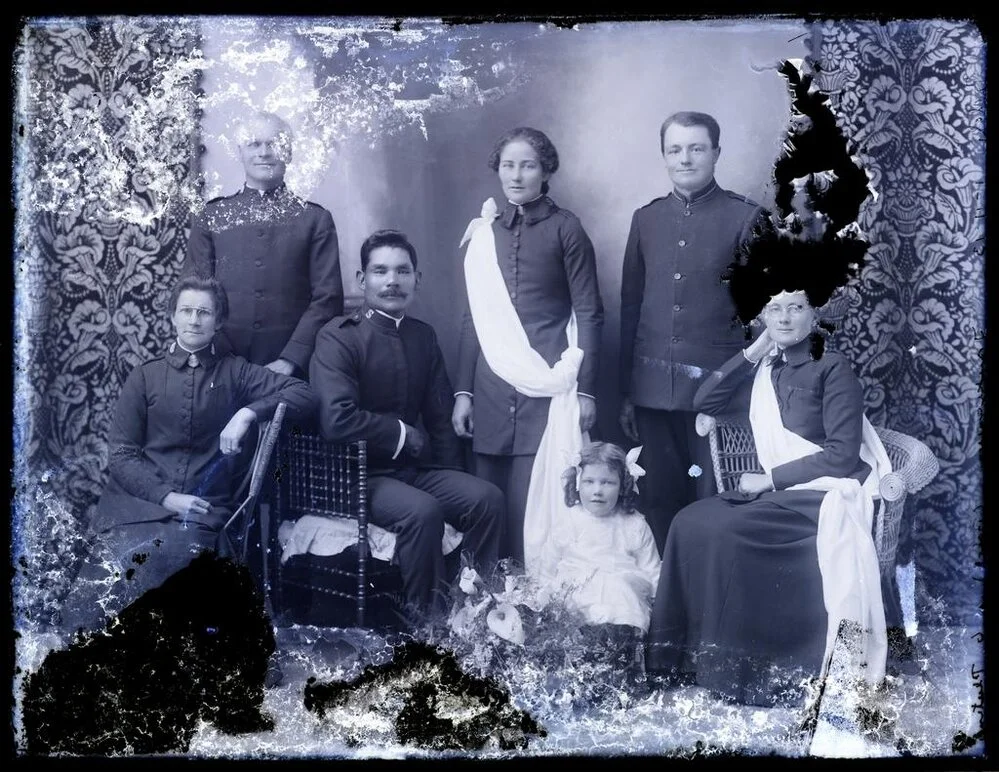
A group of Salvation Army workers, including K.K. Tsukigawa (seated with a moustache) on his wedding day to Adelaide May Clarke (standing with white sash).

On 27 October 1913, Tsukigawa married Adelaide May Clarke, an officer of the Salvation Army, Balclutha Corps. The Te Puke Times reported:

Seldom has a wedding in Balclutha drawn so many onlookers as that of Lieutenant Adelaide Clarke and Sergeant- Major K. Tsukigawa, which was celebrated in the Oddfellows' Hall. The bride-groom is master of the Clutha River Board steamer Clutha. A Japanese by birth he began as a deck hand, and rose to the position of master by sheer ability, and holds the necessary certificates to enable him to take charge of a sea-going boat. The bride was formerly stationed at Balclutha, but for some time has been at Invercargill. She and the bridegroom are highly esteemed. Interest was lent to the ceremony by the presence of the Dunedin City Salvation Army band.

— Te Puke Times, Volume II, Issue II, 7 November 1913, Page 2

The couple had three sons.

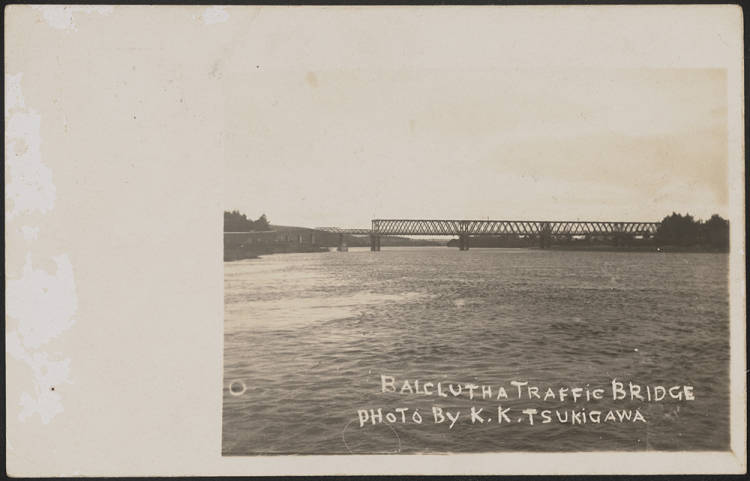
Photograph of Balclutha Traffic Bridge 1910s by Kazuyuki Kiyohei Tsukigawa

== Clutha River ==
Noted as a respected member of the community in Balclutha, Tsukigawa was offered a role as seaman on the Clutha River Board steamer, Clyde. Under the captaincy of John Bulter, he quickly learnt the trade and in May 1908 obtained a master's certification, becoming captain of a new steam ship, the Clutha, which operated from 1908 to 1939. Upon the retirement of Bulter, Tsukigawa become the master of the two ships.

On 26 May 1933, Tsukigawa was involved in an accident during the construction of the Balclutha Bridge. His fingers were crushed and he was taken to Balclutha Hospital where it is probable his injured fingers were amputated.

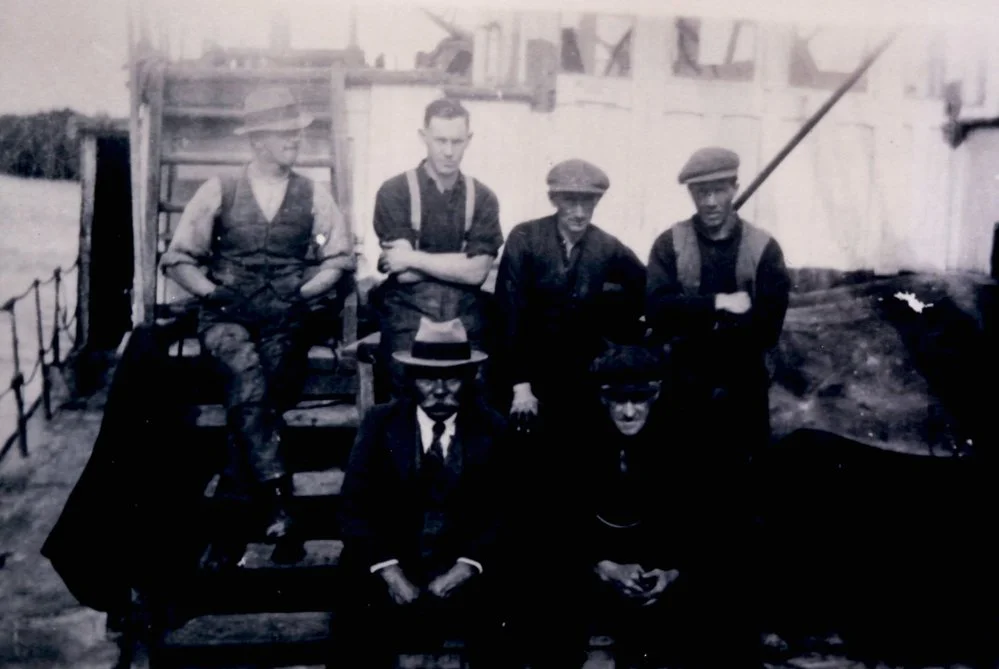
Photograph of steamer Crew on the Clutha River, K.K. Tsukigawa pictured seated in middle

Tsukigawa was master of the Clutha River steamer for 30 years, retiring in 1941.

== Death & legacy ==
Tsukigawa died in Balclutha on 22 December 1948 after a long illness at age 74.

Tsukigawa was widely recognised as an important and beloved member of the Balclutha community, cited as one of the most 'colourful characters' and 'most highly respected' in an article written by the Press in 1949 upon his death.

In 2007, a new subdivision in Balclutha was named 'Tsukigawa Terrace' in his memory. In 2013, the South Otago Historical Society and the Clutha District Council commissioned interpretative panels describing Tsukigawa's life to be placed on the Balclutha Lawn Cemetery.

His notable descendants include Sarah Tsukigawa, who is a New Zealand former International cricketer.
