= Clinton, New Zealand =

Town in Otago, New Zealand

Clinton
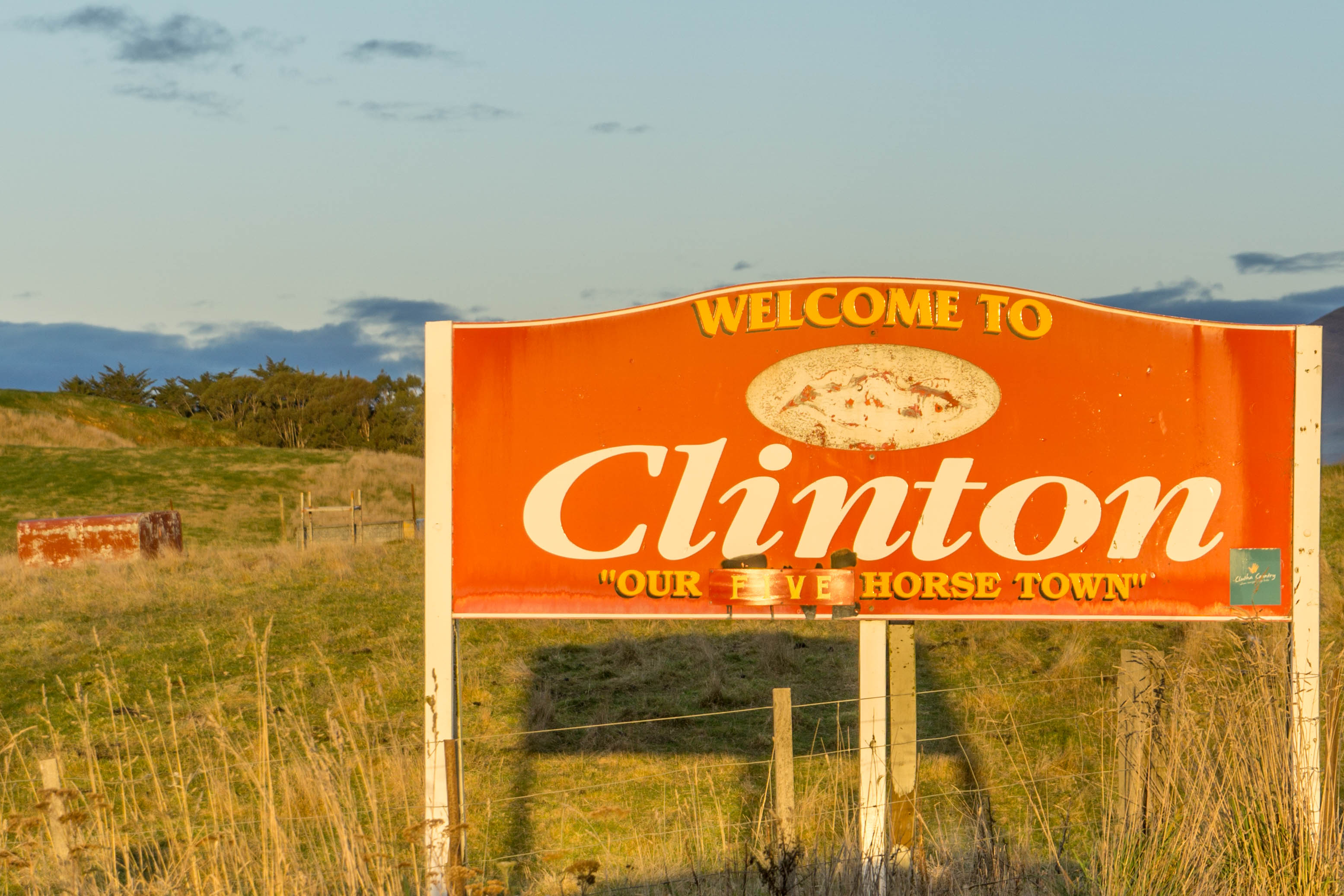
- Nickname: Our Five-Horse Town
- Interactive map of Clinton
- Coordinates: 46°12′9.4″S 169°22′29.6″E
- Country: New Zealand
- Region: Otago
- District: Clutha District
- Ward: Clinton
- Electorates: Southland; Te Tai Tonga (Māori)

Government
  - Territorial authority: Clutha District Council
  - Regional council: Otago Regional Council
  - Mayor of Clutha: Jock Martin
  - Southland MP: Joseph Mooney
  - Te Tai Tonga MP: Tākuta Ferris

Area
  - Total: 0.72 km^{2} (0.28 sq mi)
- Elevation: 122 m (400 ft)

Population (June 2025)
  - Total: 280
  - Density: 390/km^{2} (1,000/sq mi)

Clinton is a small town in South Otago, in New Zealand's South Island, with convenient road connections to Dunedin, Central Otago via Lawrence or Tapanui, the Catlins and Invercargill. It is located on State Highway 1 approximately halfway between Balclutha and Gore (the section of State Highway 1 between Clinton and Gore is known as "The Presidential Highway", after Bill Clinton and Al Gore, though the names are a coincidence), and the Main South Line railway passes through the town.

Clinton was named for Henry Pelham-Clinton, 5th Duke of Newcastle, former British Secretary of State for the Colonies.

== Demographics ==
Clinton town is described by Statistics New Zealand as a rural settlement. It covers 0.72 km^{2} (0.28 sq mi), and had an estimated population of 280 as of June 2025, with a population density of 389 people per km^{2}. It is part of the much larger Clinton statistical area.

Historical population for the town
| Year | Pop. | ±% p.a. |
|---|---|---|
| 2006 | 291 | — |
| 2013 | 285 | −0.30% |
| 2018 | 288 | +0.21% |

Clinton had a population of 288 at the 2018 New Zealand census, an increase of 3 people (1.1%) since the 2013 census, and a decrease of 3 people (−1.0%) since the 2006 census. There were 117 households, comprising 147 males and 141 females, giving a sex ratio of 1.04 males per female, with 48 people (16.7%) aged under 15 years, 51 (17.7%) aged 15 to 29, 120 (41.7%) aged 30 to 64, and 63 (21.9%) aged 65 or older.

Ethnicities were 83.3% European/Pākehā, 26.0% Māori, 2.1% Asian, and 4.2% other ethnicities. People may identify with more than one ethnicity.

Although some people chose not to answer the census's question about religious affiliation, 54.2% had no religion, 32.3% were Christian, 1.0% had Māori religious beliefs, 1.0% were Hindu, 1.0% were Buddhist and 1.0% had other religions.

Of those at least 15 years old, 15 (6.2%) people had a bachelor's or higher degree, and 93 (38.8%) people had no formal qualifications. 6 people (2.5%) earned over $70,000 compared to 17.2% nationally. The employment status of those at least 15 was that 99 (41.2%) people were employed full-time, 42 (17.5%) were part-time, and 12 (5.0%) were unemployed.

=== Clinton statistical area ===
The Clinton statistical area, which also includes Waiwera South, covers 839.70 km^{2} (324.21 sq mi) and had an estimated population of 1,230 as of June 2025, with a population density of 1.5 people per km^{2}.

Historical population for the statistical area
| Year | Pop. | ±% p.a. |
|---|---|---|
| 2006 | 1,170 | — |
| 2013 | 1,200 | +0.36% |
| 2018 | 1,230 | +0.50% |

Clinton statistical area had a population of 1,230 at the 2018 New Zealand census, an increase of 30 people (2.5%) since the 2013 census, and an increase of 60 people (5.1%) since the 2006 census. There were 465 households, comprising 648 males and 579 females, giving a sex ratio of 1.12 males per female. The median age was 33.8 years (compared with 37.4 years nationally), with 288 people (23.4%) aged under 15 years, 255 (20.7%) aged 15 to 29, 555 (45.1%) aged 30 to 64, and 132 (10.7%) aged 65 or older.

Ethnicities were 87.3% European/Pākehā, 11.5% Māori, 1.7% Pasifika, 5.4% Asian, and 3.4% other ethnicities. People may identify with more than one ethnicity.

The percentage of people born overseas was 12.2, compared with 27.1% nationally.

Although some people chose not to answer the census's question about religious affiliation, 52.2% had no religion, 35.9% were Christian, 0.5% had Māori religious beliefs, 0.5% were Hindu, 1.7% were Buddhist and 1.5% had other religions.

Of those at least 15 years old, 132 (14.0%) people had a bachelor's or higher degree, and 231 (24.5%) people had no formal qualifications. The median income was $35,200, compared with $31,800 nationally. 99 people (10.5%) earned over $70,000 compared to 17.2% nationally. The employment status of those at least 15 was that 564 (59.9%) people were employed full-time, 180 (19.1%) were part-time, and 21 (2.2%) were unemployed.

== Education ==
Clinton School is a co-educational state primary school for Year 1 to 8 students, with a roll of 66 as of July 2026. The school was established in 1874.

== Railway station ==
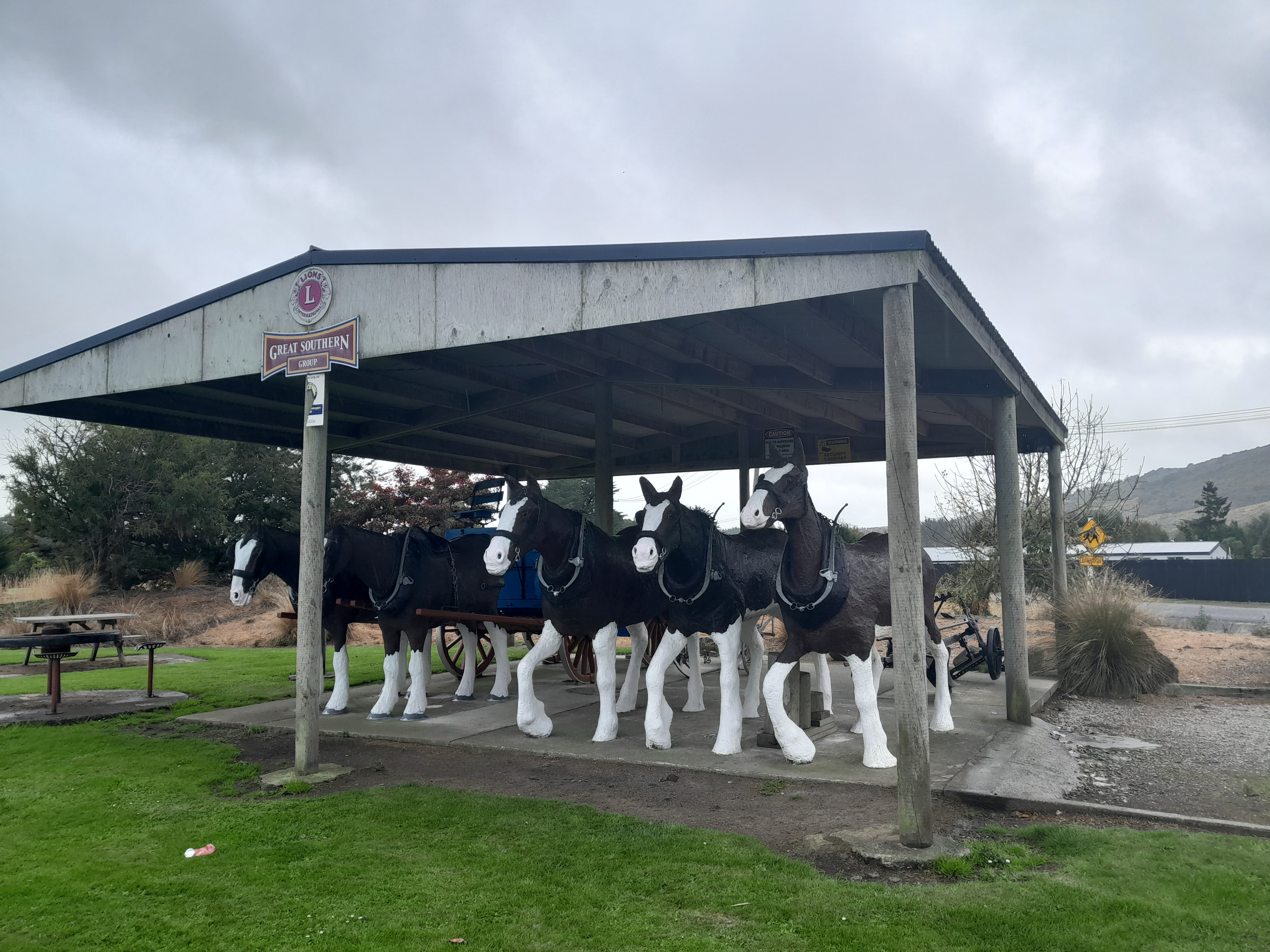
Statue of five horses in Clinton, 2023

Clinton railway station opened on 1 November 1877 and closed for passengers on 1 December 1970 and for goods in October 1990. It was 6.51 km (4.05 mi) east of Wairuna, 9.75 km (6.06 mi) west of Waiwera, 73 mi 18 ch (117.8 km) from Dunedin and 65 mi 43 ch (105.5 km) from Invercargill. Because of its location approximately halfway between Dunedin and Invercargill, the 4th class station had a refreshment room from 1880, which, included a bar and, like most such rooms, had its marked crockery. The station and refreshment room burned down in 1900, but was quickly rebuilt. The engine shed burned down in 1921 and the station was again damaged by fire in 1982. The turntable was lengthened in 1939 and removed in 1969. The refreshment room is mentioned in articles from the 1930s when the station employed a stationmaster and two clerks. Clinton continued to be the customary refreshment stop for express steam trains and later railcars until passenger services through the township ceased.

== Other features ==
Clinton is known for a public statue of five life-sized Clydesdale horses, designed by local artist David Mackie. The statue is located close to the junction of State Highways 1 and 93, and is dedicated to the heavy work animals which helped to break in the farmland of South and West Otago.
