= Bruce County, New Zealand =

Historical county in New Zealand

Coordinates: 46°07′S 169°58′E

Bruce County
- County of New Zealand
- 1876–1986
- Capital: Milton
- History
  - Established: 1876
  - Disestablished: 1986
- Today part of: Clutha District

Bruce County was one of the counties of New Zealand in the South Island. The county's headquarters were in Milton. Its first meeting was on 4 January 1877 at the Milton courthouse. Clutha District Council began in November 1989 with amalgamation of Balclutha Borough, Clutha County, Lawrence Borough, Tapanui Borough, part of Tuapeka County and Bruce District Council. Bruce District Council had been formed in 1986 from Bruce County, Milton Borough and Kaitangata Borough.

== See also ==
- List of former territorial authorities in New Zealand § Counties
