= Stirling, New Zealand =

Stirling
- Rural settlement
- Interactive map of Stirling
- Coordinates: 46.248°S 169.782°E
- Country: New Zealand
- Region: Otago
- District: Clutha
- Ward: Balclutha
- Electorates: Taieri; Te Tai Tonga (Māori)

Government
  - Territorial authority: Clutha District Council
  - Regional council: Otago Regional Council
  - Mayor of Clutha: Jock Martin
  - Taieri MP: Ingrid Leary
  - Te Tai Tonga MP: Tākuta Ferris

Area
  - Total: 1.00 km^{2} (0.39 sq mi)

Population (June 2025)
  - Total: 320
  - Density: 320/km^{2} (830/sq mi)
- Local iwi: Ngāi Tahu

Stirling is a settlement in New Zealand. It is located in South Otago, approximately 5 km from Balclutha, and just north of the Matau Branch of the Clutha River.

== Demographics ==
Stirling is described by Statistics New Zealand as a rural settlement. It covers 1.00 km^{2} (0.39 sq mi), and had an estimated population of 320 as of June 2025, with a population density of 320 people per km^{2}. It is part of the larger Benhar-Stirling statistical area.

Historical population for Stirling
Year	Pop.	±% p.a.
2006	327	—
2013	315	−0.53%
2018	321	+0.38%

Stirling had a population of 321 at the 2018 New Zealand census, an increase of 6 people (1.9%) since the 2013 census, and a decrease of 6 people (−1.8%) since the 2006 census. There were 123 households, comprising 168 males and 153 females, giving a sex ratio of 1.1 males per female, with 69 people (21.5%) aged under 15 years, 60 (18.7%) aged 15 to 29, 150 (46.7%) aged 30 to 64, and 45 (14.0%) aged 65 or older.

Ethnicities were 86.9% European/Pākehā, 12.1% Māori, 5.6% Pasifika, 0.9% Asian, and 0.9% other ethnicities. People may identify with more than one ethnicity.

Although some people chose not to answer the census's question about religious affiliation, 58.9% had no religion, 33.6% were Christian, 1.9% had Māori religious beliefs and 0.9% had other religions.

Of those at least 15 years old, 24 (9.5%) people had a bachelor's or higher degree, and 66 (26.2%) people had no formal qualifications. 36 people (14.3%) earned over $70,000 compared to 17.2% nationally. The employment status of those at least 15 was that 150 (59.5%) people were employed full-time, 39 (15.5%) were part-time, and 6 (2.4%) were unemployed.

=== Benhar-Stirling statistical area ===
Benhar-Stirling, which also includes Benhar, covers 9.46 km^{2} (3.65 sq mi) and had an estimated population of 480 as of June 2025, with a population density of 51 people per km^{2}.

Historical population for Benhar-Stirling statistical area
Year	Pop.	±% p.a.
2006	468	—
2013	462	−0.18%
2018	471	+0.39%

Benhar-Stirling had a population of 471 at the 2018 New Zealand census, an increase of 9 people (1.9%) since the 2013 census, and an increase of 3 people (0.6%) since the 2006 census. There were 183 households, comprising 249 males and 219 females, giving a sex ratio of 1.14 males per female. The median age was 40.7 years (compared with 37.4 years nationally), with 93 people (19.7%) aged under 15 years, 90 (19.1%) aged 15 to 29, 225 (47.8%) aged 30 to 64, and 66 (14.0%) aged 65 or older.

Ethnicities were 86.6% European/Pākehā, 12.7% Māori, 4.5% Pasifika, 3.2% Asian, and 1.9% other ethnicities. People may identify with more than one ethnicity.

The percentage of people born overseas was 14.0, compared with 27.1% nationally.

Although some people chose not to answer the census's question about religious affiliation, 53.5% had no religion, 36.3% were Christian, 0.6% had Māori religious beliefs, 0.6% were Muslim and 1.9% had other religions.

Of those at least 15 years old, 36 (9.5%) people had a bachelor's or higher degree, and 93 (24.6%) people had no formal qualifications. The median income was $35,600, compared with $31,800 nationally. 48 people (12.7%) earned over $70,000 compared to 17.2% nationally. The employment status of those at least 15 was that 225 (59.5%) people were employed full-time, 60 (15.9%) were part-time, and 12 (3.2%) were unemployed.

== Education ==
Stirling School is a co-educational state primary school for Year 1 to 8 students, with a roll of 80 as of July 2026. The school opened in 1879 and celebrated a joint centenary with Inch Clutha school in 1958.
