= Clydevale =

- Township
- Interactive map of Clydevale
- Coordinates: 46.101°S 169.528°E
- Country: New Zealand
- Region: Otago
- Territorial authority: Clutha District
- Ward: Clutha Valley
- Electorates: Taieri; Te Tai Tonga (Māori)

Government
  - Territorial authority: Clutha District Council
  - Regional council: Otago Regional Council
  - Mayor of Clutha: Jock Martin
  - Taieri MP: Ingrid Leary
  - Te Tai Tonga MP: Tākuta Ferris
- Time zone: UTC+12 (NZST)
- Postcode: 9274
- Local iwi: Ngāi Tahu

Clydevale is a township on the banks of the Clutha River / Mata-Au, in the Clutha Valley, 29 kilometres north-west of Balclutha.

The township was established by the New Zealand and Australian Land Company in the 1860s. The company officially named the township in 1863, after the River Clyde in Scotland.

French food company Danone operates milk factory at Clydevale, which produces toddler infant formula brand Karicare. A new biomass boiler plant was installed between 2019 and 2021.

The settlement has a war memorial with the statue of a soldier, and a plaque listing local men who died in World War I and World War II.

== Demographics ==
The Clutha Valley statistical area covers 747.35 km^{2} (288.55 sq mi) and had an estimated population of 1,700 as of June 2025, with a population density of 2.3 people per km^{2}.

Historical population
Year	Pop.	±% p.a.
2006	1,560	—
2013	1,524	−0.33%
2018	1,608	+1.08%

Clutha Valley had a population of 1,608 at the 2018 New Zealand census, an increase of 84 people (5.5%) since the 2013 census, and an increase of 48 people (3.1%) since the 2006 census. There were 570 households, comprising 879 males and 729 females, giving a sex ratio of 1.21 males per female. The median age was 36.4 years (compared with 37.4 years nationally), with 375 people (23.3%) aged under 15 years, 306 (19.0%) aged 15 to 29, 762 (47.4%) aged 30 to 64, and 165 (10.3%) aged 65 or older.

Ethnicities were 84.1% European/Pākehā, 9.1% Māori, 1.9% Pasifika, 8.0% Asian, and 3.7% other ethnicities. People may identify with more than one ethnicity.

The percentage of people born overseas was 14.7, compared with 27.1% nationally.

Although some people chose not to answer the census's question about religious affiliation, 51.3% had no religion, 39.6% were Christian, 0.6% had Māori religious beliefs, 0.2% were Hindu, 0.9% were Buddhist and 0.7% had other religions.

Of those at least 15 years old, 183 (14.8%) people had a bachelor's or higher degree, and 216 (17.5%) people had no formal qualifications. The median income was $40,100, compared with $31,800 nationally. 207 people (16.8%) earned over $70,000 compared to 17.2% nationally. The employment status of those at least 15 was that 795 (64.5%) people were employed full-time, 204 (16.5%) were part-time, and 30 (2.4%) were unemployed.

== Education ==
Clutha Valley School is a full primary school serving years 1 to 8 with a roll of 103 students as of July 2026.

Clutha Valley District High School opened in 1939 as the amalgamation of eight small schools, and two other schools merged with it in the 1940s. It became a primary school in 1967. Clutha Valley Primary School opened as a replacement in Clydesdale in 2008. In 2019, plans were announced to demolish the existing school buildings, and rebuild the entire school from scratch.
