= Kaitangata, New Zealand =

Kaitangata
- Interactive map of Kaitangata
- Coordinates: 46°17′S 169°51′E
- Country: New Zealand
- Region: Otago
- Territorial authority: Clutha District
- Ward: Kaitangata-Matau
- Electorates: Taieri; Te Tai Tonga (Māori)

Government
  - Territorial authority: Clutha District Council
  - Regional council: Otago Regional Council
  - Mayor of Clutha: Jock Martin
  - Taieri MP: Ingrid Leary
  - Te Tai Tonga MP: Mananui Ramsden

Area
  - Total: 2.54 km^{2} (0.98 sq mi)

Population (June 2025)
  - Total: 860
  - Density: 340/km^{2} (880/sq mi)
- Postcode: 9210
- Area code: 03
- Local iwi: Ngāi Tahu

Kaitangata is a town near the coast of South Otago, New Zealand, on the left bank of the Matau Branch of the Clutha River ten kilometres south east of Balclutha. The town is known to its residents as Kai.

In June 2016, the town gained international attention when new low cost housing was offered there, and local mayor of Clutha District, Bryan Cadogan, estimated there were 100-1000 job vacancies in the region; the news was carried by The Guardian and TVNZ's Seven Sharp.

== Location ==
The town sits close to the coast on one of the branches of the Clutha River's delta. The small island of Inch Clutha lies immediately to the southwest of the town. Close to the town to the north lies the small Lake Tuakitoto, which drains into the Clutha via a small stream which runs to the west of Kaitangata.

== Demographics ==
In 1863 there were only 29 eligible voters in the wider district, which included Inch Clutha and Matau. By 1865 the population for the wider area was given as 403 males and 253 females – a total of 656. Considerable expansion took place with the arrival of rail and the local population sought to have the town proclaimed a Municipality in July 1878. Kaitangata was within Bruce County at the time.

Kaitangata is described by Statistics New Zealand as a rural settlement. It covers 2.54 km^{2} (0.98 sq mi), and had an estimated population of 860 as of June 2025, with a population density of 339 people per km^{2}. It is part of the larger Kaitangata-Matau statistical area.

Historical population for Kaitangata
Year	Pop.	±% p.a.
2006	810	—
2013	756	−0.98%
2018	753	−0.08%

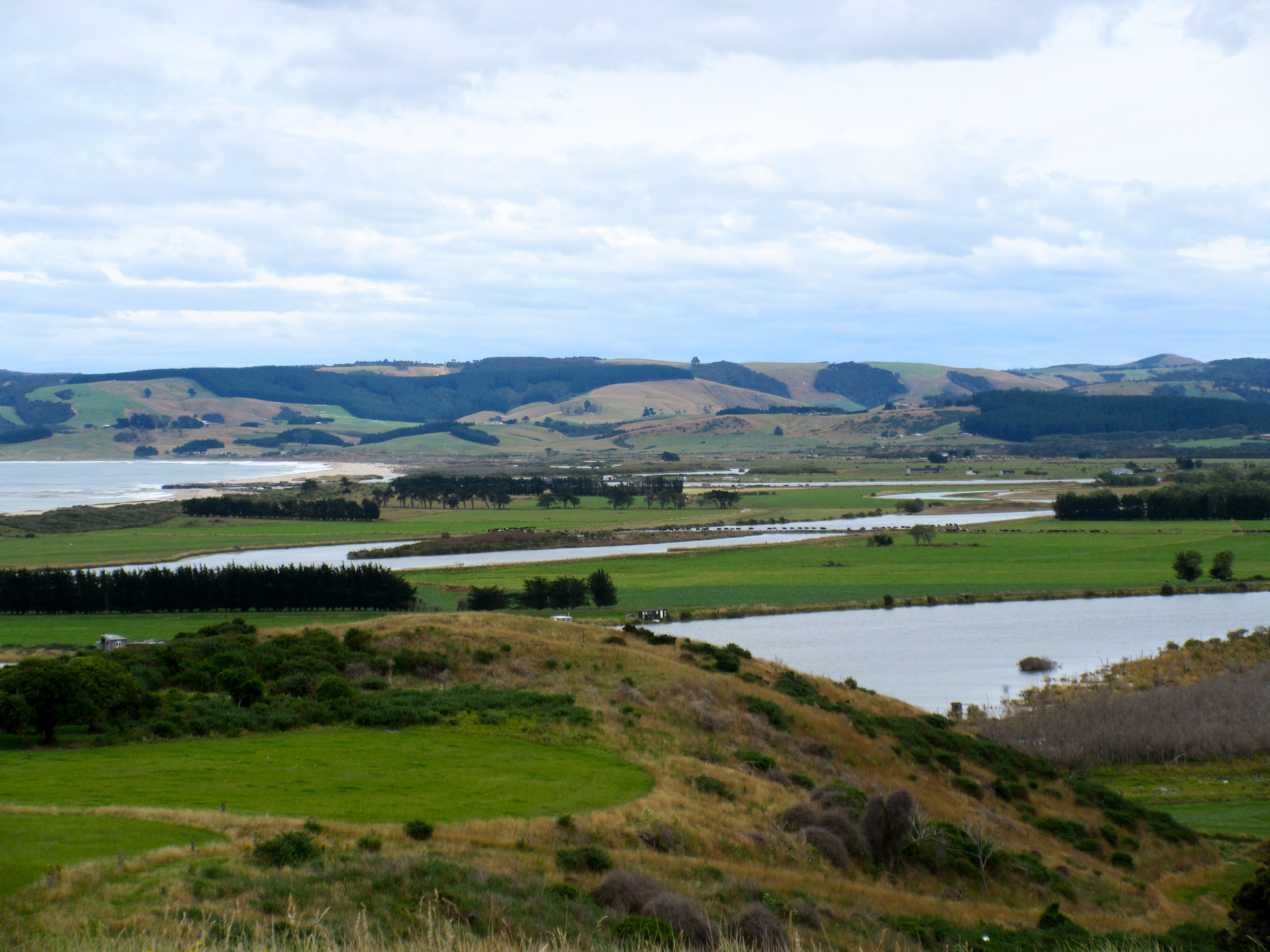
A view of the Clutha River where it enters the sea from Kaitangata. Inch Clutha in the middle distance.

Kaitangata had a population of 753 at the 2018 New Zealand census, a decrease of 3 people (−0.4%) since the 2013 census, and a decrease of 57 people (−7.0%) since the 2006 census. There were 324 households, comprising 393 males and 363 females, giving a sex ratio of 1.08 males per female, with 138 people (18.3%) aged under 15 years, 120 (15.9%) aged 15 to 29, 396 (52.6%) aged 30 to 64, and 99 (13.1%) aged 65 or older.

Ethnicities were 90.8% European/Pākehā, 17.1% Māori, 1.6% Pasifika, 1.6% Asian, and 0.4% other ethnicities. People may identify with more than one ethnicity.

Although some people chose not to answer the census's question about religious affiliation, 67.7% had no religion, 21.9% were Christian, 0.8% had Māori religious beliefs and 0.8% had other religions.

Of those at least 15 years old, 21 (3.4%) people had a bachelor's or higher degree, and 237 (38.5%) people had no formal qualifications. 45 people (7.3%) earned over $70,000 compared to 17.2% nationally. The employment status of those at least 15 was that 327 (53.2%) people were employed full-time, 75 (12.2%) were part-time, and 36 (5.9%) were unemployed.

=== Kaitangata-Matau statistical area ===
Kaitangata-Matau covers 163.68 km^{2} (63.20 sq mi) and also includes Inch Clutha and Wangaloa. It had an estimated population of 1,200 as of June 2025, with a population density of 7.3 people per km^{2}.

Historical population for Kaitangata-Matau statistical area
Year	Pop.	±% p.a.
2006	1,137	—
2013	1,104	−0.42%
2018	1,092	−0.22%

Kaitangata-Matau had a population of 1,092 at the 2018 New Zealand census, a decrease of 12 people (−1.1%) since the 2013 census, and a decrease of 45 people (−4.0%) since the 2006 census. There were 441 households, comprising 564 males and 528 females, giving a sex ratio of 1.07 males per female. The median age was 40.4 years (compared with 37.4 years nationally), with 213 people (19.5%) aged under 15 years, 210 (19.2%) aged 15 to 29, 543 (49.7%) aged 30 to 64, and 126 (11.5%) aged 65 or older.

Ethnicities were 89.3% European/Pākehā, 15.1% Māori, 1.6% Pasifika, 4.4% Asian, and 0.8% other ethnicities. People may identify with more than one ethnicity.

The percentage of people born overseas was 8.5, compared with 27.1% nationally.

Although some people chose not to answer the census's question about religious affiliation, 65.4% had no religion, 24.2% were Christian, 0.5% had Māori religious beliefs, 0.5% were Hindu, 0.3% were Muslim, 0.3% were Buddhist and 0.5% had other religions.

Of those at least 15 years old, 48 (5.5%) people had a bachelor's or higher degree, and 306 (34.8%) people had no formal qualifications. The median income was $31,000, compared with $31,800 nationally. 75 people (8.5%) earned over $70,000 compared to 17.2% nationally. The employment status of those at least 15 was that 480 (54.6%) people were employed full-time, 114 (13.0%) were part-time, and 42 (4.8%) were unemployed.

== Transport ==
Initially access to Kaitangata was by boat up the Clutha River. When road access was being improved at considerable expense in 1862 there was opposition in favour of a steamer service on the river. In 1862 the town was described as a port of entry with a customs house.

Road access remained problematic up until the mid-1870s due to poor construction and surface flooding. A rail link (the Kaitangata Line) to the South Island Main Trunk was constructed in 1875, primarily for moving coal. Prior to the construction of the line, the coal had been shipped down the Clutha River.

== Origins ==
=== Name ===
The origin of the town's Māori name remains uncertain. It is the name of a figure in Māori mythology, but could also refer to cannibal feasts held after tribal fighting between the Kāi Tahu and the Kāti Māmoe iwi in the district. One can translate the name from Māori to English as "food" (kai) for "people" (tangata) or as "people for food". After the mining disaster in 1879 a local newspaper pointed out the meaning of the name and its appropriateness in the circumstances.

According to the “Te Aka Māori Dictionary” site, the word kaitangata refers to both cannibalism and the cat's eye snail (Turbo smaragdus), a species of marine snail.

=== European settlement ===
In preparation for organised European settlement, in 1847 a party that consisted of Joseph Thomas, R J Harrison, and Charles Henry Kettle surveyed the area of land known as the Otago Block, lying between the Clutha and the Tokomairaro Rivers. The surveyors identified the present location of Kaitangata as suitable for a village on their map. When Europeans settled in the area through the early 1850s, sheep- and dairy-farming started. The town's first settler, in 1855, was John Lovell.

Frederick Tuckett had discovered coal in the nearby area in 1844 at Coal Point, but access meant that mining did not commence until the late 1850s. At Kaitangata mining began in 1862, just after the township commenced with the sale of its first 40 sections on 28 February 1862. In August 1862, 25 sections were sold in the township for an average of £14 per section. The Presbyterian Church acquired a site for a church in late 1862. Mr James Kirkland was the first Minister appointed on 10 September 1863. The town by 1862 had a customs house, a police station, and stores. A resident magistrate. Andrew Chapman, was the first Post Master, appointed on 15 September 1863. Chapman was later adjudged bankrupt because he was not a competent businessman, and a new Post Master was appointed on 1 February 1865.

A primary school was established in 1866 and its roll reached 50 pupils in April 1873. Flax mills opened in early 1870. In November 1870 a Volunteer Unit, part of the No 1 Clutha Rifles, formed. A saw mill had been established sometime before 1872. In 1873 a town library commenced operations. Cheese manufacturing started. A minor property boom occurred in 1875–1876 with the arrival of rail in the town, with sections selling anywhere up to £100 by June 1876. The telegraph arrived some time in 1877 and a new Presbyterian Church opened in October that year.

== Clubs and societies ==
A cricket club was formed by January 1864. The Ancient Order of Oddfellows was established in September 1865. A Temperance Society was set up in 1871. By 1877 there was a football club.

== Coal mining ==
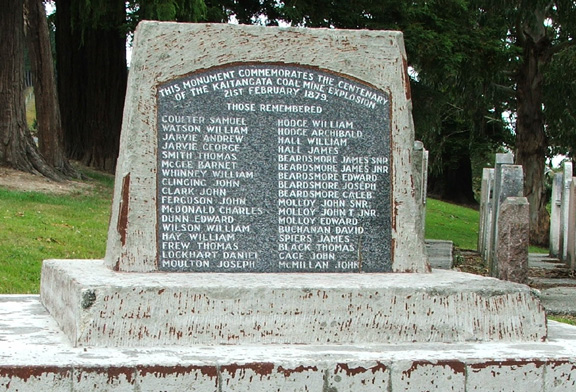
Memorial to the 1879 mining disaster

An initial report on coal in the nearby area at Coal Point was carried out by J. G. Lewis in 1859. This was followed by Dr Hector's survey of the coal fields from 1862 to 1864 and his report was published in June 1864. In it he identified the area around Kaitangata as being suitable of coal extraction. William Aitchinson had already begun extracting coal near Kaitangata in 1862. In 1871 he leased his mine to John Thompson of Balclutha. He installed a wooden tramway from the mine to the Matau River.

=== Underground ===
Coal mining was the mainstay of the town's economy from the 1870s until 1972, when the last state-owned underground coal mine closed. In addition to the earlier mentioned Thompson mine, MacFarlane and Martin opened a new mine in March 1872, with Dunedin merchants Messrs Findlay and Chapstick being added as additional owners a month later. Their mine was referred to as the No 1 Coal Company mine. In September Thompson and Aitchenson reached agreement to raise capital to expand their mining operation by way of a new company, the Kaitangata Coal Mining Company. The company made a rail link to the South Island Main Trunk at Stirling in 1875.

In September 1873 ownership of the No 1 Coal Company Mine passed to a Mr McLaren. Later the same year Messrs Findlay and Watson opened their mine. The underground mines produced sub-bituminous coal of a high quality, which was used primarily as fuel for the steam locomotives, in use in NZ until the 1960s. When the railways switched to diesel locomotives the decline of underground mining occurred.

==== Industrial action ====
In 1873 miners at the Kaitangata Coal Mining Company struck for higher wages. Their claims were unsuccessful and work resumed after about a month.

==== Mining accidents ====
In either late 1873 or early 1874 the No 1 Company's mine caught fire. By July 1874 the fire had broken out of the mine and attempts to put out the fire were unsuccessful.

One of New Zealand's early industrial disasters occurred at the Kaitangata mine at 8am on 21 February 1879, when the lives of 34 miners were lost in an underground explosion. On the day of the explosion 47 men were employed at the mine. The cause of the explosion is believed to have been a methane gas build up that was ignited when the mine managers brother entered a disused area of the mine with a lit candle. The Coroners Court verdict found negligence on behalf of the mine manager and his brother, together with the lack of legislation as the contributing factors in the disaster.

=== Open cast ===
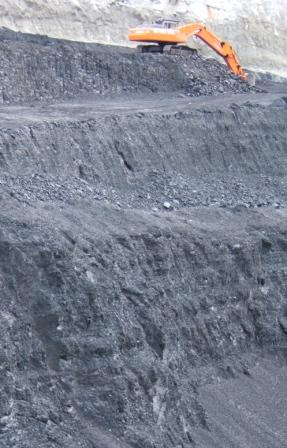
Kai Point open cast coal mine

Several open-cast mines have continued to exist (both state and private) up to the present day, such as the Kai Point Mine. The Kai Point Coal Company, founded by George Cross, has been mining coal at Kaitangata since 1951 and produces coal for local industry and domestic heating. It was producing 55,000 tons of coal per annum. The remaining open-cast mine produces lignite, which is primarily used in household fires and industrial boilers.

=== Railway ===
In 1873 local residents petitioned the Provincial Government to construct a Branch Line from the South Island Main Trunk to Ropers Creek near Kaitangata to enable coal to be easily transported from the mines. In 1874 the Provincial Government applied for consent to raise a £27,750 loan to construct the Branch line with an extension as far as Coal Point. This was unsuccessful and as a result the Kaitangata Coal Company began to investigate constructing its own line.

A railway construction company, the Kaitangata Railway Company was formed and Government consent sought to construct the line. After the Railway Company was formed it amalgamated with the Coal Company, forming the Kaitangata Mining and Railway Company. Construction of a railway line from Kaitangata to the South Island Main line at Stirling was commenced 1875 and was completed on 31 March 1876. It was a private branch line serving the township and the mines. Eventually the line later came into the state Mines Department's possession. It was closed in 1970.

The locomotive that operated the line for many years, known during operation as an "Improved F", was donated to the preservation society at Shantytown in Westland and it operates heritage trains today with the nameplate "Kaitangata" in honour of its former home.

== Crime ==
In April 1877 several local stores were set alight by an arsonist, although only one was destroyed. A £250 reward was offered for locating and prosecuting the offender. The culprit was never found.

In 2010 and 2013 the town has gained some notoriety due to several high-profile crimes connected with the town, notably cases of arson.

== Environment ==
=== Introduced species ===
Black swans and pheasants were introduced into the area in the 1860s by the Acclimatisation Society. Trout were introduced into the Matau River in the 1870s.

=== Tsunami ===
At 10am on 11 May 1877 a seismic sea wave from the 1877 Iquique earthquake caused an 18 inch high wave up the Clutha River past Kaitangata, with the river eventually rising to four feet above its former height. This repeated hourly for most of that day.

=== Drainage and flooding ===
In 1877 workers began to drain the lakes at Kaitangata. The community hoped that by draining the lakes a source of flooding which plagued the area would be removed.

At the end of September 1878 the whole township was severely flooded, there were no deaths but considerable damage was done to the township. The road to Granton was washed away and the railway bridges piles were undermined.

== Recent developments ==
A local promotions society (formed from the former ratepayers' association) has improved this image somewhat and has been responsible for numerous civic projects in and around the town. In 2010 a museum focusing on the coal mining industry was opened.

=== Kaitangata promotions house and land package ===
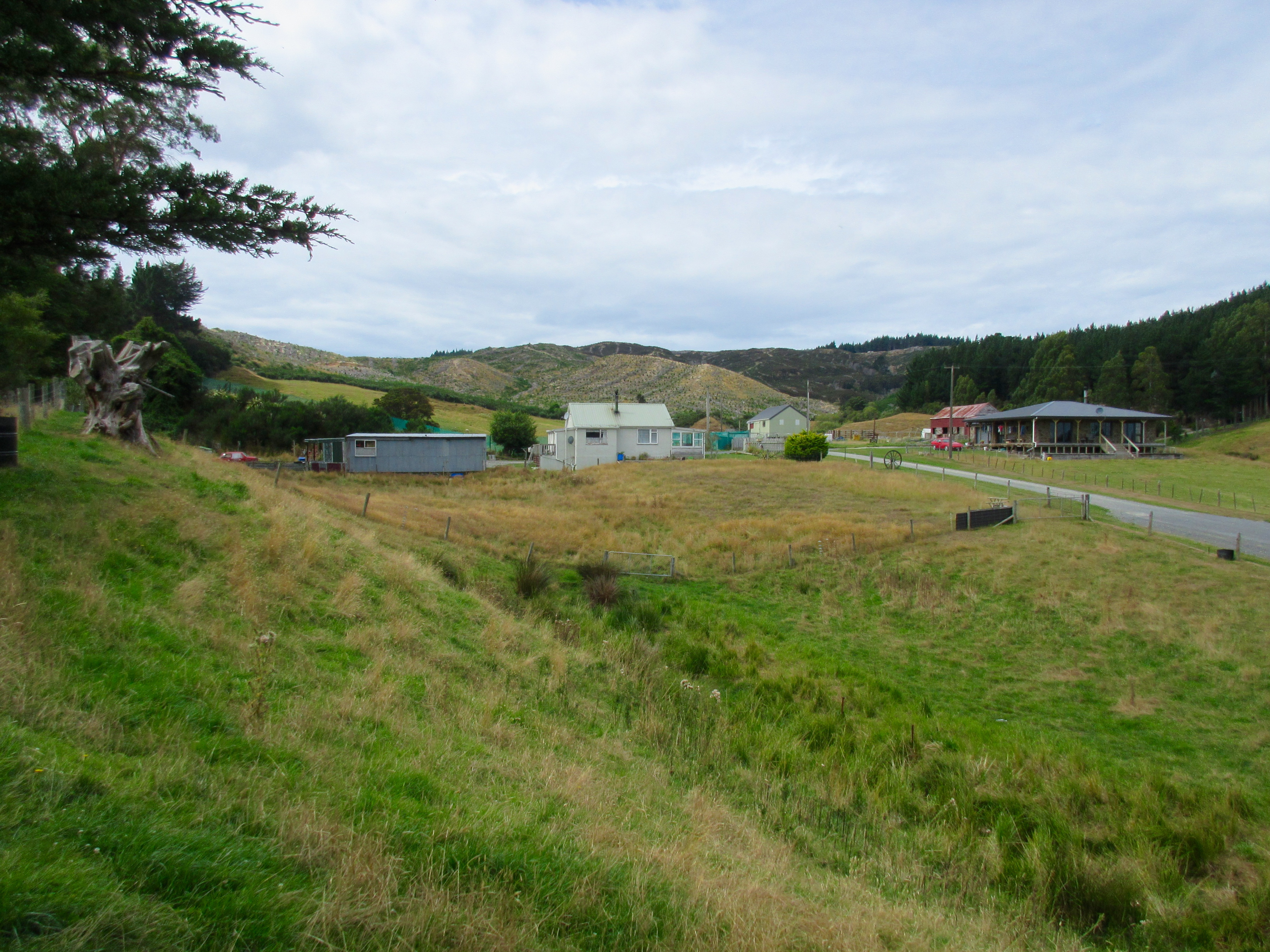
Empty sections in Kaitangata

In May 2016 Kaitangata Promotions began offering a house and land package in Kaitangata for $230,000. In June this story was picked up by other New Zealand media, and then following a story in The Guardian became a worldwide media phenomenon. As an indication of the level of interest, By the end of June daily pageviews for "Kaitangata, New Zealand" on Wikipedia were exceeding those for world cities like Sydney and Los Angeles. The mayor of Clutha district, Bryan Cadogan, said that "more than 10,000 people" had expressed interest in coming to live in Kaitangata.

==== Media misinformation ====
At the beginning of July 2016 some media outlets including the San Francisco Chronicle online edition SFGate began falsely reporting that Clutha District Council was actually giving away houses or money to the value of US$160,000 to potential residents.

==== Rules for buyers in scheme ====
On 5 July property sales for the house and land package were temporarily suspended. The incredible response to the scheme at one point saw more interest in Kaitangata than perhaps any other place in the world, and the real estate agent responsible had received more than 9000 emails regarding it. Accordingly, the promotions group wanted to ensure that it was genuine settlers which were buying the sections and not just speculators.

To achieve this:

Rules would be set, including that successful buyers would need to declare their intention for the land, speculators would not be encouraged, and buyers would agree to build within two years.

— Otago Daily Times

== Education ==
Kaitangata School is a co-educational state primary school for Year 1 to 8 students, with a roll of 97 as of July 2026. The school was founded in 1866.

== Notable people ==
- Tony Brown, rugby player and All Black
