= Milburn, New Zealand =

Milburn
- Settlement
- Location within New Zealand
- Coordinates: 46°6′S 170°00′E
- Country: New Zealand
- Region: Otago
- Territorial authority: Clutha District
- Time zone: UTC+12 (NZST)
  - Summer (DST): UTC+13 (NZDT)
- Local iwi: Ngāi Tahu

Milburn is a small settlement about three kilometres north of Milton, New Zealand.

Milburn has since 2007 been home to the Otago Corrections Facility. This low to high-medium security men's prison, at the northern end of Milburn, is the largest in the Otago region, housing up to 485 inmates and employing 201 staff.

== History ==
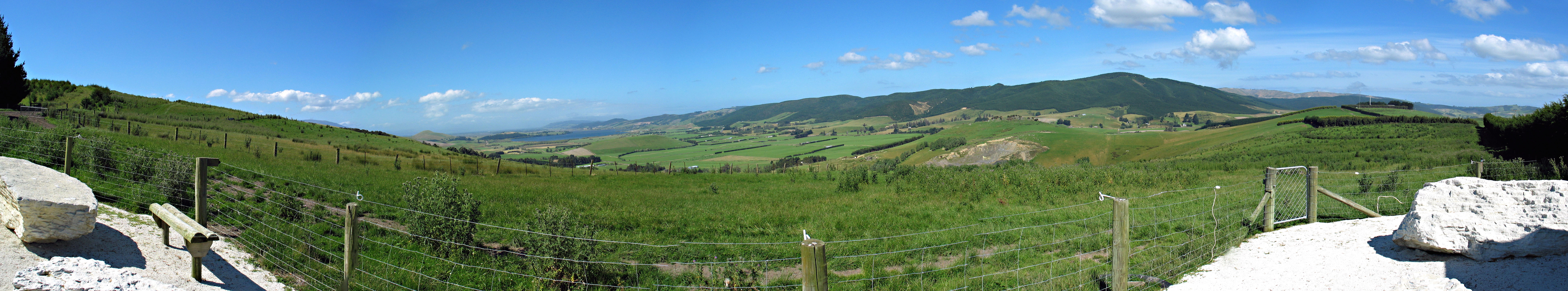
Panorama from the Whale Fossil lookout near Milburn

Milburn is also locally famous for its limeworks. Many thousands of tonnes of crushed limestone are trucked out of the hills separating the Tokomairaro Plain and Lake Waihola annually to be used in fertilizers.

A large whale fossil can be found in a display at a lookout over the limeworks, Tokomairaro Plains and Lake Waihola.

Milburn was named after Morris Milburn, who came to New Zealand from Sunderland, North East of England in The United Kingdom in 1858. He arrived at Lyttelton harbour aboard The Zealandia. "He journeyed overland to Dunedin doing the greater part of the trip by foot. In Otago he followed the goldfields with varying fortune incidental to a miners life. Working successfully at Gabriel's Gully at Molyneux and at Milburn, the last mentioned place being named after him" (Excerpt from Morris Milburn's Obituary from The Lyttelton Times December 1906, accessed from Papers Past).
