= Lake Tuakitoto =

Lake in New Zealand

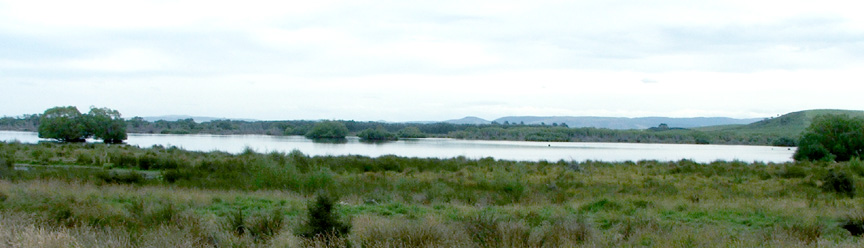
- Lake Tuakitoto

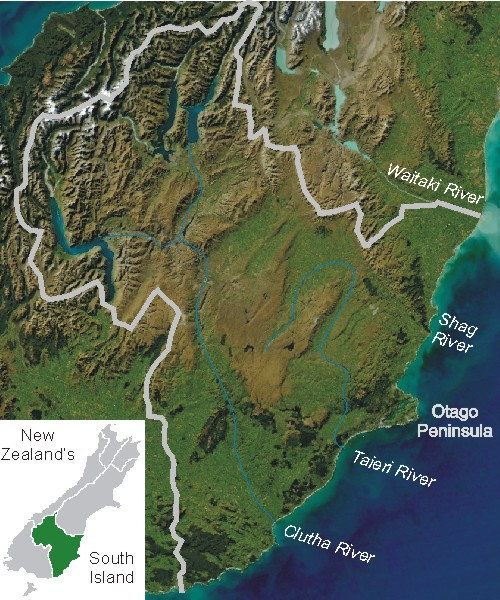
- Location within Otago peninsula
- Interactive map of Lake Tuakitoto
- Location: South Island
- Coordinates: 46°13′S 169°49′E
- Basin countries: New Zealand

Lake Tuakitoto is a small lake in South Otago, on the South Island of New Zealand. It is located to the northeast of Balclutha, close to the small town of Kaitangata. The smallest of South Otago's three main lakes, it is, like the others (Lake Waihola and Lake Waipori) very shallow. The lake drains into the lower reaches of the Clutha River.

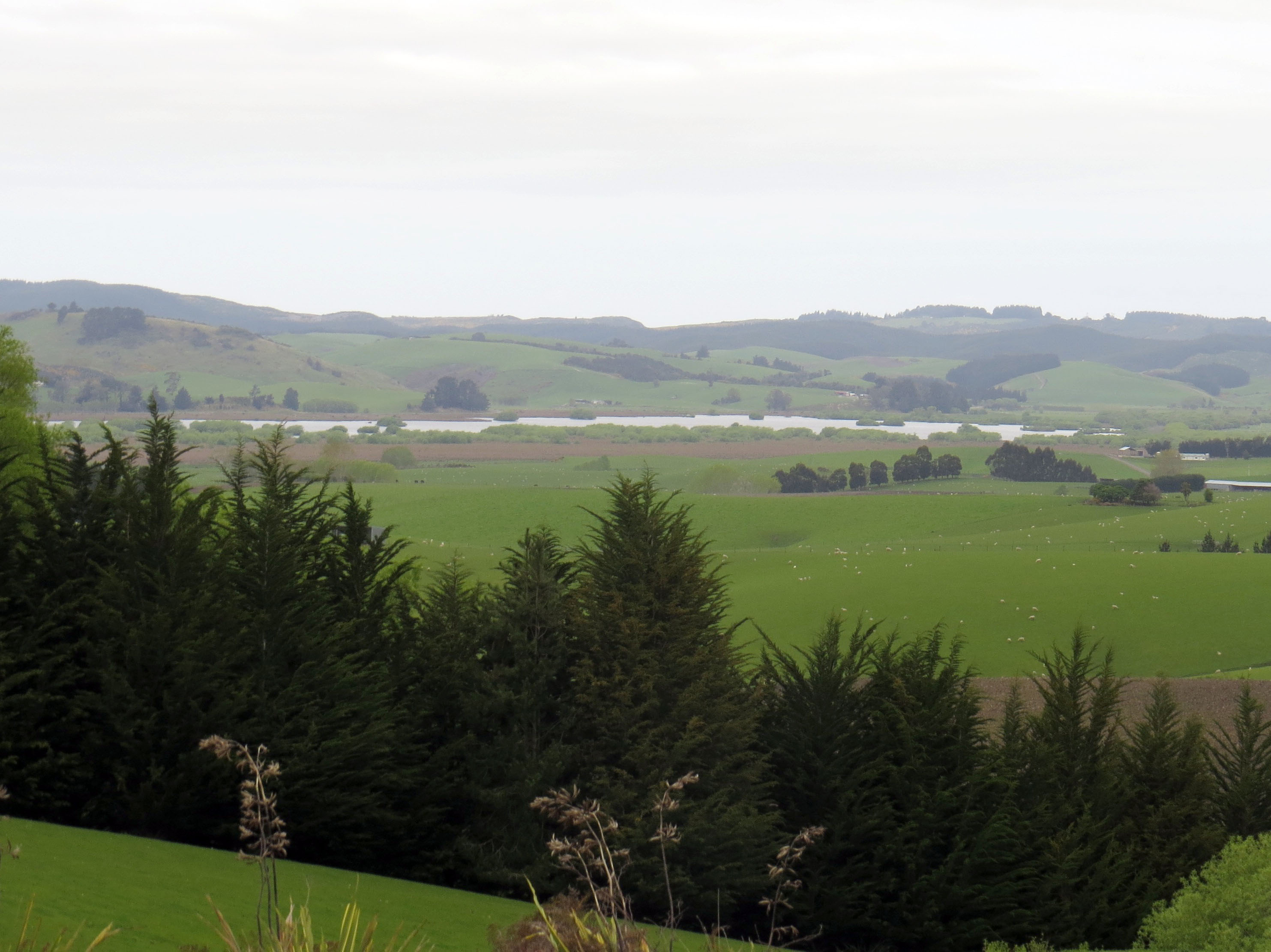
Lake Tuakitoto seen from SH1, four kilometres to the northwest
