= Barbara Tilden =

New Zealand field hockey player

Barbara Diane Tilden (born 26 November 1955 in Balclutha, New Zealand) is a retired field hockey player from New Zealand, who was a member of the national team that finished sixth at the 1984 Summer Olympics in Los Angeles, California.
