= Sarah Tsukigawa =

New Zealand cricketer (born 1982)

Personal information
- Full name: Sarah Jane Tsukigawa
- Born: 16 January 1982 (age 44); Balclutha, Otago, New Zealand
- Batting: Right-handed
- Bowling: Right-arm medium
- Role: All-rounder

International information
- National side: New Zealand (2006–2011)
- ODI debut (cap 101): 6 March 2006 v India
- Last ODI: 22 March 2009 v England
- T20I debut (cap 15): 18 October 2006 v Australia
- Last T20I: 20 February 2011 v Australia

Domestic team information
- Years: Team
- 1998/99–2013/14: Otago
- 2013/14: Western Australia

Career statistics
Competition	WODI	WT20I	WLA	WT20
Matches	42	19	173	60
Runs scored	730	129	3,176	860
Batting average	22.12	9.21	22.84	16.53
100s/50s	0/2	0/0	2/14	0/3
Top score	78*	22	117*	70
Balls bowled	1,535	150	6,197	887
Wickets	35	5	145	44
Bowling average	32.02	34.00	28.46	21.27
5 wickets in innings	0	0	1	0
10 wickets in match	0	0	0	0
Best bowling	4/43	2/19	5/13	4/18
Catches/stumpings	9/–	2/–	44/–	12/–
- Source: CricketArchive, 13 April 2021

Sarah Jane Tsukigawa (born 16 January 1982) is a New Zealand former cricketer who played as an all-rounder, batting right-handed and bowling right-arm medium. She appeared in 42 One Day Internationals and 19 Twenty20 Internationals for New Zealand between 2006 and 2011. She played domestic cricket for Otago, as well as spending one season with Western Australia.

Tsukigawa captained Otago Sparks in the 2006/07 State League, scoring 209 runs at an average of 34.83 and taking eleven wickets at an economy rate of 2.66.

Tsukigawa played for New Zealand A in the 2003/04 series against Australia Youth, and made her debut for the White Ferns in the 2006 series against India. She was a member of NZC's Live-In Academy in 2003. Tsukigawa was a key performer for the White Ferns in the Quadrangular Series in India in February 2007 scoring 214 runs at an average of 42.8, including her highest ODI score of 78 not out against England and her best ODI bowling figures of 3–33 against India.

Notably she jointly with Nicola Browne set the record 7th wicket partnership in the history of WODI (104*).

She is a descendant of Captain K. K. Tsukigawa, a Japanese captain of the steam paddle boat PS Clutha which plied the Clutha River from 1909 to 1939.
