= Aaron Gale =

New Zealand cricketer (born 1970)

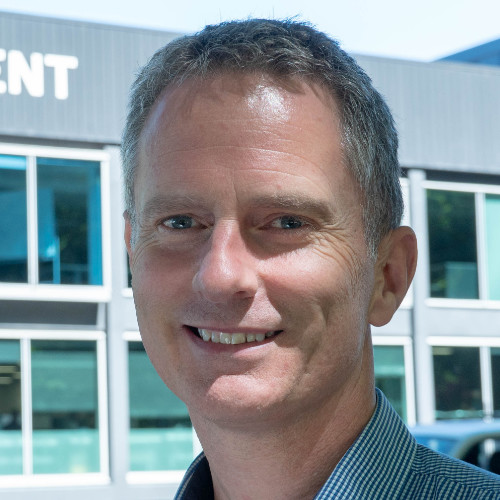

Personal information
- Full name: Aaron James Gale
- Born: 8 April 1970 (age 56); Balclutha, Otago, New Zealand
- Batting: Right-handed
- Bowling: Right-arm medium

Domestic team information
- Years: Team
- 1989/90–1999/00: Otago
- Source: CricketArchive, 27 February 2024

Aaron James Gale (born 8 April 1970) is a former New Zealand cricketer. During the 1992–93 season he took a hat-trick for Otago against Canterbury.

Gale was born at Balclutha in Otago in 1970. He was educated at Otago Boys' High School in Dunedin and worked professionally as an accountant. He played under-19 Test and One Day International cricket for New Zealand and toured India as part of the New Zealand Test team in 1995.

In the early 2000s he played club cricket in England for Harefield Cricket Club.

In November 2022, Gale was inducted as a lifetime member of the Rolleston Rise golf and cricket club in Hokitika.
