= John Barr (poet, born 1809) =

Scottish-New Zealand poet

John Barr of Craigilee (24 October 1809 – 18 September 1889) was a Scottish–New Zealand poet.

== Biography ==
Born in Paisley, Scotland in 1809, Barr moved to Otago in 1852, and farmed a property at Halfway Bush. In 1857 he moved with his wife Mary Jamieson (née Lamb) and their four children to Balclutha, and established a farm which he called Craigilee. He was the founder of the New Zealand Robert Burns Society. In his time, he was considered the Laureate of Otago Province, of which he wrote, in Lowland Scots:

There's nae place like Otago yet,
There's nae wee beggar weans,
Or auld men shivering at our doors
To beg for scraps or banes

By Feb 1862 John was in Dunedin when he printed a 'little volume' of poems, published in Edinburgh. The 'Otago Daily Times' wrote ... "quite irrespective of their local character, which endows them with a peculiar attraction, the Poems possess intrinsic merits in themselves which entitle them to rank high as literary productions"

Allen Curnow described his writing as "this Scots-colonial parritch... watery gruel at the best." Barr died on 18 September 1889 at Dunedin.
