= State Highway 93 (New Zealand) =

Road in New Zealand

State Highway 93

Route information
- Maintained by NZ Transport Agency Waka Kotahi
- Length: 43.2 km (26.8 mi)

Major junctions
- East end: SH 1 (Waipahi Highway/Clinton Highway) at Clinton
- West end: SH 1 (Pioneer Highway/Main Street) at Mataura

Location
- Country: New Zealand

Highway system
- New Zealand state highways; Motorways and expressways; List
← SH 91	→ SH 94

State Highway 93 (SH 93) is a New Zealand State Highway connecting the Southland township of Mataura with the Western Otago town of Clinton. This provides a slightly quicker route between the cities of Dunedin and Invercargill, as it bypasses the town of Gore. It is roughly 43.2 km long.

== History ==
The highway was gazetted in 2001.

== Route ==
SH 93 departs from SH 1 as Old Coach Roads and ascends out of Clinton before twisting through a small gorge before veering west and driving through undulating farmland before descending into Mataura. The road passes the old paper mill before turning right and crossing the Mataura River to meet SH 1 near the town centre.

== See also ==
- List of New Zealand state highways
