= Clutha District =

- Territorial authority district
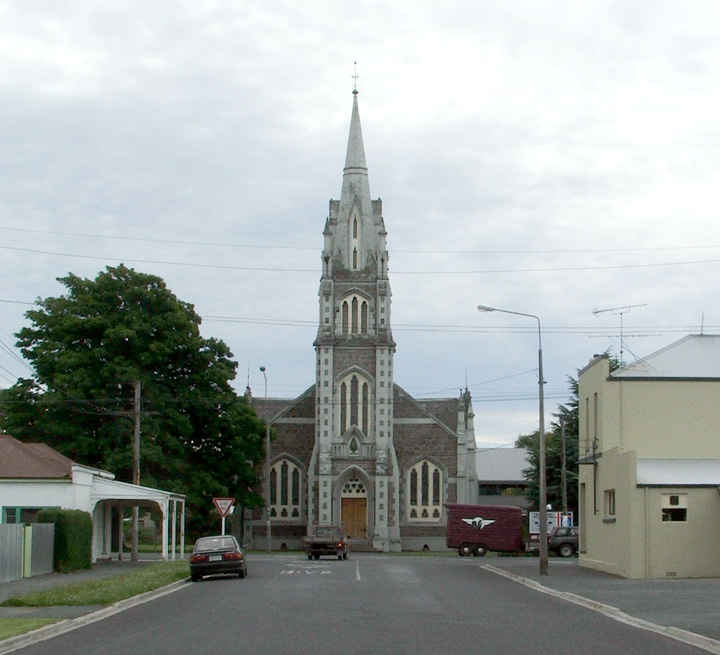
- Tokomairiro Presbyterian Church, Milton

- Clutha district in the South Island
- Coordinates: 46°05′S 169°33′E
- Country: New Zealand
- Region: Otago
- Communities: West Otago; Lawrence-Tuapeka
- Wards: West Otago; Lawrence-Tuapeka; Bruce; Clutha Valley; Clinton; Kaitangata-Matau; Balclutha; Catlins
- Seat: Balclutha

Government
  - Mayor: Jock Martin
  - Territorial authority: Clutha District Council

Area
  - Land: 6,334.54 km^{2} (2,445.78 sq mi)

Population (June 2025)
  - Total: 18,800
  - Density: 2.97/km^{2} (7.69/sq mi)
- Time zone: UTC+12 (NZST)
  - Summer (DST): UTC+13 (NZDT)
- Postcode(s): Map of postcodes
- Area code: 03
- Website: www.cluthadc.govt.nz

Clutha District is a local government district of southern New Zealand, with its headquarters in the Otago town of Balclutha. Clutha District has a land area of 6,334.47 km^{2} (2,445.75 sq mi) and an estimated population of 18,800 as of June 2025. Clutha District occupies the majority of the geographical area known as South Otago.

== Geography ==
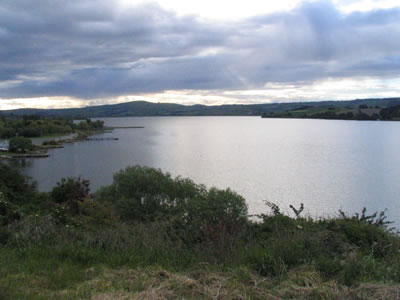
Lake Waihola

The geography of the Clutha District is dominated by the valley of the Clutha River, which flows southeast from the lakes of Central Otago, bisecting the Clutha District and reaching the Pacific Ocean via two river mouths, one of which is not far from Kaitangata, the other is closer to Kaka Point. The two branches of the river (the Matau and the Kouau) form the island of Inch Clutha. To the south of this is the rough bush country of the Catlins, with its forests and rugged coastline. To the north of the Clutha valley is mainly rolling hill country, with the plain of the Tokomairaro River to the northeast, along with Lake Waihola and Lake Waipori, which are part of the catchment of the Taieri River. The Waipori River, the Taieri's largest tributary, forms the northeastern border of Clutha District.

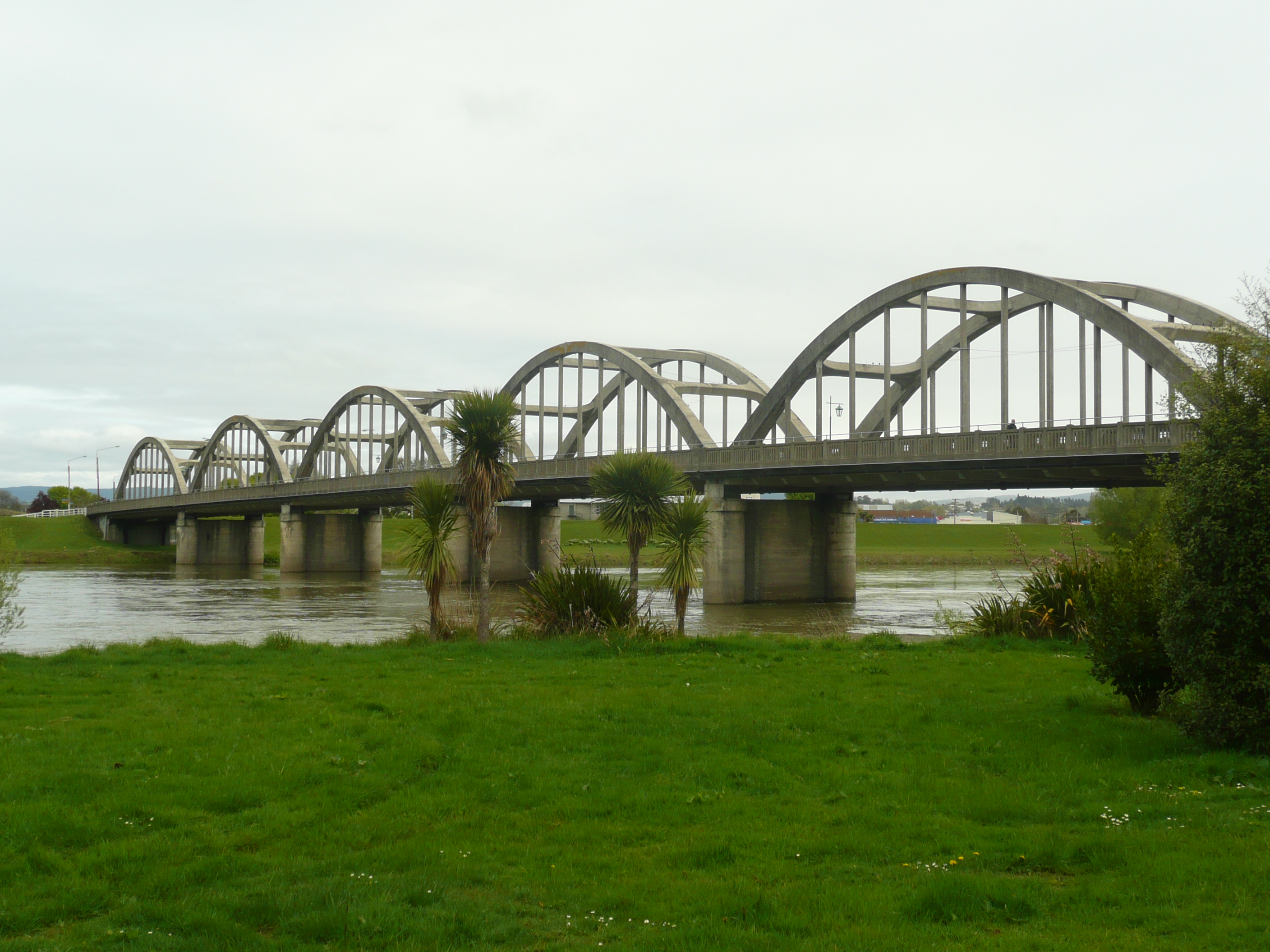
Balclutha Road Bridge

== Administration ==
Clutha District is under the local body administration of the Clutha District Council, based in Balclutha. It is administered at a regional level by the Otago Regional Council, based in Dunedin.

Clutha District was formerly composed of three separate counties (Clutha, Bruce, and Tuapeka), and two boroughs (Balclutha and Milton). These were amalgamated into one district authority in 1989 as part of a nationwide reorganisation of local government.

Bruce, an area surrounding Milton, and including the Tokomairaro Plains, had an area of 1,357 km^{2}. It included the townships of Waihola, Milburn and Waitahuna. Clutha, which included the delta of the Clutha River and extended down the Catlins coast, had an area of 2,664.5 km^{2}. It included the townships of Kaitangata, Stirling, Owaka, and Benhar. The remaining area, Tuapeka, was centred on Lawrence, and included the inland valleys of the Clutha River and its tributaries the Pomahaka River and Tuapeka River. It had an area of 2,323 km^{2}.

The current mayor is Jock Martin, who gained the position in the 2025 New Zealand local elections.

In early July 2025, the water services authority Taumata Arowai released a report finding that the Clutha District had the highest number of water quality breaches in 2024. The District accounted for 338 (59.8%) of the 565 water safety breaches in 2024. Mayor Cadogan said the Clutha District Council accepted responsibility for the "embarrassing" report.

== Demographics ==
The most populous town in Clutha District is Balclutha, which lies 81 km south of Dunedin by road. Balclutha's population was 4,460 in June 2025. Other towns are Milton (pop. 2,120), Kaitangata, Tapanui, Lawrence, Owaka, Stirling, Clinton, Kaka Point, and Benhar.

Clutha District covers 6,334.54 km^{2} (2,445.78 sq mi) and had a population of 18,800 as of June 2025, with a population density of 3.0 people per km^{2}.

Historical population
Year	Pop.	±% p.a.
2006	16,839	—
2013	16,890	+0.04%
2018	17,667	+0.90%
2023	18,315	+0.72%

Clutha District had a population of 18,315 in the 2023 New Zealand census, an increase of 648 people (3.7%) since the 2018 census, and an increase of 1,425 people (8.4%) since the 2013 census. There were 9,528 males, 8,745 females and 42 people of other genders in 7,386 dwellings. 1.9% of people identified as LGBTIQ+. The median age was 42.7 years (compared with 38.1 years nationally). There were 3,408 people (18.6%) aged under 15 years, 2,943 (16.1%) aged 15 to 29, 8,436 (46.1%) aged 30 to 64, and 3,528 (19.3%) aged 65 or older.

People could identify as more than one ethnicity. The results were 86.9% European (Pākehā); 13.9% Māori; 3.7% Pasifika; 4.5% Asian; 0.6% Middle Eastern, Latin American and African New Zealanders (MELAA); and 3.4% other, which includes people giving their ethnicity as "New Zealander". English was spoken by 97.4%, Māori language by 2.2%, Samoan by 1.8% and other languages by 5.7%. No language could be spoken by 2.0% (e.g. too young to talk). New Zealand Sign Language was known by 0.5%. The percentage of people born overseas was 13.8, compared with 28.8% nationally.

Religious affiliations were 30.2% Christian, 0.3% Hindu, 0.4% Islam, 0.4% Māori religious beliefs, 0.5% Buddhist, 0.5% New Age, and 0.9% other religions. People who answered that they had no religion were 58.2%, and 8.6% of people did not answer the census question.

Of those at least 15 years old, 1,545 (10.4%) people had a bachelor's or higher degree, 8,538 (57.3%) had a post-high school certificate or diploma, and 4,386 (29.4%) people exclusively held high school qualifications. The median income was $39,000, compared with $41,500 nationally. 936 people (6.3%) earned over $100,000 compared to 12.1% nationally. The employment status of those at least 15 was that 7,812 (52.4%) people were employed full-time, 2,184 (14.7%) were part-time, and 285 (1.9%) were unemployed.

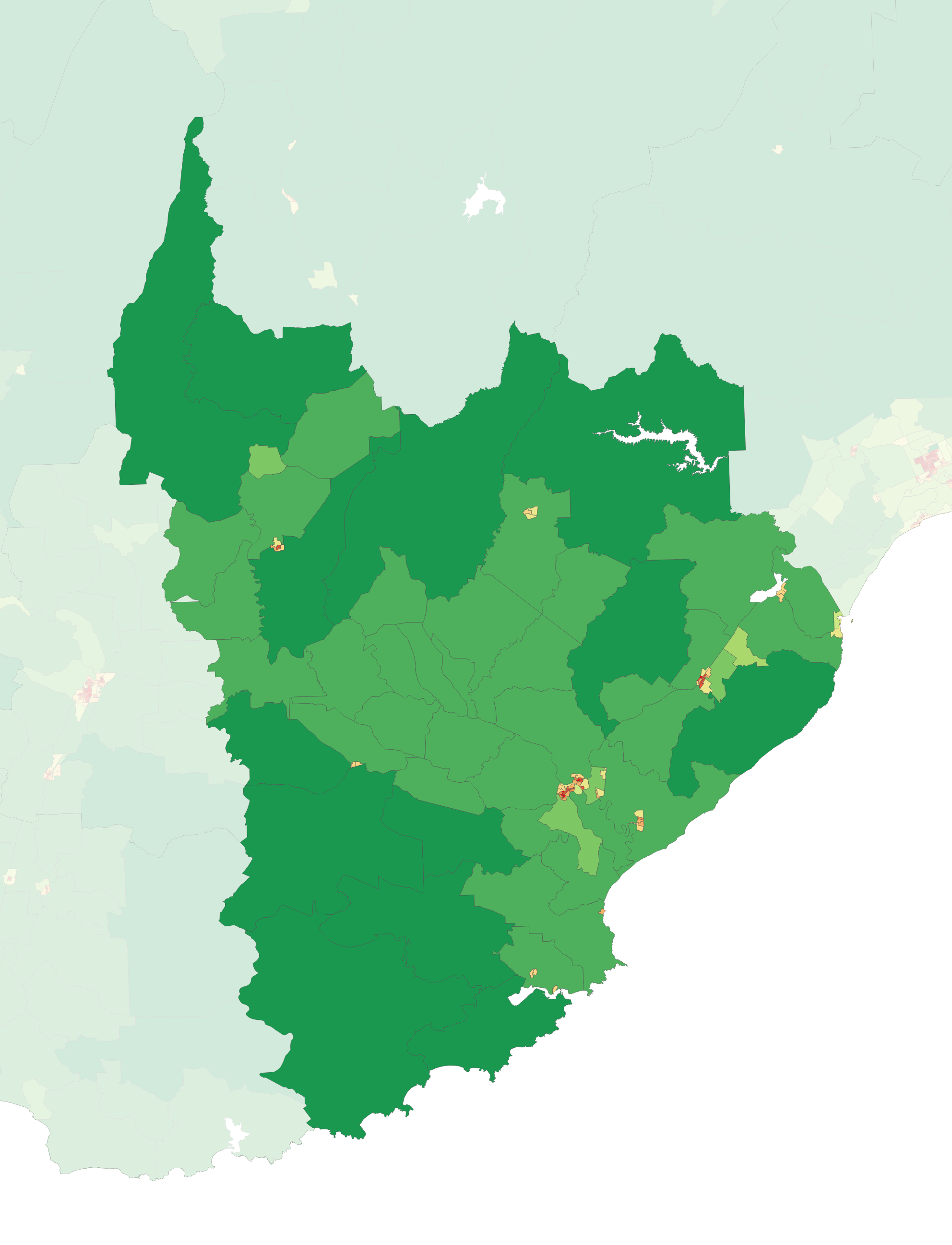
Population density in the 2023 census

Individual wards
Name	Area (km^{2})	Population	Density (per km^{2})	Dwellings	Median age	Median income
West Otago	1,374.72	2,244	1.63	915	40.9 years	$41,800
Clinton	839.70	1,200	1.43	468	36.6 years	$40,400
Lawrence-Tuapeka	1,277.63	1,260	0.99	552	49.1 years	$32,600
Balclutha	124.68	5,166	41.43	2,085	41.7 years	$40,500
Catlins	1,072.98	1,422	1.33	654	49.2 years	$37,300
Bruce	777.38	4,563	5.87	1,776	44.8 years	$35,300
Kaitangata-Matau	163.68	1,161	7.09	462	41.5 years	$39,700
Clutha Valley	703.77	1,296	1.84	468	36.2 years	$49,600
New Zealand					38.1 years	$41,500

== See also ==
- List of historic places in Clutha District
