= Koau and Matau Rivers =

Distributary of New Zealand's Clutha River

Coordinates: 46°14′40″S 169°45′20″E

The Koau and Matau Rivers, also called the Koau and Matau Branches, are the two distributaries of New Zealand's Clutha River. The two distributaries split immediately to the southeast of the town of Balclutha, at which point the more northerly branch becomes the Matau and the more southerly becomes the Koau. The two branches both flow generally southeast to reach the Pacific Ocean, surrounding the island of Inch Clutha. A small silty channel connects the two rivers close to their mouths, creating a smaller unnamed island to the south of Inch Clutha.

The two rivers are named from a Māori myth; the two branches were a husband and wife named Koau and Matau respectively. The point where the two waters flow into one another was known as Wai-hakirara, literally singing waters, because of the happiness of their meeting. The name Matau is likely a corruption of the name Mata-au, meaning eddying currents, which is the Māori language name for the Clutha River overall. The name Koau possibly relates to the pied shag Phalacrocorax varius, for which a Māori name is koau.

Both branches of the Clutha are prone to flooding, and have meandering courses. Both have also formed numerous oxbow lakes. The Matau is considerably more wandering, hence its greater length of 26 kilometres (16 mi). The town of Kaitangata lies on the eastern (mainland) bank of the Matau.

Whereas the path of the Matau is predominantly southeast throughout its course, the Koau turns initially westward, flowing past the southern edge of Balclutha. After 2 kilometres (1.2 mi) its path turns to the southeast, in which direction it flows for the remainder of its 14 kilometres (8.7 mi) length. The settlements of Finegand and Otanomomo lie close to its western (mainland) shore.

There are several small islands in the Koau, the largest of which is Shaws Island, a 500-metre (550 yd) long islet surrounded by a stream which is slowly becoming an oxbow.
