= Balclutha Road Bridge =

Bridge in Balclutha, Otago, New Zealand

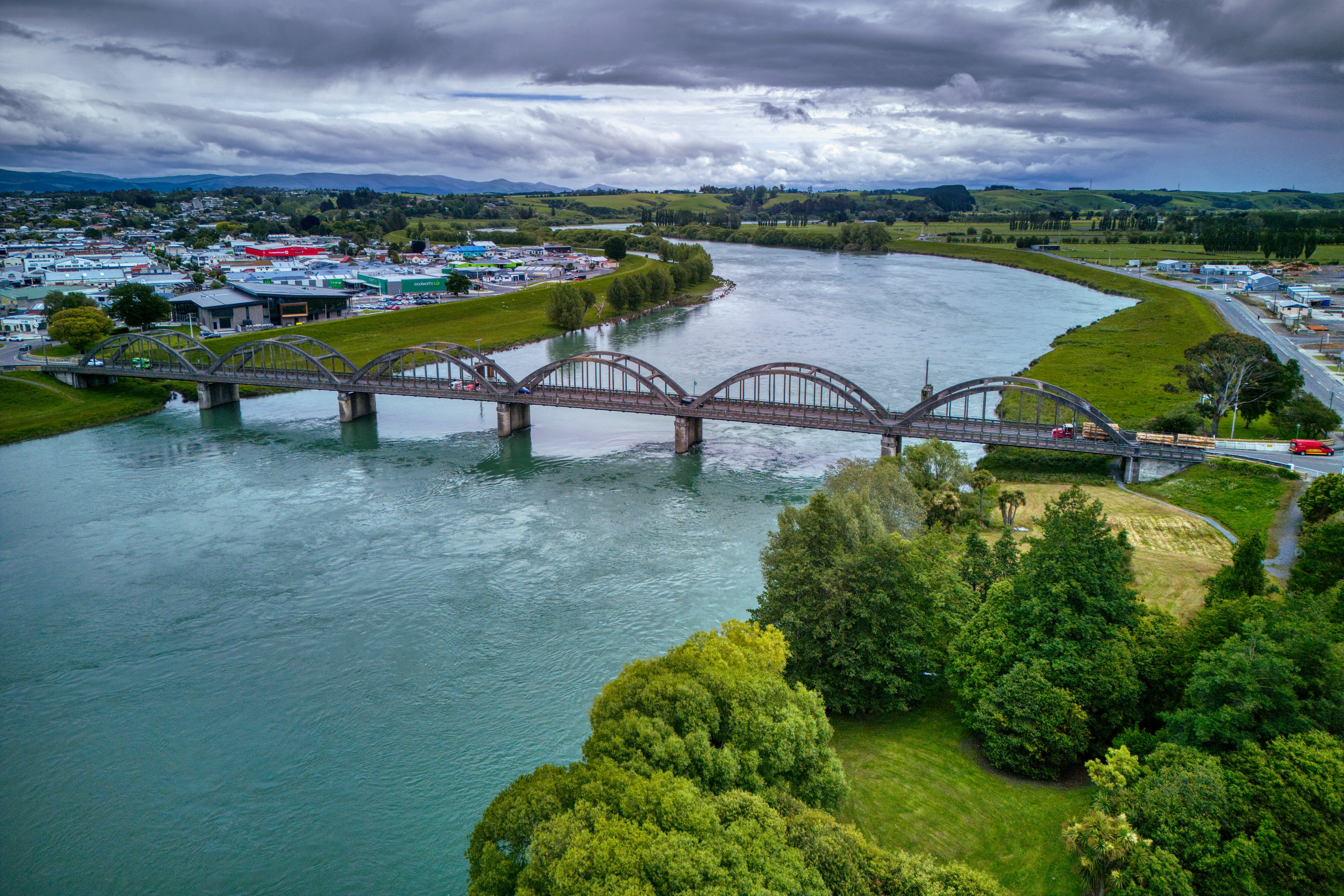
- Coordinates: 46°14′09″S 169°44′42″E
- Carries: Motor vehicles, pedestrians, cyclists
- Crosses: Clutha River
- Locale: Balclutha, Otago, New Zealand
- Maintained by: NZ Transport Agency

Characteristics
- Total length: 244.1 metres (801 ft)

History
- Construction start: 1933
- Construction end: 1935

Heritage New Zealand – Category 1
- Designated: 13-Dec-1990
- Reference no.: 5180

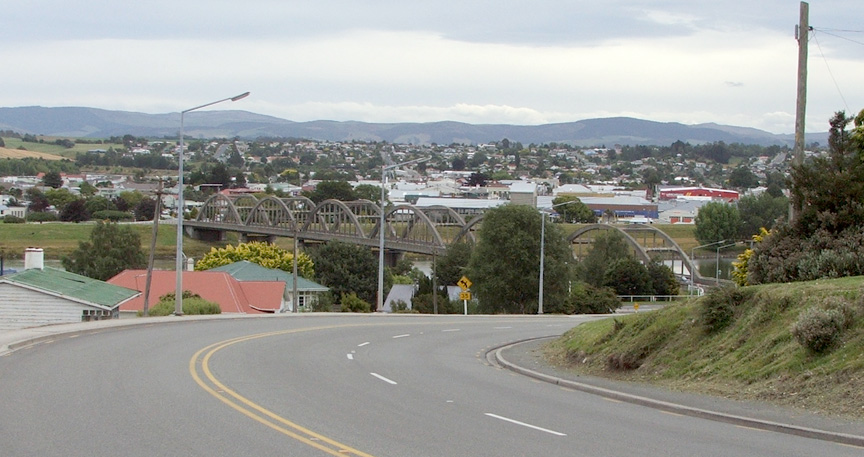
Balclutha Road Bridge is visible in the centre of this view looking south across Balclutha.

The Balclutha Road Bridge, which spans the Clutha River in Balclutha, South Otago, New Zealand, is one of the best-known road bridges in New Zealand's South Island. The bridge is often simply known as "The Clutha Bridge", despite the fact that there are numerous bridges across the country's second longest river.

Built between 1933 and 1935, this bowstring bridge was designed by W. L. Newnham to be earthquake and flood resistant, thereby safeguarding it against the two most common natural disasters to occur in southern New Zealand.

The bridge is built from reinforced concrete, with six parabolic curved spans, each of 36.6 metres in length, and a total bridge length of 244.1 metres. A carriageway of 6.7 metres width is flanked on either side by a footpath of 1.4 metres; its total width is 11.8 metres. The bridge carries the South Island's principal highway, State Highway 1 on its route between Dunedin and Invercargill.

The bridge is the third road bridge to stand at or close to this spot. The first, constructed in 1868, was destroyed in massive floods ten years later when a bridge situated upstream at Beaumont was swept downriver and collided with it. A second bridge was constructed in 1881, but was unsuitable for the needs of motorised transport and was eventually replaced by the current structure.

On 13 December 1990 the Balclutha Road Bridge was classified as a Category I Historic Place by the New Zealand Historic Places Trust.

Another bridge, the Balclutha Rail Bridge, stands several hundred metres downstream.
