= Inch Clutha =

Island downstream from Balclutha in the South Island of New Zealand

Coordinates: 46°17′S 169°47′E

Map

Inch Clutha is a large, flat island sitting in the delta between the Matau (northern) and Koau (southern) branches of the Clutha River, downstream from the town of Balclutha in the South Island of New Zealand. Approximately 10 kilometres (6 mi) long and 3 kilometres (2 mi) wide, the fertile but flood-prone land of the island is extensively farmed. The island was formed in 1878 after a massive flood changed the course of the Clutha, which had formerly reached the ocean 4 km to the south at Port Molyneux.

The island takes its name from Scots Gaelic, innis meaning "island" and Cluaidh being the Gaelic form of the name of Scotland's River Clyde.

The island is sparsely inhabited, consisting of a handful of farm houses distributed fairly evenly across the island. Only two bridges link the island to the South Island proper, both of them connecting with the Kaitangata Highway (former SH 91), one at the northern end of the island close to Stirling, and the other about one kilometre from Kaitangata. The southwestern shore of the island, along the Koau branch, includes several small oxbow lakes – in the north, close to Finegand, and also some 3 km from the Pacific coast. The northern shore contains no current oxbows, though the Matau branch travels through several large meanders (especially close to Kaitangata) which are likely to eventually become oxbows. In the largest of these, a 3500 m loop of river bends back on itself to create a neck of farmland only some 120 metres wide. At the southern end of the island, a channel links the two branches, separating Inch Clutha from a smaller broad, low-lying barrier islet sitting between it and the Pacific coast. The northern tip of Inch Clutha sits directly across the Clutha River from Balclutha Aerodrome, on the southern edge of the town. The first settlers moved there in 1848 forming a small community.
