= South Otago =

Part of New Zealand's South Island

South Otago lies in the south east of the South Island of New Zealand. As the name suggests, it forms the southernmost part of the geographical region of Otago.

The exact definition of the area designated as South Otago is imprecise, as the area is defined not in geopolitical or administrative terms, but rather by the area's topographical features and the similarity of its communities. The area is often seen as roughly congruous with the Clutha District, which has its administrative centre at Balclutha. However, most of the Taieri catchment, from Taieri Mouth and Henley to Mosgiel and Middlemarch, with the coastal areas around Brighton, has been part of the City of Dunedin since 1989. The southwestern part of Clutha District, around the townships of Tapanui and Clinton, are regarded as part of a separate area, West Otago.

== Geography ==
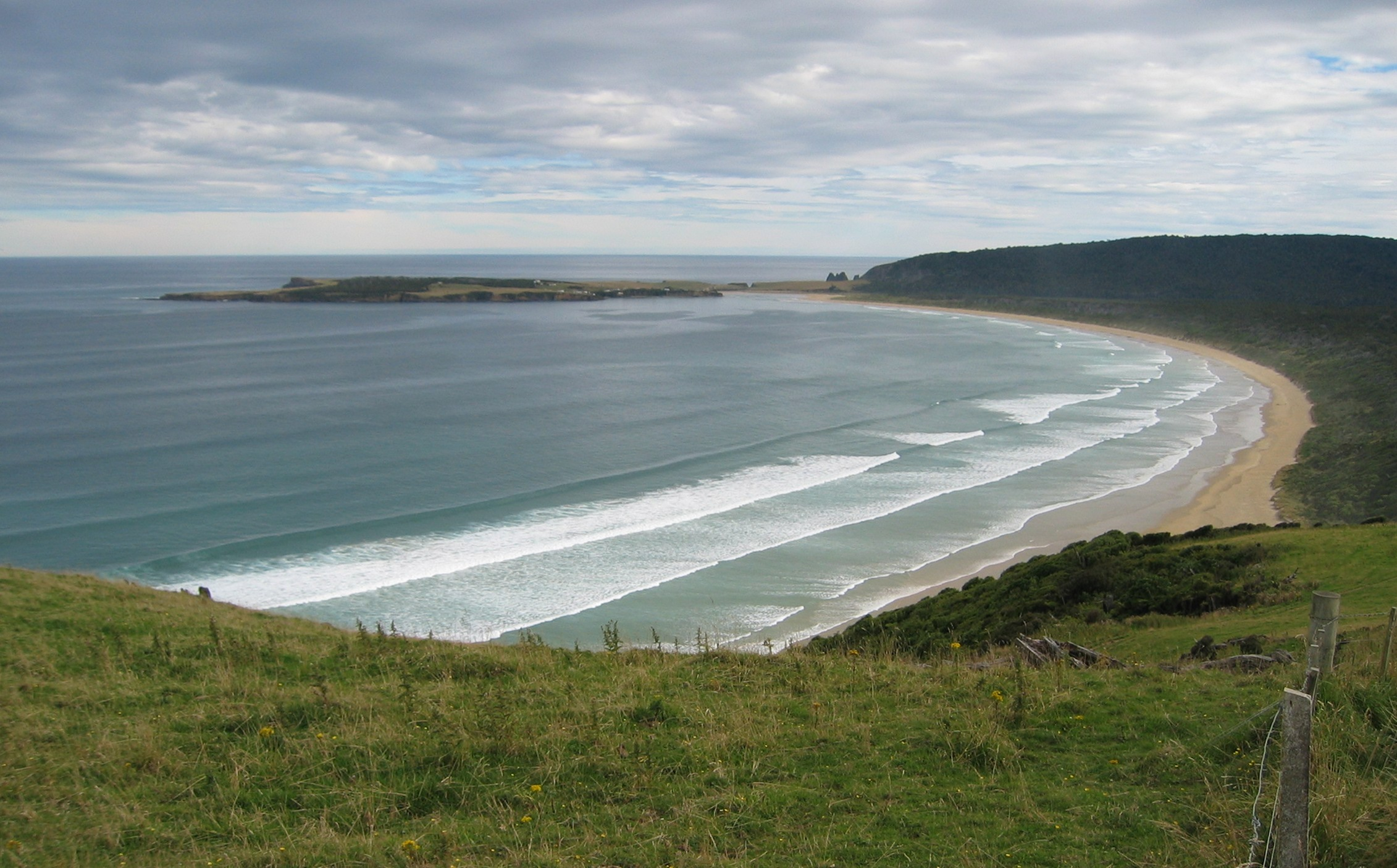
Tautuku Bay in the Catlins

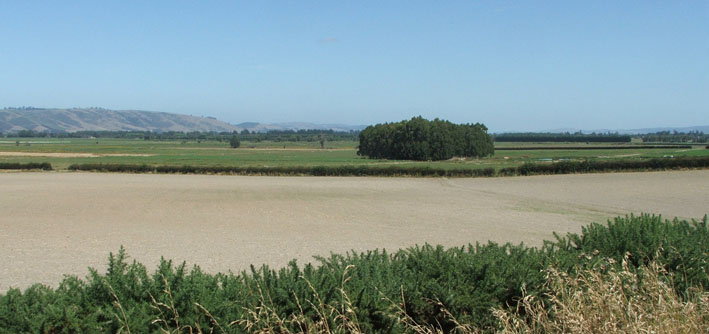
Taieri Plains

South Otago is dominated by three main topographic features: forests, hill country, and floodplains. To the south is the rough bush country of the Catlins, with its forests and rugged coastline. To the north of that the land is mainly rolling hill country, dissected by the floodplains of several large rivers. With the exception of the flat, fertile floodplains, South Otago is quite sparsely populated because of relatively cold winters, geographical isolation and lack of a decent port. A former port, Port Molyneux, located near the mouth of the Clutha River was abandoned in the early 20th century after rail transportation made freighting produce by rail to and from Dunedin more economically attractive.

There are a number of rivers flowing through South Otago, the largest being the Clutha / Matau-Au, the country's second longest river, which flows from Lake Wānaka in Central Otago for 340 kilometres, through Balclutha (Scots Gaelic for "Town on the banks of the Clyde") and there splits in two around the large delta island of Inch Clutha before reaching the Pacific Ocean. A significant west-flowing tributary is the Tuapeka River, starting point of the 1860s Otago gold rush near Lawrence.

Also of note is the Taieri, the country's fourth longest river, which winds through rough hill country before forming the Taieri Plains to the north-east of Milton then cutting through coastal hills to reach the ocean at Taieri Mouth. Lakes Waihola, Mahinerangi, and Waipori, which ultimately drain into the Taieri through its tributary the Waipori River, are also located in South Otago.

Between and roughly parallel with those two large rivers is the smaller Tokomairaro River, which drains the Milton area.

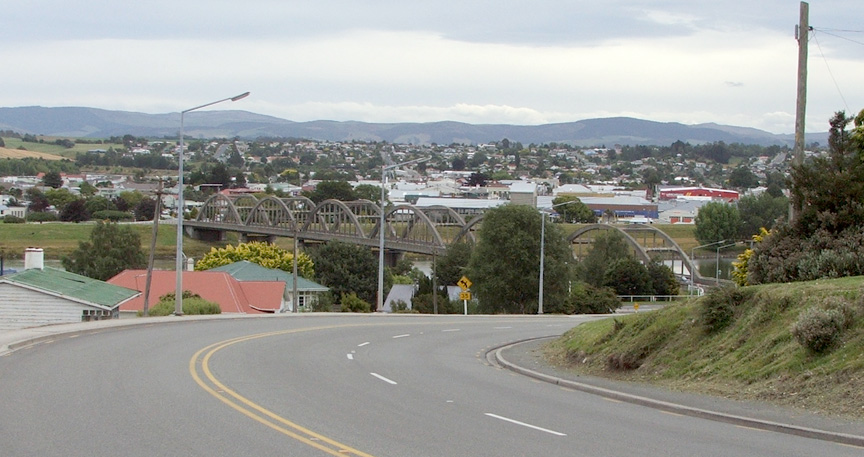
Balclutha

The most populous town is Balclutha, 81 km south of Dunedin by road (except for the occasional inclusion of the larger Mosgiel in definitions of South Otago). It serves as the main service town for the area's large farming community. Balclutha's population, by the 2006 census, was 4,062 (down from 4,137 in 1996). Other towns are Milton (pop. 1,887), Kaitangata (pop. 810), Brighton, Lawrence (pop. 432), Owaka (pop. 327), Stirling (pop. 309), Waihola, Outram, Allanton, Henley, Momona, Kaka Point (pop. 201), Taieri Mouth, and Benhar (pop. 96). For a while in the 1980s Balclutha was New Zealand's most wealthy town, per capita.

== History ==
The area has a rich history, with Māori iwi and predominantly Scottish settlers, the latter of whom arrived in the 1840s and 1850s. As happened in most of the South Island, the land was bought by these settlers from its original Māori inhabitants. Later, the main Māori tribe from the area, Kai Tahu, received a large cash settlement from the New Zealand Government as reparation for the confiscation of land that took place during that colonisation period.

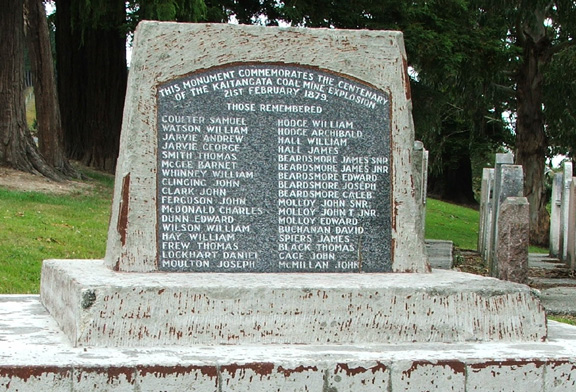
Memorial to the 1879 Kaitangata mining disaster.

The Otago gold rush of the 1860s, initially centred around Lawrence, drew thousands of men to the district in search of wealth. The discovery of coal at Kaitangata was also important for the regions development, and was also responsible for one of Otago's worst disasters, an explosion at the mine in 1879. Other minerals mined in South Otago include silica and phosphate.

In more recent times the region has been associated with woollen milling and forestry. Sheep, dairy cattle and deer are farmed locally, and farming and farm-related industries are the mainstay of the region's economy. Tourism, particularly around the Catlins, is also becoming important to the region.

South Otago's close association with Dunedin has increased since the reorganisation of local government areas in the 1980s. The northern part of South Otago, including much of the Taieri Plains, is now within the boundaries of Dunedin City (the rest of the area is almost entirely within Clutha District). The location of Dunedin International Airport at Momona is the area's most important transport hub, though most of the people who use this travel only briefly through South Otago while commuting to and from Dunedin. South Otago is also home to Lake Mahinerangi, Dunedin's most important reservoir, which is located close to the top of Maungatua.

== People ==
Residents of South Otago and Southland have a prominent accent which is noticeably different from that of the rest of New Zealand, with a rolling 'r' that is almost certainly an indication of the Gaelic roots of many of the residents. This is also indicated in the Scots Gaelic and Lallans Scots origins of many of the area's placenames. The people are paradoxically warm and friendly yet wary of strangers in their midst.

The main schools are South Otago High School in Balclutha and Tokomairiro High School in Milton.

== Notable residents ==
- Ken Bloxham (rugby player)
- Amy Bock (con artist)
- Tony Brown (rugby player)
- James Edward Fulton (surveyor and civil engineer)
- Frank Oliver (rugby player)
- Daryl Tuffey (cricketer)
- Hone Tuwhare (poet)
- John Joseph Woods (writer of the music of New Zealand's national anthem, God Defend New Zealand)
