= Clutha District Council =

Territorial authority in New Zealand

Coordinates: 46.248591°S 169.5787965°E

Type
- Type: Unicameral of Clutha District
- Houses: Governing Body
- Term limits: None

History
- Founded: 6 March 1989

Leadership
- Mayor: Jock Martin

Structure
- Seats: 15 seats (1 mayor, 14 ward seats)
- Length of term: 3 years

Website
- cluthadc.govt.nz

Clutha District Council is the territorial authority for the Clutha District of New Zealand.

The council is led by the mayor of Clutha, who is currently Jock Martin. There are also 14 ward councillors.

== Composition ==
=== Councillors ===
- Mayor Jock Martin
- Balclutha ward: 4 seats
- Bruce ward: 3 seats
- Catlins ward: 1 seat
- Clinton ward: 1 seat
- Clutha Valley ward: 1 seat
- Kaitangata-Matau ward: 1 seat
- Lawrence-Tuapeka ward: 1 seat
- West Otago ward: 2 seats

=== Community boards ===
- Lawrence/Tuapeka Community Board: 7 members
- West Otago Community Board: 8 members

== History ==
The council was established in 1989 through the merger of Lawrence Borough Council (established in 1866), Balclutha Borough Council (established in 1870), Clutha County Council (established in 1876), Tapanui Borough Council (established in 1876), and Kaitangata Borough Council (established in 1882).

In 2020, the council had 72 staff, including 11 earning more than $100,000. According to the Taxpayers' Union lobby group, residential rates averaged $2,099.
