= Mayor of Clutha =

Mayor of Clutha District
- Incumbent; Jock Martin since 2025
- Style: His Worship
- Term length: Three years, renewable
- Inaugural holder: Keith Fyall
- Formation: 1989
- Salary: $124,638
- Website: Official website

The Mayor of Clutha officiates over the Clutha District of New Zealand which is administered by the Clutha District Council.

The current mayor is Jock Martin.

== List of Mayors of Clutha ==
	Name	Portrait	Term
1	Keith Fyall		1989–1998
2	Juno Hayes		1998–2010
3	Bryan Cadogan		2010–2025
3	Jock Martin		2025–present
