= Balclutha, New Zealand =

Town in New Zealand

Balclutha Iwikatea (Māori)
- Town
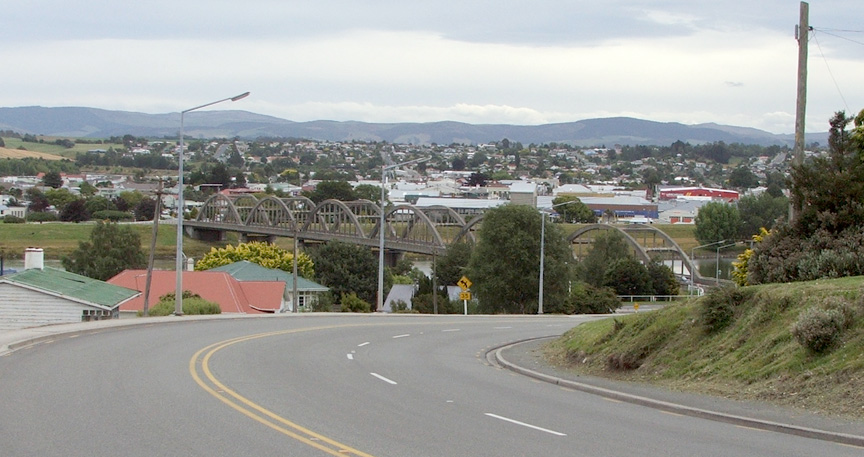
- Looking across the Clutha towards the town centre. The distinctive road bridge is visible in the centre of the picture
- Interactive map of Balclutha
- Coordinates: 46°14′S 169°45′E
- Country: New Zealand
- Region: Otago
- Territorial authority: Clutha District
- Ward: Balclutha
- Electorates: Taieri; Te Tai Tonga (Māori)

Government
  - Territorial authority: Clutha District Council
  - Regional council: Otago Regional Council
  - Mayor of Clutha: Jock Martin
  - Taieri MP: Ingrid Leary
  - Te Tai Tonga MP: Tākuta Ferris

Area
  - Total: 7.55 km^{2} (2.92 sq mi)

Population (June 2025)
  - Total: 4,460
  - Density: 591/km^{2} (1,530/sq mi)
- Time zone: UTC+12 (NZST)
  - Summer (DST): UTC+13 (NZDT)
- Postcode(s): 9230
- Area code: 03
- Local iwi: Ngāi Tahu

Balclutha (Māori: Iwikatea) is a town in South Otago, lying towards the end of the Clutha River, on the east coast of the South Island of New Zealand. It is about halfway between Dunedin and Gore on the Main South Line railway, State Highway 1 and the Southern Scenic Route. Balclutha has a population of 4,460 (as of June 2025), and is the largest town in South Otago.

The Clutha District Council is based in Balclutha.

The major service centre for the fertile farming region around the lower reaches of the Clutha River, it is also the nearest large town to the Catlins, a scenic region of native forest, wildlife, and rugged coastline.

== History ==
Known locally as "Clutha", Balclutha's name – and that of the river on which it stands – reflects the Scottish origin of the town's settlement. The name comes from Scottish Gaelic Baile Chluaidh (literally "Clyde Town", a poetic name for Dumbarton).

James McNeil from Bonhill, Dumbartonshire, Scotland, who is regarded as the town's founding father, arrived in 1853, via Port Chalmers in 1849. His farm was on the site of the present town, where he and the Provincial Government established a ferry service across the Clutha in 1857; as a result the town was initially called Clutha Ferry.

The Māori name for the area is Iwikatea, literally "Bleached bones" (a local Māori tribal battle in 1750 left the decomposing bodies of the defeated, their bones whitened in the sun).

== Demographics ==
Balclutha covers 7.55 km^{2} (2.92 sq mi) and had an estimated population of 4,460 as of June 2025, with a population density of 591 people per km^{2}.

Historical population
Year	Pop.	±% p.a.
2006	4,137	—
2013	3,987	−0.53%
2018	4,110	+0.61%

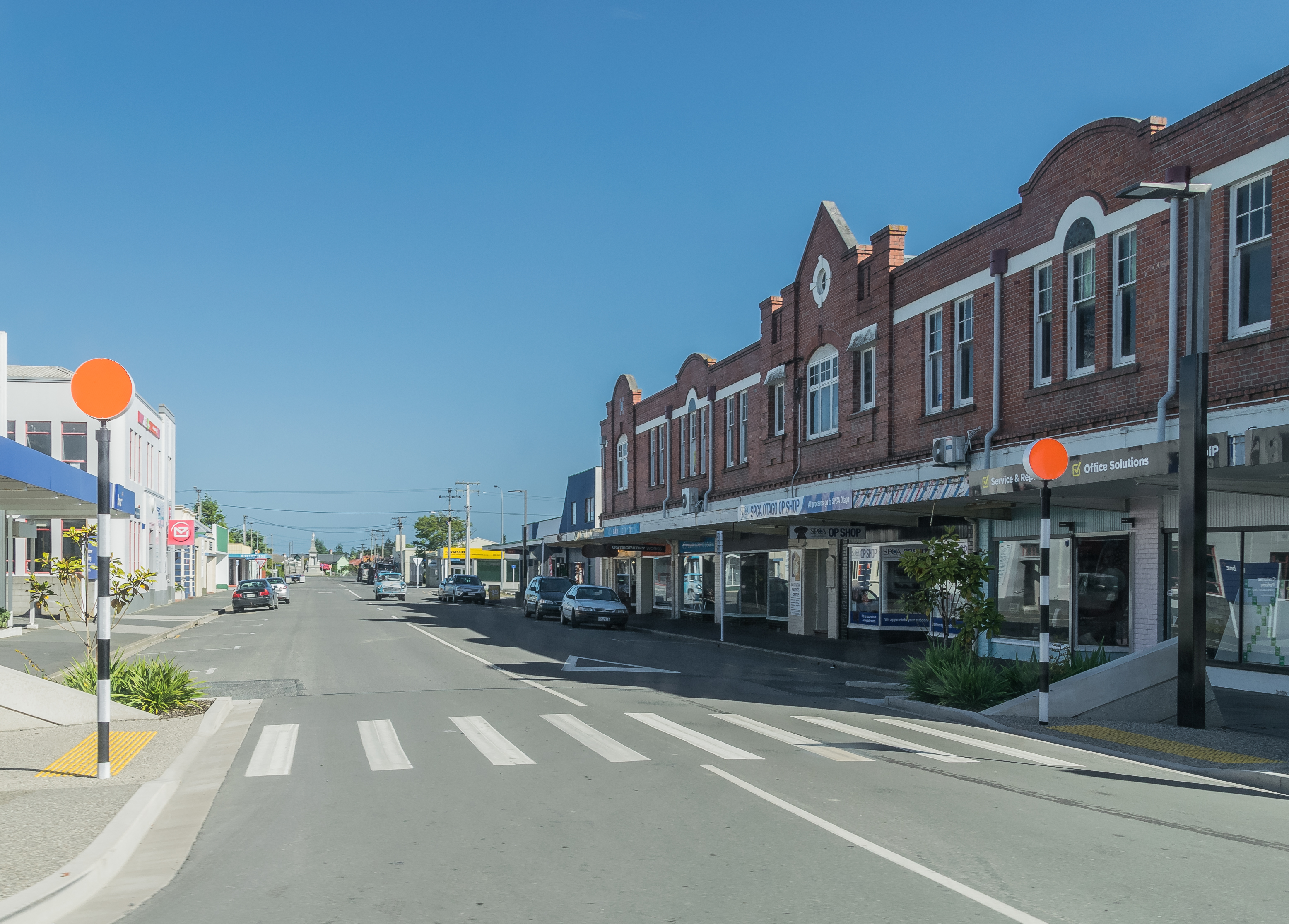
John Street

Balclutha had a population of 4,110 at the 2018 New Zealand census, an increase of 123 people (3.1%) since the 2013 census, and a decrease of 27 people (−0.7%) since the 2006 census. There were 1,725 households, comprising 2,013 males and 2,100 females, giving a sex ratio of 0.96 males per female, with 678 people (16.5%) aged under 15 years, 741 (18.0%) aged 15 to 29, 1,734 (42.2%) aged 30 to 64, and 960 (23.4%) aged 65 or older.

Ethnicities were 86.7% European/Pākehā, 11.5% Māori, 3.4% Pasifika, 5.0% Asian, and 1.3% other ethnicities. People may identify with more than one ethnicity.

The percentage of people born overseas was 12.6, compared with 27.1% nationally.

Although some people chose not to answer the census's question about religious affiliation, 52.1% had no religion, 36.3% were Christian, 0.3% had Māori religious beliefs, 0.7% were Hindu, 1.1% were Muslim, 0.6% were Buddhist and 1.3% had other religions.

Of those at least 15 years old, 339 (9.9%) people had a bachelor's or higher degree, and 1,047 (30.5%) people had no formal qualifications. 354 people (10.3%) earned over $70,000 compared to 17.2% nationally. The employment status of those at least 15 was that 1,710 (49.8%) people were employed full-time, 447 (13.0%) were part-time, and 96 (2.8%) were unemployed.

Individual statistical areas
Name	Area (km^{2})	Population	Density (per km^{2})	Households	Median age	Median income
Balclutha South	4.52	2,523	558	1,071	45.0 years	$28,400
Balclutha North	3.07	1,587	517	654	47.0 years	$29,800
New Zealand					37.4 years	$31,800

== Landmarks ==
The Clutha River flows through the town. It is the largest river in New Zealand by volume of water, and the country's second longest after the Waikato. It provides the town with various recreational facilities, including fishing (brown trout), water skiing and power boating. Immediately to the south of the town it splits into two distributaries, the Matau and the Koau, the latter of which skirts the southern edge of the town.

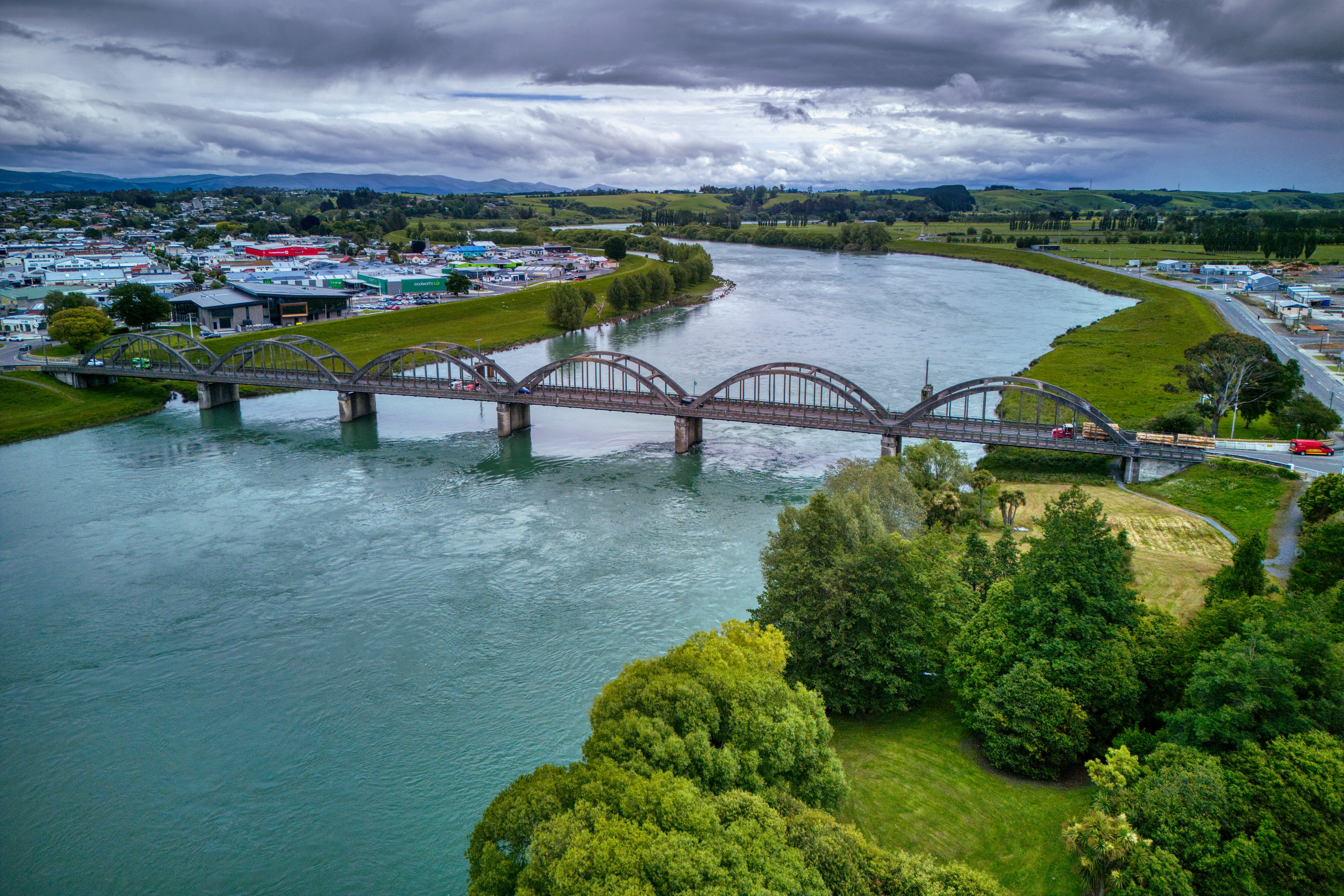
Balclutha Road Bridge

The most prominent structure in the town is the concrete Balclutha Road Bridge across the Clutha, which was built in 1935. The original 1868 wooden bridge was washed away on 14 October 1878. Rebuilt in 1881, it was later considered unsuitable for motor vehicles.

The South Island Main Trunk Railway crosses the river some 800 metres downstream, near the junction where the Clutha River divides into the southern branch, known as the Kaoru (pied shag), and the northern the Matau (derived from Mata Au, the Maori name for the Clutha).

Most of Balclutha township lies on 'the flat' land which lies within a wide loop in the river to the south of the road bridge, but North Balclutha is on the hill to the north of the bridge and Rosebank on the hill to the south.

There are several natural features in and near Balclutha. Nearby at Benhar / Kaitangata is Lake Tuakitoto, and Matai Falls, a natural waterfall and scenic feature is in the Catlins. The yellow-eyed penguin comes ashore for breeding in the Balclutha area at the edge of the Catlins, and The Nuggets are located at nearby Kaka Point.

== Education ==
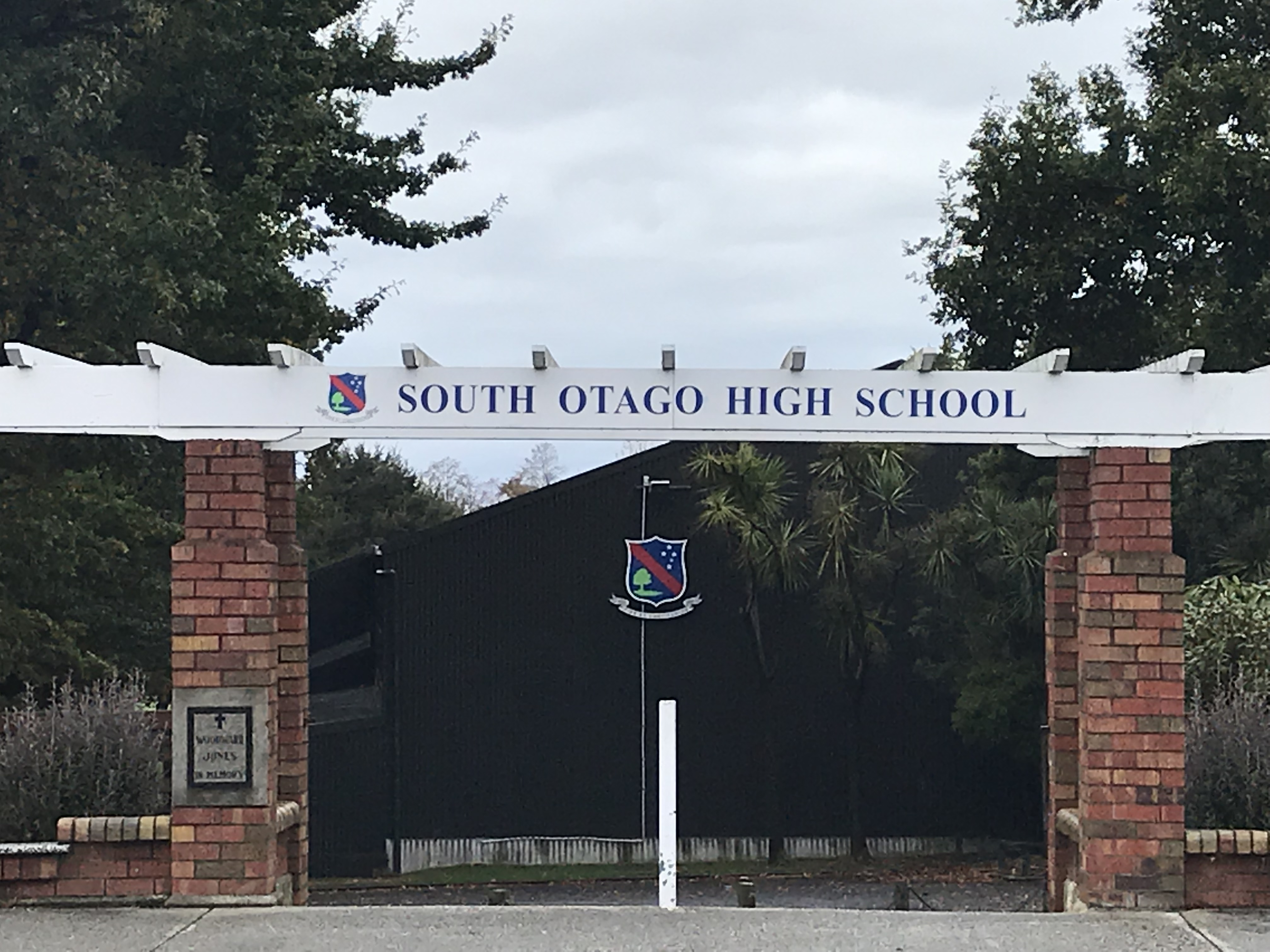
South Otago High School entrance

=== Primary schools ===
Balclutha School is a co-educational state primary school for Year 1 to 8 students, with a roll of 219 as of July 2026.

Rosebank School is a co-educational state primary school for Year 1 to 8 students, with a roll of 208.

St Joseph's School is a co-educational state primary school for Year 1 to 8 students, with a roll of 67.

Clutha Valley Primary is an educational primary school for year 1 to 8 students.

=== Secondary schools ===
South Otago High School is a co-educational state secondary school for Year 9 to 13 students, with a roll of 498.

=== Tertiary education ===
There is one tertiary education facility, Telford, a campus of the Southern Institute of Technology.

== Climate ==
Climate data for Balclutha (1991–2020)
Month	Jan	Feb	Mar	Apr	May	Jun	Jul	Aug	Sep	Oct	Nov	Dec	Year
Mean daily maximum °C (°F)	19.2 (66.6)	19.0 (66.2)	17.9 (64.2)	15.3 (59.5)	12.4 (54.3)	9.5 (49.1)	9.2 (48.6)	11.0 (51.8)	13.2 (55.8)	14.9 (58.8)	16.2 (61.2)	18.2 (64.8)	14.7 (58.4)
Daily mean °C (°F)	14.2 (57.6)	14.0 (57.2)	12.5 (54.5)	10.2 (50.4)	7.8 (46.0)	5.3 (41.5)	4.7 (40.5)	6.2 (43.2)	8.2 (46.8)	10.0 (50.0)	11.4 (52.5)	13.2 (55.8)	9.8 (49.7)
Mean daily minimum °C (°F)	9.2 (48.6)	8.9 (48.0)	7.1 (44.8)	5.2 (41.4)	3.1 (37.6)	1.2 (34.2)	0.2 (32.4)	1.4 (34.5)	3.2 (37.8)	5.1 (41.2)	6.5 (43.7)	8.3 (46.9)	5.0 (40.9)
Average rainfall mm (inches)	69.0 (2.72)	62.5 (2.46)	40.3 (1.59)	59.9 (2.36)	74.9 (2.95)	53.4 (2.10)	60.7 (2.39)	32.2 (1.27)	45.2 (1.78)	62.1 (2.44)	52.9 (2.08)	45.4 (1.79)	658.5 (25.93)
Mean monthly sunshine hours	213.9	186.3	168.3	130.3	116.1	109.7	112.0	143.1	171.3	199.2	200.8	214.4	1,965.4
Source: NIWA

== Notable people ==
- Alister Abernethy, politician
- Ronald Algie, politician, educated in Balclutha
- John Barr, poet
- Aubrey Begg, politician
- Tony Brown, All Black rugby union player
- Morgan Endicott-Davies, judoka
- Tony Ensor, rugby union player international sevens player
- Matt Faddes, rugby union player and international sevens player
- Phillipa Finch, netball player
- Aaron Gale, international cricketer
- Paul Grant, rugby union player and international rugby sevens player
- Hone Kouka, playwright
- Robbie Johnston, Olympic long-distance runner
- Ian Murray Mackerras, zoologist
- Clive Matthewson, politician
- Jan Mortimer, international draughts player
- Rachel Pullar, women's international cricketer
- Barbara Tilden, international hockey player
- Sarah Tsukigawa, women's international cricketer
- Rob Webster, virologist
- Debbie White, international netball player
- Charles Willocks, rugby union player and All Black
- Jared Wrennall, band member for Steriogram
- Edward (Ted) Bullmore, surrealist artist
- Kazuyuki Kiyohei Tsukigawa, early Japanese New Zealand mariner

== Notes ==
- Bette Flagler. 2005. Adventure guide: New Zealand, Hunter Publishing, Inc, 800 pages ISBN 1-58843-405-2
- Reed, A.W. (2002) The Reed dictionary of New Zealand place names. Auckland: Reed Books. ISBN 0-790-00761-4.
