= The Catlins =

Coastal region of the South Island of New Zealand

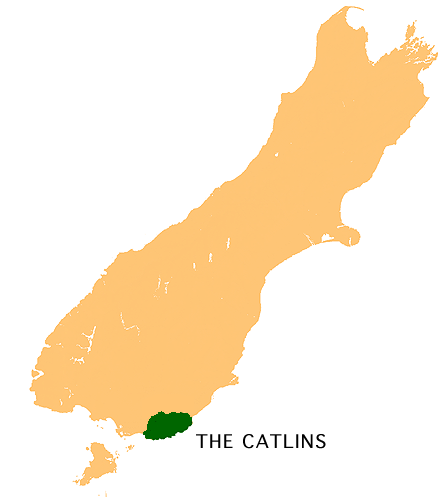
The Catlins
Location of the Catlins in New Zealand's South Island
Location
Country:	New Zealand
Island:	South Island
Statistics
Population:	3,780 (June 2025)
Area:	2,454.81 km^{2} (950 sq mi)
Location
Coordinates:	46°30′S 169°30′E
Administration
Regions:	Otago and Southland
Districts:	Clutha District and Southland District
Main towns and settlements:	Owaka, Papatowai, Waikawa, Tokanui, Kaka Point, Fortrose
Parliamentary electorate:	Clutha-Southland

The Catlins (sometimes referred to as The Catlins Coast) comprise an area in the southeastern corner of the South Island of New Zealand. The area lies between Balclutha and Invercargill, straddling the boundary between the Otago and Southland regions. It includes the South Island's southernmost point, Slope Point.

A rugged, sparsely populated area, the Catlins features a scenic coastal landscape and dense temperate rainforest, both of which harbour many endangered species of birds, most notably the rare yellow-eyed penguin. The coast attracts numerous marine mammals, among them New Zealand fur seals and Hooker's sea lions. In general terms the area enjoys a maritime temperate climate. Its exposed location leads to its frequently wild weather and heavy ocean swells, which are an attraction to big-wave surfers, and have also caused numerous shipwrecks.

People have lived in the area since around 1350 AD. Prior to European settlement, the region was sparsely inhabited by nomadic groups of Māori, most of whom lived close to river mouths. In the early days of European settlement the area was frequented by whalers and sealers, and saw milling became a major local industry from the mid-19th century until the 1930s.

Tourism has become of growing importance in the Catlins economy, which otherwise relies heavily on dairy farming and fishing.

The region's population has fallen to less than half its peak in the early 20th century. Some 1,200 people now live in the Catlins, many of them in the settlement of Owaka. This is linked to population centres to the north and southwest via the area's only major road, part of the Southern Scenic Route. Owaka contains the area's main school, the Catlins Area School, catering for students from year 1 to year 13. There are three other small primary schools throughout the Catlins district. Owaka also has a medical centre, the nearest hospital being in Balclutha. The Catlins is governed at local level as part of the Clutha and Southland Districts and is represented at national level as part of the Southland electorate.

== Geography ==
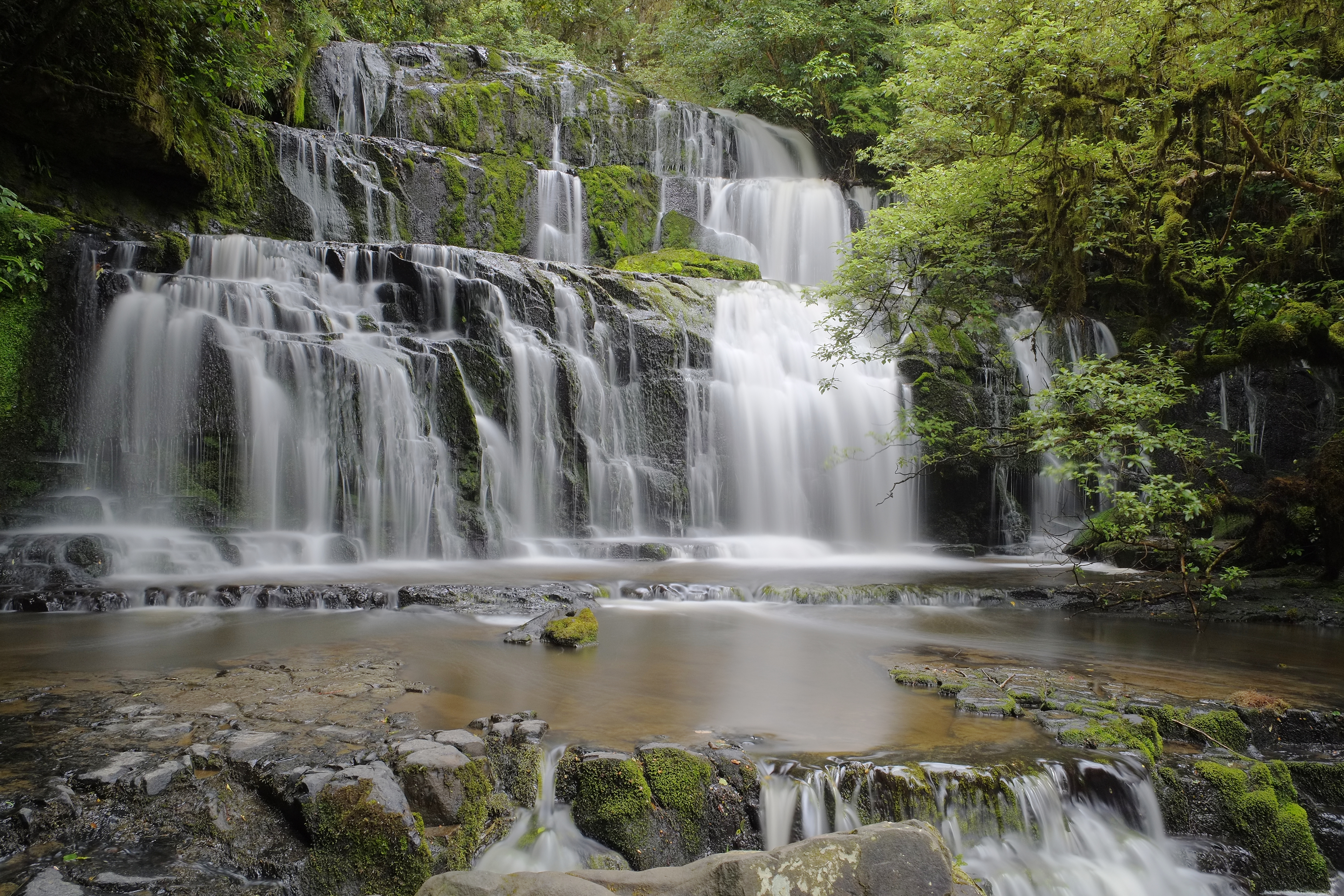
Purakaunui Falls, 17 km (11 mi) southwest of Owaka

The Catlins area covers some 1,900 km^{2} (730 sq mi) and forms a rough triangular shape, extending up to 40 km (25 mi) inland and along a stretch of coast 100 km (60 mi) in extent between the mouths of two large rivers, the Clutha River in the northeast and the Mataura River in the west.

The rugged, scenic coastline of the Catlins features sandy beaches, blowholes, a petrified forest at Curio Bay, and the Cathedral Caves, which visitors can reach at low tide. Much of the coastline consists of high cliffs, up to 200 m (660 ft) in height, and the land rises sharply from the coast at most points. For this reason, many of the area's rivers cascade over waterfalls as they approach the ocean (notably the iconic Purakaunui Falls on the short Purakaunui River).

The South Island's southernmost point, Slope Point, projects near the southwestern corner of the Catlins. To the west of this lies Waipapa Point, often considered the boundary of the Catlins region, beyond which lies the swampy land around the mouth of the Mataura River at the eastern end of Toetoes Bay. But various people place the western boundary of the Catlins region in different places, and some more stringent definitions exclude even Slope Point. A proposed boundary circulated in 2009 by the New Zealand Geographic Board ran roughly north from Slope Point, then inland around the Catlins Ranges and east to Nugget Point. Tourist organisations objected, asking that the boundary be moved further west to include Fortrose.

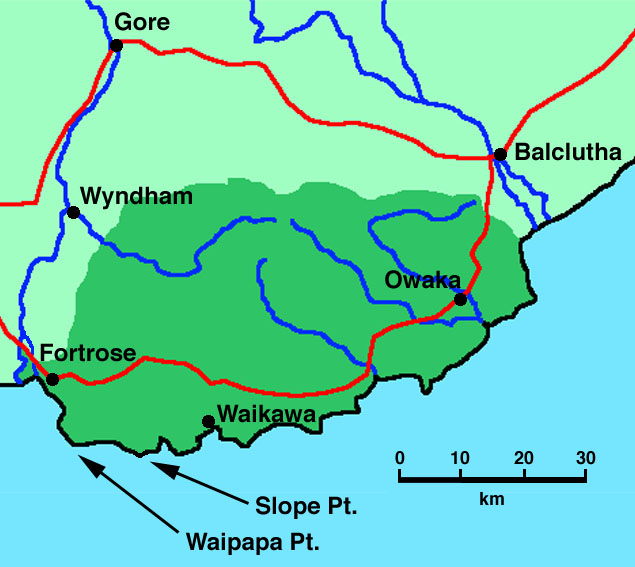
Map of the Catlins

Several parallel ranges of hills dominate the interior of the Catlins, separated by the valleys of the Ōwaka, Catlins and Tahakopa Rivers, which all drain southeastwards into the Pacific Ocean. The most notable of these ranges is the Maclennan Range. Between them, these hills are often simply referred to as the Catlins Ranges. Their northwestern slopes are drained by several tributaries of the Clutha and Mataura Rivers, most notably the Mokoreta River, which flows mainly westwards, reaching the Mataura close to the town of Wyndham.

The highest point in the Catlins, Mount Pye (720 m or 2,360 ft) stands 25 km (16 mi) north-northeast of Waikawa and close to the source of the Mokoreta River, and marks part of the Otago-Southland border. Other prominent peaks above 600 m (2,000 ft) include Mount Rosebery, Catlins Cone, Mount Tautuku, and Ajax Hill. The Catlins has several small lakes, notably scenic Lake Wilkie close to the Tautuku Peninsula. Catlins Lake, near Owaka, actually consists of the tidal estuary of the Catlins River.

Shipping has found the Catlins coast notoriously dangerous, and many shipwrecks have occurred on the headlands that jut into the Pacific Ocean here. Two lighthouses stand at opposite ends of the Catlins to help prevent further mishaps. The Nugget Point Lighthouse stands 76 m (249 ft) above the water at the end of Nugget Point, casting its light across a series of eroded stacks (the "nuggets" which give the point its name). It was built in 1869–70. The Waipapa Point light, which stands only 21 m (69 ft) above sea level, was the last wooden lighthouse to be built in New Zealand, and was constructed in 1884 in response to the tragic 1881 wreck of the Tararua. Both of these lighthouses are now fully automated.

O then, drama abounds for sure,
and the window to the sea-ward
side of my crib begins rattle-screeching
an order for me to 'Come out! Come out, Sloth!
And witness this!'
'Uh huh', I say.

— Hone Tuwhare, Here's looking at You, Sea

Due to its position at the southern tip of New Zealand, the Catlins coastline lies exposed to some of the country's largest ocean swells, often over 5 m (16 ft). The region has enjoyed a growing reputation for big wave surfing, with regular competitions, award-winning rides, and coverage on the Discovery Channel gathering publicity for the sport. The Department of Conservation proposed protecting the Papatowai surf break in 2008, citing its national significance for surfing.

The landscape of the Catlins features in many poems by celebrated poet Hone Tuwhare. Born in Northland, Tuwhare lived in Kaka Point from 1992 until his death in 2008, and became one of the area's best-known inhabitants. His family plan to establish a writers' retreat at his crib there. The film Two Little Boys, starring comedians Bret McKenzie and Hamish Blake, was filmed in the Catlins early in 2011.

== Climate ==
The Catlins has a cool maritime temperate climate, somewhat cooler than other parts of the South Island, and strongly modified by the effect of the Pacific Ocean. Winds can reach considerable strength, especially on the exposed coast; most of the South Island's storms develop to the south or southwest of the island, and thus the Catlins catches the brunt of many of these weather patterns.

The Catlins—and especially its central and southern areas—experiences considerably higher precipitation than most of the South Island's east coast; heavy rain occurs infrequently, but drizzle is common and the region averages around 150 days of rain per year. Rain days are spread fairly evenly throughout the year; there is no particularly rainy season in the northern Catlins, and only a slight tendency towards more autumn rain in the southwest. The average annual rainfall recorded at the Tautuku Outdoor Education Centre is about 1,300 mm (51 in), with little variation from year to year.

Fine days can be sunny and warm, and daily maxima may exceed 30 °C (86 °F) in mid-summer (January/February). A more usual daily maximum in summer would be 18–20 °C (64–68 °F). Snow is rare except on the peaks even in the coldest part of winter, though frost is quite common during the months of June to September. Typical daily maximum temperatures in winter are 10–13 °C (50–55 °F).

== History ==
The first people known to live in the Catlins, Māori of the Kāti Māmoe, Waitaha, and Kāi Tahu iwi (tribes), merged via marriage and conquest into the iwi now known as Kāi Tahu. Archaeological evidence of human presence dates back to approximately 1350 AD. The area's inhabitants were semi-nomadic, travelling from Stewart Island in the south and inland to Central Otago. They generally dwelt near river mouths for easy access to the best food resources. In legend, the Catlins forests further inland were inhabited by Maeroero (wild giants).

The Catlins may have offered one of the last places where the giant flightless bird, the moa, could be hunted, and the timber of the forest proved ideal for canoe construction (the name of the settlement Owaka means "Place of the canoe"). No formal Māori pā (villages) were located in the Catlins, but there were many hunting camps, notably at Papatowai, near the mouth of the Tahakopa River.

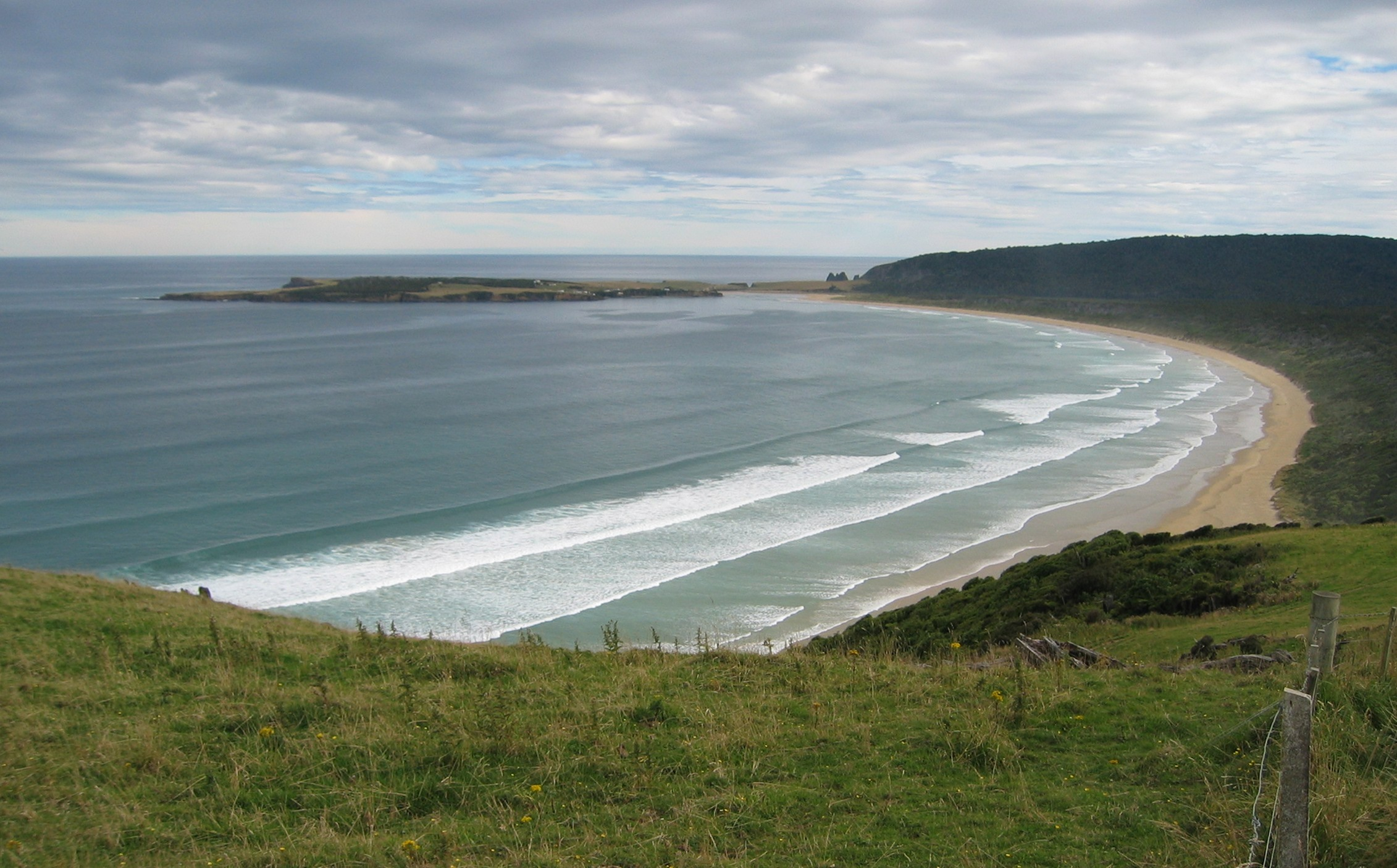
The distant Tautuku Peninsula hosted an early whaling station.

Europeans first sighted the area in 1770 when the crew of James Cook's Endeavour sailed along the coast. Cook named a bay in the Catlins area Molineux's Harbour after his ship's master Robert Molineux. Although this was almost certainly the mouth of the Waikawa River, later visitors applied the name to a bay to the northeast, close to the mouth of the Clutha River, which itself was for many years known as the Molyneux River. The town of Port Molyneux, located on this bay, was a busy harbour during the 19th century. Its location at the mouth of the Clutha made it a good site for trade both from the interior and for coastal and ocean-going shipping. A major flood in 1878 shifted the mouth of the Clutha to the north and silted up the port, after which the town gradually dwindled.

Sealers and whalers founded the first European settlements in the early years of the 19th century, at which time the hunting of marine mammals dominated European economic activity in New Zealand. A whaling station was established on the Tautuku Peninsula in 1839, with smaller stations at Waikawa and close to the mouth of the Clutha River.

The Catlins take their name from the Catlins River, itself named for whaling captain Edward Cattlin (sometimes spelt Catlin). He purchased an extensive block of land along Catlins River on 15 February 1840 from Kāi Tahu chief Hone Tūhawaiki (also known as "Bloody Jack") for muskets and £30 (roughly NZ$3000 in 2005 dollars). New Zealand's land commissioners declined to endorse the purchase, however, and the Māori received much of the land back after long negotiations ending more than a decade after Cattlin's death.

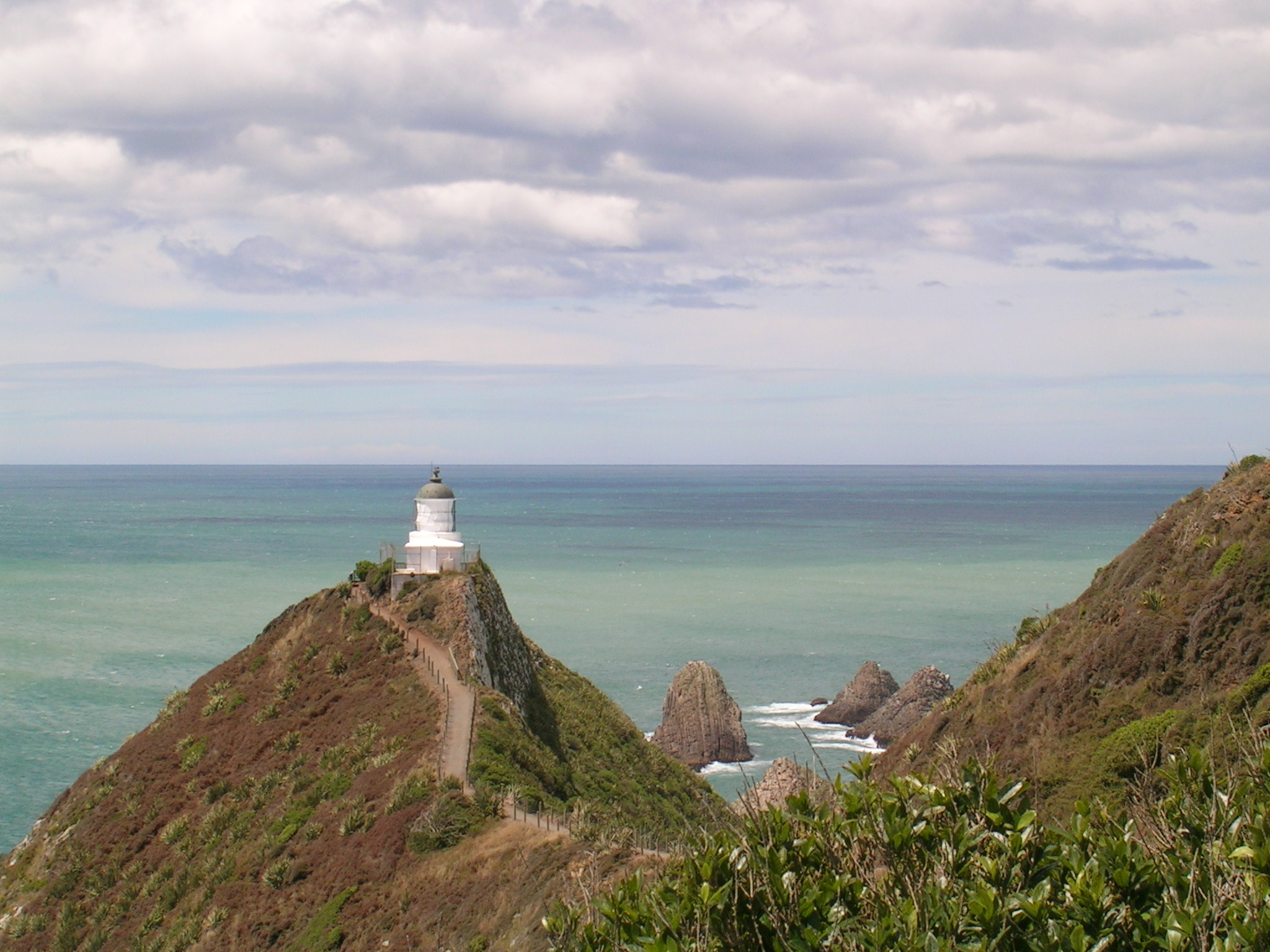
The Nugget Point Lighthouse has guided ships since 1870.

During the mid-19th century the area developed into a major saw-milling region, supplying the newly developing town of Dunedin with timber shipped from the ports of Waikawa and Fortrose. A 70 m-long (230 ft) jetty was built at Fortrose in 1875, although this has long since disappeared. Several shipwrecks occurred along the treacherous coastline during this period. Most notably, one of New Zealand's worst shipping disasters occurred here: the wreck of the passenger-steamer Tararua, en route from Bluff to Port Chalmers, which foundered off Waipapa Point on 29 April 1881 with the loss of all but 20 of the 151 people aboard.

Another noted shipwreck, that of the Surat, occurred on New Year's Day in 1874. This ship, holed on rocks near Chasland's Mistake eight kilometres southeast of Tautuku Peninsula, limped as far as the mouth of the Catlins River before its 271 immigrants abandoned ship. A beach at the mouth of the Catlins River is named Surat Bay in commemoration of this wreck. The schooner Wallace and steamer Otago were also both wrecked at or near Chasland's Mistake, in 1866 and 1876 respectively, and a 4534-ton steamer, the Manuka, ran aground at Long Point north of Tautuku in 1929. In all there were eight shipwrecks of note between 1839 and 1892.

After a decline in the 1890s, the logging of native timber expanded into new areas made accessible by an extension of the railway, before petering out in the mid-20th century. A series of bushfires destroyed several mills in 1935. The cleared land was used primarily for pastoral sheep and dairy farming, which continues to be a mainstay of the Catlins' economy. Much of the remaining forest is now protected by the Department of Conservation as part of the Catlins Conservation Park.

Medical pioneer Dr Truby King established a farm at Tahakopa and a Catlins timber mill from the 1890s to the 1920s, and gave some of his mental patients vocational training there.

From the time of the Great Depression until the formation of the New Zealand Rabbit Board in 1954, rabbits became a major pest in the area, and rabbiters were employed to keep the creatures under control. The trapping of rabbits and auctioning of their skins in Dunedin became a minor but important part of the Catlins area's economy during this time.

The area's population has declined from a peak of around 2,700 in 1926 to its current level of around 1,200. This decline has halted in recent decades, with 2008 figures being very similar to those of 1986.

== Natural history ==
=== Wildlife ===
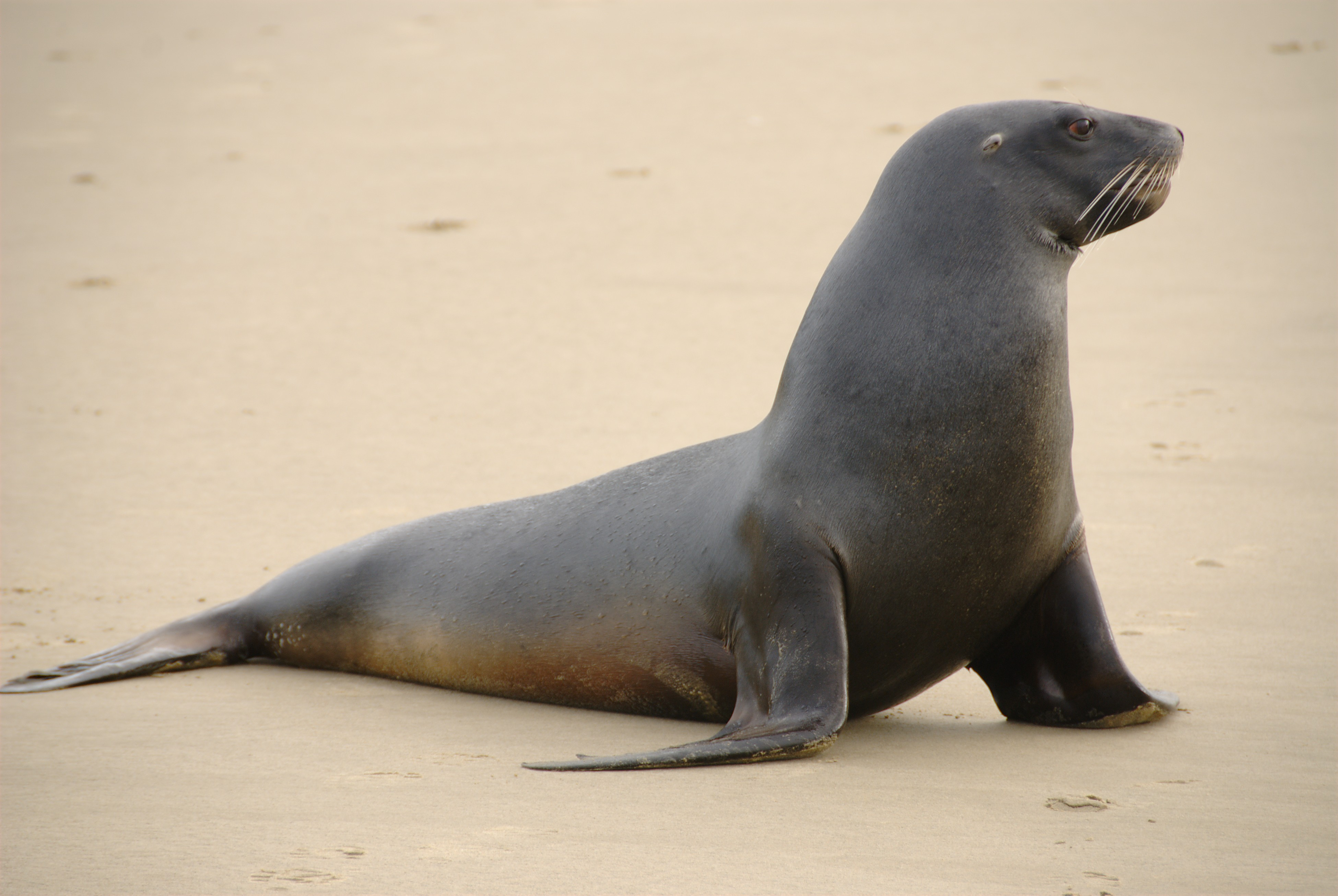
Hooker's sea lions frequent the Catlins coast.

The Catlins coast often hosts New Zealand fur seals and Hooker's sea lions, and occasionally southern elephant seals can be seen. Several species of penguin also nest along the coast, notably the rare yellow-eyed penguin (hoiho), as do other seabirds including mollymawks and Australasian gannets, and the estuaries of the rivers are home to herons, stilts, godwits and oystercatchers. Bitterns and the threatened fernbird (mātātā) can also occasionally be seen along the reedy riverbanks.

In the forests, endangered birds such as the mōhua and kākāriki occur, as do other birds such as the tūī, pīwakawaka, and kererū. One of New Zealand's only two native species of non-marine mammal, the long-tailed bat, lives in small numbers within the forests, and several species of lizard are also found locally, including the southern forest gecko.

Many species of fish, shellfish, and crustaceans frequent both the local rivers and sea, notably crayfish and pāua. Nugget Point in the northern Catlins hosts a particularly rich variety of marine wildlife. The establishment of a marine reserve off the coast here, discussed in 1992, 2004 and 2015, has been controversial. Hector's dolphins can often be seen close to the Catlins coast, especially at Porpoise Bay near Waikawa, which is protected as part of the Catlins Coast Marine Mammal Sanctuary, established in 2008. Migratory southern right whales and humpback whales can be spotted along the coastline during winter.

=== Flora ===
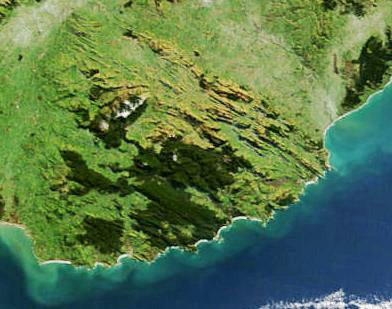
Forested areas show dark green in this satellite picture of the Catlins. The area's parallel strike ridges – part of the Southland Syncline – can clearly be seen running from north-west to south-east in the northern part of this image.

The Catlins features dense temperate rainforest, dominated by podocarps. This is the largest area of native forest remaining on the South Island's east coast, with over 500 square kilometres (190 sq mi) of forest and neighbouring subalpine areas being protected in Catlins Conservation Park. The forest is thick with trees such as rimu (Dacrydium cupressinum), tōtara (Podocarpus totara), southern beech (Nothofagus), mataī (Prumnopitys taxifolia) and kahikatea (Dacrycarpus dacrydioides). Of particular note are the virgin rimu and tōtara forest remaining in those areas which were too rugged or steep to have been milled by early settlers, and an extensive area of silver beech forest close to the Takahopa River. This is New Zealand's most southerly expanse of beech forest. Many native species of forest plant can be found in the undergrowth of the Catlins forest, including young lancewoods, orchids such as the spider orchid and perching Easter orchid, and many different native ferns.

Settlers cleared much of the Catlins' coastal vegetation for farmland, but in some areas the original coastal plant life survives, primarily around cliff edges and some of the bays close to the Tautuku Peninsula, these being furthest from the landward edges of the forest. Plant life here includes many native species adapted to the strong salt-laden winds found in this exposed region. The Catlins coastal daisy (Celmisia lindsayii) is unique to the region, and is related to New Zealand's mountain daisies. Tussocks, hebes, and flaxes are common, as are native gentians, though the endangered native sedge pingao can now rarely be found. In years when the southern rātā flowers well, the coastal forest canopy turns bright red. The rātā also thrives in some inland areas.

=== Geology ===
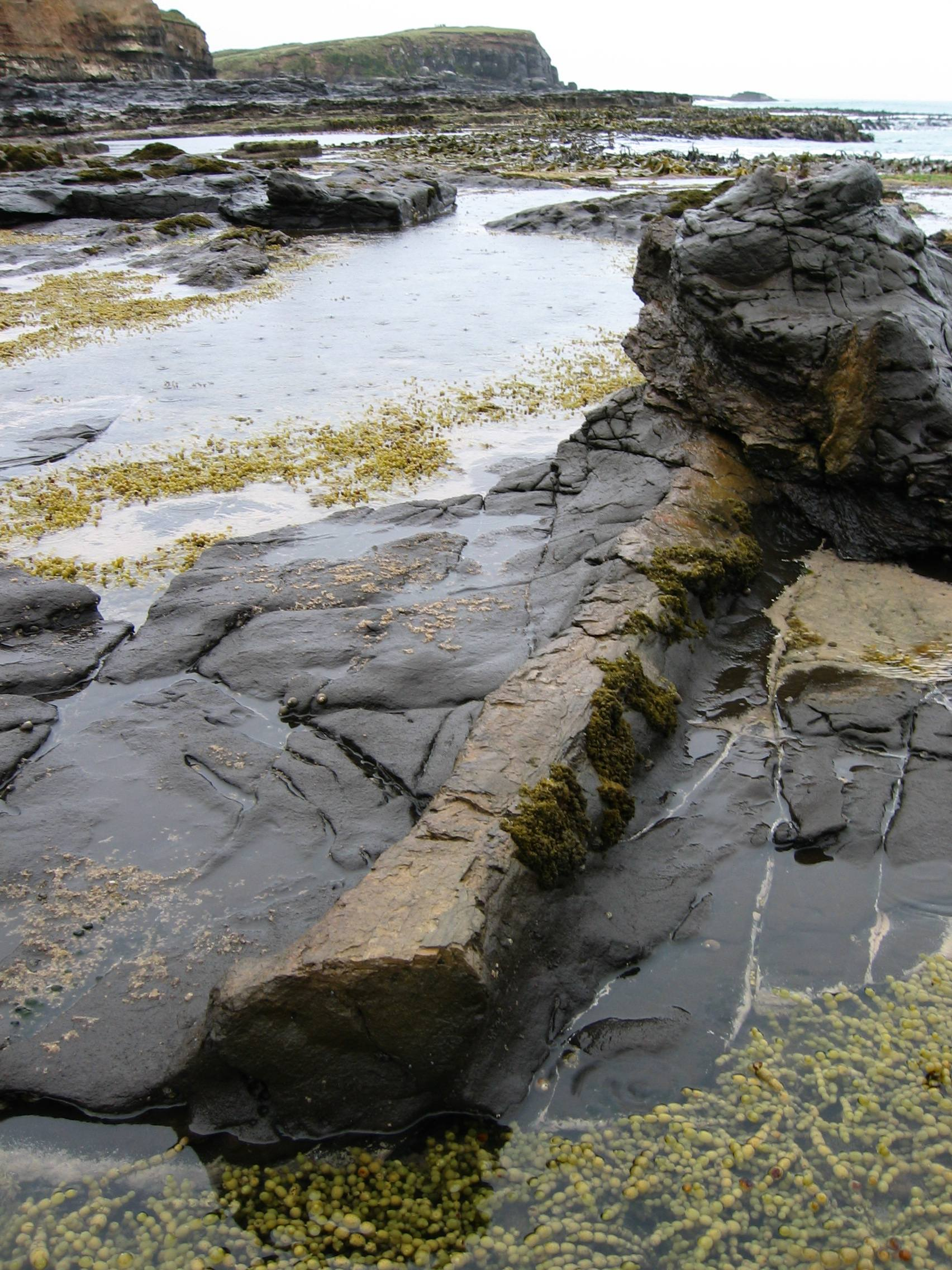
A petrified log at Curio Bay

The geology of the Catlins dates back to over 150 million years ago, when the bedrock of the New Zealand continent was being assembled by thick sediments and volcanic arcs accreting onto the edge of the Gondwana supercontinent in a series of long thin terranes. The parallel hill ranges of the Catlins form part of the Murihiku terrane, which extends inland through the Hokonui Hills as far west as Mossburn. This itself forms part of a larger system known as the Southland Syncline, a fold system which links to similar formations in Tasman District (offset by the Alpine Fault), the North Island and even New Caledonia, 3,500 km (2,200 mi) away.

The north-eastern boundary of this geologic region is marked by the Murihiku escarpment, which runs along the southern edge of the dormant Hillfoot fault line. The Catlins ranges are strike ridges composed of Triassic and Jurassic sandstones, mudstones and other related sedimentary rocks, often with a high incidence of feldspar. Fossils of the late and middle Triassic Warepan and Kaihikuan stages are found in the area.

Curio Bay features the petrified remains of a forest 160 million years old. This represents a remnant of the subtropical woodland that once covered the region, only to become submerged by the sea. The fossilised remnants of trees closely related to modern kauri and Norfolk pine can be seen here.

== Population and demographics ==
The Catlins are partly in the Otago region and partly in Southland, and consequently are covered in two statistical areas. They cover 2,454.81 km^{2} (947.81 sq mi) and had an estimated population of 3,780 as of June 2025, with a population density of 1.5 people per km^{2}.

Almost all of the Catlins' population lies either close to the route of the former state highway running from Balclutha to Invercargill (which now forms part of the Southern Scenic Route), or in numerous tiny coastal settlements, most of which have only a few dozen inhabitants.

The largest town in the Catlins, Owaka, had a population of 309 in the 2018 census. It is located 35 km (22 mi) southwest of Balclutha. The only other settlements of any great size are Kaka Point (population 231), Waikawa, Tokanui, and Fortrose, which lies at the western edge of the Catlins on the estuary of the Mataura River. Most of the area's other settlements are either little more than farming communities (such as Romahapa, Maclennan, and Glenomaru) or seasonally populated holiday communities with few permanent residents (such as Papatowai or Pounawea).

=== Catlins statistical area ===
The Catlins statistical area, which includes the Catlins within the Otago region, covers 1,072.98 km^{2} (414.28 sq mi) and had an estimated population of 1,460 as of June 2025, with a population density of 1.4 people per km^{2}.

Historical population of the Catlins statistical area
Year	Pop.	±% p.a.
2006	1,332	—
2013	1,254	−0.86%
2018	1,305	+0.80%

Catlins had a population of 1,305 at the 2018 New Zealand census, an increase of 51 people (4.1%) since the 2013 census, and a decrease of 27 people (−2.0%) since the 2006 census. There were 579 households, comprising 681 males and 624 females, giving a sex ratio of 1.09 males per female. The median age was 50.1 years (compared with 37.4 years nationally), with 213 people (16.3%) aged under 15 years, 147 (11.3%) aged 15 to 29, 675 (51.7%) aged 30 to 64, and 270 (20.7%) aged 65 or older.

Ethnicities were 94.9% European/Pākehā, 8.7% Māori, 0.7% Pasifika, 1.1% Asian, and 1.4% other ethnicities. People may identify with more than one ethnicity.

The percentage of people born overseas was 10.6, compared with 27.1% nationally.

Although some people chose not to answer the census's question about religious affiliation, 57.0% had no religion, 31.5% were Christian, 0.2% had Māori religious beliefs, 0.5% were Buddhist and 1.6% had other religions.

Of those at least 15 years old, 144 (13.2%) people had a bachelor's or higher degree, and 291 (26.6%) people had no formal qualifications. The median income was $30,000, compared with $31,800 nationally. 129 people (11.8%) earned over $70,000 compared to 17.2% nationally. The employment status of those at least 15 was that 579 (53.0%) people were employed full-time, 186 (17.0%) were part-time, and 21 (1.9%) were unemployed.

=== Wyndham-Catlins statistical area ===
Wyndham-Catlins, which includes the Catlins within the Southland region, covers 1,381.83 km^{2} (533.53 sq mi) and had an estimated population of 2,320 as of June 2025, with a population density of 1.7 people per km^{2}. Many of the people in this statistical area live outside the Catlins, with over a quarter of them living in the town of Wyndham.

Historical population for Wyndham-Catlins statistical area
Year	Pop.	±% p.a.
2006	2,130	—
2013	2,178	+0.32%
2018	2,196	+0.16%

Wyndham-Catlins had a population of 2,196 at the 2018 New Zealand census, an increase of 18 people (0.8%) since the 2013 census, and an increase of 66 people (3.1%) since the 2006 census. There were 834 households, comprising 1,164 males and 1,032 females, giving a sex ratio of 1.13 males per female. The median age was 41.0 years (compared with 37.4 years nationally), with 462 people (21.0%) aged under 15 years, 375 (17.1%) aged 15 to 29, 1,044 (47.5%) aged 30 to 64, and 315 (14.3%) aged 65 or older.

Ethnicities were 92.5% European/Pākehā, 12.2% Māori, 1.6% Pasifika, 1.9% Asian, and 1.2% other ethnicities. People may identify with more than one ethnicity.

The percentage of people born overseas was 7.0, compared with 27.1% nationally.

Although some people chose not to answer the census's question about religious affiliation, 53.4% had no religion, 36.5% were Christian, 0.3% had Māori religious beliefs, 0.3% were Hindu, 0.1% were Muslim, 0.4% were Buddhist and 1.4% had other religions.

Of those at least 15 years old, 192 (11.1%) people had a bachelor's or higher degree, and 477 (27.5%) people had no formal qualifications. The median income was $33,400, compared with $31,800 nationally. 225 people (13.0%) earned over $70,000 compared to 17.2% nationally. The employment status of those at least 15 was that 1,008 (58.1%) people were employed full-time, 306 (17.6%) were part-time, and 30 (1.7%) were unemployed.

== Economy ==
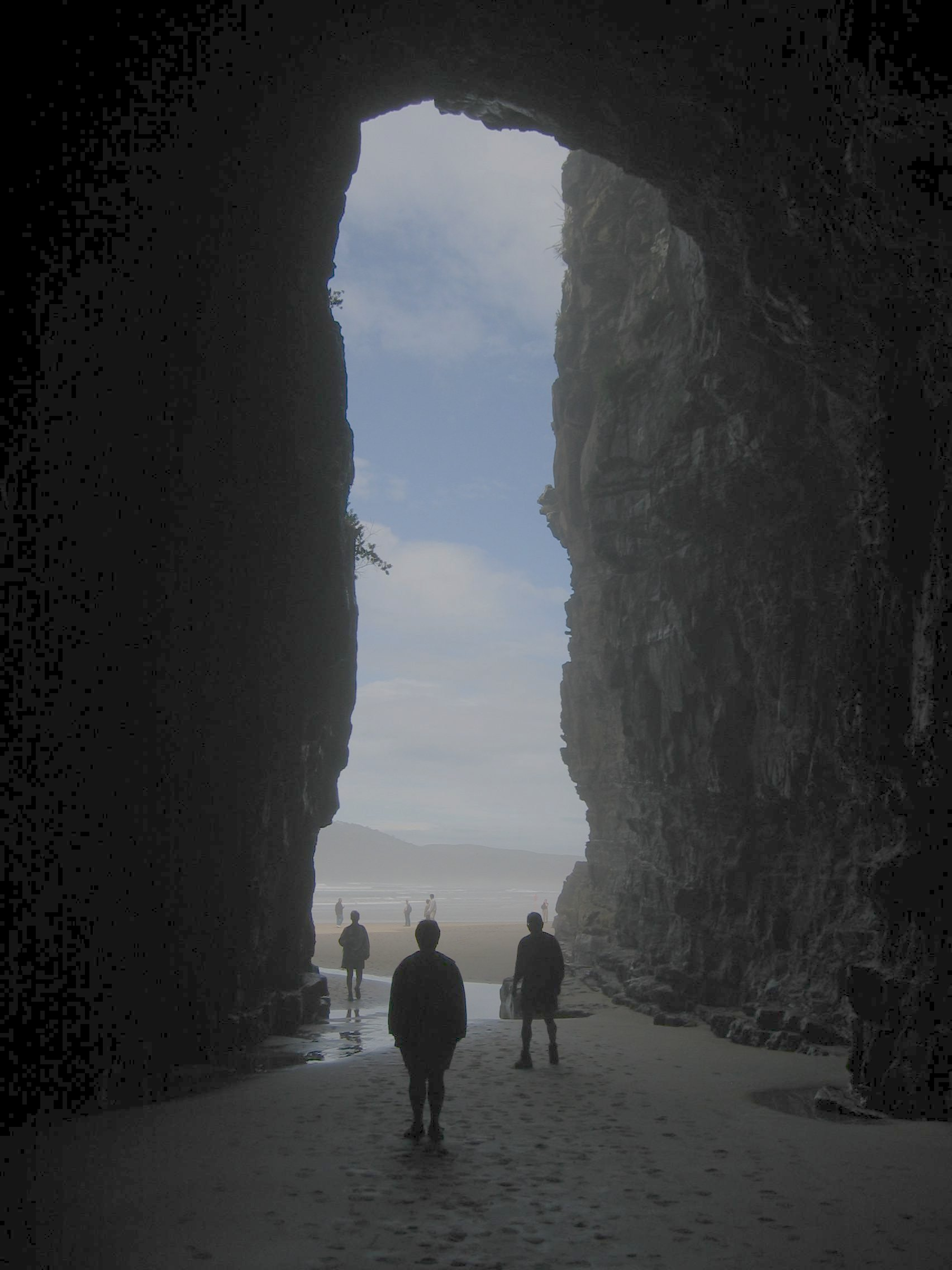
The Cathedral Caves, one of the Catlins' most popular tourist attractions

The early European economy of the Catlins during the 1830s and 1840s centred on whaling and sealing. The exploitation of the forests for timber started in the 1860s with the rapid growth of the city of Dunedin as a result of the goldrush of 1861–62. In the early 1870s more timber cargo was loaded at Owaka than at any other New Zealand port. Forestry and sawmilling declined in the late 1880s once the easily accessible timber had been removed. The extension of the railway beyond Owaka breathed new life into these industries, however, with activity peaking during the 1920s.

The land cleared of trees largely became pasture. From the 1880s, clearing of land for dairy farming increased, especially in the areas around Tahakopa and the Ōwaka River valley. Considerable sheep and dairy farming continues on the cleared hills on the periphery of the region, and this accounts for much of the Catlins' income. A rural polytechnic specialising in agricultural science (Telford Rural Polytechnic) is located south of Balclutha close to the northeastern edge of the Catlins.

Fishing and tourism now account for much of the area's economy. The rugged natural scenery, sense of isolation, and natural attractions such as Cathedral Caves makes the Catlins a popular destination for weekend trips by people from Dunedin and Invercargill, the two nearest cities. A large number of cribs (holiday cottages) occur at places such as Jack's Bay and Pounawea. Ecotourism is becoming increasingly important to the area's economy, with many of the visitors coming from overseas. Tourism added an estimated $2.4 million to the region's economy in 2003.

== Transport ==
The Southern Scenic Route links Fiordland and Dunedin via the Catlins. Here it runs northeast to southwest as an alternative road to State Highway 1, which skirts the Catlins to the northwest. This section of the Southern Scenic Route—formerly designated State Highway 92 but no longer listed as a state highway—winds through most of the small settlements in the area, and was only completely sealed during the late 1990s (a stretch of about 15 km (9 mi) southwest of Tautuku was surfaced with gravel prior to that time). The settlements of Owaka, Maclennan, Papatowai, Tokanui, and Fortrose all lie on this route. A coastal route also parallels the inland highway between Waikawa and Fortrose, but only about two thirds of this road is sealed.

The remaining small roads in the district, all of which link with the former State Highway, have gravel surfaces. These roads mainly link the main route with small coastal settlements, although gravel roads also extend along the valleys of the Ōwaka and Tahakopa Rivers, linking the main Catlins route with the small towns of Clinton and Wyndham respectively. The gravelled Waikawa Valley Road crosses the hills to join the Tahakopa-Wyndham route.

Several of the area's coastal settlements have facilities for small boats, but generally only fishing and holiday craft use them; no regular passenger or freight-boat service runs to the Catlins. A railway line, the Catlins River Branch, linked the area with the South Island Main Trunk Line from the late 19th century. Construction of this line began in 1879, but it did not reach Owaka until 1896. Construction progressed slowly due to the difficult terrain, and the final terminus of the line at Tahakopa was not completed until 1915. The economic viability of the line declined with the sawmills that it was built to serve, and the line was eventually closed in 1971. Parts of the line's route are now accessible as walkways, among them a 240 m (790 ft) long tunnel ("Tunnel Hill") between Owaka and Glenomaru.

== Government ==
The Catlins is split between the Invercargill and Southland (previously Clutha-Southland) electorates in the New Zealand Parliament. Between 1996 and 2014, Bill English of the National Party, who was Prime Minister of New Zealand and a former Leader of the Opposition, was the member for Clutha-Southland. The Catlins area is split between the Clutha and Southland Districts for local government purposes.

Most of the Catlins falls in the Clutha District, based in Balclutha, and one of the council's fourteen representatives is elected directly from a Catlins Ward which is roughly coterminous with this area. The Clutha District is itself part of the Otago Region, controlled administratively by the Otago Regional Council (ORC) in Dunedin, 80 km (50 mi) to the northeast of Balclutha. The Molyneux Constituency of the ORC, which covers roughly the same area as the Clutha District, elects two councillors to the 12-member Regional Council.

Approximately the westernmost one-third of the Catlins area lies in the Southland District, based in Invercargill, 50 km (31 mi) to the west of Fortrose. One of the council's 12 elected members represents the Toetoes Ward, which contains this part of the Catlins, along with an area around Wyndham and extending along Toetoes Bay towards the Awarua Plain. The Southland District is itself part of the Southland Region, controlled administratively by the Southland Regional Council (SRC; also known as Environment Southland), which is also based in Invercargill. The Southern Constituency of the SRC, which covers the entire Toetoes Ward and extends across the Awarua Plain almost as far as Bluff in the west and Mataura in the north, elects one councillor to the 12-member Regional Council.

== Education ==
The Catlins area hosts four co-educational schools: Tahakopa School, Tokanui School, and Romahapa School, all of which are primary schools; The Catlins Area School, Owaka is a combined primary and secondary school. It is the only one of the four with more than 100 pupils. The nearest dedicated secondary schools are South Otago High School in Balclutha and Menzies College in Wyndham.

The nearest tertiary institution is Telford Rural Polytechnic, located at the edge of the Catlins at Otanomomo, south of Balclutha.

== Medical services ==
A hospital opened in Owaka in 1924, offering a decreasing range of services until its closure during the 1980s. The building and grounds now host a youth hostel and holiday park. Today, Owaka is served by a medical centre and a pharmacy. The Southern District Health Board is responsible for most publicly funded health services in Otago and Southland, including the Catlins.

The nearest hospital to most of the area is the community owned Clutha Health First, in Balclutha. There is another small hospital in Gore, a secondary level hospital in Invercargill, and a tertiary level hospital (Dunedin Hospital) in Dunedin. The last two are also university teaching hospitals.

== See also ==
- McLean Falls
