= Cathedral Caves =

Sea cave in New Zealand's South Island

- Cave
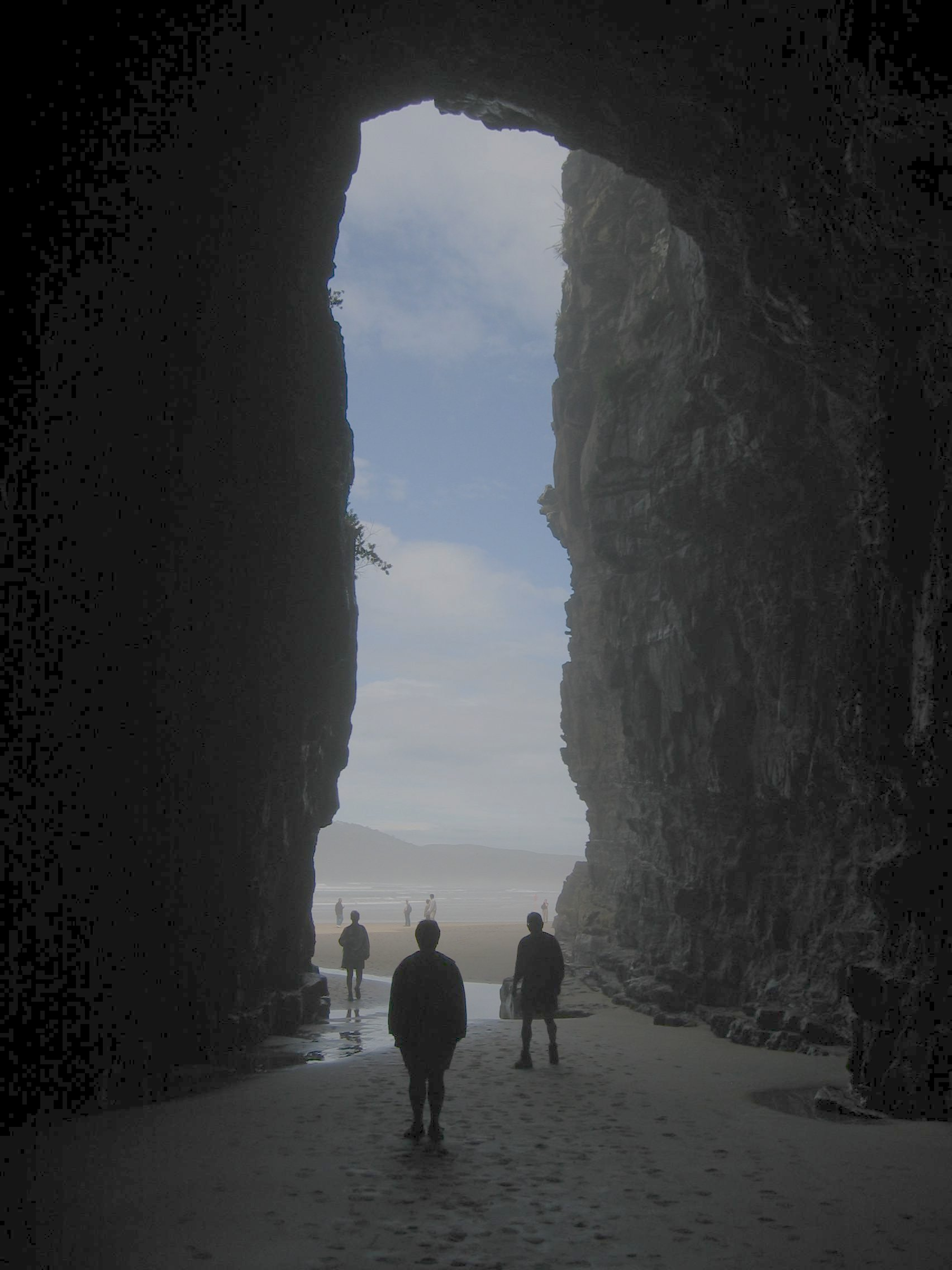
- Inside the Cathedral Cave

- Coordinates: 46°36′30.40″S 169°22′52.56″E
- Age: 160 mya
- Geology: Sandstone
- Operator: Kāi Tahu
- Website: https://www.cathedralcaves.co.nz/

The Cathedral Caves is a large V shaped limestone sea cave located on Waipati Beach, 15 kilometres (9.3 mi) south of Papatowai, on the Catlins Coast in the southeast corner of New Zealand's South Island. The two main entrances join together within the cliff to form one big cave. One arm of the cave has a 30 metres (98 ft) high ceiling. Often blue penguins will emerge from the gloom at the far end of the cave. And occasionally a sealion might be around.

The 199m-long cave is formed in Jurassic sandstone (about 160 million years old) of the Murihiku Terrane, though the cave itself is much younger, ten to hundreds of thousands of years old. They were named by Thomas Hocken who noted how the caves reverberated noise and their resemblance to European cathedrals. The cave access road gate is open during summer - October to approx mid April and only accessible when conditions are safe - see Cathedral Caves website for opening times. A small entry charge for use of the access road is managed by Kāi Tahu descendants.

Cathedral Caves
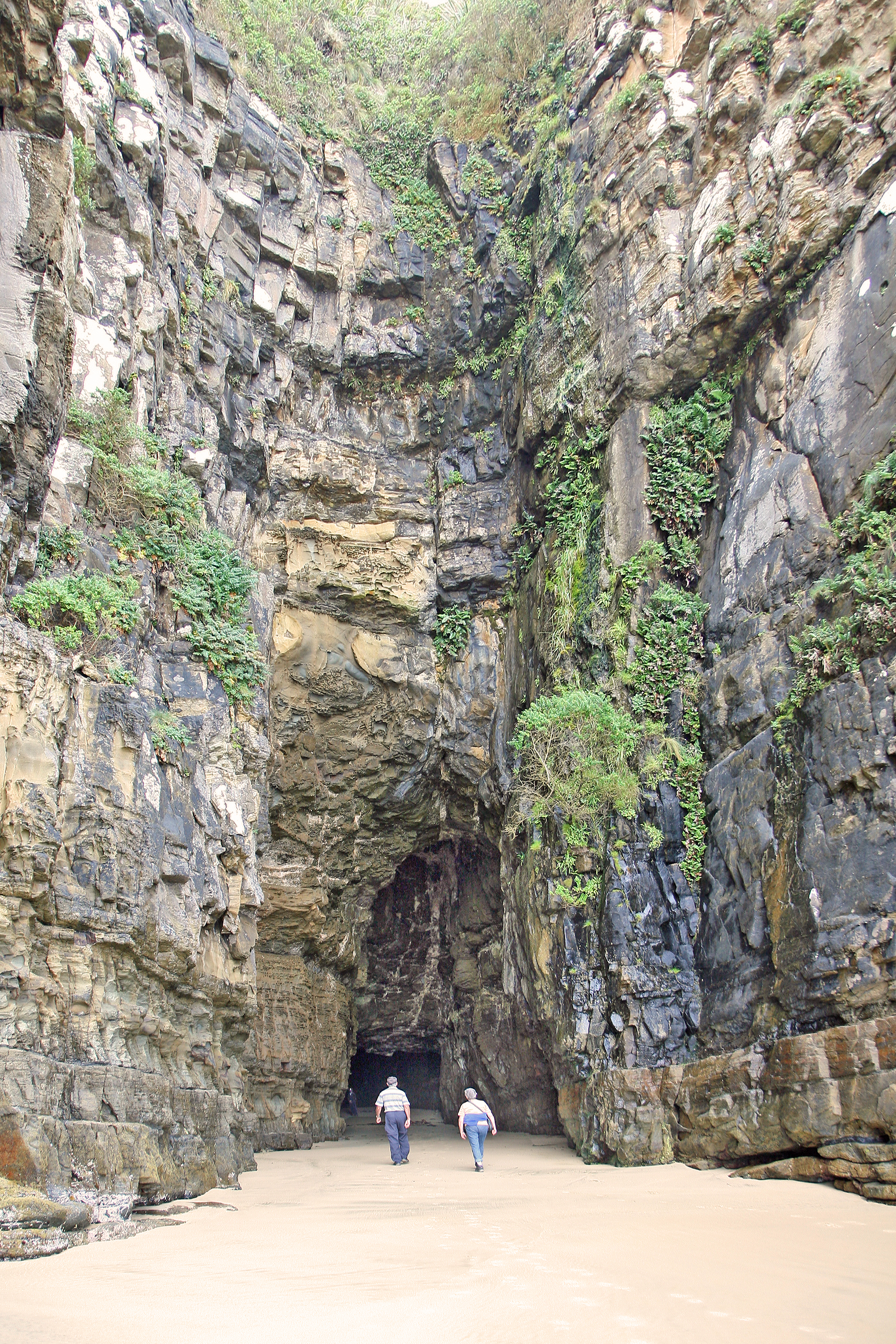
The exterior of the cave entrance

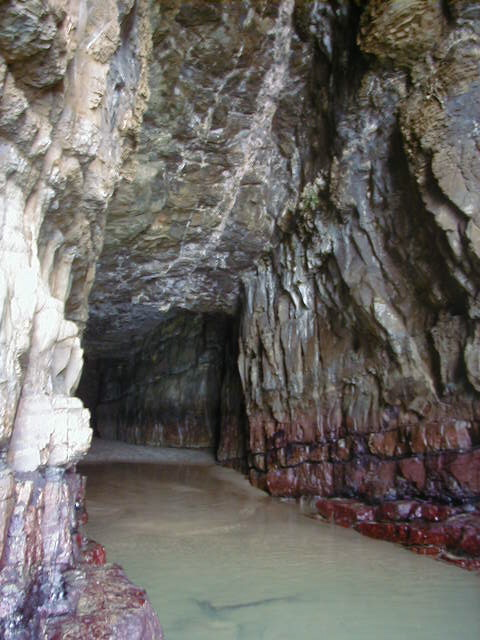
The interior of the cave

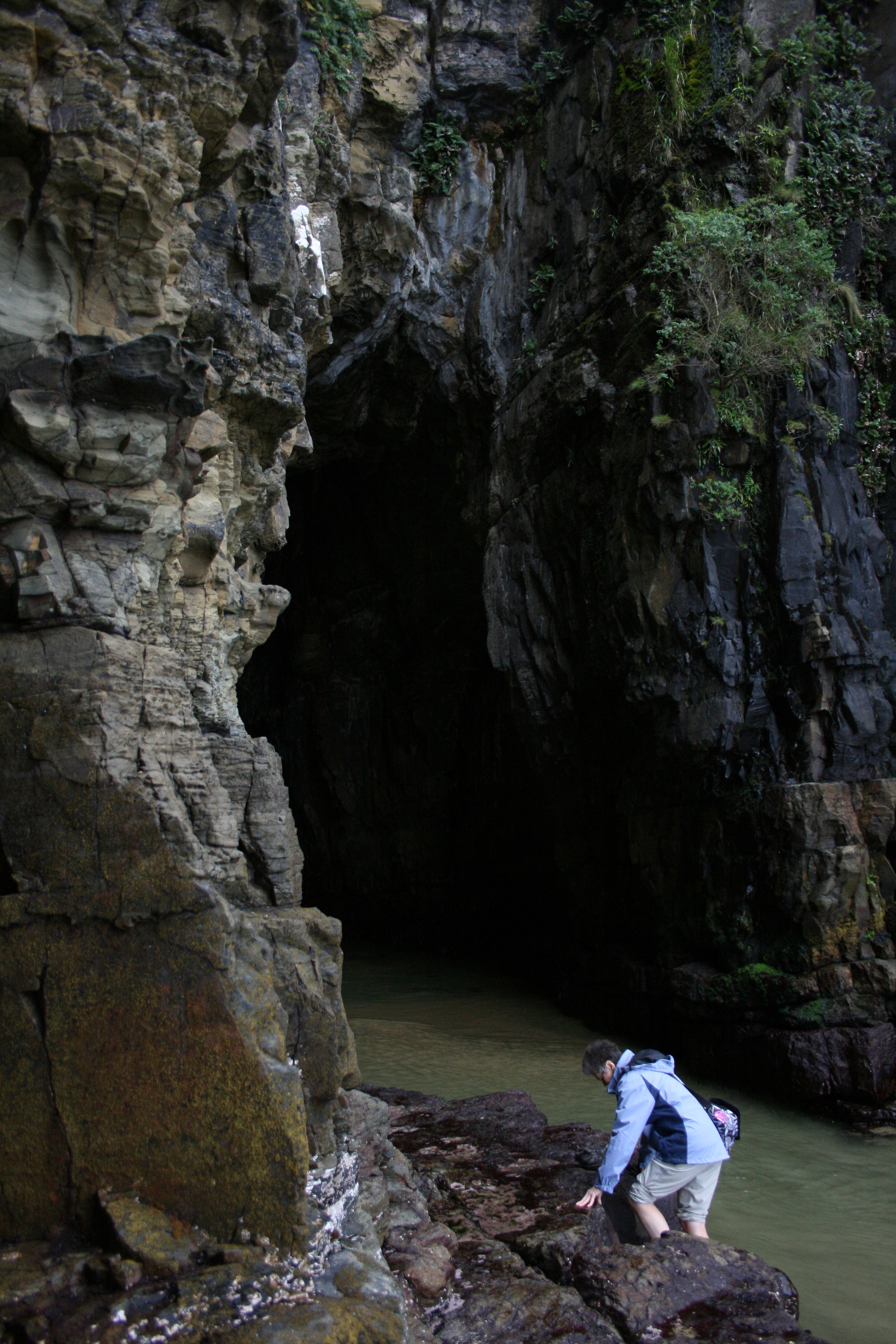
The entrance to the cave

== See also ==
- List of caves in New Zealand
