= Waikawa =

Waikawa is the name of various locations in New Zealand.

- Waikawa, Southland
- Waikawa, Marlborough
- Waikawa Beach, a small settlement in the Horowhenua District
- Waikawa River in Southland
- Portland Island (New Zealand), known in Māori as Waikawa
