= Forest Range =

Forest Range can refer to:

- Forest range, an administrative divisional unit used in managing forests in India, Pakistan and Bangladesh
- Forest Range, South Australia, a town in Australia
- Forest Range (New Zealand) a range of hills, part of the Catlins Ranges, South Island, New Zealand
