= SS Tararua =

1864 passenger steamboat

Coordinates: 46.6686°S 168.8622°E

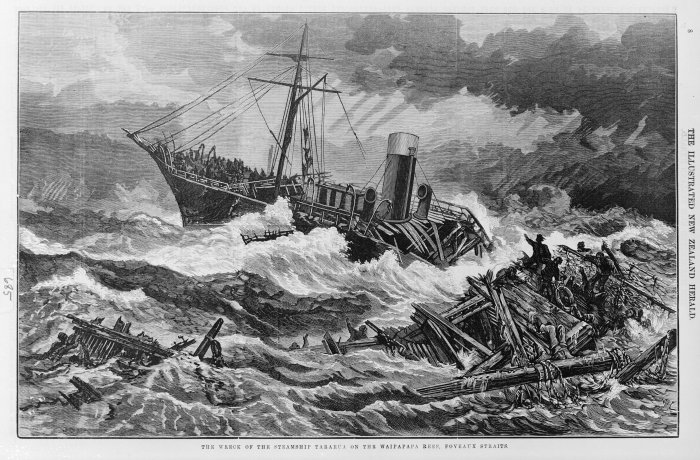
- Contemporary portrayal of the wreck

History
- Name: S.S Tararua
- Owner: Union Steam Ship Company
- Builder: Gourlay Brothers, Dundee
- Launched: 21 April 1864
- Completed: 1864
- Maiden voyage: Unknown
- In service: 1864
- Out of service: 29 April 1881
- Fate: Struck fast to Otara Reef at Waipapa point on 29 April 1881

General characteristics
- Type: Screw-driven steamer
- Tonnage: Originally 523, Increased to 563
- Length: 222.6 ft (67.8 m)
- Height: 222.6 ft (67.8m)
- Depth: 16.2 ft (4.9 m)

SS Tararua was a passenger steamer that struck the reef off Waipapa Point in the Catlins on 29 April 1881, and sank the next day, in the worst civilian shipping disaster in New Zealand's history. Of the 151 passengers and crew on board, only 20 survived the shipwreck.

== Ship ==
The Tararua was a screw-driven steamer with two 155-horsepower (116 kW) engines, measuring 222.6 ft (67.8 m) long, 28 ft (8.5 m) wide and 16.2 ft (4.9 m) deep. Built in Dundee by Gourlay Brothers in 1864, her original capacity was 523 tons (net) but alterations later increased her net tonnage to 563 tons.

== History ==
=== Grounding ===
On 20 December 1865. Tararua ran aground at Cape Farewell, New Zealand whilst on a voyage from Sydney, New South Wales to Nelson, New Zealand. She was refloated the next day and completed her voyage.

=== Wreck ===
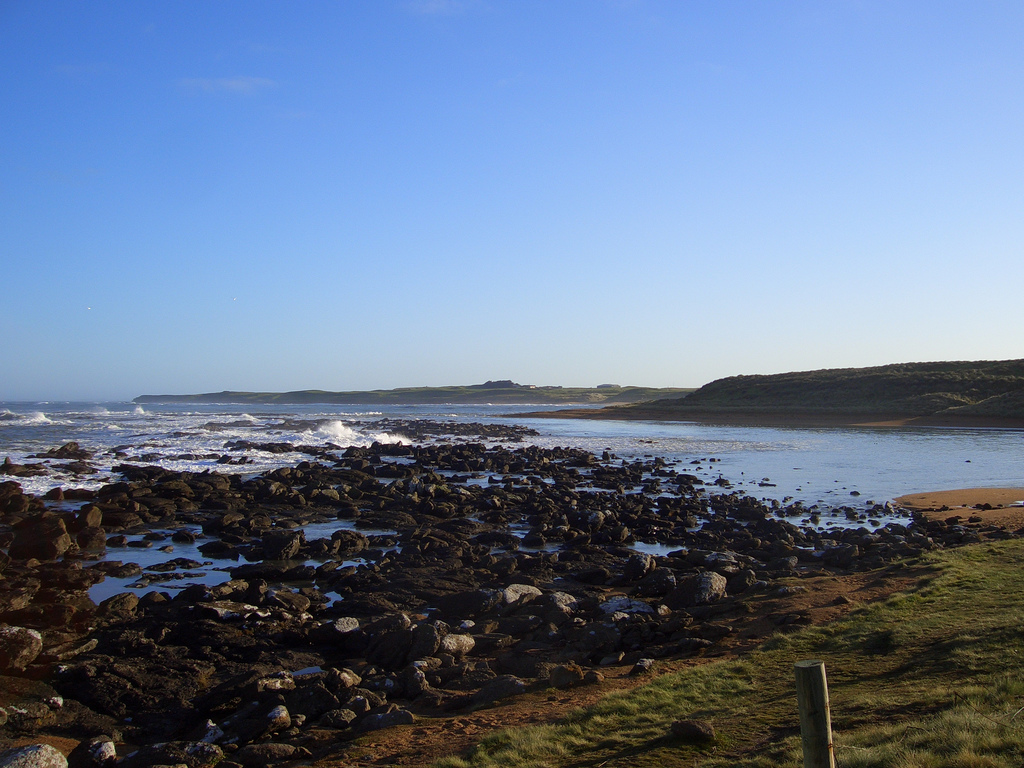
The reef on a fine day

Sailing from Port Chalmers, Dunedin at 5 pm on 29 April 1881, the Tararua was en route to Melbourne via Bluff and Hobart. Steering by land on a dark night, with clear skies overhead but a haze over the land, the captain turned the ship west at 4 am believing they had cleared the southernmost point. After breakers were heard at 4:25 am, they steered away to the W by S-half-S for 20 minutes before heading west again. At around 5 am, the ship struck the Otara Reef, which runs 13 km (8 mi) out from Waipapa Point.

Waves caused the SS Tararua to list to port. George Lawrence got in a boat and then jumped into the waves to swim ashore to warn a man named Charles Gilbee who rode his horse to Wyndham to send a message. At 11 am a wave caused the bridge to fall. At 1 pm, it was not marked urgent. At 2 pm the Tararua started to break apart, and it took until 5 pm for the Hawea to leave port with supplies. Meanwhile, the wind and waves had risen. Around noon, six passengers who were strong swimmers were taken close to shore; three managed to get through the surf, with the help of the earlier volunteer, but the others drowned. On a return trip, one man attempted to get ashore on the reef, but had to give up; another three drowned trying to swim to the beach. Eight of the ship's nine crew survived, and the locals who had gathered on the shore could not repair it. The remaining boat could no longer reach the ship, due to the waves, and stood out to sea in the hope of flagging down a passing ship to help. The Tararua took over 20 hours to sink, with the stern going under around 10 pm a voice yelled out “a boat for God’s sake a boat”. The last cries of the victims were heard at 2:30 am when a loud crash was heard before a loud cry then stillness.

About 74 bodies were recovered, of which 55 were buried in a nearby plot that came to be known as the "Tararua Acre". Three gravestones and a memorial plinth remain there today.

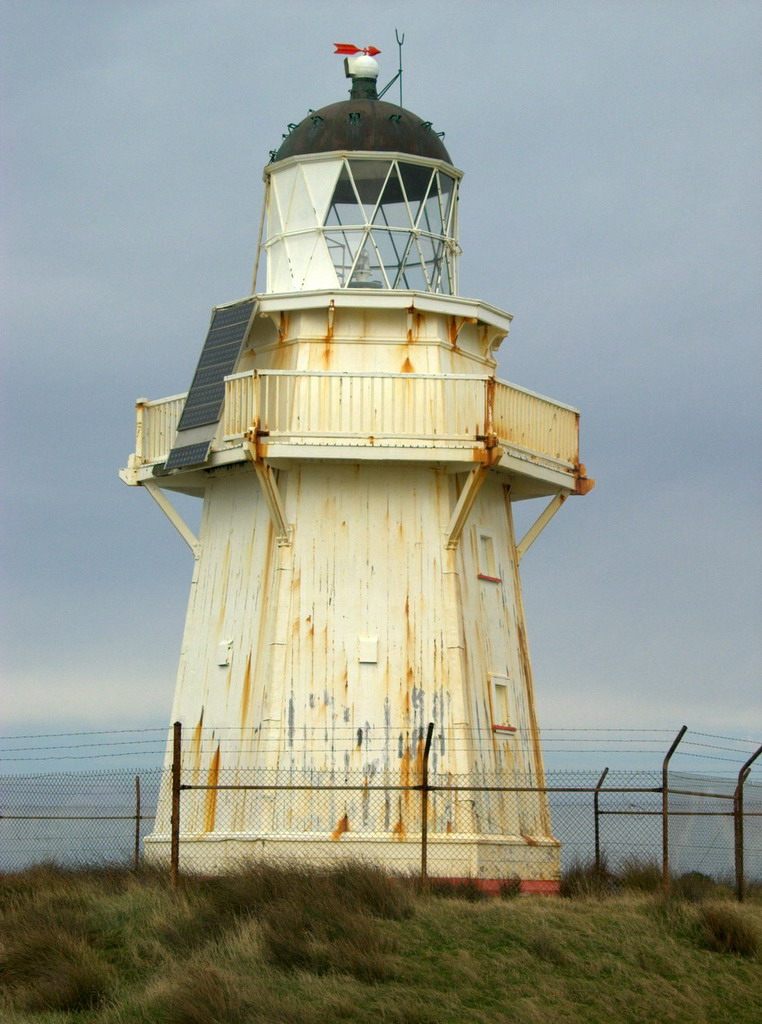
Waipapa Point lighthouse, built after the wreck

== Inquiry ==
A court of inquiry found that the disaster was primarily caused by the ship's captain, F. G. Garrard, failing to establish his correct position at 4 am before changing course to head west. An able-bodied seaman was also blamed for not keeping a proper lookout, from which breakers would have been heard in time to avoid the reef. The court recommended that steamers should carry enough lifebelts for all their passengers (there were only twelve on the Tararua) and that a lighthouse should be built at Waipapa Point. The lighthouse began operating in 1884.

== See also ==
- List of disasters in New Zealand by death toll
