= Catlins Ranges =

Coordinates: 46°25′0″S 169°20′0″E

The Catlins Ranges are a series of rugged, roughly parallel hill ranges in the southeastern corner of New Zealand's South Island.

The Catlins Ranges take their name from the name given to this part of the country – the Catlins. The ranges lie mostly in Otago, although their western extremes lie in Southland Region. The original land purchaser was whaling captain Edward Cattlin (sometimes spelt Catlin). He purchased an extensive block of land along Catlins River on 15 February 1840 from Kāi Tahu chief Hone Tūhawaiki (also known as "Bloody Jack") for muskets and £30 (roughly NZ$3000 in 2005 dollars). However, New Zealand's land commissioners declined to endorse the purchase.

There are four distinct ranges: the small Rata and Beresford Ranges in the northeast, the Maclennan Range in the southwest, and the Forest Range, which can be considered as an extension of the Maclennan Range. Each of these ranges is oriented along a northwest–southeast axis. The ranges are separated by the valleys of the Catlins and Tahakopa Rivers. Inland, close to the watersheds of these rivers, the boundaries between the ranges become indistinct, part of the reason why they are often grouped together under the one name.

The Maclennan Range is the largest of the ranges in terms of length, being some 25 km (15 mi) in length, but most of the highest hills are found inland in the area where the ranges are not easily differentiated. The highest point in the Catlins Ranges is the 720 m (2361 ft) summit of Mt. Pye, which is located 25 km (40 mi) north-northeast of Waikawa. Other prominent peaks include Mt Rosebery (719 m; 2359 ft), Ajax Hill (698 m; 2290 ft), Catlins Cone (698 m; 2290 ft), and Mt Tautuku (691 m; 2266 ft).
