= Curio Bay =

Coastal embayment in New Zealand

Coordinates: 46°39′44.44″S 169°05′52.52″E

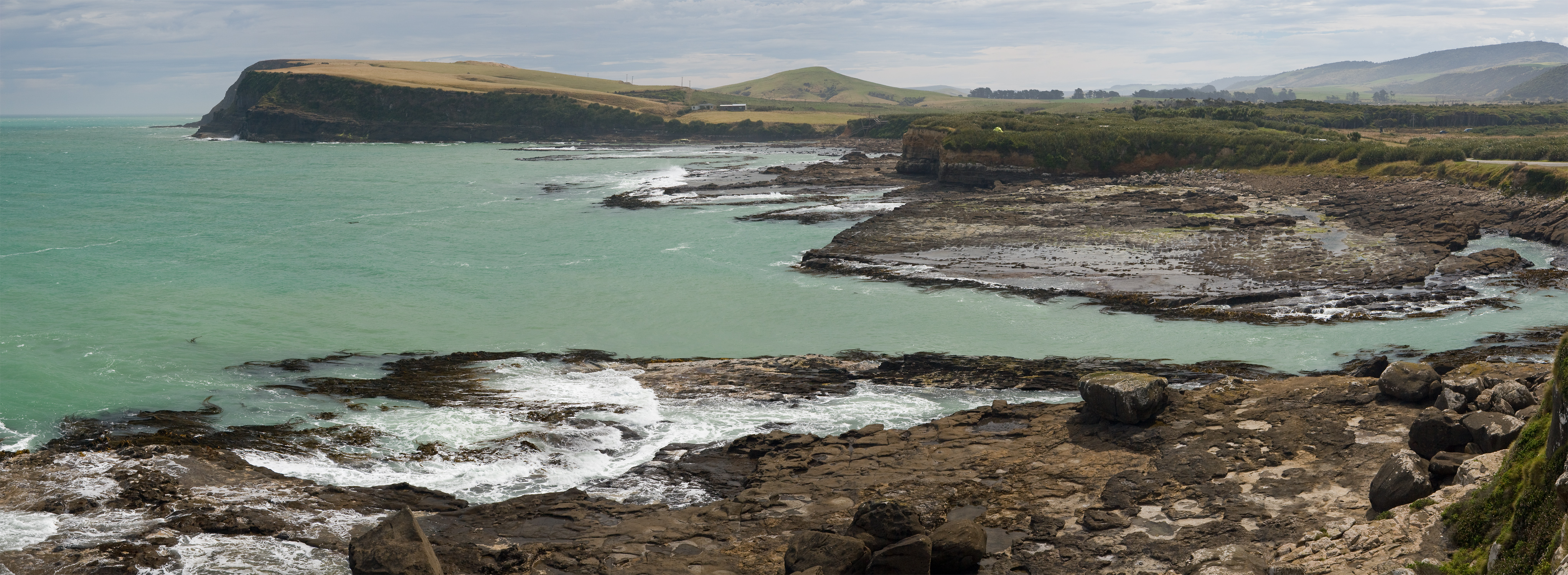
Curio Bay panorama

Curio Bay is a coastal embayment in the Southland District of New Zealand, best known as the site of a petrified forest some 180 million years old. It also hosts a yellow-eyed penguin colony, arguably the rarest of penguin species, with approximately 1600 breeding pairs in the extant population. The bay, along with neighbouring Porpoise Bay, is home to the endemic Hector's dolphin. Southern right whales are occasionally observed offshore, as on numerous parts of the country's coast. Located near the southernmost point of the South Island, Curio Bay is one of the major attractions in the Catlins, attracting around 100,000 visitors per year. The town of Waikawa has an information centre for tourists.

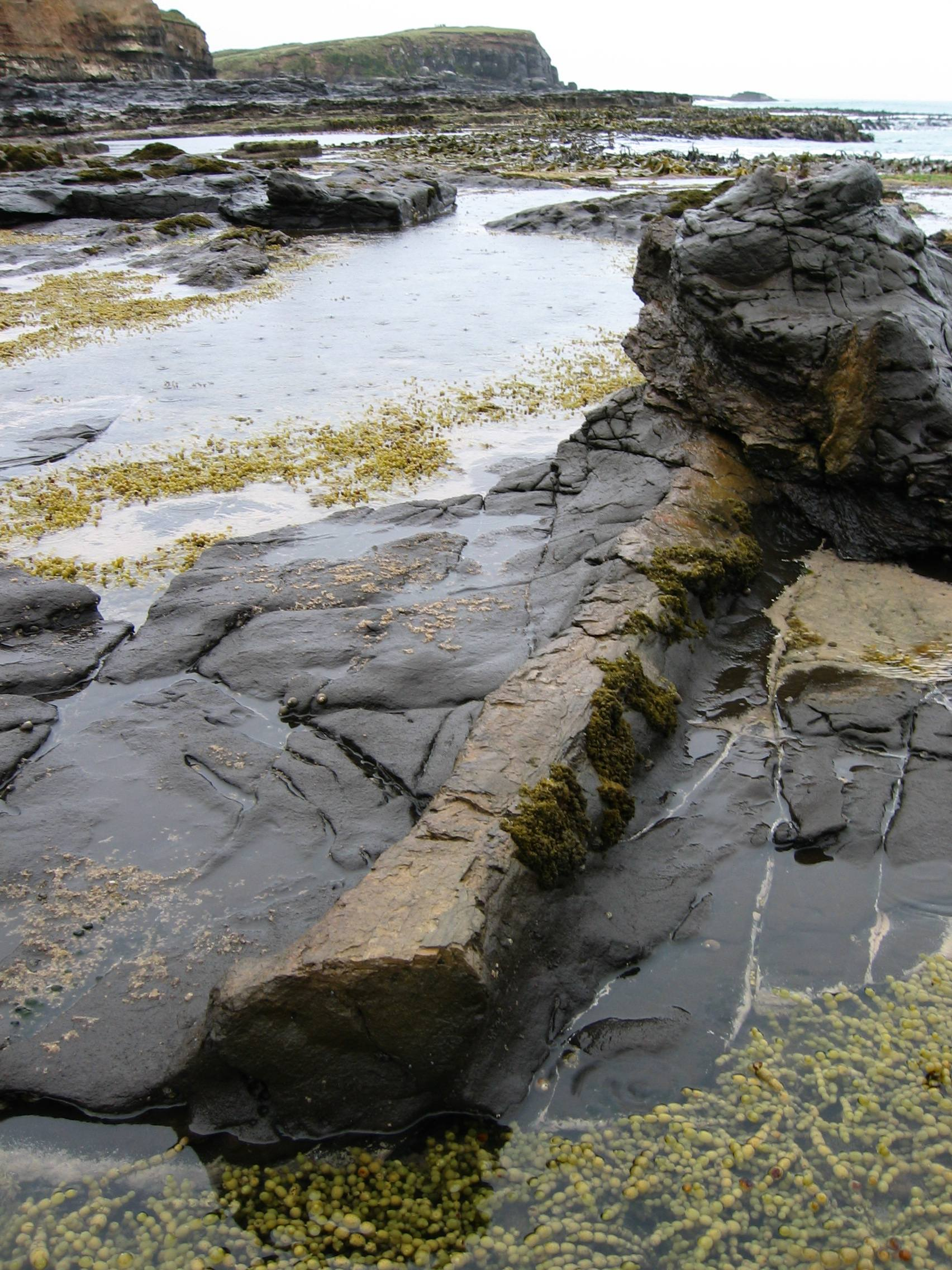
A petrified log at Curio Bay with Hormosira banksii growing nearby

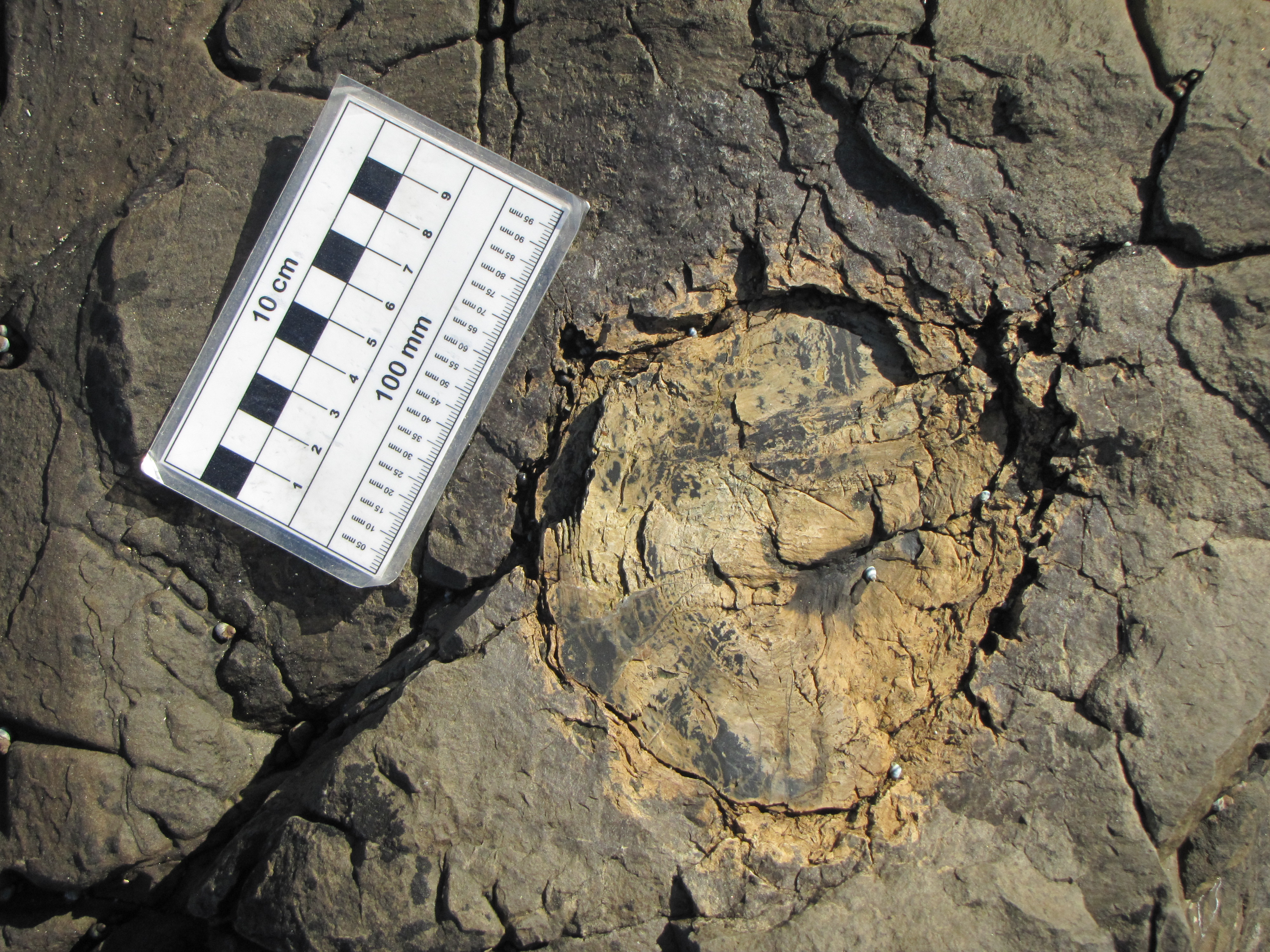
Fossil tree stump with growth rings

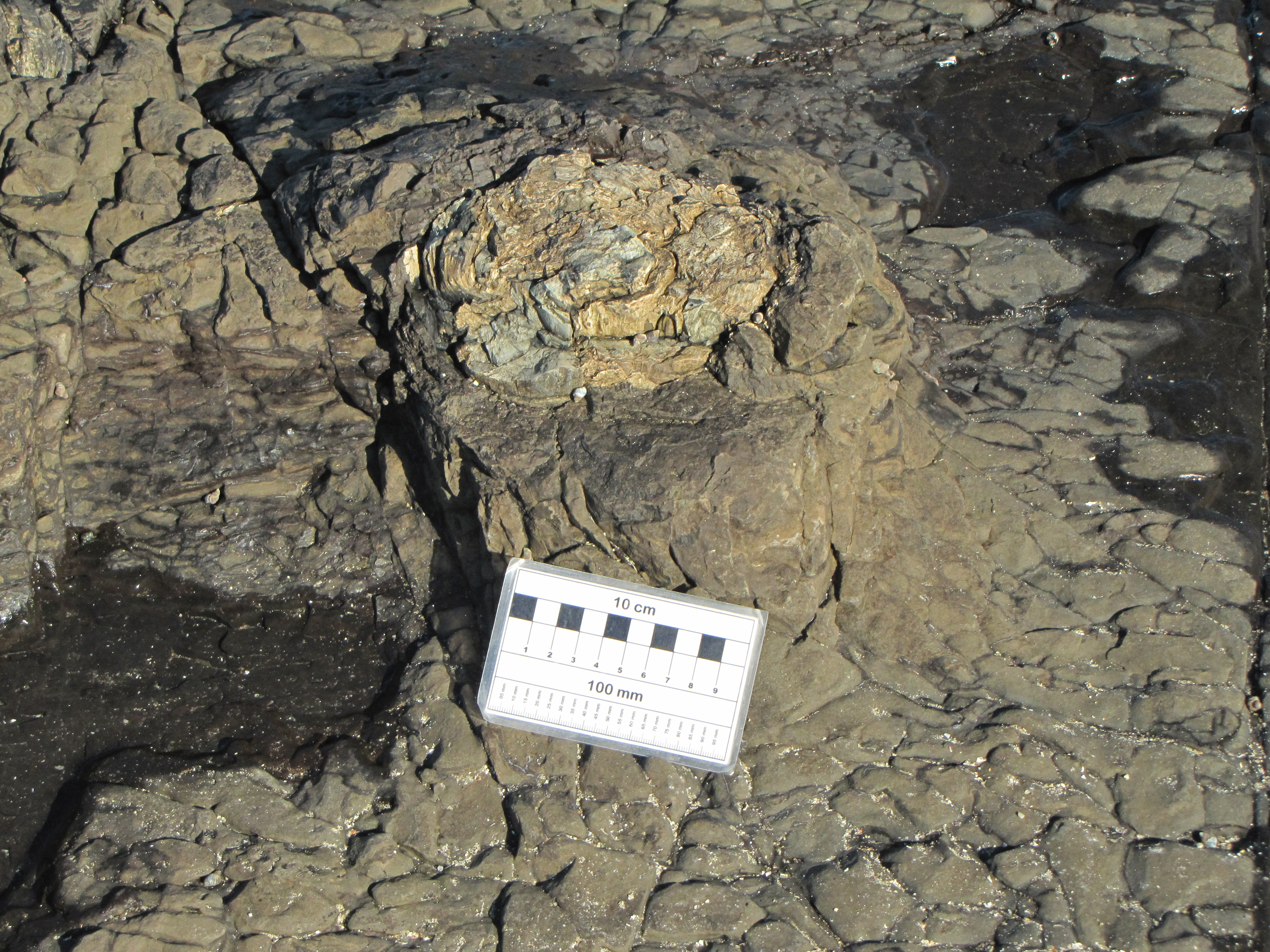
Fossil tree stump with growth rings

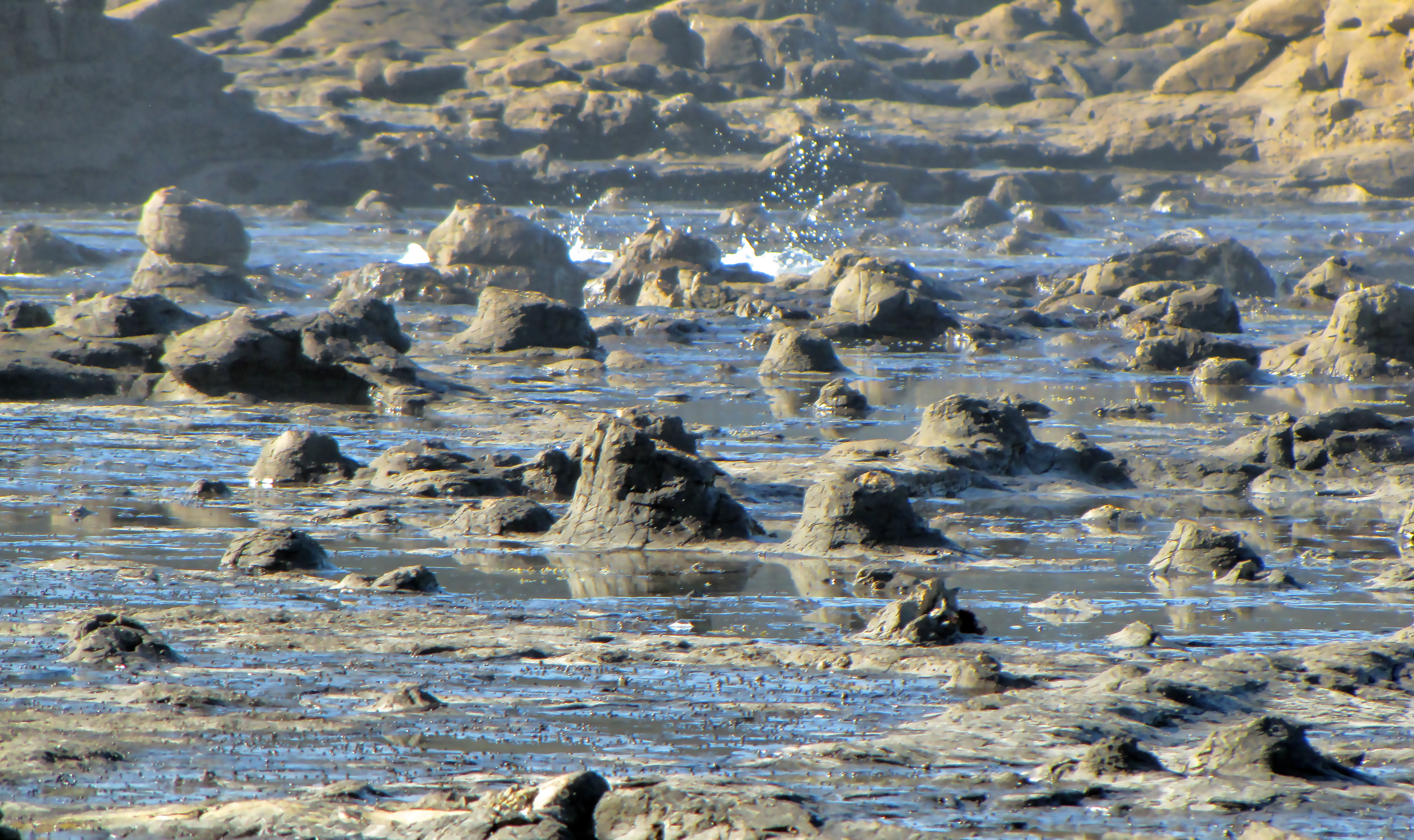
Many fossil tree stumps are scattered along the tidal platform. Tree density of the Curio Bay Jurassic forest is thought to have been about 552–851 trees/ha.

The now petrified logs, from ancient conifers closely related to modern kauri and Norfolk pine, were buried by ancient volcanic mud flows and gradually replaced by silica to produce the fossils now exposed by the sea.

The fossilised forest grew at a time of semi-tropical climate and before grasses and flowering plants had come into existence. The original forest of cycads, conifers and ferns was buried by massive floods of ash and volcanic debris either directly from a volcanic eruption or from later heavy rain on a barren volcanic mountain. Distinct bands of fossilised vegetation exposed in the cliff face indicate that in between such floods, the forest grew back at least four times over a period of some 20,000 years. Following this, the area remained buried over millions of years. Silica started to impregnate the wood and eventually turned it into stone, preserving not just tree stumps and wood, but in some places also fern fronds and leaves.

Known fossil forests of this age are very few throughout the world, and this is one of the most extensive and least disturbed of them. The overall area stretches for 20 kilometres (12 mi) from Curio Bay to Slope Point.

At low tide, the remaining tree stumps and logs are exposed and clearly visible. A short walkway leads from the car park at the end of the sealed road to a viewing platform over this internationally important area. It is strictly prohibited to damage or remove anything from the area.

== Bibliography ==
- R. Buckingham and J. Hall-Jones. 1985. The Catlins. Invercargill: Department of Conservation. ISBN 0-477-05758-6.
- N. Peat. 1998. The Catlins and the Southern Scenic Route. Dunedin: University of Otago Press. ISBN 1-877133-42-6.
- Pole, M. 1999. Structure of a near-polar latitude forest from the New Zealand Jurassic. Palaeogeogr. Palaeoclimatol. Palaeoecol. 147:121–139.
