= Tahakopa River =

River in New Zealand

Coordinates: 46°34′S 169°29′E

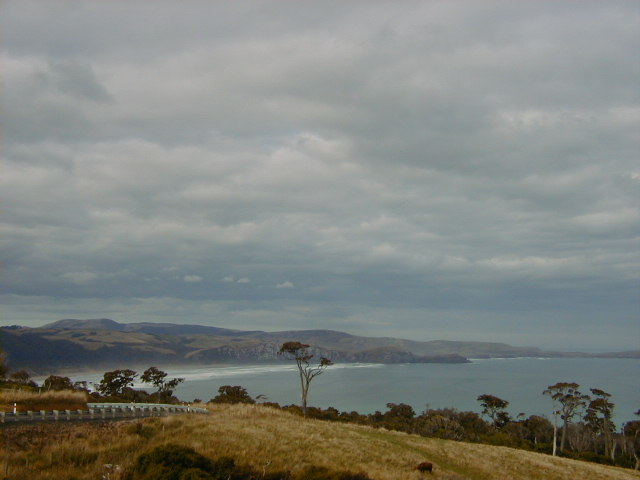
Tahoka Bay

The Tahakopa River flows southeastward through the Catlins, an area of the southern South Island of New Zealand. Its total length is 32 kilometres (20 mi), and it flows into the Pacific Ocean 30 kilometres (19 mi) east of Waikawa, close to the settlement of Papatowai. The Maclennan River is a tributary.

The river's source is to the west of Mount Pye, 25 kilometres (16 mi) east of Wyndham.
