= Pounawea =

- Interactive map of Pounawea
- Country: New Zealand
- Region: Otago
- District: Clutha District
- Ward: Catlins
- Electorates: Southland; Te Tai Tonga (Māori)

Government
  - Territorial authority: Clutha District Council
  - Regional council: Otago Regional Council
  - Mayor of Clutha: Jock Martin
  - Southland MP: Joseph Mooney
  - Te Tai Tonga MP: Tākuta Ferris

Area
  - Total: 0.37 km^{2} (0.14 sq mi)

Population (June 2025)
  - Total: 120
  - Density: 320/km^{2} (840/sq mi)

Pounawea is a small town in The Catlins, an area of the southern South Island of New Zealand. It is located four kilometres southwest of Owaka, at the mouth of the Catlins River. It is a popular holiday spot with a seasonal population, there are numerous cribs (holiday homes) at the settlement.

== Demographics ==
Pounawea is described by Statistics New Zealand as a rural settlement. It covers 0.37 km^{2} (0.14 sq mi), and had an estimated population of 120 as of June 2025, with a population density of 324 people per km^{2}. It is part of the much larger Catlins statistical area.

Historical population
Year	Pop.	±% p.a.
2006	54	—
2013	63	+2.23%
2018	51	−4.14%

Pounawea had a population of 51 at the 2018 New Zealand census, a decrease of 12 people (−19.0%) since the 2013 census, and a decrease of 3 people (−5.6%) since the 2006 census. There were 24 households, comprising 24 males and 30 females, giving a sex ratio of 0.8 males per female. The median age was 55.2 years (compared with 37.4 years nationally), with 6 people (11.8%) aged under 15 years, 3 (5.9%) aged 15 to 29, 30 (58.8%) aged 30 to 64, and 15 (29.4%) aged 65 or older.

Ethnicities were 94.1% European/Pākehā, 5.9% Māori, 5.9% Pasifika, 5.9% Asian, and 5.9% other ethnicities. People may identify with more than one ethnicity.

Although some people chose not to answer the census's question about religious affiliation, 58.8% had no religion, 41.2% were Christian, and 5.9% were Buddhist.

Of those at least 15 years old, 3 (6.7%) people had a bachelor's or higher degree, and 9 (20.0%) people had no formal qualifications. The median income was $26,300, compared with $31,800 nationally. 6 people (13.3%) earned over $70,000 compared to 17.2% nationally. The employment status of those at least 15 was that 24 (53.3%) people were employed full-time, and 6 (13.3%) were part-time.
