= Mokoreta River =

River in New Zealand

Coordinates: 46°21′S 168°51′E

The Mokoreta River is a river in Southland, New Zealand. A tributary of the Mataura River, its source is between Mt Rosebery and Catlins Cone, close to the source of the Catlins River. It flows westward from the Catlins Ranges into the Southland Plains. Its total length is 50 kilometres (31 mi), and it flows into the Mataura River about 5 kilometres (3 mi) south of the town of Wyndham. Mokoreta River is a location for the fishing of brown trout.
