= Maclennan River =

River in the South Island of New Zealand

Coordinates: 46°33′S 169°29′E

MacLennan River
- Location of the Maclennan River

Location
- Country: New Zealand

The Maclennan River is a river of New Zealand, a tributary of the Tahakopa River.

== See also ==
- List of rivers of New Zealand
