= Waipapa Point =

Promontory in New Zealand

Coordinates: 46.659978°S 168.847047°E

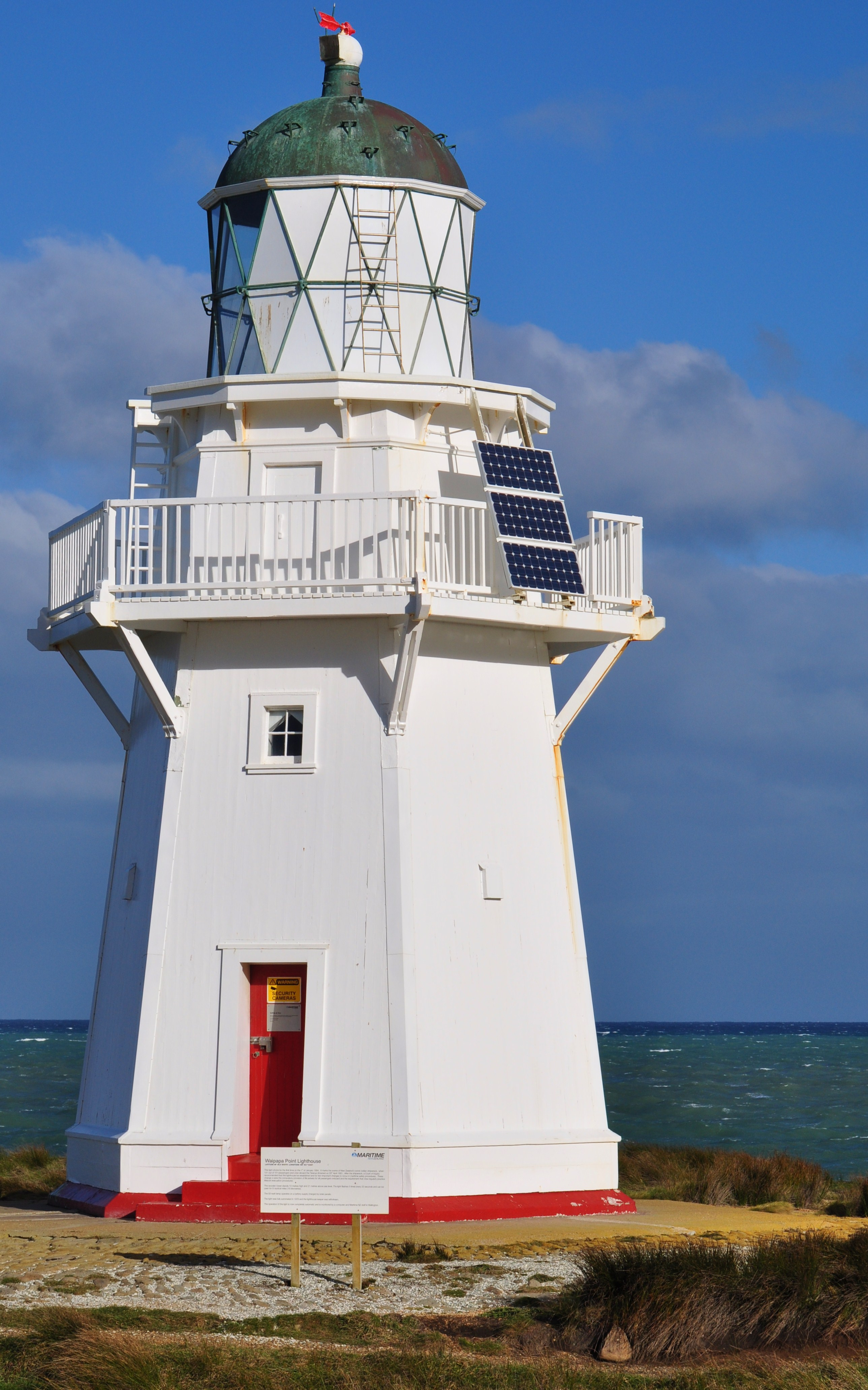
The Waipapa Point lighthouse was built after the Tararua shipwreck

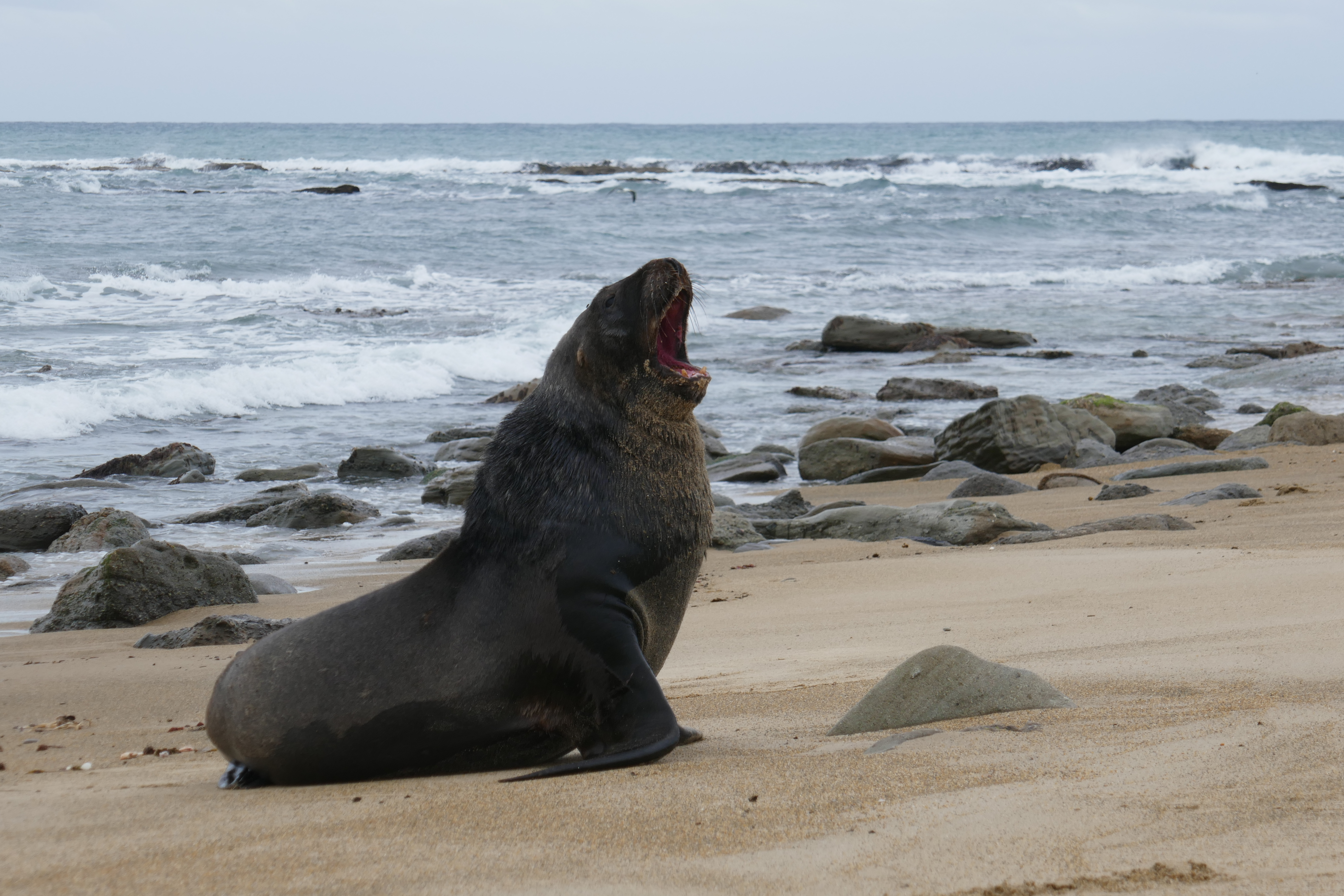
A sea lion at Waipapa Point

Waipapa Point is a rocky promontory on the south coast of Foveaux Strait, the South Island of New Zealand. It is located 10 kilometres (6.2 mi) southeast of the mouth of the Mataura River, at the extreme southwestern end of the area known as the Catlins.

The coastline of the Catlins is notoriously dangerous, and there have been many shipwrecks in the region. The most notable of these, and also one of New Zealand's worst shipping disasters, was the wreck of the passenger steamer Tararua, en route from Port Chalmers to Melbourne via Bluff, which foundered off Waipapa Point on 29 April 1881 with the loss of all but 20 of the 151 people aboard.

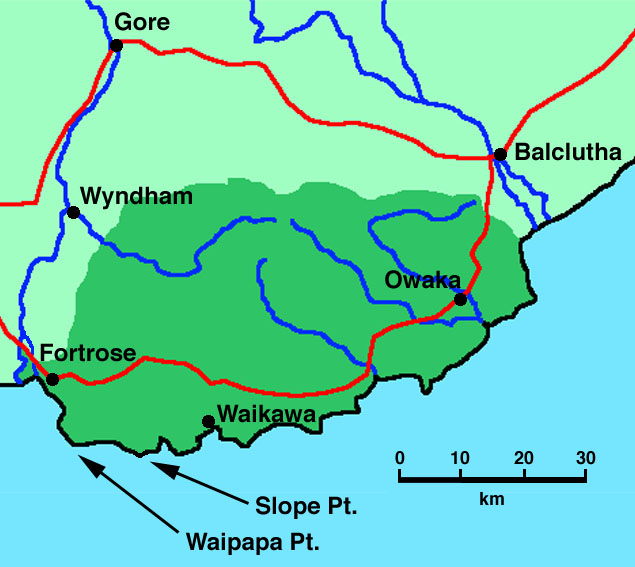
Waipapa Point lies in the far southwest of the Catlins.

A lighthouse was built on the point in response to the tragedy; it began operating in 1884. With its sibling, the retired Kaipara North Head lighthouse, this was one of the last two wooden lighthouses built in New Zealand. It is still active, and was automated in 1976.
