= Lake Wilkie =

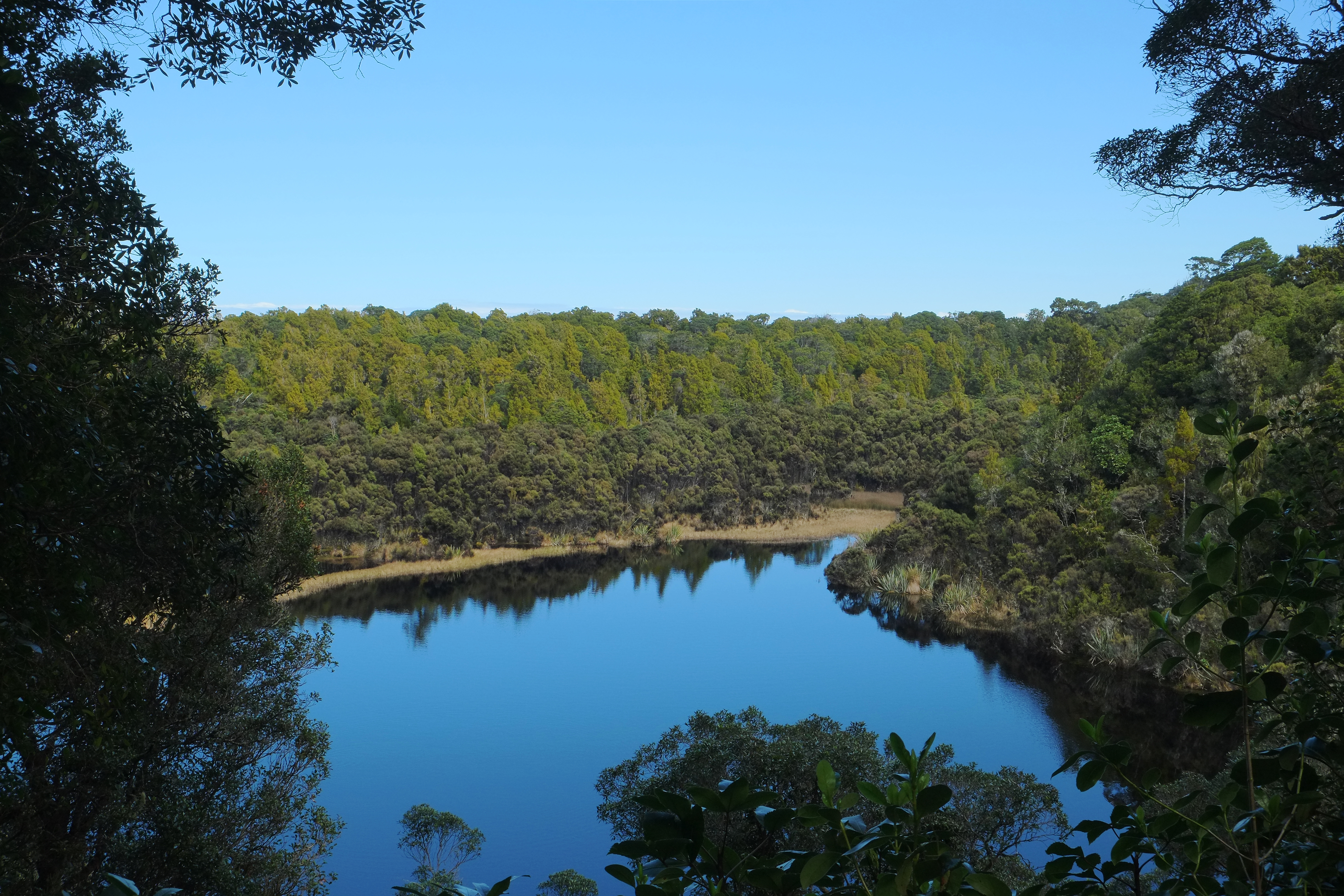
- View over Lake Wilkie

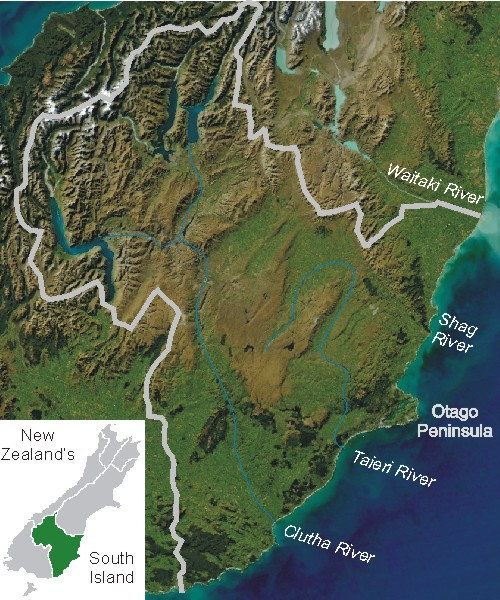
- Location within Otago peninsula
- Location: The Catlins, South Island
- Coordinates: 46.580309°S 169.438813°E
- Type: Bog lake
- Primary inflows: None
- Primary outflows: None
- Basin countries: New Zealand
- Surface area: 1.7 hectares (4.2 acres)
- Average depth: 1.5 metres (5 ft)
- Max. depth: 2 metres (7 ft)
- Surface elevation: 15 metres (49 ft)

Lake Wilkie is a small, scenic lake near Tautuku Bay in the Catlins, south of Dunedin, New Zealand. It formed after the last ice age and has gradually shrunk to its current size of 1.7 hectares (4.2 acres). Bog lakes like Lake Wilkie are a rare ecosystem in this part of the country.

== Formation ==
Lake Wilkie was formed after the most recent ice age about 13,000 years ago. Trapped towards the coast by a small cliff, water accumulated in a depression between ancient sand dunes. Originally, the lake was much larger and is slowly being filled in and reclaimed by the vegetation around it. Today, the lake is very shallow and its water coloured brownish by organic acids released by the peaty soils.

== Fauna and flora ==
The lake is home to only microscopic plankton and small invertebrates such as mites, molluscs, water boatman and worms. No fish have been found in the lake; although native galaxias are a possibility. The introduced whistling tree frog is common around the lake's edges. A cafe 7 kilometres (4 mi) along the road west from Lake Wilkie shares the same name of "The Whistling Frog Cafe & Bar".

Birds common in the forest around the lake include kererū, tūī, silvereye, fantail, bellbird, brown creeper and grey warbler. Fernbirds and ducks from the nearby Tautuku Estuary regularly visit Lake Wilkie.

The lake is only a short walk from a small car park on the Southern Scenic Route road, about 500 metres (0.3 mi) south of Tautuku Outdoor Education Centre. A walking track starts through mature podocarp forest, including rata and leads past a viewpoint over the lake and down to the lake. At the lake margin, a short loop track with a boardwalk section takes in the boggy wetland on the lake's edge. Along the track are several signs explaining the succession of different plants as land is slowly reclaimed. The full transition from marsh dominated by sphagnum moss and sedges to mature podocarp forest occurs in only 65 m (210 ft). This shows how waterside plants can slowly reclaim the land, and in turn be replaced by larger and larger vegetation types, culminating in the forest now covering the ancient dunes around the lake.
