= Southland Syncline =

Geological structure in New Zealand

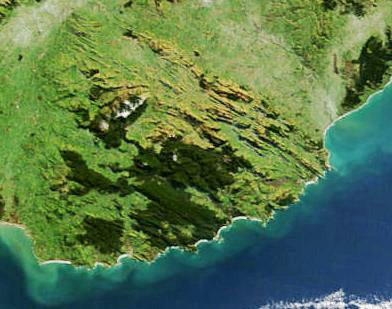
The parallel strike ridges of The Catlins, which form part of the syncline, can clearly be seen running from northwest to southeast in the upper part of this image.

The Southland Syncline is a major geological structure located in the Southland Region of New Zealand's South Island. The syncline folds the Mesozoic greywackes of the Murihiku Terrane. The northern limb of the fold is steep to overturned, while the southern limb dips shallowly to the northeast. The axial plan dips to the northeast and the axis plunges to the southeast.

The Murihiku Terrane is formed predominantly from Permian to Jurassic sedimentary rocks with minor igneous intrusions, and is marked by prominent strike ridges particularly on its northern limb due to the steeper dip. These are created from the erosion of alternating strata of sandstone and mudstone. The northern edge of this fold system is marked by the Murihiku Escarpment, at the southern extreme of the Waimea Plains. Many of the names of stages and epochs in the Permian, Triassic, and Jurassic periods in the New Zealand geologic time scale are named for places within or close to the Southland Syncline and Murihiku Terrane.

The ridges run northwest from the Pacific coast in the Catlins to the Takitimu Range, and includes the Hokonui Hills, which rise above the otherwise flat land of the Southland Plains (to the south) and Waimea Plains (to the north). The syncline dates from the Cretaceous, though the Hokonui Hills are caused by more recent uplift.

In the west, the syncline meets the country's largest fault system, the Alpine Fault. This fault is a transform fault for much of its length, and as such the westernmost part of the Southland Syncline is not found in the Southland Region, but continues several hundred kilometres to the north in the Nelson-Tasman area. The same fold is found as far north as the Auckland Region where it is called the Kaimango Syncline.

== See also ==
- List of rock formations of New Zealand
- Nugget Point
