= Papatowai =

Settlement in New Zealand

Coordinates: 46°36′S 169°28′E

Papatowai (Māori: Papatōwai) is a small settlement in the Catlins ward of the Clutha District of the southeastern South Island of New Zealand. The settlement is situated half-way between the cities of Dunedin and Invercargill, on the Pacific coast close to the mouth of the Tahakopa River. There is a permanent population of around 40 people, but with most of the houses in the town being holiday homes (locally known as "cribs") the population rises significantly during holiday seasons, particularly around New Year's Day and Easter.

The Ministry for Culture and Heritage gives a translation of "tōwai tree flat" for Papatōwai.

Papatowai is surrounded by native podocarp forest and there are numerous walks in the area to waterfalls, and sand beaches in addition to bushwalks. There is also a walk to an archaeological site where it is possible to see middens left by early Māori inhabitants of the area. In the past, the bones of moa have also been found here. In addition to its scenery, Papatowai is home to the Lost Gypsy Gallery, which attracts international visitors.

The Papatowai Challenge, a 15.5-kilometre (9.6 mi) bush and beach run and walk, has been held annually since 1998, usually on the first weekend in March. It attracts between 300 and 400 people each year. Peake’s Kitchen, a food truck at a local store, was the "supreme winner" in a nationwide hamburger competition in 2025.

Papatowai is also known for its big wave surfing.

== Climate ==
Climate data for Tautuku (3km SW of Papatowai, 1991–2020 normals, extremes 1976–present)
Month	Jan	Feb	Mar	Apr	May	Jun	Jul	Aug	Sep	Oct	Nov	Dec	Year
Record high °C (°F)	33.0 (91.4)	34.0 (93.2)	31.0 (87.8)	26.0 (78.8)	27.0 (80.6)	18.7 (65.7)	23.5 (74.3)	21.0 (69.8)	25.6 (78.1)	28.5 (83.3)	28.0 (82.4)	29.5 (85.1)	34.0 (93.2)
Mean maximum °C (°F)	27.5 (81.5)	27.1 (80.8)	25.2 (77.4)	22.1 (71.8)	19.5 (67.1)	15.6 (60.1)	15.3 (59.5)	17.2 (63.0)	20.3 (68.5)	22.8 (73.0)	24.3 (75.7)	26.4 (79.5)	29.3 (84.7)
Mean daily maximum °C (°F)	18.7 (65.7)	18.5 (65.3)	17.3 (63.1)	15.2 (59.4)	12.9 (55.2)	10.5 (50.9)	10.2 (50.4)	11.3 (52.3)	13.2 (55.8)	14.7 (58.5)	15.8 (60.4)	18.0 (64.4)	14.7 (58.4)
Daily mean °C (°F)	14.1 (57.4)	14.0 (57.2)	12.8 (55.0)	11.0 (51.8)	9.1 (48.4)	6.9 (44.4)	6.4 (43.5)	7.3 (45.1)	8.7 (47.7)	10.1 (50.2)	11.2 (52.2)	13.1 (55.6)	10.4 (50.7)
Mean daily minimum °C (°F)	9.5 (49.1)	9.5 (49.1)	8.3 (46.9)	6.8 (44.2)	5.2 (41.4)	3.4 (38.1)	2.6 (36.7)	3.3 (37.9)	4.2 (39.6)	5.4 (41.7)	6.7 (44.1)	8.3 (46.9)	6.1 (43.0)
Mean minimum °C (°F)	4.8 (40.6)	4.7 (40.5)	3.9 (39.0)	1.5 (34.7)	0.2 (32.4)	−1.3 (29.7)	−1.9 (28.6)	−1.1 (30.0)	−0.1 (31.8)	0.8 (33.4)	1.9 (35.4)	3.8 (38.8)	−2.6 (27.3)
Record low °C (°F)	2.5 (36.5)	3.0 (37.4)	1.5 (34.7)	−0.5 (31.1)	−5.0 (23.0)	−7.5 (18.5)	−4.3 (24.3)	−3.5 (25.7)	−3.0 (26.6)	−1.5 (29.3)	0.0 (32.0)	0.0 (32.0)	−7.5 (18.5)
Average rainfall mm (inches)	106.1 (4.18)	91.3 (3.59)	90.4 (3.56)	101.3 (3.99)	127.0 (5.00)	119.5 (4.70)	97.2 (3.83)	96.5 (3.80)	97.8 (3.85)	113.2 (4.46)	113.9 (4.48)	101.6 (4.00)	1,255.8 (49.44)
Source: NIWA
