= Nugget Point Lighthouse =

Lighthouse in New Zealand

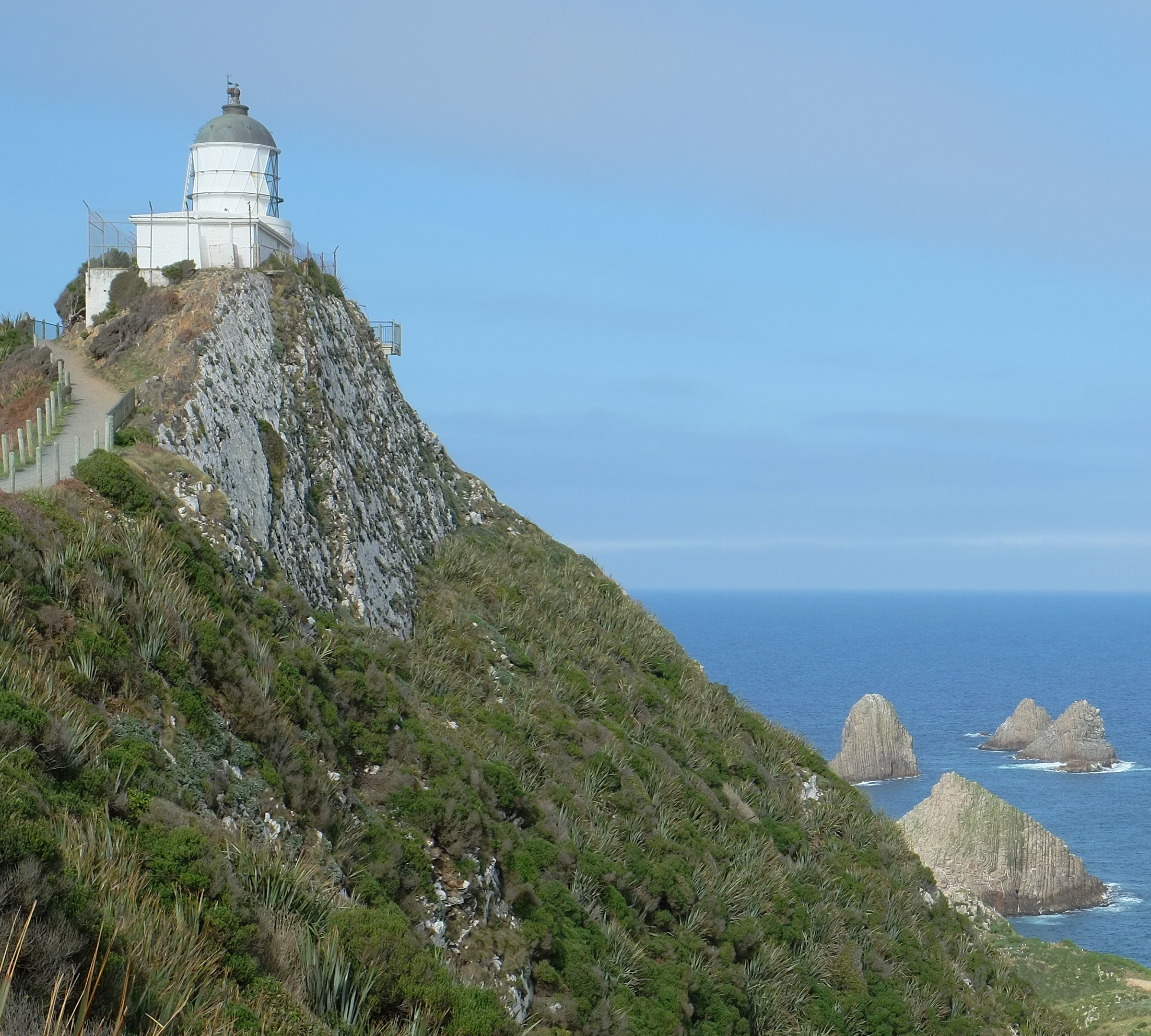
- Nugget Point lighthouse. Rocky islets (The Nuggets) can be seen beyond the point.
- Location: Nugget Point, South Island, New Zealand
- Coordinates: 46°26′53″S 169°49′01″E

Tower
- Constructed: 1870
- Construction: stone tower
- Automated: 1989
- Height: 9 metres (30 ft)
- Shape: cylindrical tower with balcony and lantern attached to one-story building
- Markings: white tower
- Power source: mains electricity

Light
- First lit: 1870
- Focal height: 76 metres (249 ft)
- Range: 10 nautical miles (19 km; 12 mi)
- Characteristic: LFL(2) W 12s.

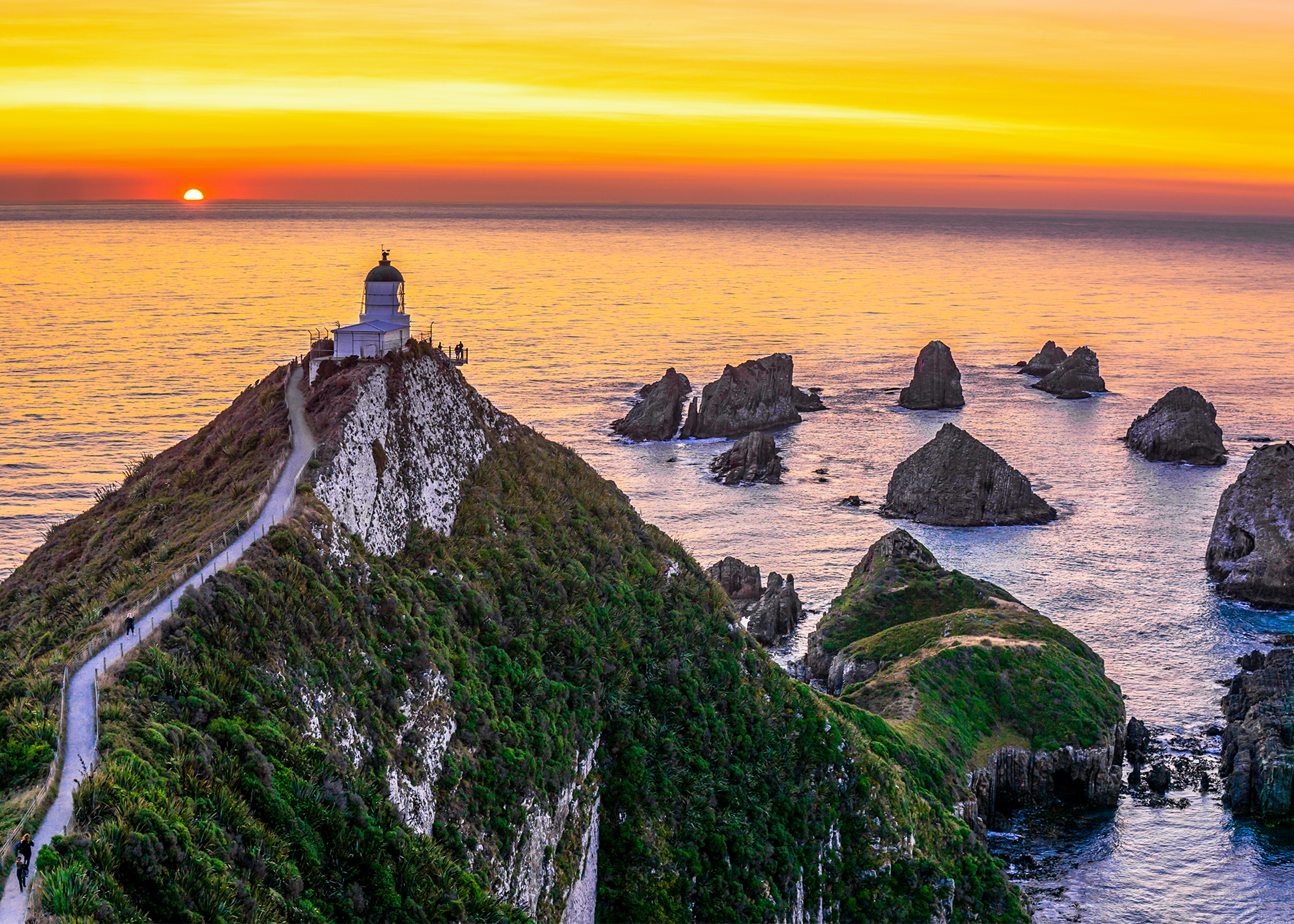
Nugget Point lighthouse at sunrise, in March 2019.

Nugget Point Lighthouse is a lighthouse at Nugget Point in the Otago region of the South Island of New Zealand. It is owned and operated by Maritime New Zealand.

== History ==
The lighthouse was built from 1869 to 1870 and first lit on 4 July 1870. The tower was constructed from locally quarried stone. The lighting apparatus that was installed had come to New Zealand on the same ship as the lighthouse designer James Balfour in 1863 and was originally intended for the lighthouse at Cape Saunders. With the project on Otago Peninsula experiencing many delays, the lighting apparatus was used at Nugget Point instead.

In 1901, Walter Hutton Champion was the lighthouse keeper along with his wife Alice.

Originally, the lighthouse was powered by an oil burner. In 1949, the oil lamp was replaced with an electric 1,000 W lamp powered by a local diesel generator. The generator was replaced in the 1960s by a connection to the mains grid, although the original lens for the light remained in place and continued to be used.

The light was fully automated in 1989 and is now monitored and managed from a Maritime New Zealand control room in Wellington. In 2006, the original light was replaced with an LED beacon, powered by mains and backed up by battery. The lighthouse was solarized in May 2020 and, now, has no mains power.

An easy 20-minute return walking track leads from the car park, at the end of The Nuggets Road, to a viewing platform right next to the lighthouse overlooking "The Nuggets". The lighthouse itself is fenced off.

== See also ==
- List of lighthouses in New Zealand
