= Waikawa River =

Coordinates: 46°39′S 169°09′E

Location
- Country: New Zealand

Physical characteristics
- Source
  - location: near Tokanui
- Mouth
  - location: Waikawa
- Length: 23 km (14 mi)

The Waikawa River flows east then south through the Catlins, an area of the southern South Island of New Zealand. Its total length is 23 kilometres (14 mi), and it flows into the Pacific Ocean at Waikawa. Close to its mouth, it cascades over a small series of cataracts, ironically named Niagara Falls.

The river's source is 15 kilometres (9 mi) east of Fortrose.

The New Zealand Ministry for Culture and Heritage gives a translation of "bitter water" for Waikawa.
