= Slope Point =

Southernmost point of New Zealand's South Island

- Point
- Location of Slope Point in New Zealand
- Coordinates: 46°40′31.39″S 169°00′20.34″E
- Location: Southland District, New Zealand
- Water bodies: Pacific Ocean

Slope Point is the southernmost point of the South Island of New Zealand.

Slope Point lies 24 kilometres (15 mi) south of the small settlement of Waikawa, near the southwestern edge of the Catlins and Toetoes Bay and 70 kilometres (43 mi) east of Invercargill. A nearby locality—Haldane—was named after the original European settlers, the Haldane family.

The land around Slope Point is used for sheep farming with no houses anywhere nearby. Eroded cliffs drop down to the sea below. An AA signpost there shows the distance to the Equator and the South Pole, and a small solar-powered lighthouse stands on farmland.

There is no road to Slope Point; it can be reached by a 20-minute walk following dilapidated yellow markers. Its latitude, longitude is approximately 46.67 S, 169.00 E. There is no public access during the lambing season (September – November).

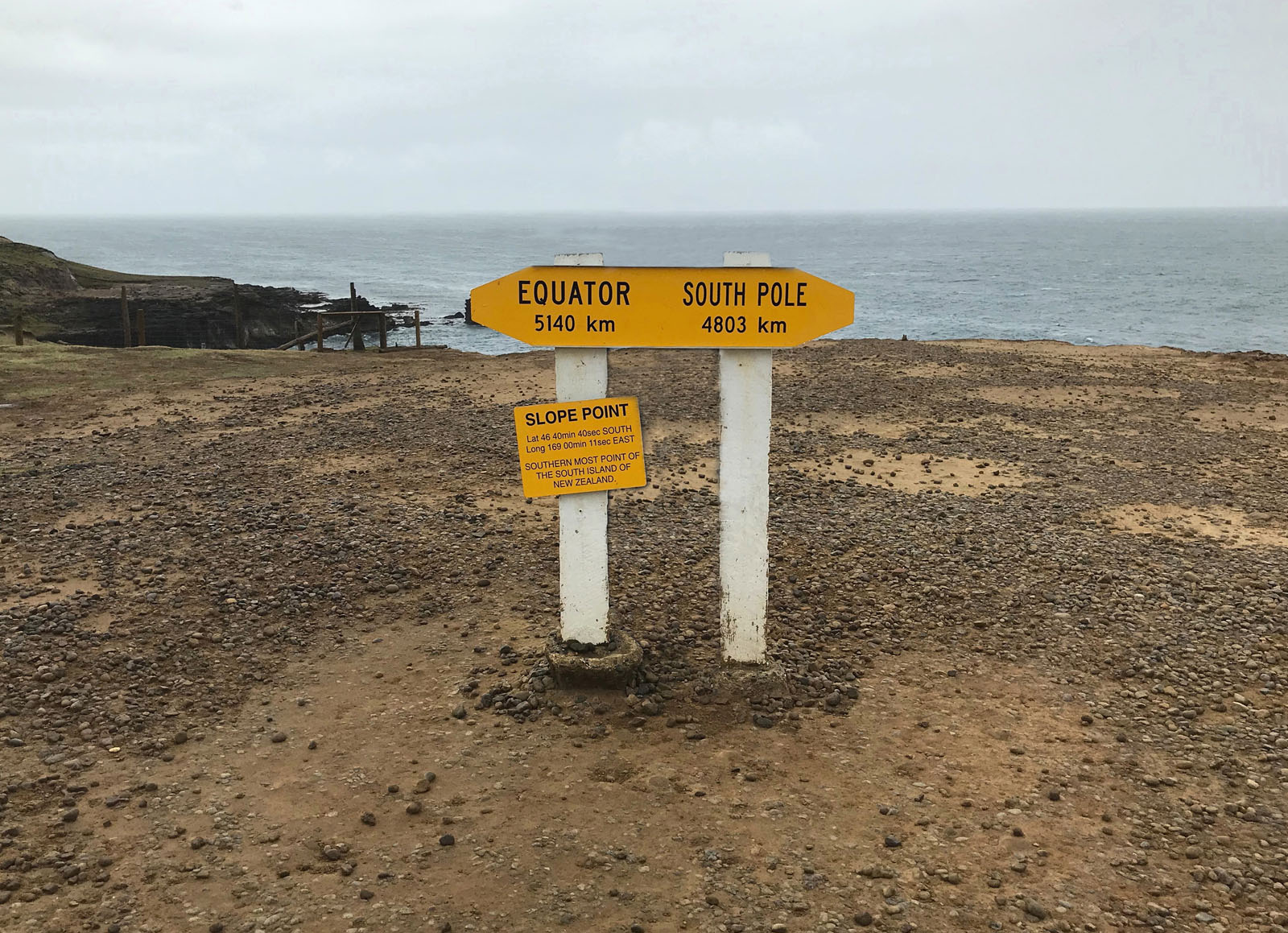
The AA signpost at Slope Point

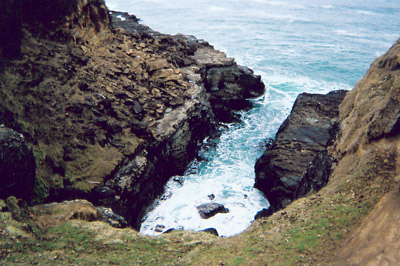
A view to the sea from the area around Slope Point

== See also ==
- Jacquemart Island
