= Mount Pye (New Zealand) =

Mountain in New Zealand

Coordinates: 46°25′S 169°17′E

Mount Pye is a rugged hill in the southeast of the South Island of New Zealand. It is the highest point in the area known as the Catlins, rising to 720 m (2361 ft). It is located 40 km (25 mi) southeast of Gore, and forms part of the border between the Otago and Southland regions. The headwaters of many of the Catlins' rivers are located on the slopes of Mount Pye.
