= Waikawa, Southland =

Coordinates: 46.627°S 169.134°E

Waikawa is a small settlement at the mouth of the Waikawa River in Southland, New Zealand, at the southwestern edge of The Catlins.

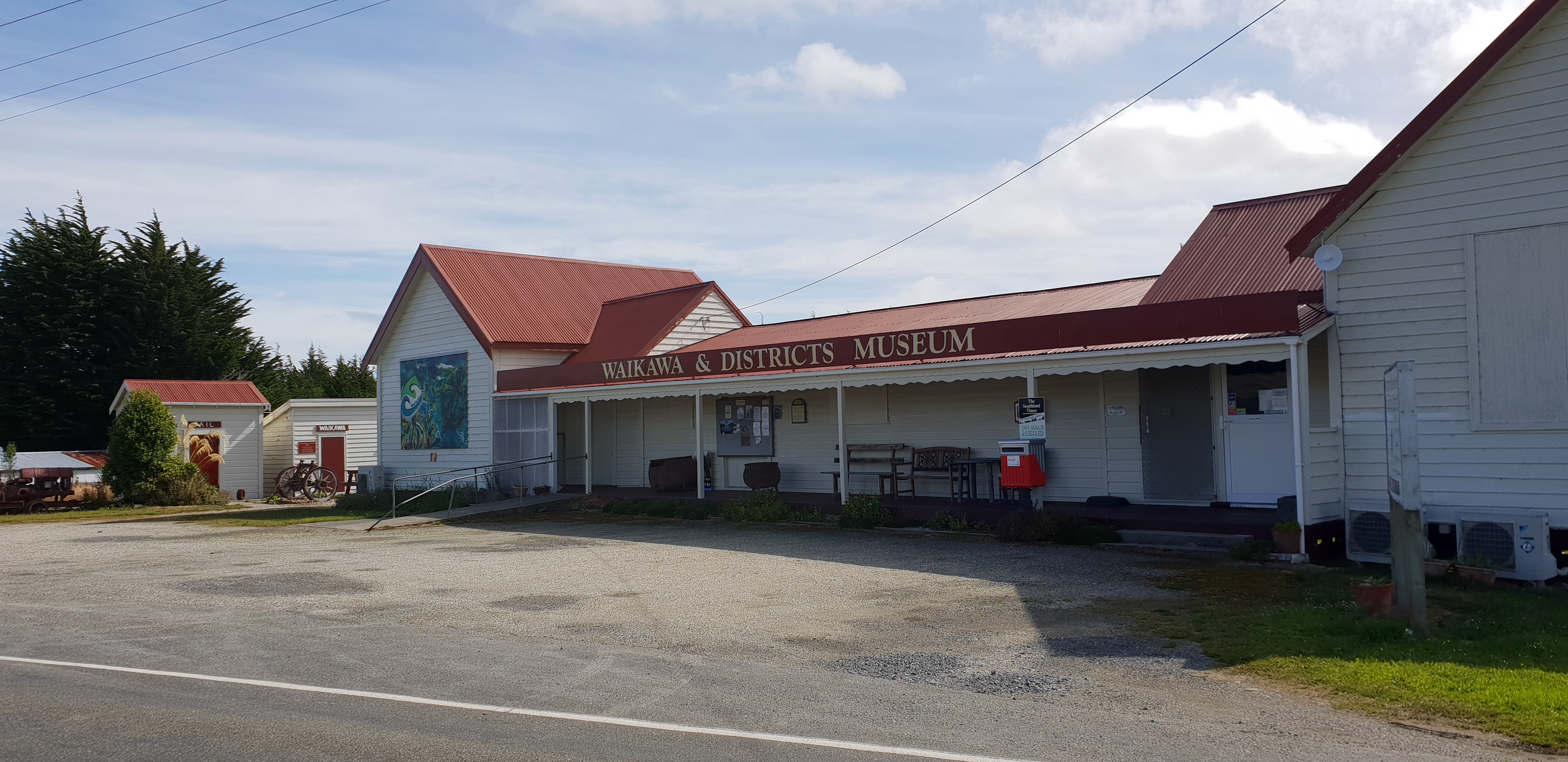
Waikawa and Districts Museum

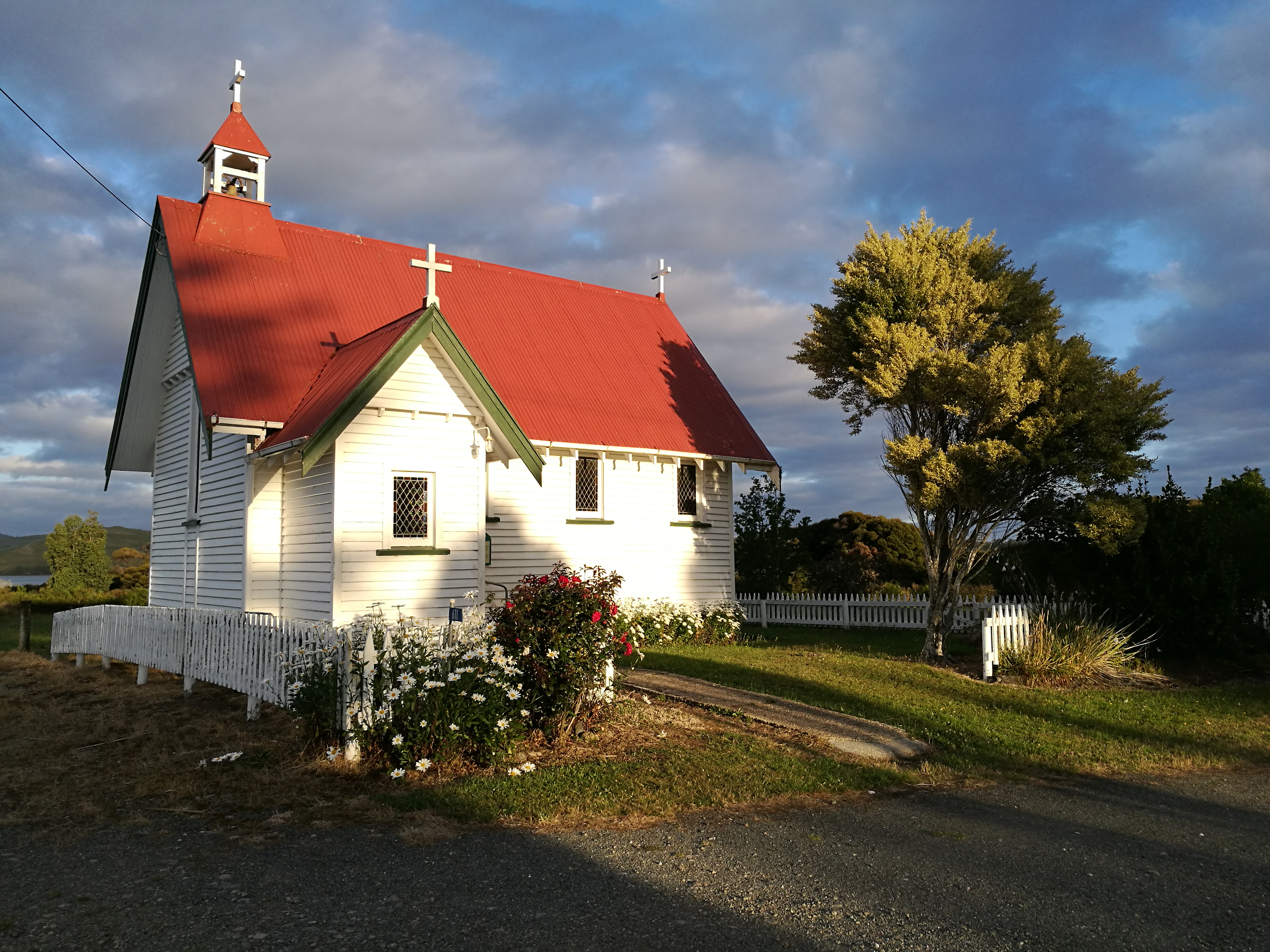
Former Waikawa Church (now part of Museum)

The township is now a small fishing settlement, but at one time in the late 19th century was a major port, shipping timber from the sawmills of the Catlins north to help build the new town of Dunedin. Originally a small Māori community, the first European settlers to the area set up sawmills in the late 1830s.

Unfortunately for Waikawa, the port facilities were prone to silting, and the nearby township of Fortrose became the more prominent port. It too fell prey to the arrival of the Tokanui Branch railway, and to a lesser extent the Catlins River Branch, in the late 1890s.

Today Waikawa hosts a museum, community centre, a popular fish and chip wagon and numerous accommodations and holiday homes because of its close proximity to Curio Bay and Porpoise Bay. Parts of Catlins Conservation Park are located nearby.

The Waikawa Museum and Information Centre was formed from two old school buildings, one from the former Waikawa School, and is run by volunteers also offering information to tourists who visit the area.

Most of the township faces the Waikawa estuary. This estuary is home to flounder, or flatfish, which can be fished out of the water by trawling nets.
