= Laemonema yarrellii =

Codling

Scientific classification
- Domain: Eukaryota
- Kingdom: Animalia
- Phylum: Chordata
- Class: Actinopterygii
- Order: Gadiformes
- Family: Moridae
- Genus: Laemonema
- Species: L. yarrelli

Binomial name
- Laemonema yarrelli Richard Thomas Lowe, 1838

Species of fish

Laemonema yarrellii, the codling, is a deep sea morid cod from Madeira and the Great Meteor Seamount of the North Atlantic. It was named for the English naturalist William Yarrell.
