= Guttigadus nudirostre =

Scientific classification
- Kingdom: Animalia
- Phylum: Chordata
- Class: Actinopterygii
- Order: Gadiformes
- Family: Moridae
- Genus: Guttigadus
- Species: G. nudirostre

Binomial name
- Guttigadus nudirostre (Trunov, 1990)

Synonyms
- Paralaemonema nudirostre Trunov, 1990; Guttigadus nudirostre (Trunov, 1990)

Species of fish

Guttigadus nudirostre is a species of morid cod in the family Moridae. It is found in the south-eastern Atlantic Ocean.

== Size ==
This species reaches a length of 22.6 cm (8.9 in).
