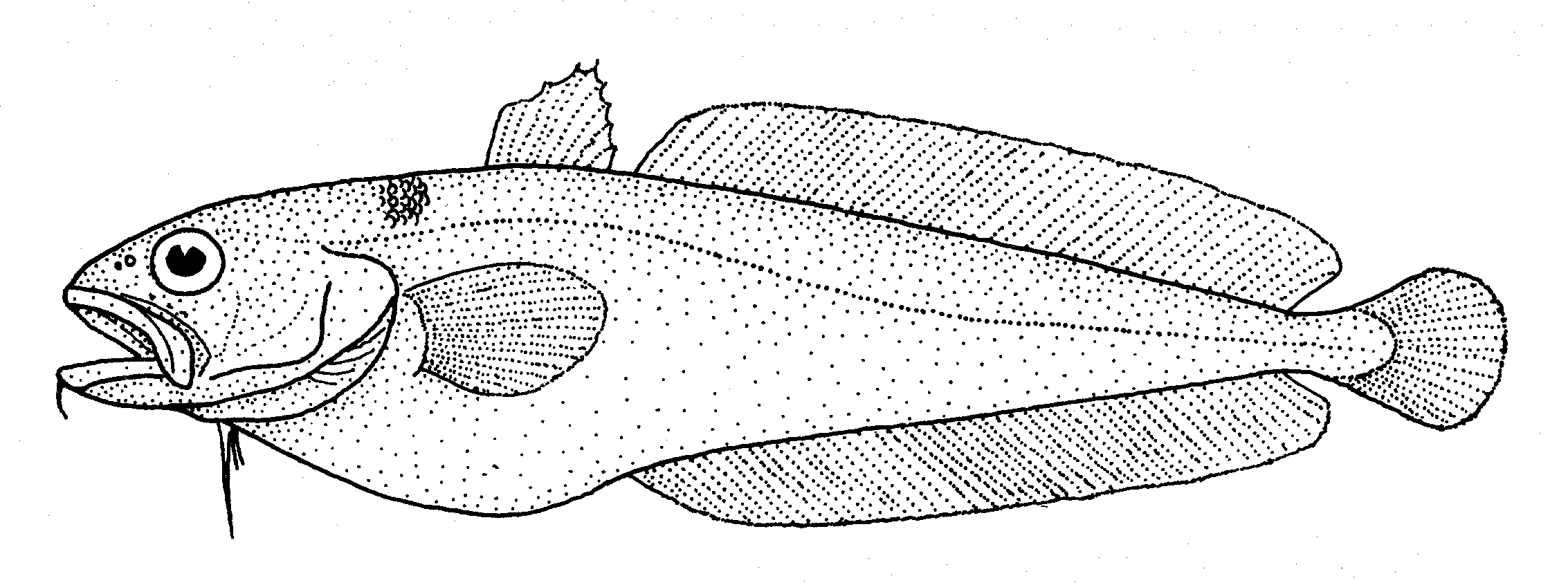
- Drawing by Dr Tony Ayling

Scientific classification
- Kingdom: Animalia
- Phylum: Chordata
- Class: Actinopterygii
- Order: Gadiformes
- Family: Moridae
- Genus: Pseudophycis
- Species: P. breviuscula

Binomial name
- Pseudophycis breviuscula (J. Richardson, 1846)

Synonyms
- Lota breviuscula Richardson, 1846

= Northern bastard codling =

Species of fish

The northern bastard codling (Pseudophycis breviuscula) is a morid cod of the genus Pseudophycis, found around southern Australia including Tasmania, and New Zealand, from the surface to 220 m. Its length is between 15 and 25 cm.

The northern bastard codling is similar in general appearance to the rattails, with large eyes and an elongated, tapering body, but the northern bastard codling has a separate, very rounded caudal fin. The second dorsal fin and the anal fin start about halfway along the body length.

Body colour is brown-pink with dark edges to the dorsal, caudal, and anal fins.

== Taxonomy ==
Pseudophycis breviuscula falls under the ray-finned fish class Actinopterygii. The order Gadiformes represents all cods (both marine, freshwater, and bracken) while the family Moridae is a collection of marine only cod-like fish. In the genus Pseudophycis (of which are only found in Southern Australia and/or New Zealand) there are two other species. Pseudophycis barbata (Southern bastard cod) and Pseudophycis bachus (red codling) complete this genus with P. breviuscula.

== Description ==
P. breviuscula is the smallest of the red cods with maximum size thought to be approximately 250mm. Other red cods can reach lengths up to 900mm. It was previously confused with P. barbata for some years. It can be identified as separate to P. bachus by the lack of presence of a dark spot near the bottom of the pectoral fin and displays larger scales than the southern bastard cod. It has two dorsal fins; the anterior being quite short while the posterior dorsal fin stretches more than half the body length. The caudal (tail) fin is rounded and not overly wide. The ventral aspect of the body is described as silver in color while the dorsal section is a pale pink-brownish color. The eyes are large and a barbel is present on the chin.

== Distribution and habitat ==
P. breviuscula is described as a ‘cryptic fish’ in that its behavior and habitat makes its difficult to study and accurately detect. Cryptic species are often seen to be endemic species. P. breviuscula is endemic New Zealand reef fish that occupies a temperate water climate. It is known to be nocturnal which is likely one of the reasons very little study has been done on it. The only New Zealand recordings of the northern bastard cod are in the North Island. It is more often recorded seen on the eastern coast than the western.

== Diet ==
While very little known is known about the northern bastard cod, a survey conducted on the inhabitants of the north-east coastal reef fish was performed providing some insight to the diet of P. breviuscula. The survey showed it to be a carnivorous benthic feeder of small crustaceans such as amphipods, shrimps, and crabs. This was done via examination of stomach contents. Feeding behavior could not be observed due to the nocturnal nature of this fish.
