= Guttigadus squamirostre =

Scientific classification
- Kingdom: Animalia
- Phylum: Chordata
- Class: Actinopterygii
- Order: Gadiformes
- Family: Moridae
- Genus: Guttigadus
- Species: G. squamirostre

Binomial name
- Guttigadus squamirostre (Trunov, 1990)

Synonyms
- Paralaemonema squamirostre Trunov, 1990; Guttigadus squamirostre (Trunov, 1990)

Species of fish

Guttigadus squamirostre, is a species of morid cod in the family Moridae. It is found in the south-eastern Atlantic Ocean off the south-western coast of Africa.

== Size ==
This species reaches a length of 16.1 cm (6.3 in).
