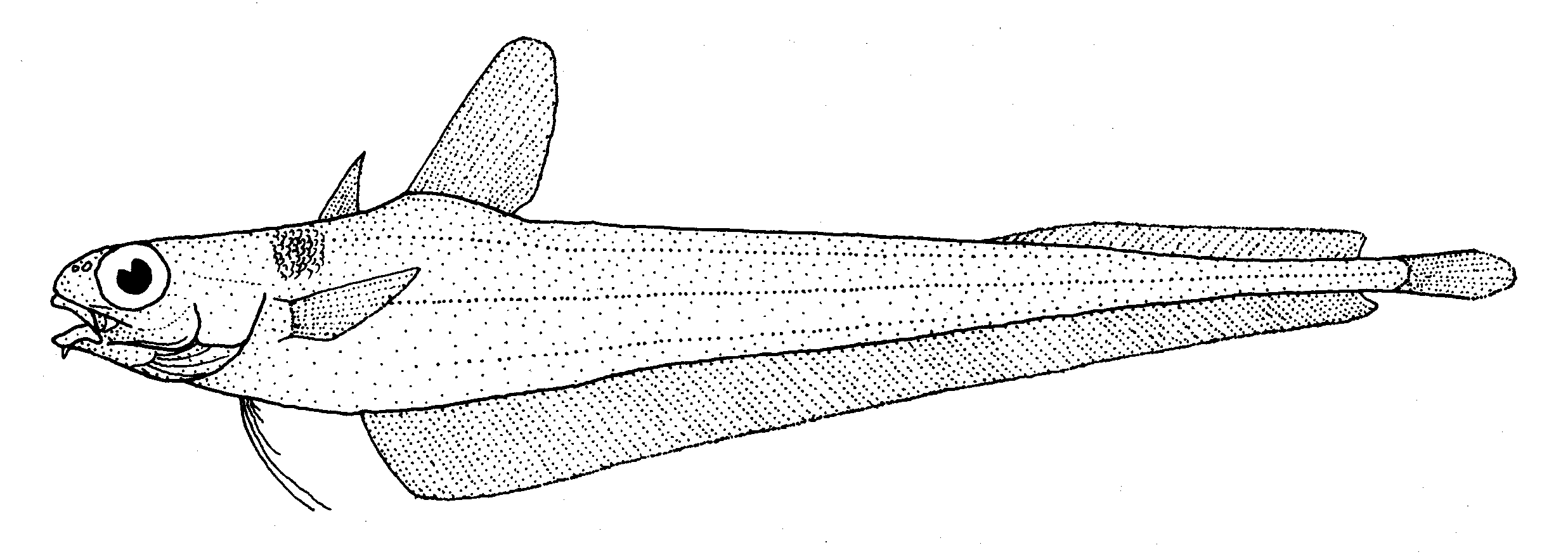
- Drawing by Dr Tony Ayling

Scientific classification
- Kingdom: Animalia
- Phylum: Chordata
- Class: Actinopterygii
- Order: Gadiformes
- Family: Moridae
- Genus: Tripterophycis
- Species: T. gilchristi

Binomial name
- Tripterophycis gilchristi Boulenger, 1902

= Grenadier cod =

Species of fish

The grenadier cod or chiseltooth grenadier cod, Tripterophycis gilchristi, is a morid cod of the genus Tripterophycis, found in the mid-south Atlantic Ocean, and around southern Australia, South Africa, Sumatra, and New Zealand. This species is found in marine environments on the continental slope.

The average length of an unsexed male is about 33 cm.

== Notes ==
- Froese, Rainer; Pauly, Daniel (eds.). "Tripterophycis gilchristi". FishBase. April 2006 version.
- Tony Ayling & Geoffrey Cox, Collins Guide to the Sea Fishes of New Zealand, (William Collins Publishers Ltd, Auckland, New Zealand 1982) ISBN 0-00-216987-8
