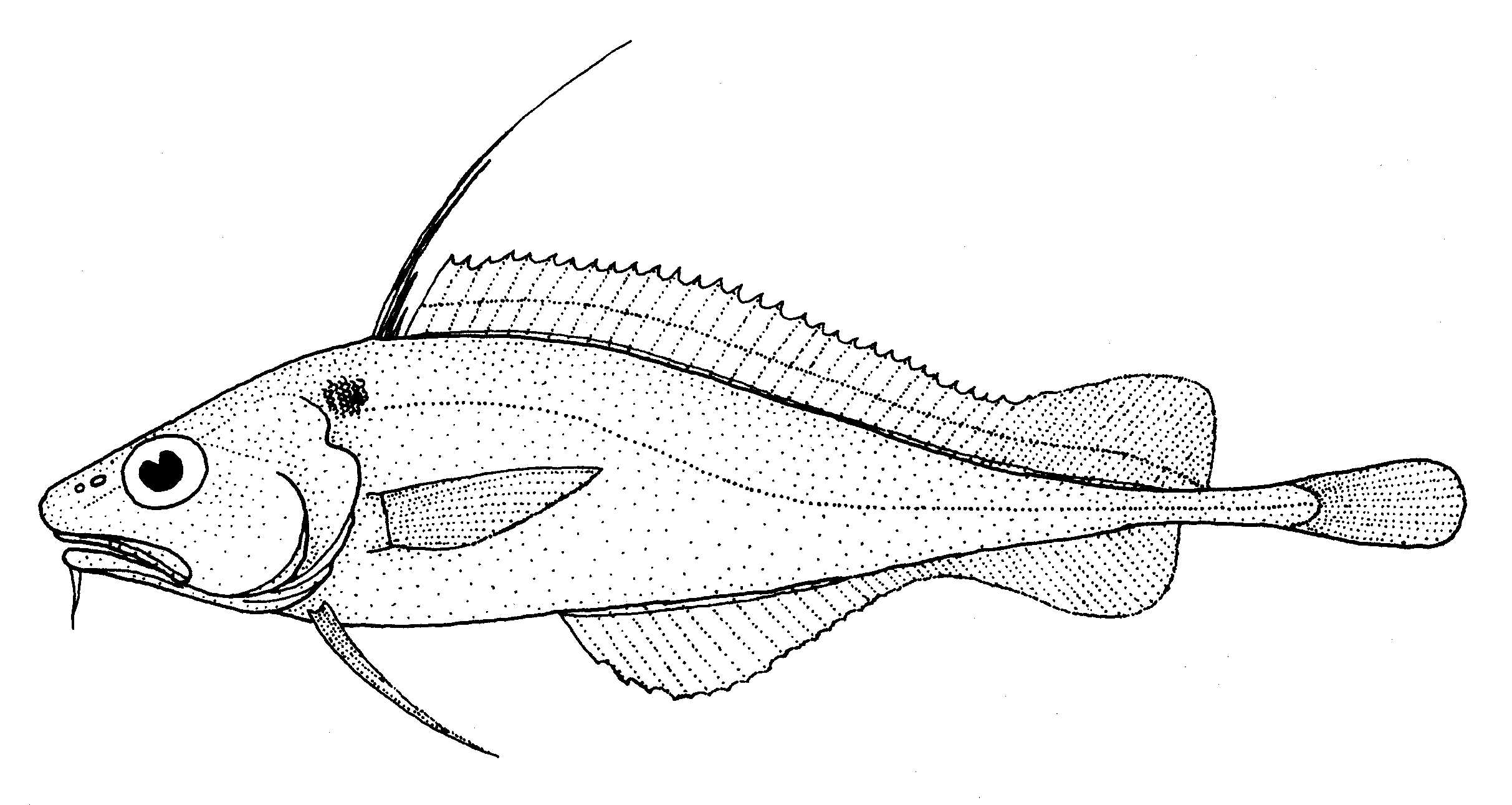
- Drawing by Tony Ayling

Scientific classification
- Domain: Eukaryota
- Kingdom: Animalia
- Phylum: Chordata
- Class: Actinopterygii
- Order: Gadiformes
- Family: Moridae
- Genus: Lepidion
- Species: L. microcephalus

Binomial name
- Lepidion microcephalus Cowper, 1956

= Small-headed cod =

Species of fish

The small-headed cod (Lepidion microcephalus) or the long-finned cod is a deepwater fish belonging to the morid cod family (Moridae), and related to the true cods (genus Gadus). It is found in the Tasman Sea, including the Bass Strait. It is commercially harvested by both Australia and New Zealand. It has been found on the continental shelf, but typically its depth range is from 750 to 1,000 m (2,460 to 3,280 ft). It grows to 48 centimetres (19 in) in total length.

The second common name is because its first dorsal fin is made up of long, filamentous rays. The pelvic fin is long, thin, and scythe-like, and it has a pronounced chin barbel.

The colour is grey-brown with a faint red tint on the body and black-edged median fins.
