= Guttigadus latifrons =

Conservation status
- Least Concern (IUCN 3.1)

Scientific classification
- Kingdom: Animalia
- Phylum: Chordata
- Class: Actinopterygii
- Order: Gadiformes
- Family: Moridae
- Genus: Guttigadus
- Species: G. latifrons

Binomial name
- Guttigadus latifrons (Holt & Byrne, 1908)

Synonyms
- Laemonema latifrons Holt & Byrne, 1908

Species of fish

Guttigadus latifrons, is a species of morid cod in the family Moridae. It is found worldwide.

== Size ==
This species reaches a length of 18.2 cm (7.2 in).
