= Guttigadus globiceps =

Scientific classification
- Kingdom: Animalia
- Phylum: Chordata
- Class: Actinopterygii
- Order: Gadiformes
- Family: Moridae
- Genus: Guttigadus
- Species: G. globiceps

Binomial name
- Guttigadus globiceps (Gilchrist, 1906)

Synonyms
- Laemonema globiceps Gilchrist, 1906; Laemonema multiradiatum Thompson, 1916

Species of fish

Guttigadus globiceps, also known as fat-headed cod, is a species of cod in the family Moridae, the morid cods. It is found worldwide.

== Size ==
This species reaches a length of 14.0 cm (5.5 in).
