= Guttigadus kongi =

Scientific classification
- Kingdom: Animalia
- Phylum: Chordata
- Class: Actinopterygii
- Order: Gadiformes
- Family: Moridae
- Genus: Guttigadus
- Species: G. kongi

Binomial name
- Guttigadus kongi (Markle & Meléndez C., 1988)

Synonyms
- Laemonema kongi Markle & Meléndez C., 1988

Species of fish

Guttigadus kongi, the Austral cod, is a species of morid cod in the family Moridae. It is found in the south-eastern Atlantic Ocean off the southwestern coast of Africa.

== Size ==
This species reaches a length of 15.3 cm (6.0 in).

== Etymology ==
The fish is named in honor of ichthyologist Ismael Kong Urbina (1942-2008), of the University of Antofagasta in Chile, who was the collector of the type material.
