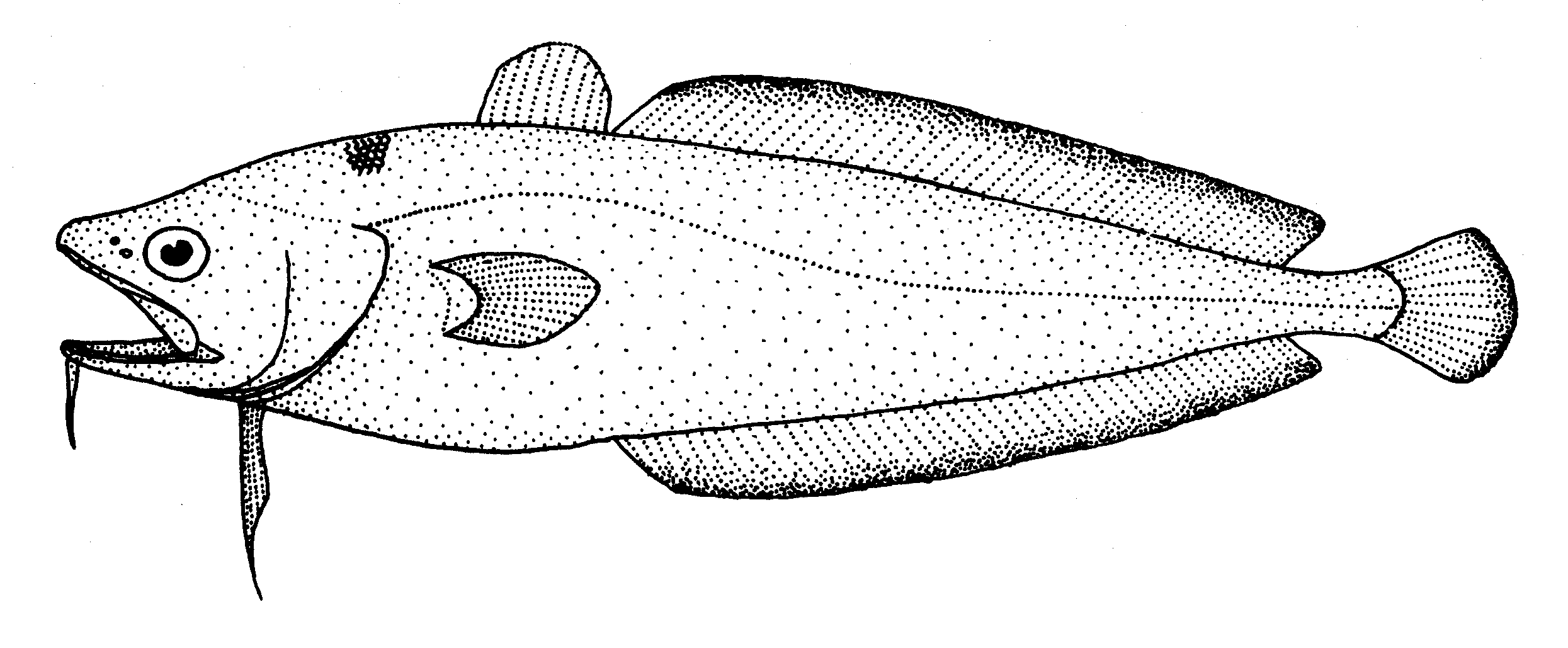
- Drawing by Dr Tony Ayling

Scientific classification
- Domain: Eukaryota
- Kingdom: Animalia
- Phylum: Chordata
- Class: Actinopterygii
- Order: Gadiformes
- Family: Moridae
- Genus: Pseudophycis
- Species: P. barbata

Binomial name
- Pseudophycis barbata Günther, 1863

Synonyms
- Physiculus barbatus (Günther, 1863); Lotella grandis Ramsay, 1881

= Southern bastard codling =

Species of fish

The southern bastard codling or bearded red cod (Pseudophycis barbata) is a morid cod of the genus Pseudophycis, found around southern Australia including Tasmania, and New Zealand, from the surface to 300 m. Its length is up to 63 cm.
