= Guttigadus globosus =

Tadpole cod

Scientific classification
- Kingdom: Animalia
- Phylum: Chordata
- Class: Actinopterygii
- Order: Gadiformes
- Family: Moridae
- Genus: Guttigadus
- Species: G. globosus

Binomial name
- Guttigadus globosus (Paulin, 1986)

Synonyms
- Momonatira globosus Paulin, 1986; Momonatira paulini Trunov, 1989

Species of fish

Guttigadus globosus, the tadpole cod, is a deepwater fish found in the oceanic islands off New Zealand and in the mid South Atlantic at depths ranging from 1200 to 1600 m.

The tadpole cod is a member of the family Moridae, the morid cods, related to the true cods (of genus Gadus, family Gadidae). Like the familiar Atlantic cod, it has small whiskers (barbels) on its mouth.

== Size ==
This species reaches a length of 18.1 cm (7.1 in).

It has no commercial value, and is not currently believed to be endangered. Not much is known about this species, being discovered in 1986.

The tadpole cod is distinct from the tadpole fish, Raniceps raninus. This fish was formerly classified in the family Ranicipitidae, called the tadpole cods, as its sole member. The family was placed in a different order of fish, the Ophidiiformes (cusk-eels and brotulas). However, it is now regarded as a member of the same family as cods, Gadidae.
