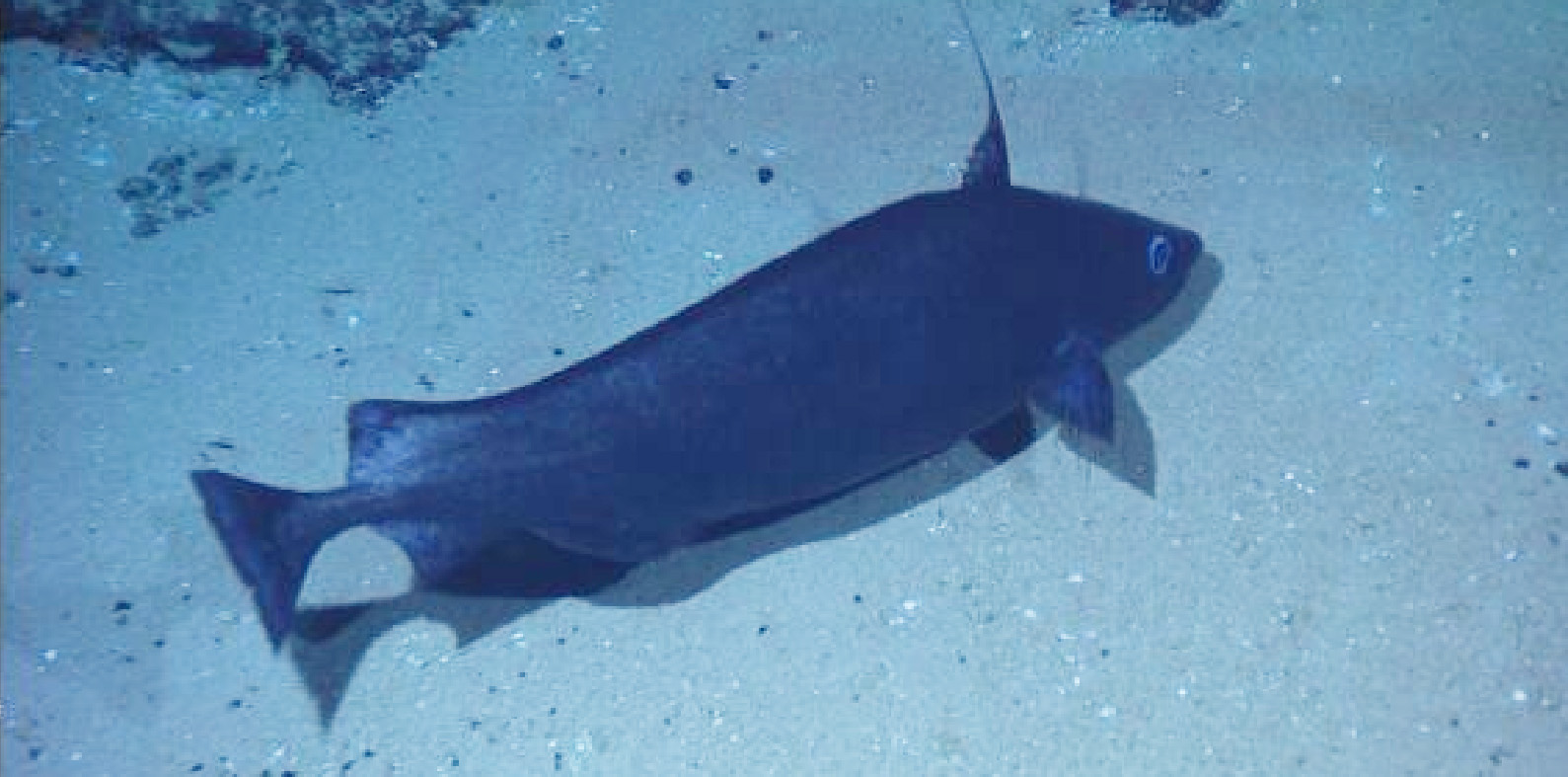

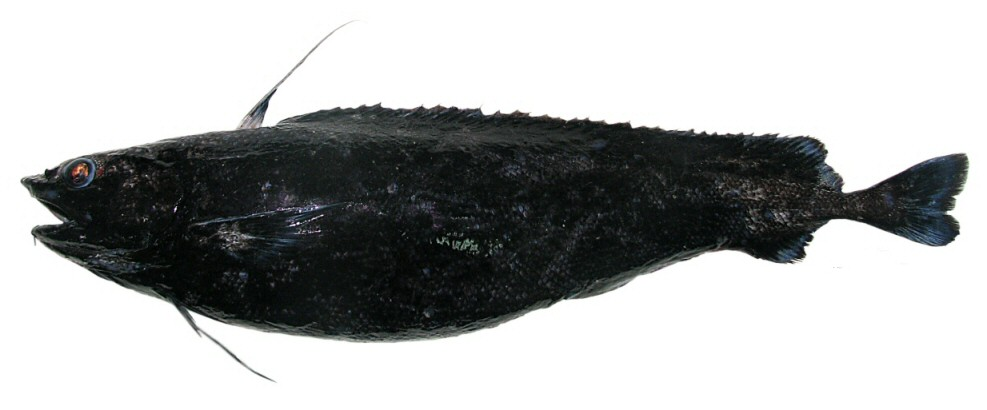

Conservation status
- Least Concern (IUCN 3.1)

Scientific classification
- Kingdom: Animalia
- Phylum: Chordata
- Class: Actinopterygii
- Order: Gadiformes
- Family: Moridae
- Genus: Antimora
- Species: A. rostrata

Binomial name
- Antimora rostrata (Günther, 1878)

= Blue antimora =

Species of fish

The blue antimora (Antimora rostrata), also known as the flat-nose codling, blue hake, long-finned cod or violet cod, is a benthopelagic species of morid cod of the genus Antimora, found in seas around the world on the continental shelf except the north Pacific. This bluish-black species may be found at depths of between 350 and 3,000 m(1,148 to 9.843 ft), but it is commonly found at depths of 800-1800m. Its length is between 40 and 75 cm (15.7 to 29.5 inches). It is of minor importance to commercial fisheries.
