= Guttigadus =

Scientific classification
- Domain: Eukaryota
- Kingdom: Animalia
- Phylum: Chordata
- Class: Actinopterygii
- Order: Gadiformes
- Family: Moridae
- Genus: Guttigadus; Iw. Taki, 1953

Synonyms
- Momonatira Paulin, 1986; Paralaemonema Trunov, 1990

Genus of fishes

Guttigadus is a genus of morid cods. This genus is sometimes considered a subgenus of Laemonema and Laemonema nana as Guttigadus nana is named as the type species of the genus Guttigadus, although FishBase does not include this species in the list of species in Guttigadus.

== Species ==
The currently recognized species in this genus are:

- Guttigadus globiceps (Gilchrist, 1906) (fat-headed cod)
- Guttigadus globosus (Paulin, 1986) (tadpole cod)
- Guttigadus kongi (Markle & Meléndez C., 1988) (austral cod)
- Guttigadus latifrons (Holt & Byrne, 1908)
- Guttigadus nudicephalus (Trunov, 1990)
- Guttigadus nudirostre (Trunov, 1990)
- Guttigadus squamirostre (Trunov, 1990)
