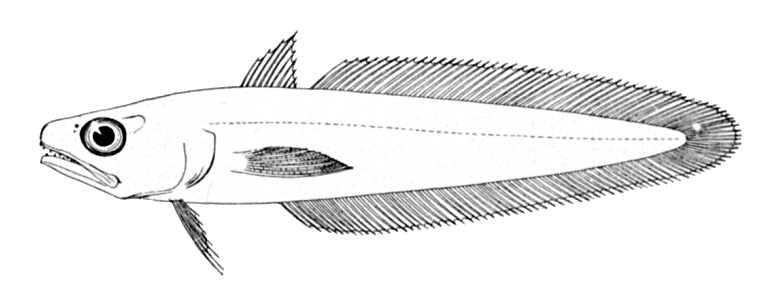

Conservation status
- Least Concern (IUCN 3.1)

Scientific classification
- Kingdom: Animalia
- Phylum: Chordata
- Class: Actinopterygii
- Order: Gadiformes
- Family: Moridae
- Genus: Gadella
- Species: G. maraldi

Binomial name
- Gadella maraldi (Risso, 1810)

Synonyms
- Gadus maraldi Risso, 1810; Merluccius ambiguous Lowe, 1841; Merluccius ambiguus Lowe, 1841; Merluccius maraldi (Risso, 1810); Merluccius uraleptus Costa, 1846; Strinsia tinca Rafinesque, 1810; Uraleptus maraldi (Risso, 1810)

= Gadella maraldi =

Species of fish

Gadella maraldi, the gadella or morid cod, is a species of fish in the family Moridae from the warmer waters of the north eastern Atlantic Ocean and the Mediterranean Sea.

== Description ==
Gadella maraldi grow to a maximum length of 30 centimetres (12 in). Its upper jaw has two rows of teeth, the outer row is made up of small teeth interspersed with notably large ones; the inner one only has small teeth. The anal fin originates on the anterior third of body, under the origin of anterior dorsal fin while the pectoral fins reach well past the origin of the anal fin. The filamentous ray of the pelvic fins extends slightly beyond the anal fin origin. It is generally dark in colour with a pale mouth cavity.

== Distribution ==
Gadella maraldi is found in the warmer waters of the north eastern Atlantic from the southern Atlantic coast of Portugal south to west Africa, its southern limit in Africa being uncertain. Its Atlantic range includes the Canary Islands, Madeira and the Azores, as well as the Grand Meteor Bank. In the Mediterranean Sea it occurs from the coast of Spain and the Balearics to the Aegean Sea and Levantine Sea. It has been recorded as far north as Galicia and three specimens were taken from the Porcupine Bank off Ireland in the 21st Century.

== Habitat and ecology ==
Gadella maraldi is a benthopelagic fish which can be found on the upper continental slope, over hard substrates at depths ranging from 150 to 700 m, to 368–748m in the east Ionian Sea. Spawning most likely takes place in the Spring and it has pelagic larvae. Its diet is not known. It attains sexual maturity at a length of 15 cm.

== Fisheries ==
It is taken as a bycatch and occasionally recorded in markets but it is not a commercially significant species.

== Naming ==
The specific name maraldi honours the French-Italian astronomer and mathematician Giacomo F. Maraldi (1665-1729), who was also known as Jacques Maraldi.
