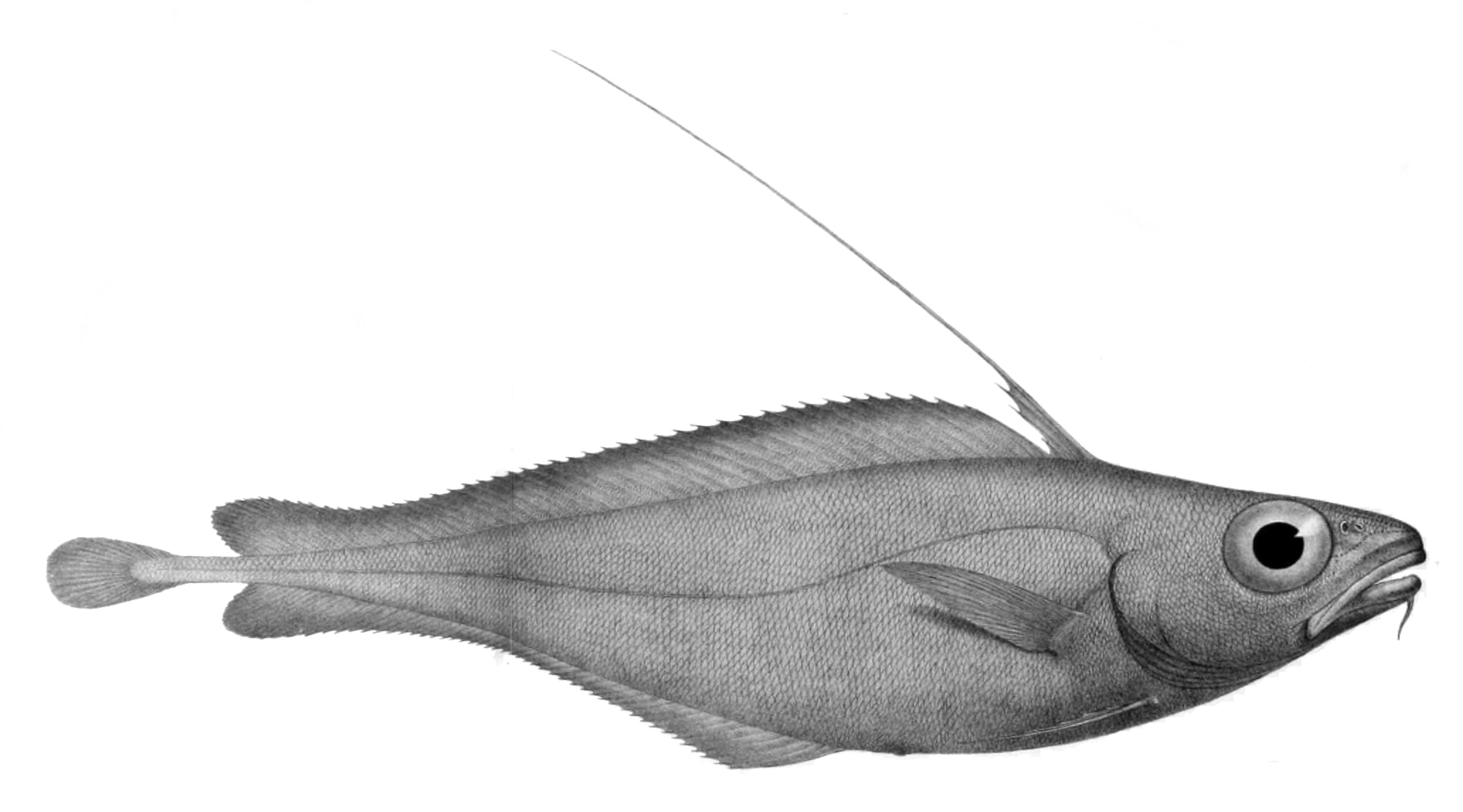
- Illustration from Report on the deep-sea fishes collected by H.M.S. Challenger during the years 1873–1876

Conservation status
- Data Deficient (IUCN 3.1)

Scientific classification
- Kingdom: Animalia
- Phylum: Chordata
- Class: Actinopterygii
- Division: Teleostei
- Order: Gadiformes
- Family: Moridae
- Genus: Lepidion
- Species: L. eques

Binomial name
- Lepidion eques (Günther, 1887)

Synonyms
- Haloporphyrus eques Günther, 1887

= North Atlantic codling =

Species of fish

The morid cod, largeye lepidion, or North Atlantic codling (Lepidion eques) is a species of fish in the family Moridae. The Catalog of Fishes considers it a synonym of Lepidion lepidion.

== Name ==
The specific name eques means "knight", referring to the plume-like protuberance on its head; this is also reflected in the Icelandic name bláriddari and Danish name blå ridder, both meaning "blue knight."

== Description ==
Illustration of L. eques by Viggo Winkel and Peter Magnussen

The North Atlantic codling is pink-brown in colour with a blue tinge; albinos are common. It is up to 44 cm (1.44 ft) in length. Its posterior nostril is immediately anterior to the eye. There are 55–60 dorsal finrays and 50–54 anal finrays. It has a lateral line with pit organs but no pores, and 8–13 pyloric caeca.

== Habitat ==
The North Atlantic codling lives in the North Atlantic Ocean; it is benthopelagic, living at depths of 120–1,900 m (390–6,230 ft).

== Behaviour ==
The North Atlantic codling feeds on crustaceans and polychaetes. It usually swims close to sandy bottoms and exhibits station holding behavior.
