= Guttigadus nudicephalus =

Scientific classification
- Kingdom: Animalia
- Phylum: Chordata
- Class: Actinopterygii
- Order: Gadiformes
- Family: Moridae
- Genus: Guttigadus
- Species: G. nudicephalus

Binomial name
- Guttigadus nudicephalus (Trunov, 1990)

Synonyms
- Paralaemonema nudicephalum Trunov, 1990; Guttigadus nudicephalum (Trunov, 1990)

Species of fish

Guttigadus nudicephalus, is a species of morid cod in the family Moridae. It is found in the south-eastern Atlantic Ocean.

== Size ==
This species reaches a length of 14.7 cm (5.8 in).
