= John Henry Johnson (disambiguation) =

John Henry Johnson may refer to:

- John Henry Johnson (1929–2011), NFL running back
- John Henry Johnson (baseball), (born 1956)
- John Henry Johnson (patent attorney), (1828–1900), British

== See also ==
- John Johnson (disambiguation)
