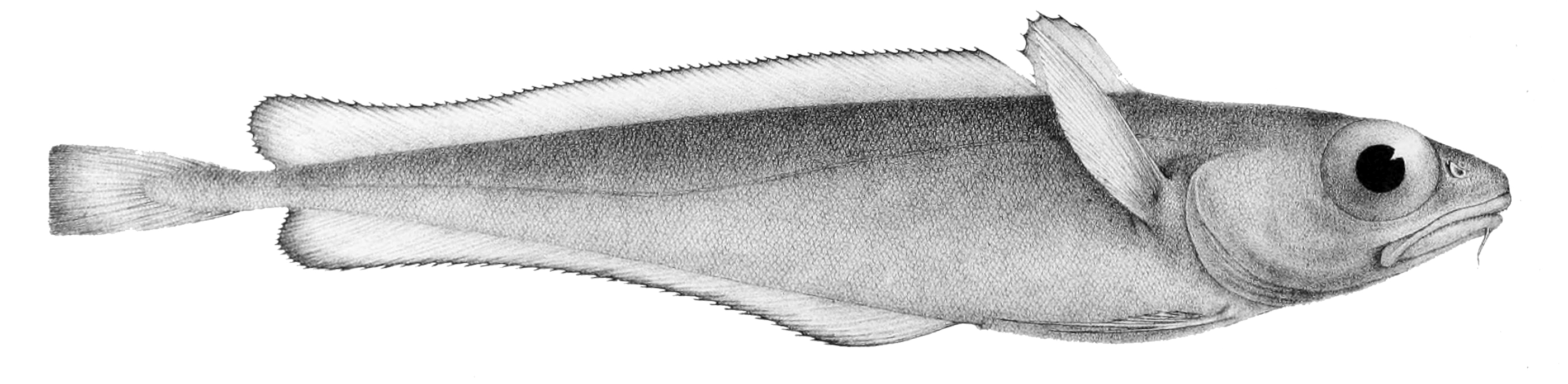

Scientific classification
- Domain: Eukaryota
- Kingdom: Animalia
- Phylum: Chordata
- Class: Actinopterygii
- Order: Gadiformes
- Family: Moridae
- Genus: Notophycis
- Species: N. marginata

Binomial name
- Notophycis marginata (Günther, 1878)

Synonyms
- Lotella marginata Günther, 1878; Austrophycis marginata (Günther, 1878); Physiculus marginatus (Günther, 1878); Austrophycis megalops Ogilby, 1897

= Dwarf codling =

Species of fish

The dwarf codling (Notophycis marginata), is a species of morid cod found on the continental slopes in the southeast Pacific and the southwest Atlantic, where it is found down to 1,200 m (3,900 ft). This species grows to 24 cm (9.4 in) in total length.
