= Rhynchogadus =

Conservation status
- Data Deficient (IUCN 3.1)

Scientific classification
- Kingdom: Animalia
- Phylum: Chordata
- Class: Actinopterygii
- Division: Teleostei
- Order: Gadiformes
- Family: Moridae
- Genus: Rhynchogadus; Tortonese, 1948
- Species: R. hepaticus

Binomial name
- Rhynchogadus hepaticus (Facciolà, 1884)

Synonyms
- Hypsirhynchus hepaticus Facciolà, 1884; Sympodoichthys fasciatus Facciolà, 1888

Species of fish

Rhynchogadus hepaticus is a species of morid cod known only from the Mediterranean Sea where it occurs in the Gulf of Naples and near to Messina. This fish is found at depths from 400 to 700 m (1,310 to 2,300 ft). This species grows to 10 cm (3.9 in) in standard length.
