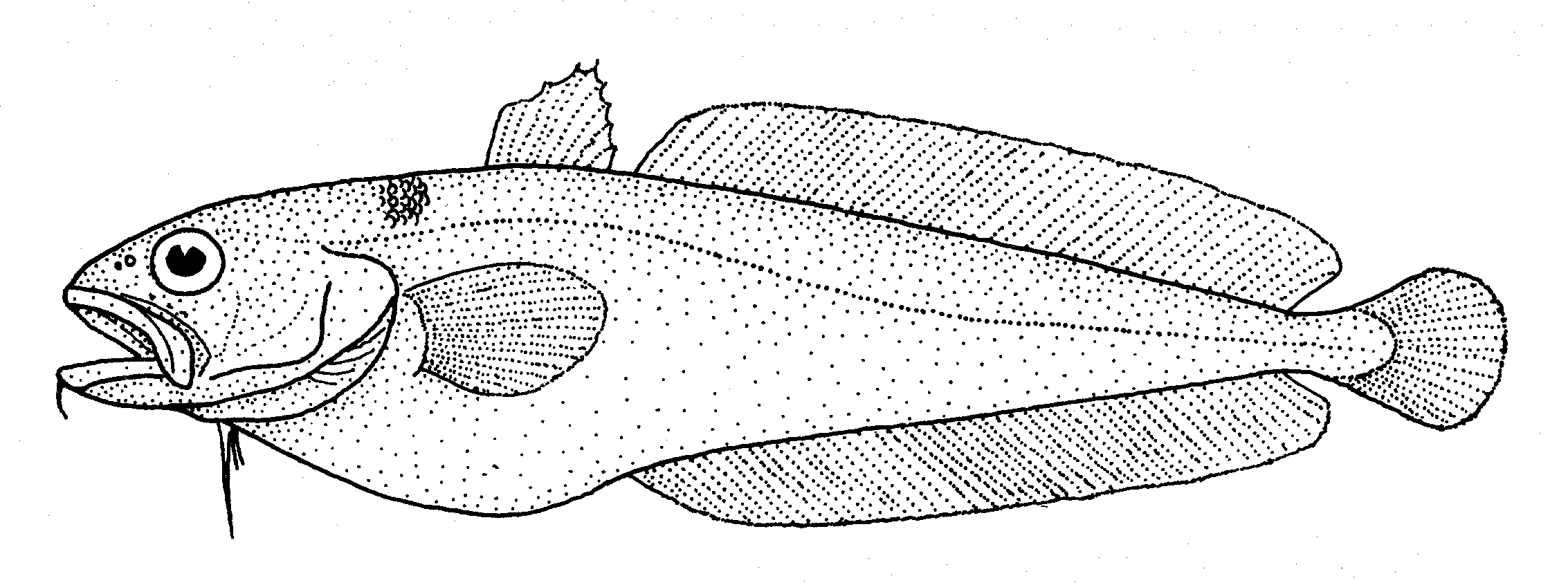
- A northern bastard codling

Scientific classification
- Kingdom: Animalia
- Phylum: Chordata
- Class: Actinopterygii
- Order: Gadiformes
- Family: Moridae
- Genus: Pseudophycis; Günther, 1862

Type species
- Lota breviuscula Richardson, 1846

Synonyms
- Austrophycis Ogilby, 1897

= Pseudophycis =

Genus of fishes

Pseudophycis is a genus of codlings of the family Moridae found around New Zealand and Southern Australia.

== Species ==
The currently recognized species in this genus are:

- Pseudophycis bachus (J. R. Forster, 1801) (red codling)
- Pseudophycis barbata Günther, 1863 (southern bastard codling)
- Pseudophycis breviuscula (J. Richardson, 1846) (northern bastard codling)
