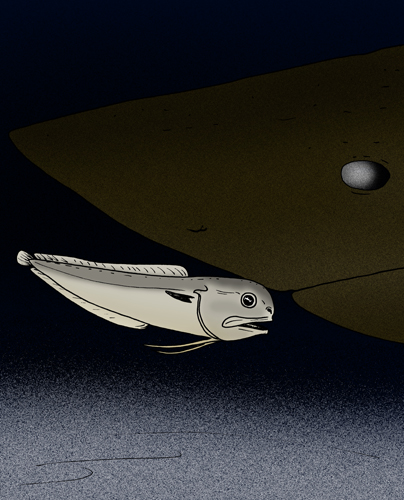
- Restoration of E. jamnesis

Scientific classification
- Domain: Eukaryota
- Kingdom: Animalia
- Phylum: Chordata
- Class: Actinopterygii
- Order: Gadiformes
- Family: Moridae
- Genus: †Eophycis; Jerzmanska, 1968

Type species
- Eophycis jamnensis Jerzmanska, 1968

Species
- E. froidefontainensis Pharisat, 1991; E. jamnensis Jerzmańska, 1968; E. pshekhiensis Rozenberg & Prokofiev, 2004

= Eophycis =

Eophycis Temporal range: Early Oligocene

Extinct genus of fishes

Eophycis ("dawn Phycis") is an extinct genus of prehistoric morid gadiform fish that lived during the early Oligocene epoch in the Paratethys Sea, where it is known from both the eastern and western regions. It represents the oldest fossil record of the Moridae.

It contains three species:

- E. froidefontainensis Pharisat, 1991 - Early Oligocene of France (Froidefontaine Formation)
- E. jamnensis Jerzmańska, 1968 (type species) - Early Oligocene of Poland (Menilitic Formation)
- E. pshekhiensis Rozenberg & Prokofiev, 2004 - Early Oligocene of North Caucasus, Russia (Pshekha Formation)

Several articulated, well-preserved specimens of E. jamnensis are known from Poland.

== See also ==
- Prehistoric fish
- List of prehistoric bony fish
