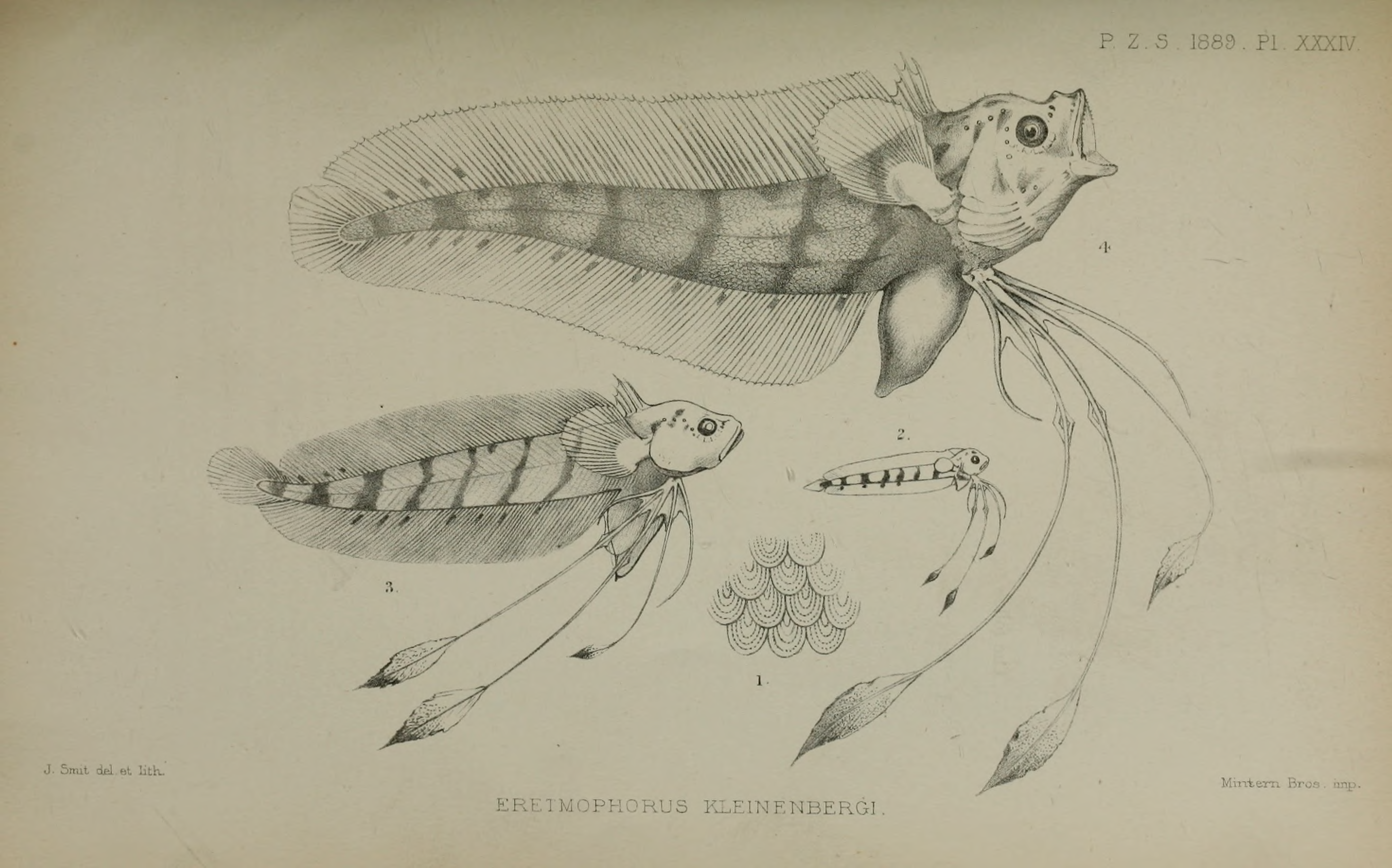

Conservation status
- Least Concern (IUCN 3.1)

Scientific classification
- Kingdom: Animalia
- Phylum: Chordata
- Class: Actinopterygii
- Division: Teleostei
- Order: Gadiformes
- Family: Moridae
- Genus: Eretmophorus; Giglioli, 1889
- Species: E. kleinenbergi

Binomial name
- Eretmophorus kleinenbergi Giglioli, 1889

= Eretmophorus =

Species of fish

Eretmophorus kleinenbergi is a species of morid cod found in the Mediterranean Sea and possibly into the Atlantic Ocean. This species grows to 8.9 cm (3.5 in) in standard length. It is the only known member of its genus. However, the validity of this species has been questioned; this species may be an immature stage of another species of morid cod, though it possibly is neotenic.
