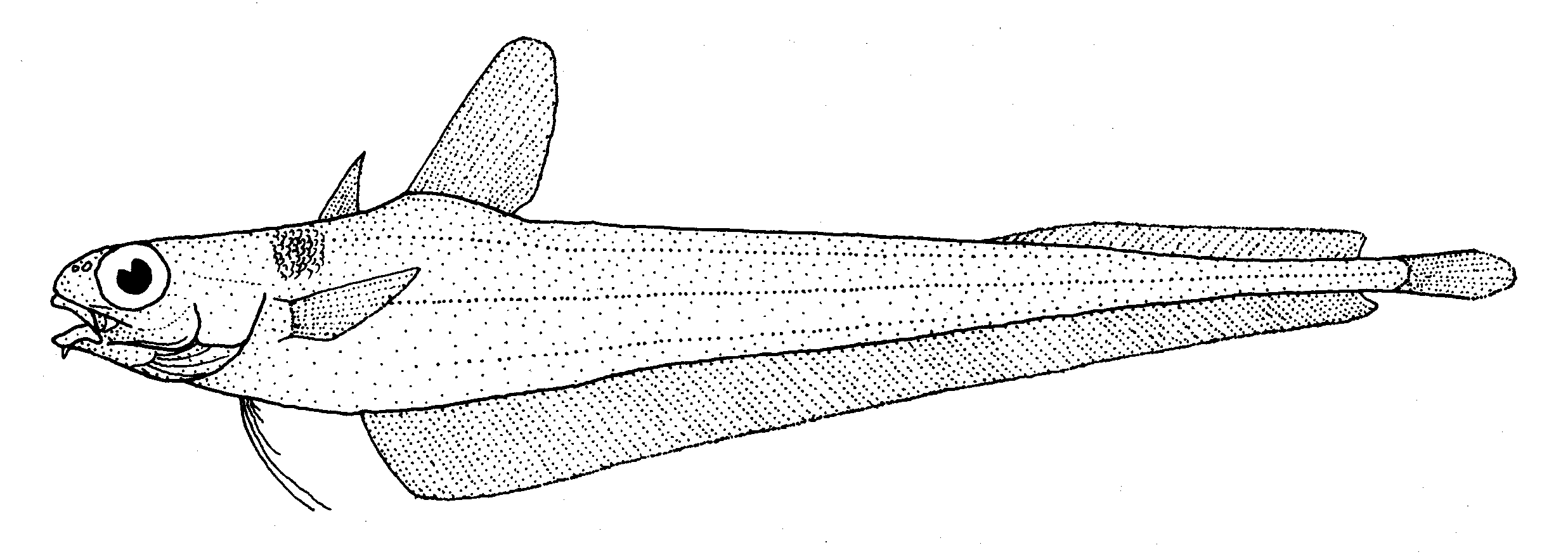
- Grenadier cod (T. gilchristi)

Scientific classification
- Kingdom: Animalia
- Phylum: Chordata
- Class: Actinopterygii
- Order: Gadiformes
- Family: Moridae
- Genus: Tripterophycis; Boulenger, 1902

Type species
- Tripterophycis gilchristi Boulenger, 1902

= Tripterophycis =

Genus of fishes

Tripterophycis is a genus of morid cods.

== Species ==
The currently recognized species in this genus are:

- Tripterophycis gilchristi Boulenger, 1902 (grenadier cod)
- Tripterophycis svetovidovi Sazonov & Shcherbachev, 1986 (brown grenadier cod)
