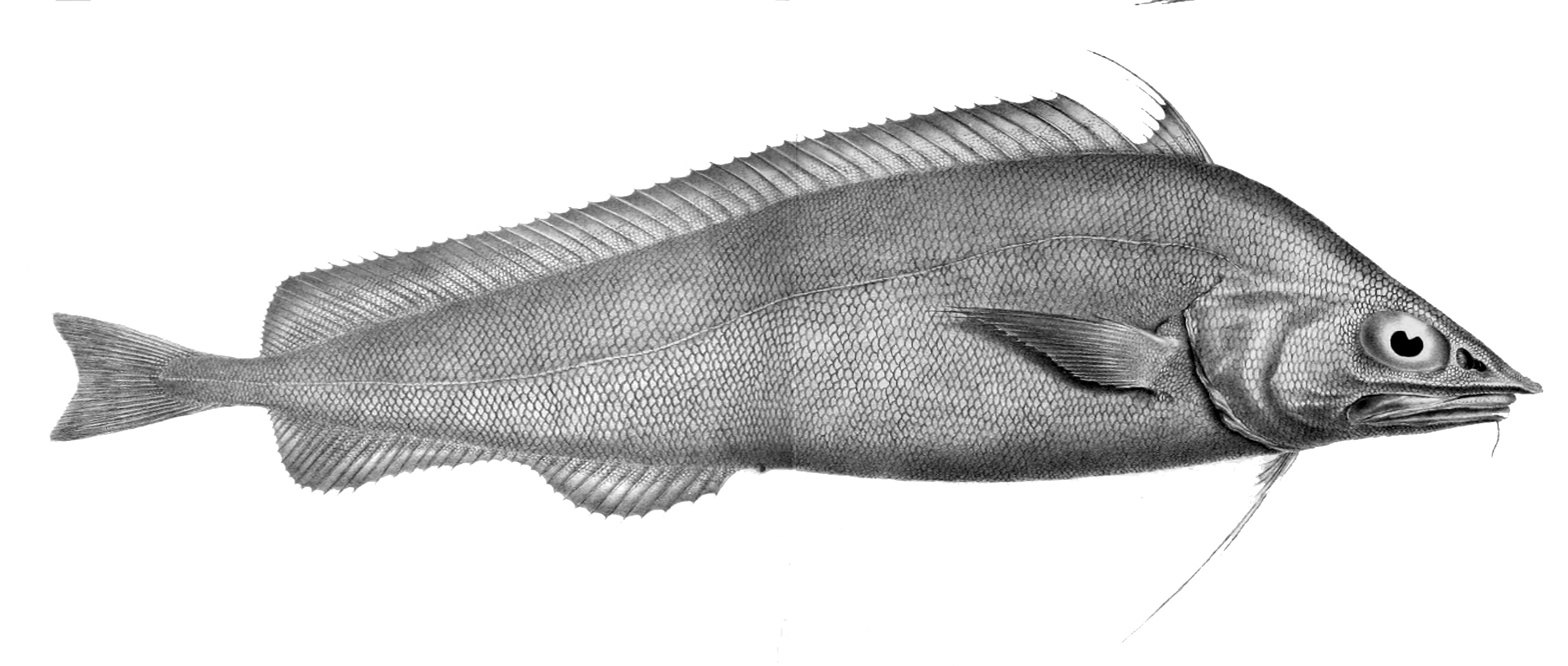
- Finescale Mora (A. microlepis)
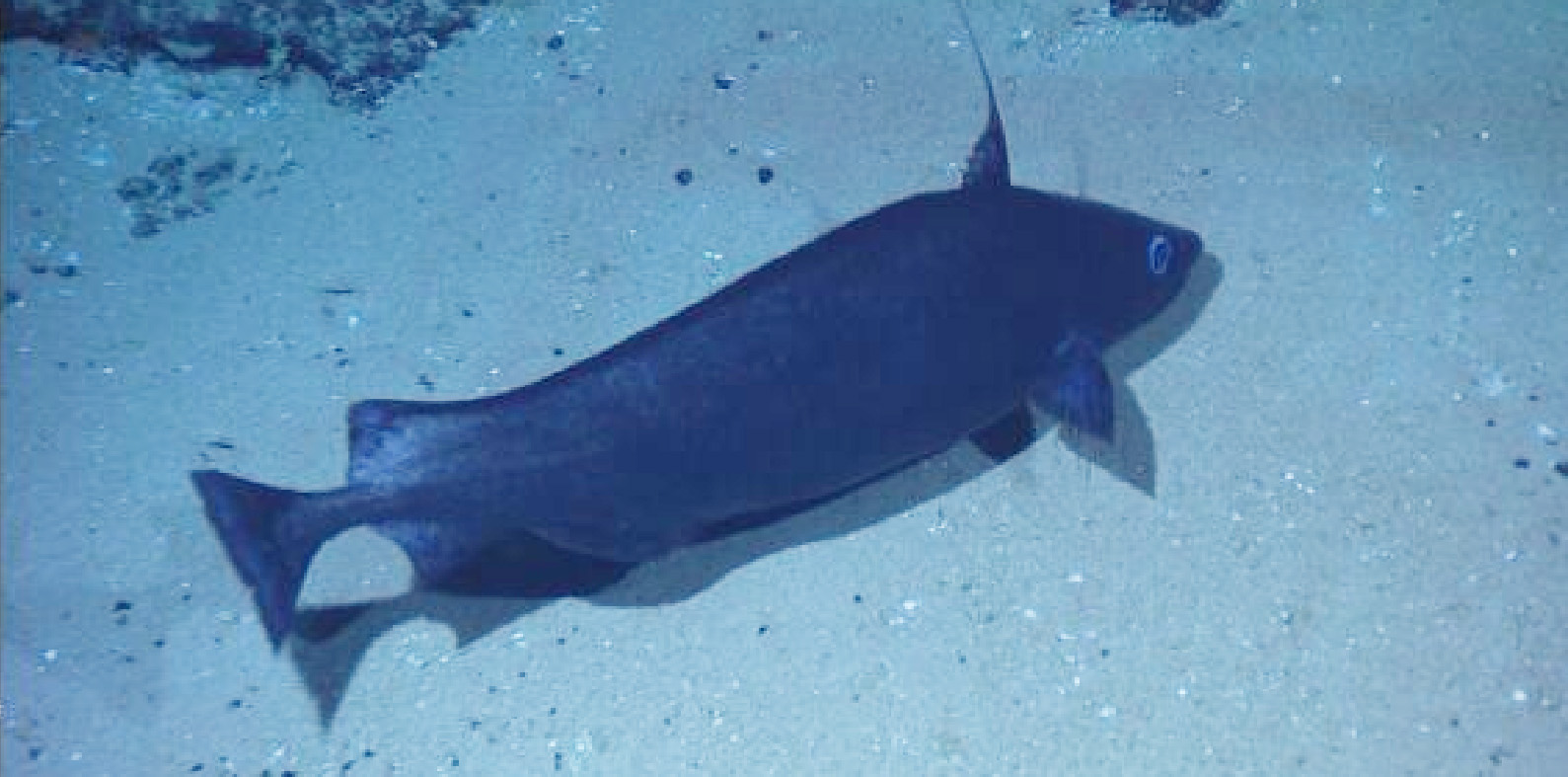
- Blue Antimora (A. rostrata)

Scientific classification
- Domain: Eukaryota
- Kingdom: Animalia
- Phylum: Chordata
- Class: Actinopterygii
- Order: Gadiformes
- Family: Moridae
- Genus: Antimora; Günther, 1878

Type species
- Haloporphyrus (Antimora) rostratus Günther, 1878

= Antimora =

Genus of fishes

Antimora is a genus of morid cods.

== Species ==
The currently recognized species in this genus are:

- Antimora microlepis T. H. Bean, 1890 (finescale mora)
- Antimora rostrata (Günther, 1878) (blue antimora)
