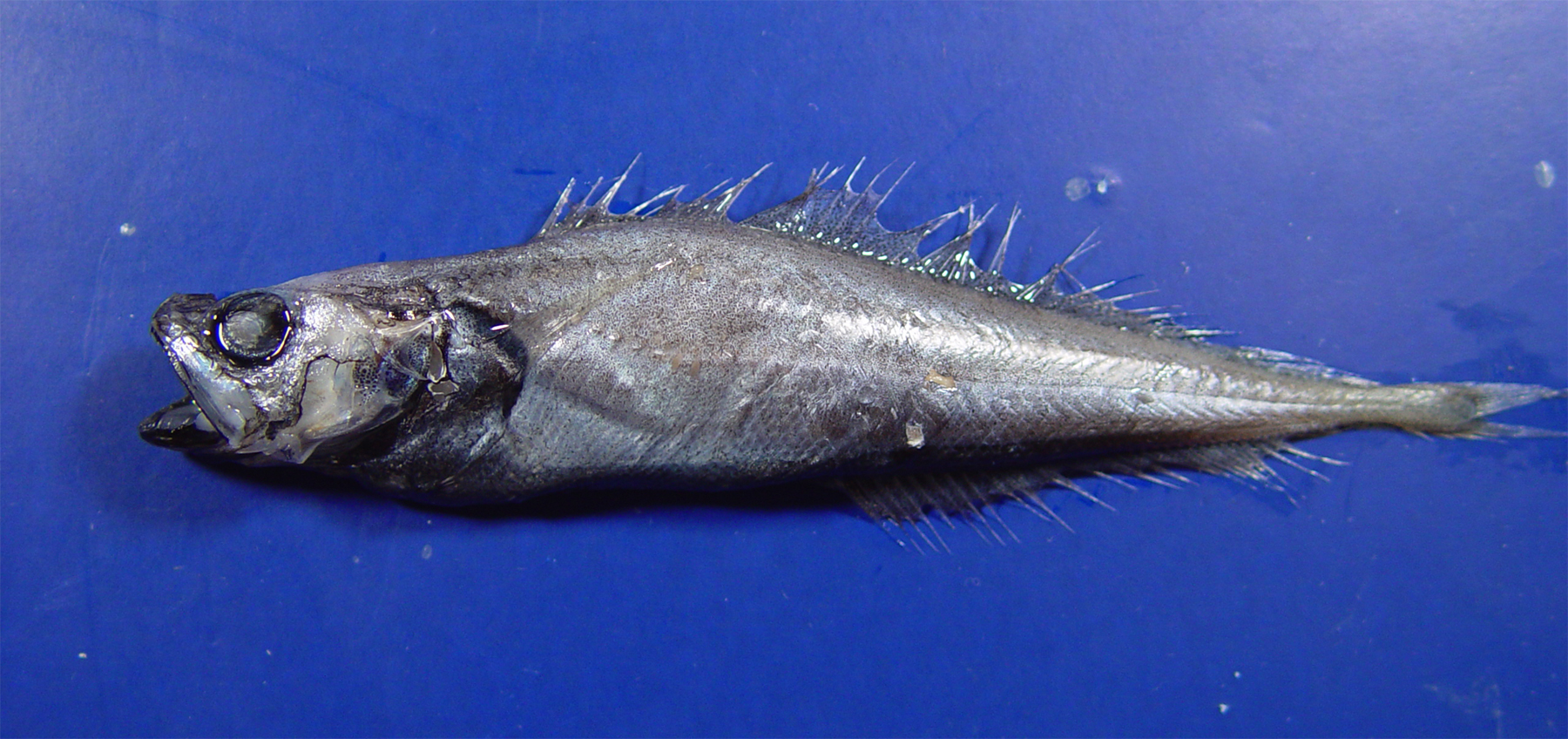
- Beardless Codling (G. imberbis)
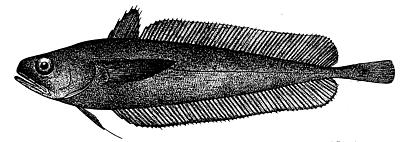
- Gadella (G. maraldi)

Scientific classification
- Kingdom: Animalia
- Phylum: Chordata
- Class: Actinopterygii
- Order: Gadiformes
- Family: Moridae
- Genus: Gadella; R. T. Lowe, 1843

Type species
- Gadella gracilis as a synonym of Gadella maraldi Lowe, 1843

Synonyms
- Brosmiculus Vaillant, 1888; Leptophycis Garman, 1899; Uraleptus Costa, 1846

= Gadella =

Gadella Temporal range: Pliocene to present

Genus of fishes

Gadella is a genus of morid cod. The species in this genus are characterised by the absence of a chin barbell, an anterior dorsal fin with 7-11 rays, a long based anal fin which has a straight profile, the outermost rays of the pelvic fin are filamentous and extend a small distance beyond the membrane. They do not have a photophore. The Gadella codlings are found around the tropical and subtropical seas around the world on the outer continental shelf to the mid continental slope. They are of no interest to fisheries.

== Species ==
The currently recognized species in this genus are:

- Gadella brocca Paulin & C. D. Roberts, 1997
- Gadella dancoheni Sazonov & Shcherbachev, 2000
- Gadella edelmanni (A. B. Brauer, 1906)
- Gadella filifer (Garman, 1899)
- Gadella imberbis (Vaillant, 1888) (beardless codling)
- Gadella jordani (J. E. Böhlke & Mead, 1951) (Jordan's cod)
- Gadella macrura Sazonov & Shcherbachev, 2000 (longtail cod)
- Gadella maraldi (A. Risso, 1810) (gadella)
- Gadella molokaiensis Paulin, 1989
- Gadella norops Paulin, 1987
- Gadella obscurus (Parin, 1984)
- Gadella svetovidovi Trunov, 1992
- Gadella thysthlon Long & McCosker, 1998

== See also ==
- Prehistoric fish
- List of prehistoric bony fish
