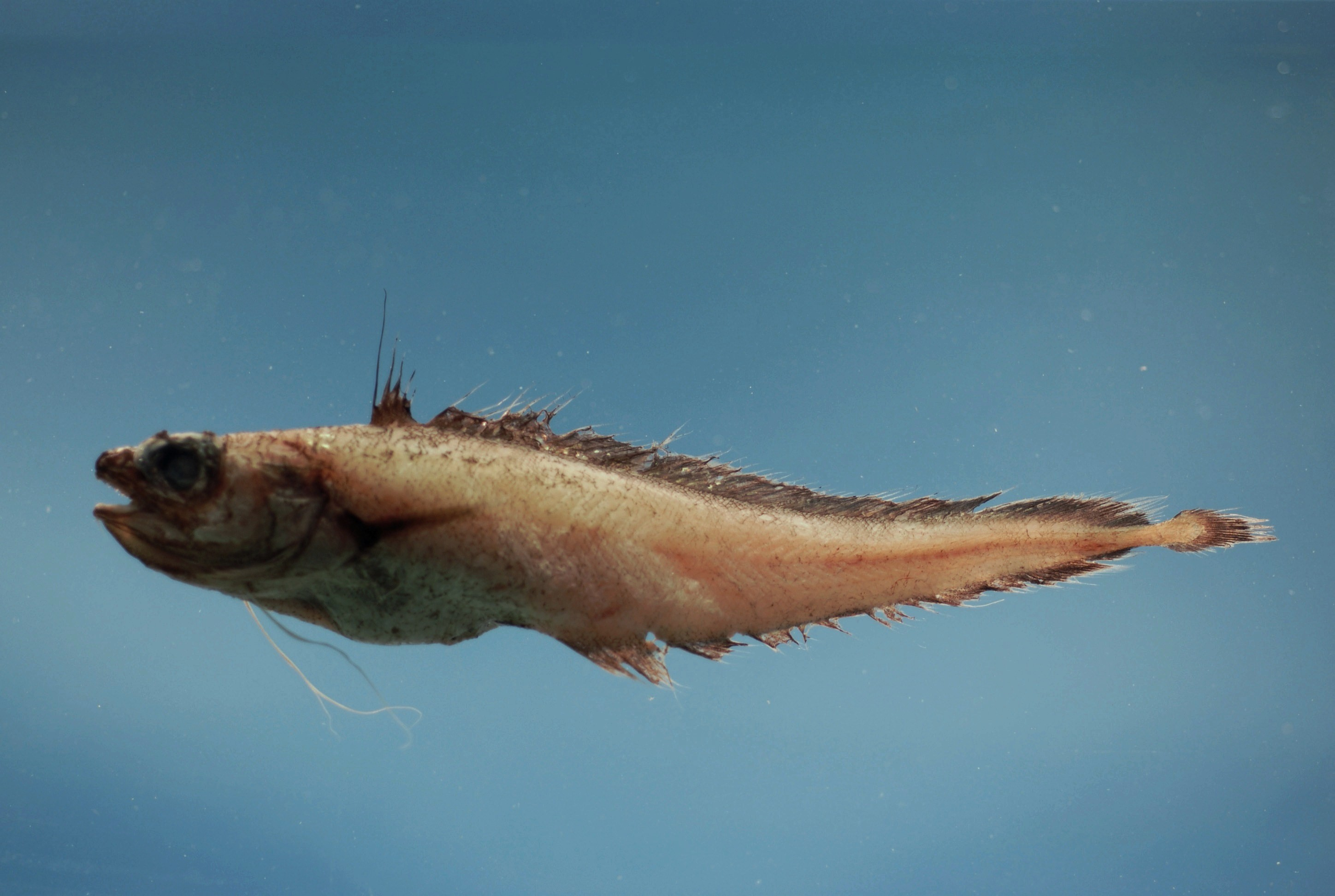

Scientific classification
- Kingdom: Animalia
- Phylum: Chordata
- Class: Actinopterygii
- Order: Gadiformes
- Family: Moridae
- Genus: Laemonema
- Species: L. barbatulum

Binomial name
- Laemonema barbatulum Goode & T. H. Bean, 1883

Synonyms
- Gargilius vitellius Koefoed, 1953; Laemonema barbatula Goode & Bean, 1883; Lotella maxillaris Bean, 1884

= Laemonema barbatulum =

Shortbeard codling

Species of fish

The short beard codling (Laemonema barbatulum) is a species of marine bony fish in the family Moridae. Native to the western Atlantic Ocean, it is found on the continental slope at depths between 50 and 1,620 m (200 and 5,300 ft).

== Description ==
The shortbeard codling can grow to a maximum standard length of about 33 cm (13 in) and takes the form of a somewhat spindle-shaped cylinder. The snout is fairly blunt and the upper jaw is slightly longer than the lower jaw. There is a short barbel on the chin and a flattened spine on the operculum. There are two dorsal fins with no spines and a total of from 69 to 76 soft rays. The first dorsal fin has 6 rays, the second of which is the longest, and the second dorsal fin originates immediately behind the first fin. Each pectoral fin has 17 to 23 soft rays. The pelvic fins are widely separated and each has two elongated soft rays; these fins originate to the front of the pectoral fins. The anal fin has no spines and has 57 to 63 soft rays. The caudal fin is small and rounded. The general colour of this fish is tan, the dorsal and anal fins having dark edges.

== Distribution and habitat ==
This species is found in the western Atlantic Ocean between about 57°N and 4°N, its range extending southwards from the Grand Banks of Newfoundland to the Bahamas, and the Gulf of Mexico, the depth range being from around 50 m (160 ft) down to about 1,620 m (5,300 ft).

== Ecology ==
L. barbatulum is one of the dominant fishes in the more open areas of the continental slope, away from deepwater coral reefs. Other fish found in these locations include the underworld windowskate (Fenestraja plutonia), the Atlantic hagfish Myxine glutinosa, and the shortnose greeneye Chlorophthalmus agassizi. It is a demersal predator, feeding on such invertebrates as bivalves, gastropod molluscs, polychaete worms and tanaids, crushing its prey with its beak-like jaws.
