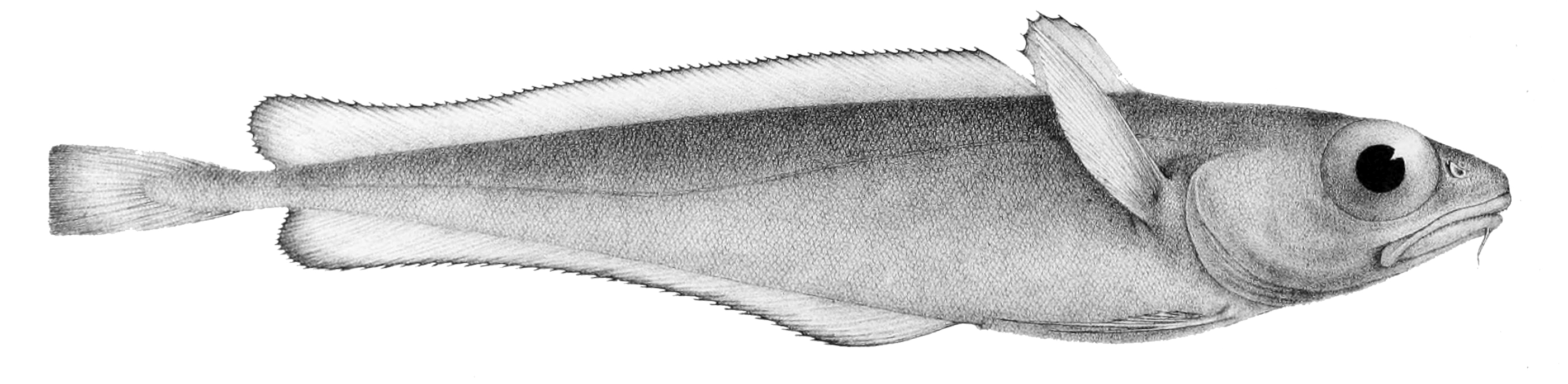
- Dwarf codling (N. marginata)

Scientific classification
- Kingdom: Animalia
- Phylum: Chordata
- Class: Actinopterygii
- Division: Teleostei
- Order: Gadiformes
- Family: Moridae
- Genus: Notophycis; Sazonov, 2001

Type species
- Lotella marginata Günther, 1878

= Notophycis =

Genus of fishes

Notophycis is a genus of morid cods.

== Species ==
The currently recognized species in this genus are:

- Notophycis fitchi Sazonov, 2001
- Notophycis marginata (Günther, 1878) (dwarf codling)
