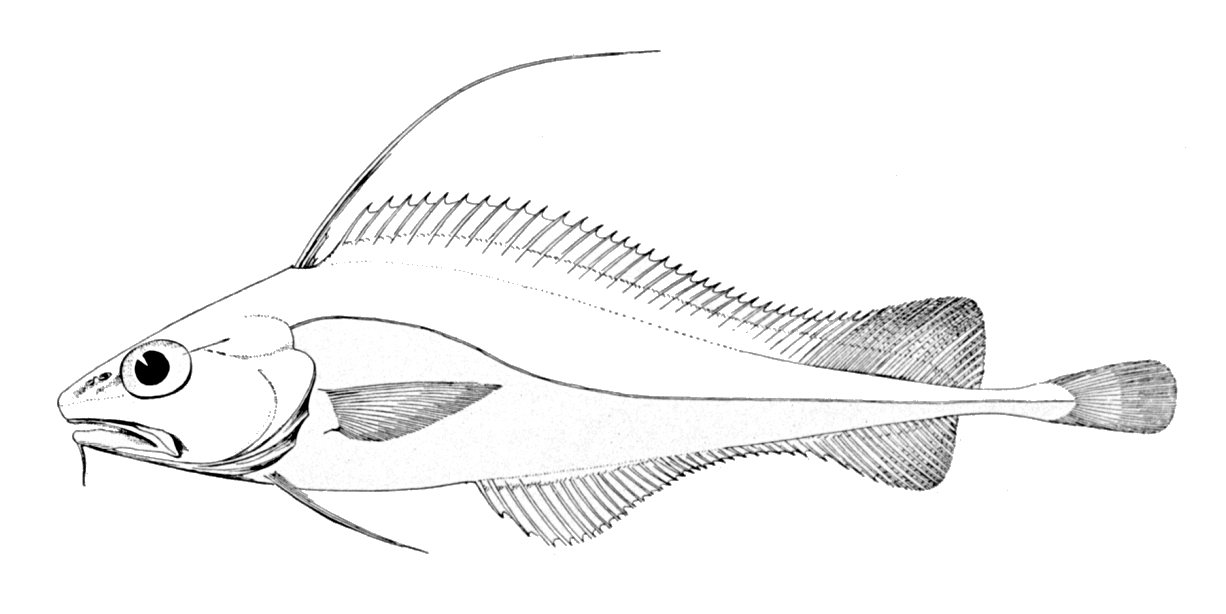
- Mediterranean codling (L. lepidion)
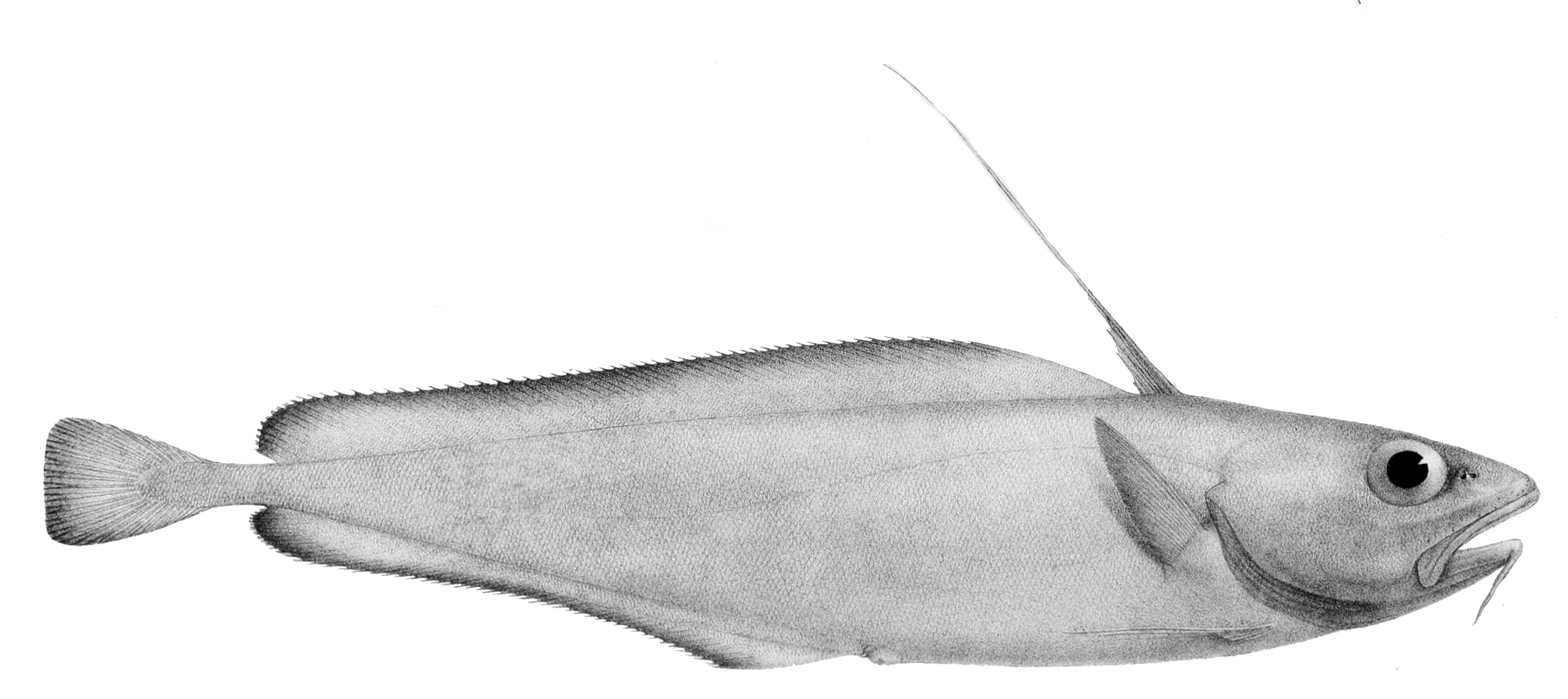
- Morid cod (L. inosimae)

Scientific classification
- Kingdom: Animalia
- Phylum: Chordata
- Class: Actinopterygii
- Order: Gadiformes
- Family: Moridae
- Genus: Lepidion; Swainson, 1838

Type species
- Gadus lepidion Risso, 1810

Synonyms
- Haloporphyrus Günther, 1862

= Lepidion =

Genus of fishes

Lepidion is a genus of morid cods.

== Species ==
The currently recognized species in this genus are:

- Lepidion capensis Gilchrist, 1922
- Lepidion ensiferus (Günther, 1887) (Patagonian codling)
- Lepidion eques (Günther, 1887) (North Atlantic codling)
- Lepidion guentheri (Giglioli, 1880)
- Lepidion inosimae (Günther, 1887) (morid cod)
- Lepidion lepidion (A. Risso, 1810) (Mediterranean codling)
- Lepidion microcephalus Cowper, 1956 (small-headed cod)
- Lepidion natalensis Gilchrist, 1922
- Lepidion schmidti Svetovidov (ru), 1936 (Schmidt's cod)
