= Svetovidovia =

Scientific classification
- Kingdom: Animalia
- Phylum: Chordata
- Class: Actinopterygii
- Division: Teleostei
- Order: Gadiformes
- Family: Moridae
- Genus: Svetovidovia; Cohen, 1973
- Species: S. lucullus

Binomial name
- Svetovidovia lucullus (A. S. Jensen, 1953)

Species of fish

Svetovidovia lucullus is a species of morid cod found in the polar regions of the northeastern Atlantic Ocean. This species grows to 50 cm (20 in) in standard length.
