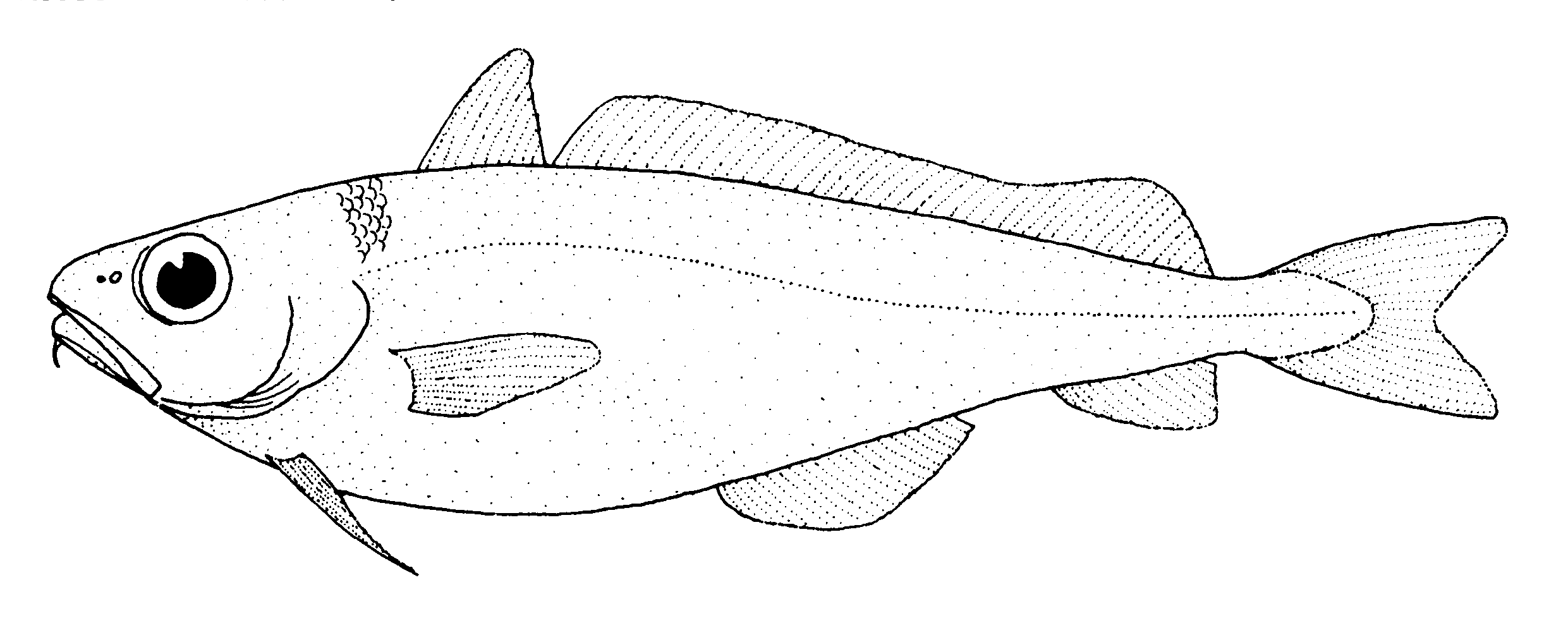
- Drawing by Dr Tony Ayling

Conservation status
- Least Concern (IUCN 3.1)

Scientific classification
- Kingdom: Animalia
- Phylum: Chordata
- Class: Actinopterygii
- Division: Teleostei
- Order: Gadiformes
- Family: Moridae
- Genus: Mora; A. Risso, 1827
- Species: M. moro

Binomial name
- Mora moro (A. Risso, 1810)

Synonyms
- Gadus moro Risso, 1810; ~~Mora mora~~ (Risso, 1810) (misspelling); Mora mediterranea Risso, 1827; Asellus canariensis Valenciennes, 1838; Mora pacifica Waite, 1914; Mora dannevigi Whitley, 1948

= Mora moro =

Common mora

Species of fish

Mora moro, the common mora, is a deep-sea fish, the only species in the genus Mora. It is found worldwide in temperate seas, at depths of between 300 and 2,500 m. Its length is up to about 80 cm. Other names in English include goodly-eyed cod, googly-eyed cod, and ribaldo.

In the month-long NORFANZ Expedition of 2003 which was examining the biodiversity of the seamounts and slopes of the Norfolk Ridge, 594 specimens averaging 1.25 kg (2.6 lb) were collected from 24 locations.

This large-eyed, generally gray species is of minor importance to commercial fisheries.
