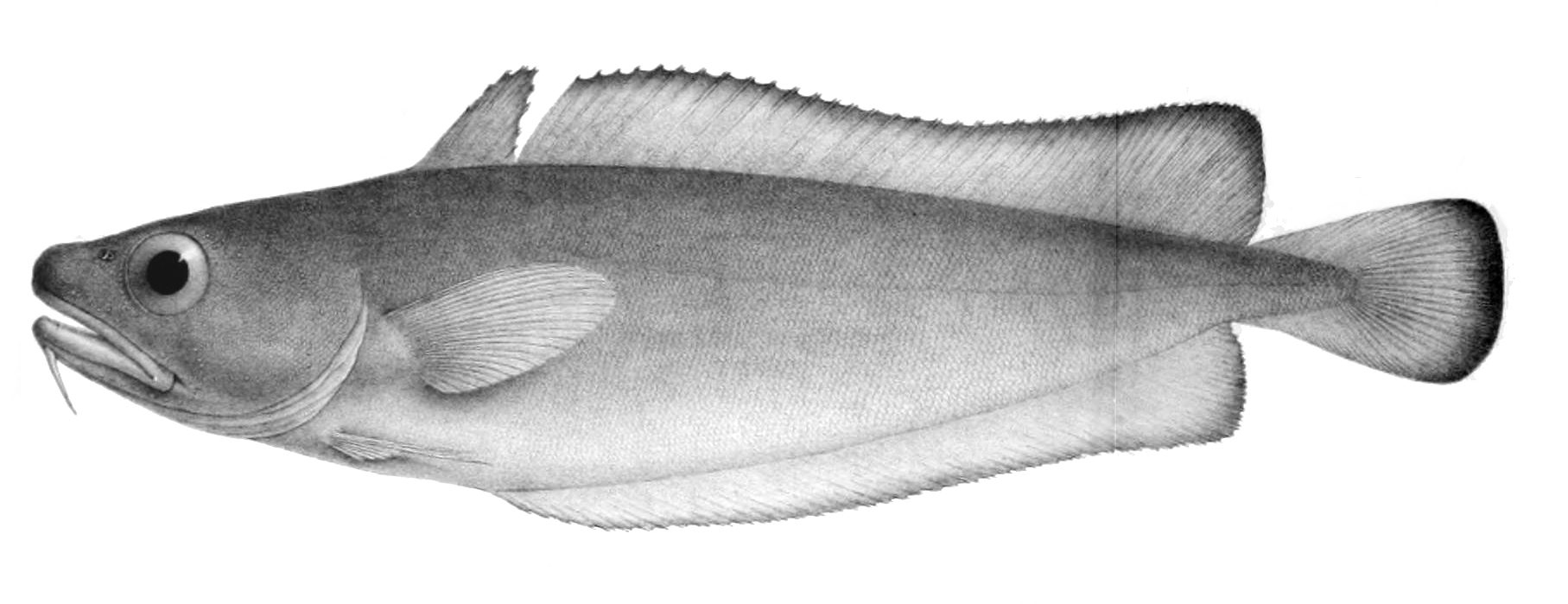

Scientific classification
- Kingdom: Animalia
- Phylum: Chordata
- Class: Actinopterygii
- Division: Teleostei
- Order: Gadiformes
- Family: Moridae
- Genus: Salilota; Günther, 1887
- Species: S. australis

Binomial name
- Salilota australis (Günther, 1878)

Synonyms
- Haloporphyrus australis Günther, 1878; Salilota bovei Perugia, 1891

= Salilota australis =

Species of fish

Salilota australis, the Patagonian cod or tadpole codling, is a species of morid cod found in the waters around the southern tip of South America and the Falkland Islands. It occurs at depths from 30 to 1,000 m (98 to 3,281 ft) and is of minor importance to local commercial fisheries. This species grows to 50 cm (20 in) in total length.
