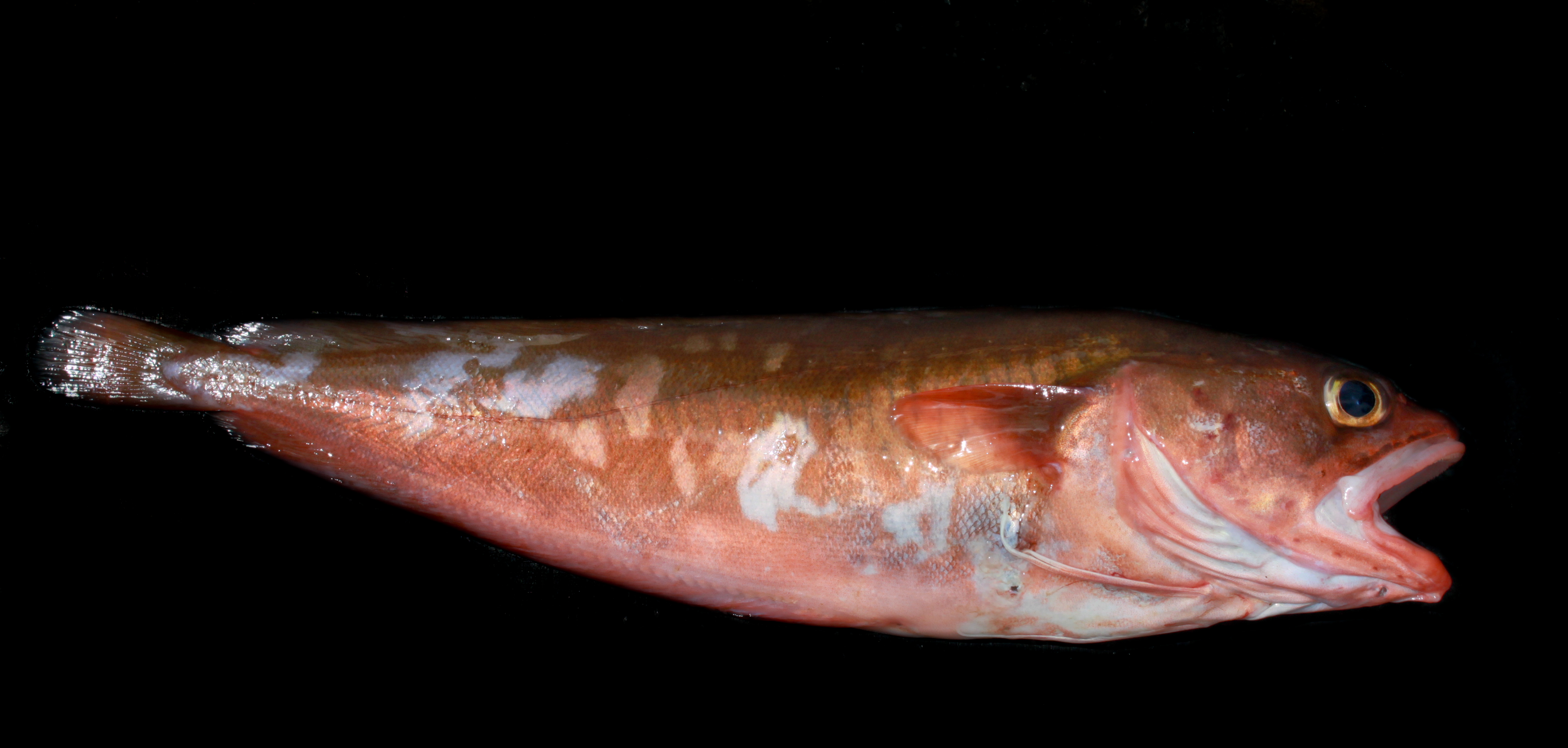

Scientific classification
- Kingdom: Animalia
- Phylum: Chordata
- Class: Actinopterygii
- Division: Teleostei
- Order: Gadiformes
- Family: Moridae
- Genus: Pseudophycis
- Species: P. bachus

Binomial name
- Pseudophycis bachus (J. R. Forster, 1801)

Synonyms
- Enchelyopus bachus Forster, 1801; Lotella bachus (Forster, 1801); Physiculus bachus (Forster, 1801)

= Red codling =

Species of fish

The red codling (Pseudophycis bachus; Māori: hoka) is a morid cod of the genus Pseudophycis, restricted to New Zealand, from the surface to 700 m. It reaches lengths up to 90cm. P. bachus is a food source for the diving yellow-eyed penguin (Megadyptes antipodes).

Environmental organisation Forest & Bird assessed the red cod "Worst Choice (Don't eat)" in its Best Fish Guide, which rates the ecological sustainability of seafoods.
