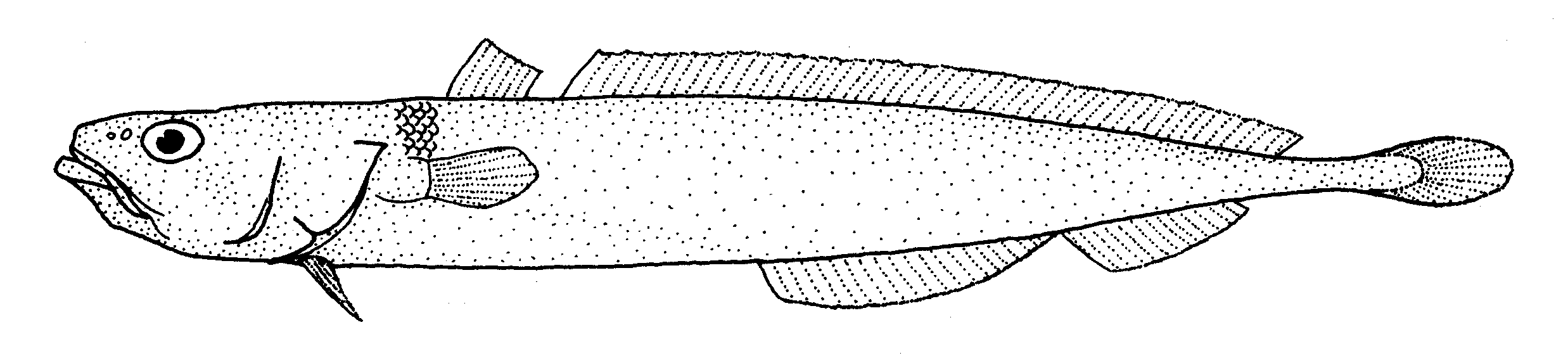
- Drawing by Dr Tony Ayling

Scientific classification
- Kingdom: Animalia
- Phylum: Chordata
- Class: Actinopterygii
- Division: Teleostei
- Order: Gadiformes
- Family: Moridae
- Genus: Halargyreus; Günther, 1862
- Species: H. johnsonii

Binomial name
- Halargyreus johnsonii Günther, 1862

= Slender codling =

Species of fish

The slender codling or slender cod (Halargyreus johnsonii) is a morid cod, the only species in the genus Halargyreus. It is found in all oceans, at depths from 450 to 3,000 m (1,480 to 9,840 ft), and grows to 56 cm (22 in) in total length. First discovered by and named after James Yate Johnson.
