= Tasmanian codling =

Scientific classification
- Kingdom: Animalia
- Phylum: Chordata
- Class: Actinopterygii
- Order: Gadiformes
- Family: Moridae
- Genus: Eeyorius; Paulin, 1986
- Species: E. hutchinsi

Binomial name
- Eeyorius hutchinsi Paulin, 1986

Species of fish

The Tasmanian codling (Eeyorius hutchinsi) is a species of morid cod only known from the waters around Tasmania and the Australian states of Western Australia and Victoria. It is found in relatively shallow waters at depths from 8 to 12 m (30 to 40 ft). This species grows to 26 cm (10 in) in total length. This is the only known species in its genus.

== Etymology ==
The genus name Eeyorius is derived from the character Eeyore from A. A. Milne's Winnie the Pooh stories because Eeyore "lived in damp places". The species epithet honors J. Barry Hutchins, an ichthyologist with the Western Australian Museum.
