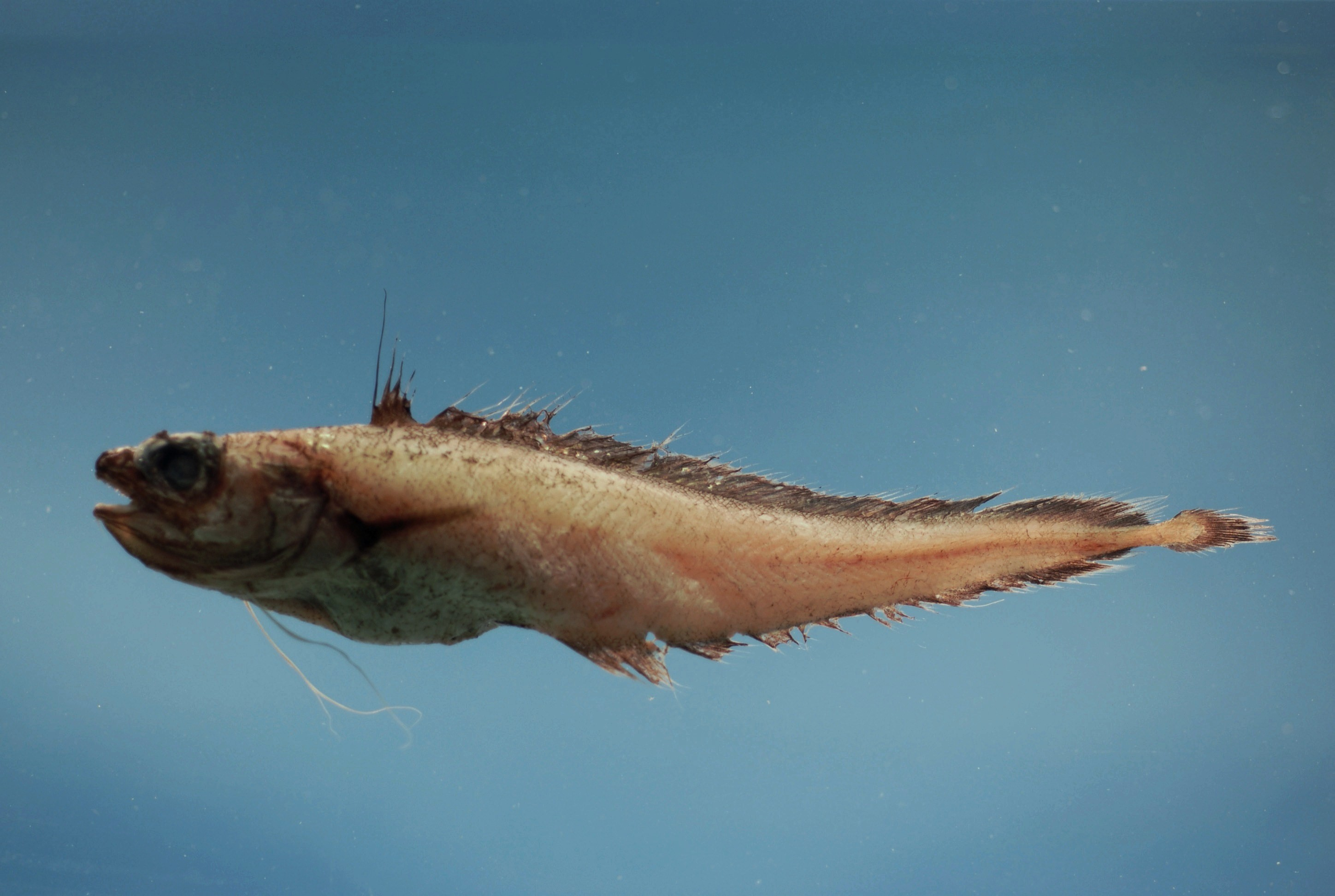
- Shortbeard codling (L. barbatulum)
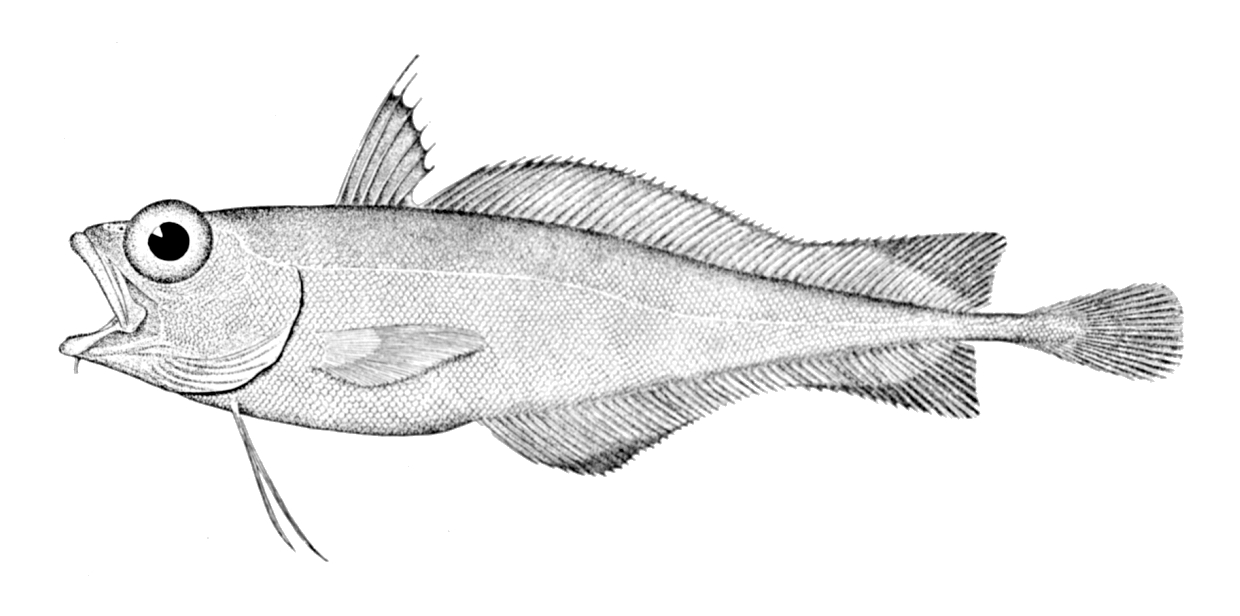
- L. melanurum

Scientific classification
- Kingdom: Animalia
- Phylum: Chordata
- Class: Actinopterygii
- Order: Gadiformes
- Family: Moridae
- Genus: Laemonema; Günther, 1862

Type species
- Laemonema robustum Johnson, 1862

Synonyms
- Gargilius Jensen, 1953; Laemonemodes Gilchrist, 1903; Microlepidium Garman, 1899; Podonema Rass, 1954; Podonematichthys Whitley, 1965

= Laemonema =

Genus of fishes

Laemonema is a genus of morid cods.

== Species ==
The 17 currently recognized species in this genus are:

- Laemonema barbatulum Goode & T. H. Bean, 1883 (shortbeard codling)
- Laemonema compressicauda (Gilchrist, 1903)
- Laemonema filodorsale Okamura, 1982
- Laemonema goodebeanorum Meléndez C. & Markle, 1997
- Laemonema gracillipes Garman, 1899
- Laemonema laureysi Poll, 1953 (Guinean codling)
- Laemonema longipes P. J. Schmidt, 1938 (longfin codling)
- Laemonema macronema Meléndez C. & Markle, 1997
- Laemonema melanurum Goode & T. H. Bean, 1896
- Laemonema modestum (V. Franz, 1910)
- Laemonema nana Iw. Taki, 1953
- Laemonema palauense Okamura, 1982
- Laemonema rhodochir C. H. Gilbert, 1905
- Laemonema robustum J. Y. Johnson, 1862 (robust mora)
- Laemonema verecundum (D. S. Jordan & Cramer, 1897) (bighead mora)
- Laemonema yarrellii (R. T. Lowe, 1838)
- Laemonema yuvto Parin & Sazonov, 1990
