= James Yate Johnson =

English naturalist

James Yate Johnson (c. 1820, in Kendal, Westmorland – 2 February 1900, in Funchal) was an English naturalist.

Johnson lived in Madeira from around 1851, studied marine fish, crustacea, sea anemones and sponges and terrestrial spiders, flowering plants and mosses. He collected specimens for other naturalists; for instance, George Busk, who in 1859 wrote "Zoophytology: On some Madeiran Polyzoa." Collected by J. Yates Johnson, Esq. in the Quarterly Journal of Microscopical Science, vol. 7, pp. 65–67. He discovered Halargyreus johnsonii and Melanocetus johnsonii Günther, 1864 during his time in Madeira.

Johnson explored the São Vicente Caves after being informed of their existence by locals on Madeira in 1885. The caves were opened to the public on 1 October 1996, being one of the first caves of volcanic origins to be opened to the public in Portugal.

== Family ==
He was the son of John Henry Johnson and Ann Yate, also brother of John Henry Johnson (patent attorney).

== Works ==
Partial list

- 1863 Descriptions of five new species of fishes obtained at Madeira. Proceedings of the Zoological Society of London 1863 (33): 36–46, pl. VII
- 1866. Description of Trachichthys darwini, a new species of berycoid fish from Madeira. Proc. zool. Soc. Lond. : 311–315.
- 1867. Description of a new genus and a new species of macrurous decapod crustaceans, belonging to the Penaeidae, discovered at Madeira. Proc. zool. Soc. Lond. 1867, pp. 895–901. – describes the genus Funchalia
- 1880. "Hawaiian or Sandwich Islands, The" . Encyclopædia Britannica. Vol. 11 (9th ed.). 1880.
- 1899. Notes on some Sponges belonging to the Clionidae obtained at Madeira. Journal of the Royal Microscopical Society 1899:461-463, pl.

== Taxon named in his honor ==
- Halargyreus johnsonii
- Melanocetus johnsonii Günther, 1864
