= John Henry Johnson (patent attorney) =

British patent attorney

John Henry Johnson (1828 in Kendal, United Kingdom – 12 March 1900) was one of the first specialist patent agents in the United Kingdom and became the founding President of the Institute of Patent Agents, now the Chartered Institute of Patent Attorneys (CIPA), on its formation in 1882. He was the brother of James Yate Johnson.

The UK firm of Patent and Trade Mark Attorneys of Bromhead Johnson (formerly J. Y. & G. W. Johnson) traces its history back to John Henry Johnson and his sons James Yate Johnson and George William Johnson. The Scottish firm of Patent and Trade Mark Attorneys of Johnsons traces its history back to John Henry Johnson, his son James Yate Johnson, his grandson Christopher Johnson and his great grandson Edward Yate Johnson.
