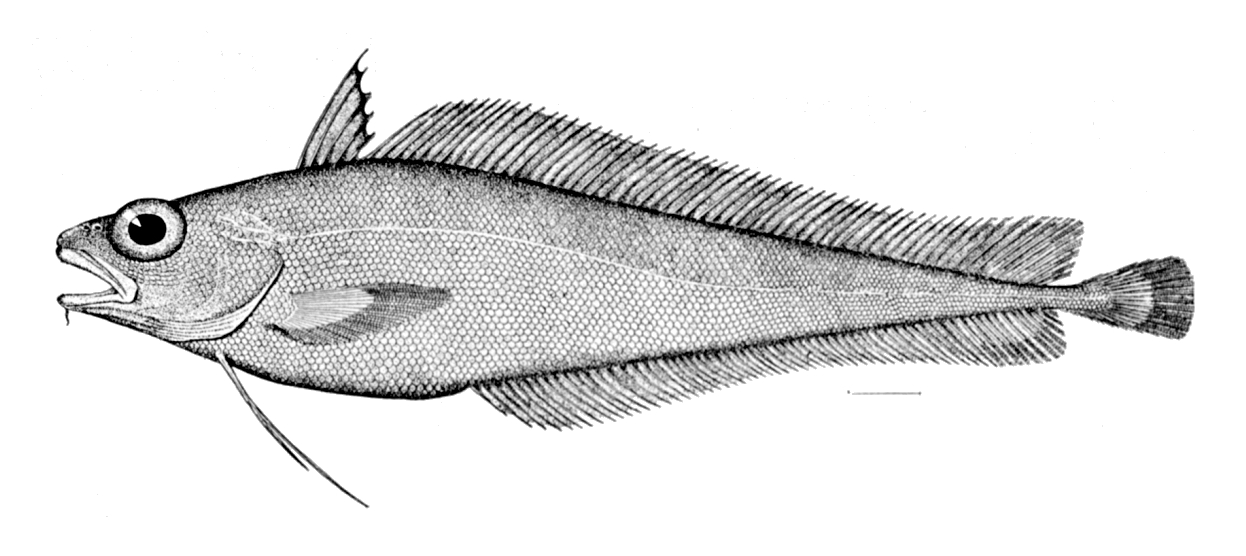
- Shortbeard codling, Laemonema barbatulum

Scientific classification
- Kingdom: Animalia
- Phylum: Chordata
- Class: Actinopterygii
- Order: Gadiformes
- Suborder: Macrouroidei
- Family: Moridae; Moreau, 1881

Genera
- See text

= Moridae =

Moridae Temporal range: Early Oligocene–present

Family of fishes

The Moridae are a family of cod-like fishes, known as codlings, hakelings, and moras.

Morids are marine fishes found throughout the world, and may be found at depths to 2,500 m (8,200 ft), although most prefer shallower waters. In appearance, they greatly resemble the typical cods, from which can only be distinguished by their skeletal features and the structure of the swim bladder.

They grow up to 90 cm (35 in) long (red codling, Pseudophycis bachus).

== Taxonomy ==
The following genera are known:

- Antimora Günther, 1878
- Auchenoceros Günther, 1889
- Eeyorius Paulin, 1986
- Eretmophorus Giglioli, 1889
- Gadella Lowe, 1843
- Guttigadus Taki, 1953
- Halargyreus Günther, 1862
- Laemonema Günther, 1862
- Lepidion Swainson, 1838
- Lotella Kaup, 1858
- Mora Risso, 1827
- Notophycis Sazonov, 2001
- Physiculus Kaup, 1858
- Pseudophycis Günther, 1862
- Rhynchogadus Tortonese, 1948
- Salilota Günther, 1887
- Svetovidovia Cohen, 1973
- Tripterophycis Boulenger, 1902

The following fossil genera are known:

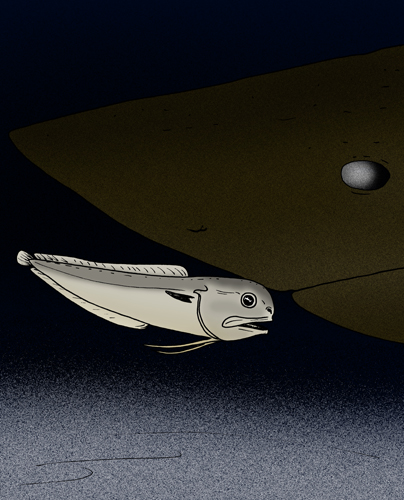
Life restoration of Eophycis, the earliest fossil member of the family

- †Eophycis Jerzmańska, 1968 (Early Oligocene of France, Poland, and North Caucasus, Russia)
- †Fanteichthys Carnevale, 2005 (Middle Miocene of Italy)

An indeterminate fossil morid is known from the Late Oligocene or Early Miocene of Chubut, Argentina.
