= List of historic places in Clutha District =

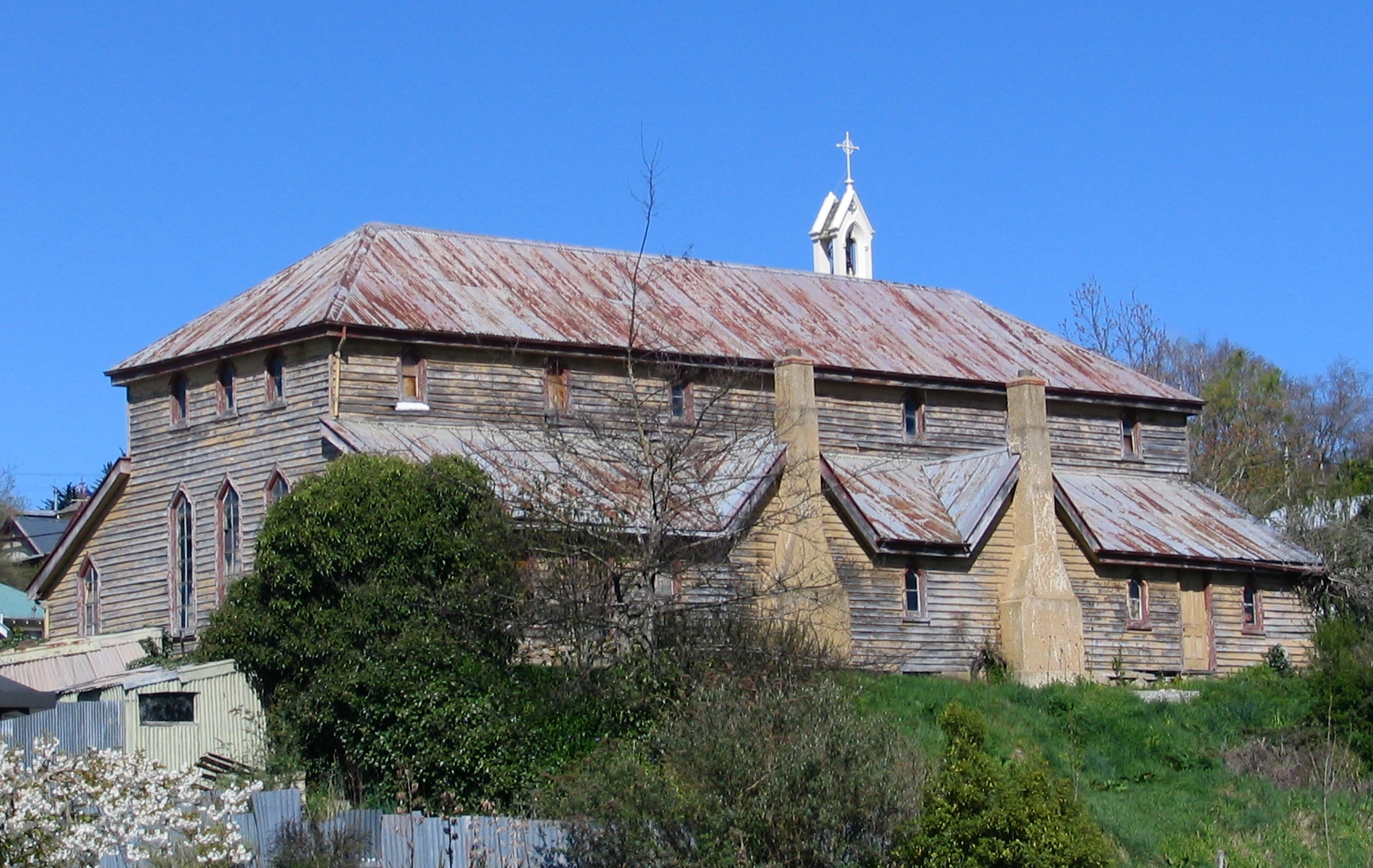
St Patrick's Church School and Hall, a Category 1 Historic Place in Lawrence

Clutha District is a territorial authority in the south of the Otago region of the South Island of New Zealand. First occupied by the Māori, the region saw settlement by European sealers and whalers in the 1830s. They founded Port Molyneux near the mouth of the Clutha River. Although some European land claims were made in the region during the 1840s and 1850s, the discovery of gold in 1861 triggered the Otago gold rush and a large number of settlers. Coal mining developed in the district during the late 1860s. By the mid-20th century, mining had greatly declined. The district has become largely agricultural.

Heritage New Zealand classification of sites on the New Zealand Heritage List / Rārangi Kōrero, in accordance with the Heritage New Zealand Pouhere Taonga Act 2014, distinguishes between Category 1 ("places of special or outstanding historical or cultural significance") and Category 2 ("places of historic or cultural significance"). Some sites important to Māori communities are given special classifications, although none of these sites are located within Clutha District itself. A total of sixty-three listed sites are located in Clutha District, including forty-seven Category 2 sites and fourteen Category 1 sites. The largest number of sites are in the communities of Lawrence and Inch Clutha.

== Places ==
List of historic places in Clutha District
Name	Classification	Location	Constructed	Registered	List number	Notes	Image	Ref.
Sir Truby King Railway Bridge	Category 2	Near 85 Harrington Mill Road, Tahakopa	1922–1923	2020	9727	A railway bridge spanning the Tahakopa River. It allowed access for Truby King's privately owned rail line which connected Tahakopa to his sawmill. The first bridge was built in 1916, which was replaced by another timber and iron bridge in 1922. The sawmill closed in 1929 and the bridge was abandoned.		
Otago Pioneer Quartz Mine Complex	Category 1	Waipori Road and Mitchells Flat Road, Waipori	1862	2016	9692	A quartz reef mine founded during the Otago gold rush. Mining began in 1862 when a group of prospectors discovered gold-bearing quartz at Waipori. The mine complex was used by around seventy different mining companies between its founding and its abandonment in 1912.		
Balclutha Courthouse (former)	Category 2	1 Paisley Street and Renfrew Street, Balclutha	1924–1926	2016	9690	A one-storey brick and concrete courthouse designed by John Mair in 1924, replacing an earlier dilapidated structure. It was initially planned to be built with wood in 1913; residents were angered by the choice of material, and plans were shelved for the following decade. It was closed in 2011 over concerns of improper earthquake strengthening, and services were moved to Dunedin.		
Tuapeka Mouth Punt and Jetty	Category 1	Clutha River Road and Ferry Road, Tuapeka Mouth	1895–1896, 1915	2013	9599	The last remaining punt reaction ferry in New Zealand, previously a common solution to river crossings. An adjacent puntman's shed was demolished in 2011.	A dock spanning to a punt ferry in a river, a platform at the end of the dock resting on two small boats	
Black Horse Brewery Site	Category 1	Wetherstons Road, Bluejacket Gully, Wetherstons	1865	2013	9598	The ruined remains of a brewery which operated from 1865 to 1923. Portions were demolished in the 1940s, but much of the site remains.		
Maclennan Historic Area	Historic Area	2256 – 2290 Papatowai Highway, Maclennan	1913–1930	2019	9259	A small community which emerged around a station of the Catlins River Branch in 1914. Built to sustain sawmills in the region, it declined as much of the surrounding forest was cleared. The rail line was closed in 1971.		
Tuapeka Mouth School (former) and Memorial Gates	Category 2	Tuapeka Mouth Road & Pit Road, Tuapeka Mouth	1879, 1930	2011	9264	A school building opened in 1879 to support the town of Tuapeka Mouth. Memorial gates were installed at the school in 1930 for its diamond jubilee. It was closed in 1949, and converted into a community centre and retreat camp.		
Gabriel's Gully	Category 1	Gabriels Gully Road and Blue Spur Road, Lawrence	1861	2009	7789	The site of the first major gold find in Otago in 1861, initiating the Otago gold rush. Hundreds of thousands of ounces of gold were produced at the site during the early 1860s. Although production declined, gold continued to be mined at the site until 1912, with intermittent activity during the 1930s.	A valley covered in golden grasses and dotted by small bushes	
Somerville Park	Category 2	92 Waitepeka Road, Waitepeka	1860–1930s	2007	7723	The site of a flour mill during the mid-to-late 1800s. After a mill built at Warepa burnt down, a new mill was constructed by the Somerville family in Waitepeka. It was surrounded by various family houses, a general store, and supporting buildings. Although partially derelict, it continues to be owned by the family.		
Stewart House (former)	Category 1	Waitepeka School Road, Waitepeka	c. 1863	2006	7660	A one-and-a-half storey wooden house built around 1863 by Donald Stewart. Unlike many other surviving early houses, it has never been retrofitted for later technologies.		
Lawrence Chinese Graves Historic Area	Historic Area	Gabriel Street, Lawrence	-	2004	7546	A cemetery containing the graves of Chinese immigrant workers, mainly miners, who worked in the area's goldfields. One large above-ground tomb belongs to a prominent local hotelier, Sam Chiew Lain.		
Lawrence Chinese Camp	Category 1	116 Lawrence-Beaumont Highway, Lawrence	1869–1899	2019	7526	A neighborhood settled by Chinese immigrant miners beginning around 1869. At its peak, it housed around 500 miners and their businesses. The population steadily declined after the 1880s, until it was abandoned in 1945.		
Whareview	Category 2	3 Iona Street, Lawrence	late 1870s	1993	7121	A wooden cottage built around the late 1870s, it was given a major brick extension during the 1910s, when it fell under the ownership of brewer James Kerr Simpson. It remains a private residence.		
Midden	Category 2	Near Jack's Bay Road, Jack's Bay	-	1985	5652	A Māori midden.		
Midden	Category 2	Near Jack's Bay Road, Jack's Bay	-	1985	5651	A Māori midden.		
Midden	Category 2	Near Jack's Bay Road, Jack's Bay	-	1985	5650	A Māori midden.		
Midden	Category 2	Near Hinahina Road, Hinahina	-	1985	5649	A Māori midden.		
Midden	Category 2	Cannibal Bay, near New Haven	-	1985	5648	A Māori midden.		
Midden	Category 2	Near Kaka Point Road, Kaka Point	-	1985	5647	A Māori midden.		
Midden	Category 2	Near Nugget Point	-	1985	5646	A Māori midden.		
Oven	Category 2	Near Tahakopa	-	1985	5631	The remains of a Māori oven.		
Midden	Category 2	Near Chaslands Highway, Papatowai	-	1985	5630	A Māori midden.		
Midden / Burial	Category 2	Near Chaslands Highway, Papatowai	-	1985	5629	A Māori midden and burial site.		
Midden	Category 2	Southeast of Maclennan	-	1985	5628	A Māori midden.		
Ovens	Category 2	Near Pukeawa	-	1985	5627	The remains of Māori ovens.		
David Johnston’s Boot Shop (former)	Category 2	27 Ross Place, Lawrence	1880	1990	5237	A one-storey brick store with a stone foundation, replacing an earlier building which burnt down. It continues to be used as a retail space.		
Clark's Boot Store (former)	Category 2	15 Ross Place, Lawrence	c. 1880s	1990	5236	A single-storey brick storefront built at an unclear date in the late 19th century. It was used by various retailers until it was sold to a bootmaker who operated out of the building from 1910 to 1946. It has continued to rotate between various businesses.		
Gilroy Homestead Cowshed	Category 2	66 Riverbank Road, Inch Clutha	-	1990	5235	Shares a site with the Gilroy Homestead (#5203) and the Gilroy Homestead Stables and Loft (#5204).		
Bank of New South Wales (former)	Category 2	37 Ross Place and Peel Street, Lawrence	1929	1990	5216	A two-storey timber building built in 1929 by the prominent architectural firm Mason & Wales, replacing an earlier building built in 1865. It was sold in 1971 and converted into a private residence.	A two storey bank building at a street corner with white siding and a green roof	
F. Martin Building (former)	Category 2	35 Ross Place, Lawrence	c. 1912	1990	5215	A one-storey brick and corrugated iron building originally used as a bakery by Frederick Martin in the early 1910s. It served as a storefront for various businesses after Martin's death. It remains a retail location.	A brick storefront with a sign reading F. MARTIN	
Bank of New Zealand (former)	Category 2	21 Ross Place and Lancaster Street, Lawrence	1885–1886	1990	5214	A two-storey brick building designed by Dunedin architect John Arthur Burnside. Originally a branch of the Bank of New Zealand, it was abandoned in the 1970s, but converted into a bar and restaurant in the mid-1990s.	An old two-storey bank building	
Miller’s Temperance Hotel (former)	Category 2	20 Ross Place, Lawrence	1886	1990	5213	A two-storey brick building initially established as a temperance hotel. It was purchased and converted into a drapery store in 1898–1899, and has since hosted various shops.		
Shops	Category 2	26 – 28 Ross Place, Lawrence	late 19th century	1990	5212	Two adjacent late 19th century shops along the main street of Lawrence. They are both brick buildings with timber facades.	Two old storefronts with large facades	
Tuapeka Times Office (former)	Category 2	9 Ross Place, Lawrence	1896	1990	5210	It originally housed the Tuapeka Times, a local newspaper which moved into the building from an earlier office before 1896. The newspaper ceased publication in 1941, and the building has been owned by the Lawrence Athenaeum and Mining Institute since 1951.	A one-storey grey building with a large facade and a redish roof. A sign at the front reads Athenaeum.	
Ashley Downs Homestead	Category 2	34 Taylor Road, Ashley Downs	after 1869	1990	5209	Ashley Downs was a sheep run established in 1869 by John Gibson, who employed large numbers of teamsters, shepherds, and Chinese laborers on the estate. It was subdivided into smaller properties in 1907–1908.		
Waiwera Hotel (former)	Category 2	4 Waiwera Station Road, Waiwera South	1857	1990	5208	A hotel which served miners headed towards the goldfields during the 1860s Otago gold rush.		
Railway Bridge (Blair)	Category 2	Main South Line, Balclutha	1878	1990	5207	A railway bridge of the Main South Line spanning the Clutha River. It was designed by District Engineer William Newsham Blair. During the 1960s and 1970s, the original timber trusses were replaced with steel.		
Inveresk Barn and Mens' Quarters	Category 2	499 Kaitangata Highway, Inch Clutha	before 1894	1990	5206	Farm established by settler Hay Gilroy, who arrived in the region in 1864.		
Inveresk Homestead	Category 2	499 Kaitangata Highway, Inch Clutha	before 1894	1990	5205	Farm established by settler Hay Gilroy, who arrived in the region in 1864.		
Gilroy Homestead Stables and Loft	Category 2	66 Riverbank Road, Inch Clutha	-	1990	5204	Shares a site with the Gilroy Homestead (#5203) and the Gilroy Homestead Cowshed (#5235).		
Gilroy Homestead	Category 2	66 Riverbank Road, Inch Clutha	-	1990	5203	Shares a site with the Gilroy Homestead Cowshed (#5235) and the Gilroy Homestead Stables and Loft (#5204).		
Inch Clutha School House (former)	Category 2	186 Riverbank Road and Lawson Road, Inch Clutha	-	1990	5202	A school in Inch Clutha which operated from 1858 to 1878.	A drawing of a white schoolhouse in a grassy environment with trees surrounding it	
Balmoral Homestead	Category 2	147 Chicory Road, Inch Clutha	-	1990	5201	A homestead on the northern portion of the river island of Inch Clutha, close to the town of Balclutha.		
Telford Woolshed and Stables	Category 2	92 Provincial Highway, Otanomomo	-	1990	5199	A large brick building initially housing a woolshed and stables. The farm property became the Telfold Farm Training Institute during the 1960s; the woolshed building was initially used as a workshop, but was converted into a library in 1995.		
Lawrence Court House (former)	Category 1	4 Colonsay Street, Lawrence	1874–1875	1991	5184	A stone and concrete courthouse designed by Dunedin architect David Ross. It replaced an earlier court built on the site in 1866. The court closed in 1953. Although used by various government offices during the 1960s and 1970s, it fell vacant by the 2010s.	A two storey courthouse building with two one-storey wings	
War Memorial and Peace Garden	Category 2	Peel Street & Beaumont Highway, Lawrence	1924–1925	1992	5183	A concrete monument designed by Leslie D. Coombs in 1924–1925. It features a cupola sheltering an obelisk listing the names of local soldiers who died in service during the Second Boer War and the First World War, as well as some from the Second World War who were later added to the monument.	A white monument sheltering a black inscribed obelisk	
Clifton Homestead	Category 1	316 Waiwera Farms Road, Clifton	1917–1919	1990	5181	One of the largest homesteads in Otago, containing thirty-three rooms and a main hall measuring 32 m (105 ft) in length. It was designed by Edmund Anscombe for sheep farmer William Telford Jr.		
Balclutha Bridge	Category 1	State Highway 1, Balclutha	1933–1935	1990	5180	A reinforced six-span concrete tied-arch bridge crossing the Clutha River, with a total length of 244 m (800 ft). It was designed by William Newnham and opened in 1935.	A grey bridge spanning a river with many semicircular arcs	
McSkimming Hoffman Kiln	Category 1	Benhar Road, Benhar	c. 1894	1990	5179	The only Hoffmann kiln in New Zealand to retain its chimney and original appearance. The brickworks were closed after a major fire in 1990. A demolition of the kiln's chimney was halted by locals, and later protected by a heritage order.		
Willowmeade Homestead	Category 1	22 Willowmeade Road, Puerua	1858	1990	5178	A homestead built in 1858 for British army officer John Richardson. Largely unaltered, it was sold in 1875 to pay off debts incurred by his son in Fiji.		
Gregg and Co. Chicory Kiln (former)	Category 2	Chicory Road, Inch Clutha	1881	1990	3359	A three-storey concrete kiln designed by Mason & Wales which processed chicory for use by a number of New Zealand coffee businesses, most notably Gregg's.		
Clarendon Tollhouse (former)	Category 2	47 Waihola Highway, Helensbrook	1863	2011	3212	A small timber and iron tollhouse initially built in Waihola in 1863. It was moved to Clarendon in 1876, and later to Helensbrook (between Milburn and Milton), where it was used as a residence. It was restored by a locally formed trust.		
All Saints' Anglican Church (former)	Category 2	13 Forest Street and Kent Street, Tapanui	1878	2010	2363	An Anglican church designed in 1878 by prominent ecclesiastical architect Benjamin Mountfort. The congregation merged with another parish in 2007, and the church was repurposed as a gift shop by a new owner.		
Tokomairiro Church (Presbyterian)	Category 1	30 - 34 Union Street, Milton	1886–1889	2008	2250	A large stone church designed by Robert Lawson and opened in 1889. Its spire reaches a height of 32 m (105 ft). The local parish now includes both Methodist and Presbyterian churches; the Tokomairiro Church is used only occasionally, mainly for funerals.	A view of a street with a large church spire at the end	
Lodge St George (former)	Category 2	5 Colonsay Street, Lawrence	1878	2004	2249	A masonic lodge hall built in 1878, replacing the lodge's previous meeting room at a local hotel. With declining populations in the region, the lodge hall was sold in 1993. Ten years later, it was purchased by a heritage trust.		
St Patrick's Church School and Hall	Category 1	13 Colonsay Street, Lawrence	1871–1872	1990	2248	A large church school building designed by Robert Lawson and opened by Bishop Patrick Moran. It was used as both a church and school until the opening of the nearby St Patrick's Church twenty years later. In 1927, the school closed, and the building was converted to a community hall.	A two-storey wooden building with a rusty iron roof	
St Patrick's Church (Catholic)	Category 2	12 Colonsay Street and Lancaster Street, Lawrence	1891–1892	2010	2247	A timber and brick church designed by Francis Petre and opened in 1892. It replaced the first Catholic church in Otago, a corrugated iron building on the same plot. Falling into some disrepair, a fundraising programme in the 1990s helped restore the building.	A large white catholic church building with a gray roof	
Holy Trinity Anglican Church Bell Tower	Category 2	9 Whitehaven Street, Lawrence	1890s	2010	2245	A freestanding wooden bell tower constructed in the 1890s. It was retained when the nearby church was demolished and rebuilt in the 1920s.		
Lawrence Post Office (former)	Category 2	2 Colonsay Street and Peel Street, Lawrence	1866	2004	2244	An Italianate structure designed by Robert Lawson. It was initially used as a warden's court, but was converted to a post office in 1877. The post office vacated the premise and moved locations in 1973. The old building has since been largely unoccupied.	A grey one-storey post office	
Lawrence Presbyterian Church (former)	Category 2	7 Colonsay Street, Lawrence	1886	2004	2243	A large church, initially with red brick, designed by Robert Lawson. The congregation sold the church in 1994, and it was converted into a private residence. Extensive repairs were made after an arson attack in 1998.	A white church with a tall spire	
Anthem House	Category 2	17 Lawrence Street, Lawrence	1902	2004	2242	A residence built and originally occupied by John Joseph Woods, the composer of the national anthem God Defend New Zealand.		
Telford Farm Training Institute Administration Block	Category 1	498 Owaka Highway, Otanomomo	1869	1990	2127	A Georgian-style stone house initially built for shepherd and landowner William Telford in 1869. In 1965 the property became the Telford Farm Training Institute. After a period in use as student and staff housing, it became an administrative building in 1970.		
Horseshoe Bush Estate Site	Category 2	68 Driver Road, Clarendon	1860s	2011	2126	An archaeological site containing the remains of a mid-19th century homestead and two stables.		

== Former site ==
This site was formerly listed on the New Zealand Heritage List, but is no longer extant.

Former historic places in Clutha District
Name	Classification	Location	Constructed	Registered	List number	Notes	Image	Ref.
Building	Category 2	13 Ross Place, Lawrence	Before 1880	-	5211	A building built prior to the 1880s on land owned by Lawrence merchants Edward Herbert and Archibald McKinlay. It was demolished in the early 2000s due to health and safety concerns.		
