= Romahapa =

Coordinates: 46°21′S 169°44′E

Romahapa is a locality in the Catlins region of Otago in New Zealand's South Island. It is located between the towns of Balclutha and Owaka. The last shop closed in 1977.

== Education ==
Romahapa has a small primary school, named Romahapa School. It was established in 1856 and is one of the oldest schools in South Otago. In mid-October 2006, it celebrated its 150th anniversary.

== Railway ==
On 15 December 1885, a branch line railway (the Catlins Branch Line) from the Main South Line in Balclutha was opened to Romahapa. The village became a railway terminus for a few years and a number of bush tramways also operated in the area during the 1890s. Romahapa lost its terminal status on 7 July 1891 when an extension opened to Glenomaru. The railway line came to be known as the Catlins River Branch and ultimately terminated in Tahakopa; it serviced Romahapa until its closure on 27 February 1971. In the early 1900s, up to sixteen trains ran through Romahapa a week; these were predominantly mixed trains. Today, the Romahapa station's goods shed remains in its old location, while the station building has been resited a few kilometres away, and the wooden railway bridge over the Romahapa Creek still stands.

== Notable people ==
- Liz Craig
