= Tahora =

The place name Tahora may refer to:

- Tahora, Bay of Plenty, a locality within Whakatāne District in Bay of Plenty Region, New Zealand
- Tahora, Manawatū-Whanganui, a settlement within Stratford District in Manawatū-Whanganui Region, New Zealand
- Tahora, Otago, a locality within Clutha District in Otago Region, New Zealand
