= Finegand, New Zealand =

Coordinates: 46°16′S 169°44′E

Finegand is a locality in the South Otago region of New Zealand's South Island.

Named after Finegand, in Scotland, by John Shaw. John Shaw arrived in New Zealand in 1852, with his sister Margaret, from Finegand which is near Glenshee in Perthshire, Scotland. He took up land on the south bank of the Clutha River, and named his farm "Finegand".

Finegand is situated on the Clutha River south of Balclutha. Other nearby settlements include Otanomomo and Waitepeka to the south and Kakapuaka to the northwest.

== Economy ==
Finegand is located in a rural area and thus the economic emphasis is on agriculture. A major freezing works operated by Silver Fern Farms is located in Finegand. A multimillion-dollar upgrade of the facility was undertaken in 2007.

== Transport ==
Finegand is situated on the Southern Scenic Route road, which meets State Highway 1 just to the north in Balclutha.

On 15 December 1885, the first section of the Catlins River Branch railway opened through Finegand. This branch line ultimately terminated in Tahakopa, with the Finegand station 3.6 km from the junction with the Main South Line in Balclutha. At its peak in the first half of the 20th century, up to sixteen trains per week would pass through Finegand, primarily mixed trains. However, the line's profitability declined after World War II and it closed beyond Finegand on 27 February 1971. The first 4.05 km remain in operation as an industrial siding to serve the Silver Firm Farms freezing works and it is shunted as required by passing trains on the Main South Line.
