= Caberfeidh, New Zealand =

Coordinates: 46°31′S 169°29′E

The small settlement of Caberfeidh is located in The Catlins, in the Otago region of New Zealand's South Island. The site of a former railway station on the (now removed) Catlins Branch Line, it is sited close to a tributary of the Maclennan River, 5 kilometres north of the coast at Tahakopa Bay and 12 kilometres southwest of Owaka.

The settlement's name is from the motto of the Seaforth Highlanders, and is Scots Gaelic for a stag's antlers. It may have been given to the area by Sir Thomas Mackenzie.
