= Wreck of the Surat =

1874 shipwreck in New Zealand

Coordinates: 46°28′40″S 169°44′30″E

The three-masted ship Surat wrecked on New Year's Day 1874. It was a major event in the early history of New Zealand's Otago Region.

The Surat, a 1,000 ton iron vessel, was under charter to the New Zealand Shipping Company and was carrying emigrants and their belongings from Gravesend, England to Dunedin, New Zealand. She left Gravesend on 28 September 1873, with a crew of 37 under the command of Captain Johnson, carrying 271 passengers and 980 tons of cargo, among it railway iron and equipment for a woollen factory. It was not the Surat's first trip to New Zealand; she had previously carried British emigrants several occasions since the mid 1860s.

== Wreck in the Catlins ==
The majority of the voyage was uneventful, and the ship rounded the southern end of New Zealand's South Island on the last day of the year. At just before 10 p.m., under the command of her second mate, the ship hit a rock, raking her hull before drifting clear. The exact location of this incident is unknown, but it was certainly along the southern part of the Catlins coast, and probably close to Chasland's Mistake. A check at the time found that the hull was sound and there was no leak. During the night, however, a weakened section of hull broke through, and the pumps had to be manned.

At daylight, the steamer Wanganui was sighted and offered help, but Captain Johnson — according to many accounts in a state of heavy intoxication — made it clear in no uncertain terms that help was not needed. Several of the passengers protested and attempted to contact the Wanganui, but Johnson produced a revolver and threatened to shoot anyone defying his command. The captain did respond in part to the passengers' fears, anchoring the ship in Jack's Bay and allowing passengers to land. About half the passengers were landed before it was discovered that the ship was in danger of foundering. At this point, the anchor was raised and the Surat continued north to the mouth of the Catlins River, where she was deliberately beached in the sandy bay now called Surat Bay and formerly known as Forsyth's Bay. All the remaining passengers and crew landed safely, with the help of the Port Molyneux harbourmaster, Captain C. E. Hayward,

== Aftermath ==
Once news of the wreck reached Dunedin, the harbourmaster at the city's port, Port Chalmers, enlisted the help of a French warship, the Vire, which was anchored at the port. Under the command of its captain, Jacquemart, the ship travelled south to the scene of the wreck. With the help of the steamer Wallabi (or Wallabie), which had arrived from Bluff, the Surat's passengers were safely delivered to Dunedin.

All of the emigrants' belongings were left in the watery hulk, as was the ship's other cargo. The ship's wreck — including its cargo — was later sold at auction, but by that time, the settlers' possessions were damaged beyond repair, and they had to rely on an emergency fund set up by the residents of Dunedin. The ship's carved figurehead later became the property of Dunedin's Toitu Otago Settlers Museum.

The inquiry into the wreck held that Captain Johnson and his officers were accountable for the wreck. Both the Captain and second mate had their certificates cancelled, and Johnson was further sentenced to two months' imprisonment.
