= List of shipwrecks in January 1874 =

The list of shipwrecks in January 1874 includes ships sunk, foundered, grounded, or otherwise lost during January 1874.

== 1 January ==
List of shipwrecks: 1 January 1874
Ship	State	Description
Ellen Constance	United Kingdom	Cantonal Rebellion: The steamship was rammed and sunk by the armoured frigate Vitoria (Spanish Navy) at Cartagena, Canton of Cartagena, with the loss of three of her 22 crew.
Emanuel Aimee	United Kingdom	The ship ran around off Seven Fathoms Point, Africa.
Iron Cross	United Kingdom	The ship was wrecked at Clogherhead, County Louth. Her 34 crew were rescued. She was on a voyage from Liverpool, Lancashire to New Orleans, Louisiana, United States.
Laurel	United Kingdom	The steamship was beached on Rutland Island, County Donegal. She was on a voyage from Glasgow, Renfrewshire to Ballina, County Mayo.
Marley Hill	United Kingdom	The steamship was driven ashore at Whitehaven, Cumberland. Her crew were rescued. She was on a voyage from Liverpool to Whitehaven. She had become a wreck by 5 January.
Memphis	Norway	The barque ran aground at Waterford, United Kingdom and was severely damaged.
Surat	New Zealand	The 1,000-ton three-masted ship foundered at Surat Bay (formerly Forsyth's Bay) on New Zealand's Catlins coast. She was carrying 271 passengers and 37 crew, all of whom survived.
Union	United Kingdom	The steamboat ran aground and sank in the River Tay. Her three crew survived. She was on a voyage from Newburgh, Fife to Dundee, Forfarshire.
Western Light	United States	The schooner was lost off the coast of Maine. Crew saved.

== 2 January ==
List of shipwrecks: 2 January 1874
Ship	State	Description
Anne	United Kingdom	The ship was destroyed by fire at Rock Ferry, Cheshire. She was on a voyage from Garston, Lancashire to Londonderry.
Bloomer	United Kingdom	The brig was abandoned in the Atlantic Ocean. Her crew were rescued by the barque Marie Gabrielle (France). Bloomer subsequently sank. She was on a voyage from Pernambuco, Brazil to Queenstown, County Cork.
Exampler	United Kingdom	The brig ran aground in Liverpool Bay. She was on a voyage from Wilmington, Delaware, United States to Liverpool, Lancashire. She was refloated on 6 January and towed in to Liverpool.
Jessie Oscar	France	The sloop was driven ashore 2 nautical miles (3.7 km) east of Rye Harbour, Sussex, United Kingdom.
John Walton	United Kingdom	The ship collided with Scotia (United Kingdom) and was abandoned off Bridlington, Yorkshire. Her crew were rescued. John Walton was on a voyage from Hartlepool, County Durham to Lowestoft, Suffolk.
Mary Angele	United Kingdom	The schooner was driven ashore at Donaghmore.
Roxana	United Kingdom	The steamship struck the boom at Penarth, Glamorgan and was holed. She was on a voyage from Cardiff, Glamorgan to Malta. She was consequently beached.
Stephensons	United Kingdom	The steamship ran aground on "Ras Arak". She was on a voyage from Cardiff to Bombay, India. She was refloated and taken in to Aden.
Two Friends	United Kingdom	The ship was sighted off Cromer, Norfolk in a leaky condition and making for Great Yarmouth. No further trace, presumed foundered with the loss of all hands. She was on a voyage from London to Middlesbrough, Yorkshire.
Unnamed	Flag unknown	The ship was driven ashore between Beaufort and Wilmington, North Carolina, United States.

== 3 January ==
List of shipwrecks: 3 January 1874
Ship	State	Description
Davila	Spain	The steamship was wrecked at Pasajes. Her crew were rescued.
Fairy Queen	United Kingdom	The ferry collided with a steamship in the River Mersey and was severely damaged.
John and Mary	United Kingdom	The sloop foundered in the English Channel off Cap La Hougue, Seine-Inférieure, France with the loss of all but her captain.
Mary Jane	United Kingdom	The ship ran aground in the Elbe. She was on a voyage from Hamburg, Germany to Runcorn, Cheshire.
Queen of Devon	United Kingdom	The ship ran aground on the Haisborough Sands, in the North Sea off the coast of Norfolk. She was on a voyage from Hamburg to Plymouth, Devon. She was refloated and taken in to Grimsby, Lincolnshire in a leaky condition.
Tom Bell	United Kingdom	The steamship collided with the barque Famenegilda Danevaro (Italy) at Cardiff, Glamorgan and was beached. Tom Bell was on a voyage from Cardiff to Alicante, Spain.
Western Ocean	United Kingdom	The ship departed from Pensacola, Florida, United States for Newcastle upon Tyne, Northumberland. No further trace, presumed foundered with the loss of all hands.

== 4 January ==
List of shipwrecks: 4 January 1874
Ship	State	Description
George	United Kingdom	The Thames barge collided with the steamship Dagmar (Denmark) and sank in the River Thames at Blackwall, Middlesex.
River Krishna	United Kingdom	The full-rigged ship ran aground on the South Rock, off the Tuskar Rock and was wrecked. Her 25 crew were rescued by St. Nicolas (United Kingdom). She was on a voyage from San Francisco, California, United States to Liverpool, Lancashire.

== 5 January ==
List of shipwrecks: 5 January 1874
Ship	State	Description
Clio	United Kingdom	The barque was driven ashore near Ystad, Sweden. Her crew were rescued. She was on a voyage from Karlskrona to Gothenburg, Sweden.
Ormsby	United Kingdom	The steamship foundered in the Bay of Biscay with the loss of sixteen of her 26 crew. Survivors were rescued by the steamship Aletha (United Kingdom). Ormsby was on a voyage from Cardiff, Glamorgan to Constantinople, Ottoman Empire.
Try Again	United Kingdom	The ship was abandoned in the Atlantic Ocean. Her crew were rescued. She was on a voyage from Cardiff to Paysandú, Uruguay.

== 6 January ==
List of shipwrecks: 6 January 1874
Ship	State	Description
Anna and Margaretha	Netherlands	The sschooner was abandoned off the Leman and Ower Sandbank, in the North Sea. Her crew were rescued by a German steamship. She was on a voyage from Hamburg, Germany to Lisbon, Portugal.
Duchess of Sutherland	United Kingdom	The barque was abandoned at sea. Her crew were rescued by the steamship Oresund. (Germany). Duchess of Sutherland was on a voyage from Cuxhaven, Germany to Cardiff, Glamorgan.

== 7 January ==
List of shipwrecks: 7 January 1874
Ship	State	Description
Alarm	United Kingdom	The schooner collided with Protector do Reino (Portugal) and sank in Morte Bay. Her crew were rescued by Protector do Reino.
Dagupan	Flag unknown	The steamship ran aground off Masbate Island, Spanish East Indies.
Glide	United Kingdom	The schooner ran aground. She was on a voyage from Königsberg, Germany to a Norwegian port. She was refloated and put in to Mollösund.
Heroine	United Kingdom	The schooner collided with the barque Laguna (France) and foundered in the Irish Sea off Point Lynas, Anglesey with the loss of three of her five crew. Survivors were rescued by the pilot boat No. 7 (United Kingdom). Heroine was on a voyage from Workington, Cumberland to London.
Neva	United Kingdom	The brig ran aground in the River Itchen.

== 8 January ==
List of shipwrecks: 8 January 1874
Ship	State	Description
Mary	United Kingdom	The brig ran aground at Anholt, Denmark. She was on a voyage from Gothenborg, Sweden to a British port.
Sherman	United States	The steamship sprang a leak and was beached at Little River, South Carolina. All on boardn were rescued. She was on a voyage from New York to New Orleans, Louisiana.
Tamerlane	United Kingdom	The ship ran aground on the Alceste Reef, in the Gaspar Strait. She was on a voyage from Yokohama, Japan to New York, United States. She had been refloated by 22 January and was subsequently taken in to Batavia, Netherlands East Indies and placed under repair.

== 9 January ==
List of shipwrecks: 9 January 1874
Ship	State	Description
Aurelia	United States	The ship departed from Baltimore, Maryland for Queenstown, County Cork, United Kingdom. No further trace, presumed foundered with the loss of all hands.
Calumet	United States	The ship struck rocks and sank at Bermuda.
Mary	United Kingdom	The smack foundered in the North Sea off the coast of Lincolnshire. Five of her ten crew were rescued by the Theddlethorpe Lifeboat, the others reached shore in their boat.
Ravensworth Castle	United Kingdom	The steamship ran aground and was wrecked on Lindisfarne, Northumberland. Her 42 crew survived. She was on a voyage from Baltimore, Maryland to Leith, Lothian.
Sherman	United States	The steamer sprang a leak and sank off Cape Fear, North Carolina.

== 10 January ==
List of shipwrecks: 10 January 1874
Ship	State	Description
E. H. Oakes	United Kingdom	The brig was driven ashore and wrecked on Faial Island, Azores with the loss of two of her crew. She was on a voyage from Halifax, Nova Scotia, Canada to Ayr.
Hesperus	United Kingdom	The steamship ran aground on the Maplin Sand, in the North Sea off the coast of Essex. She was refloated and resumed her voyage.

== 11 January ==
List of shipwrecks: 11 January 1874
Ship	State	Description
Barao de Tifle	United States	The paddle steamer foundered in the Gulf of Florida. Her crew were rescued by Fairwind (United Kingdom). Baras de Tifle was on a voyage from Philadelphia, Pennsylvania to Pará, Brazil.
Canute	United Kingdom	The steamship ran aground at Alexandria, Egypt. She was on a voyage from Alexandria to London. She was refloated and put back to Alexandria in a leaky condition.
Dolphin	Netherlands	The steamship was driven ashore on Ameland, Friesland. Her crew were rescued. She was on a voyage from Liepāja, Russia to Rotterdam, South Holland. She was refloated and resumed her voyage, but later sank near Rotterdam.
Earl of Aberdeen	United Kingdom	The steamship ran aground on the Paardenmarkt, off the Dutch coast. She was on a voyage from Antwerp, Belgium to London.
Europa	United Kingdom	The schooner collided with the full-rigged ship Western Empire (United Kingdom) and sank in the English Channel off Dungeness, Kent. Her crew were rescued by Western Empire. Europa was on a voyage from London to Topsham, Devon.
Panther	United States	The ship was wrecked off Tilly Point with the loss of at least 23 lives. She was on a voyage from Nanaimo, British Columbia, Canada to San Francisco, California.
Shamrock	United Kingdom	The schooner was wrecked on the Dog's Head Sand, in The Wash. Her crew were rescued.

== 12 January ==
List of shipwrecks: 12 January 1874
Ship	State	Description
Brothers	United Kingdom	The schooner was driven ashore at Stranraer, Wigtownshire. She was on a voyage from Troon, Ayrshire to Belfast, County Antrim. She was refloated.
Jane	United Kingdom	The ship was abandoned off Scrabster, Caithness. She was on a voyage from Ardrossan, Ayrshire to Wick, Caithness. She was subsequently taken in to Scrabster.
John Fenwick	United Kingdom	The steamship was driven ashore and wrecked on Terschelling, Friesland, Netherlands with the loss of nine of her 22 crew. Survivors were rescued by the smack Martha (Netherlands). John Fenwick was on a voyage from Nicolaieff, Russia to Hamburg, Germany.
Lizzie English	United Kingdom	The steamship was driven ashore at Holkham, Norfolk. She was on a voyage from Hartlepool, County Durham to Gibraltar. She was refloated on 14 January and resumed her voyage.
Lizzy	United Kingdom	The ship was sighted off Cape Rizutto, Italy whilst on a voyage from Naples, Italy to Gallipoli, Ottoman Empire. No further trace, presumed foundered with the loss of all hands.
Zubaran	Spain	The steamship was driven ashore at Blyth, Northumberland, United Kingdom.

== 13 January ==
List of shipwrecks: 13 January 1874
Ship	State	Description
Intrepid	United Kingdom	The ship was towed in to Granton, Lothian in a sinking condition and was beached. She was on a voyage from Hamburg to Aberdeen.
Johanna Elizabeth	Netherlands	The ship caught fire at Penang, Malaya and was scuttled.
Valetta	United Kingdom	The barque was driven ashore and wrecked at Monster, South Holland. She was on a voyage from Kronstadt, Russia to Antwerp, Belgium.

== 14 January ==
List of shipwrecks: 14 January 1874
Ship	State	Description
Isabella	France	The schooner was driven ashore and wrecked at Emmanuel Head, Lindisfarne, Northumberland, United Kingdom with the loss of a crew member.
James Southern	United Kingdom	The steamship was driven ashore at South Shields, County Durham. She was refloated.
Jennett Evans	United Kingdom	The schooner was driven ashore in Shoreness Bay. She was on a voyage from Hamburg, Germany to Glasson Dock, Lancashire.
Unnamed	Flag unknown	The steamship ran aground on the Brouwerplatte, in the North Sea off the German coast, and sank.

== 15 January ==
List of shipwrecks: 15 January 1874
Ship	State	Description
Amelia	United Kingdom	The steamship collided with the steamship Annie Ainslie (United Kingdom) and sank in Lake Timsah. She was later refloated and taken in to Suez, Egypt for repairs.
Calcutta	United Kingdom	The ship was driven ashore at Kilmore, in Ballyteigue Bay. She was on a voyage from Surinam to Liverpool, Lancashire. She became a wreck on 20 January.

== 16 January ==
List of shipwrecks: 16 January 1874
Ship	State	Description
Haydn, and Vera	Germany; Denmark	The barque Haydn and the steamship Vera collided in the English Channel 35 nautical miles (65 km) off Portland, Dorset, United Kingdom. Haydn was abandoned with the loss of a crew member. Survivors were rescued by Vera. Haydn was on a voyage from Hamburg to Bahia, Brazil. She came ashore at The Needles, Isle of Wight, United Kingdom and was wrecked. Vera later sank. All on board were rescued by the full-rigged ship Marchmont (United Kingdom). Vera was on a voyage from Messina, Sicily, Italy to Helsinki, Grand Duchy of Finland.
Lady Franklin, and Sparta	United Kingdom	The brigantines collided off Pladda, in the Firth of Clyde. Both vessels were abandoned by their crews. Lady Franklin was on a voyage from Troon to an Irish port. A tugboat was sent out to search for the vessels, but found no trace. They were presumed to have foundered.
Montezuma	France	The steamship ran aground at Montevideo, Uruguay. She was refloated on 18 January and taken in to Montevideo.
Rainbow	United Kingdom	The fishing smack was run into by the steamship Meteor (United Kingdom) and sank at the mouth of the River Liffey. Two of her five crew were drowned. Survivors were rescued by the Meteor.
Relief	United States	The steamship struc an uncharted rock and was wrecked near Hirado, Japan. All on board were rescued. She was on a voyage from Yokohama, Japan to Shanghai, China.

== 17 January ==
List of shipwrecks: 17 January 1874
Ship	State	Description
Charles Edwin	United Kingdom	The schooner was run down and sunk by a barque off Dungeness, Kent. Her crew were rescued by the barque William Frederick (United Kingdom). Charles Edwin was on a voyage from London to Amlwch, Anglesey.
Judith	United Kingdom	The schooner was damaged by fire at Fraserburgh, Aberdeenshire.
Neptune	United Kingdom	The steamship ran aground at Workington, Cumberland. She was on a voyage from Glasgow, Renfrewshire to Workington. She was refloated and taken in to Workington.
Panther	United States	The medium clipper ran aground off Vancouver Island, British Columbia, Canada and was wrecked. Her crew survived. She was on a voyage from Nanaimo, British Columbia to San Francisco, California.
Surf	United Kingdom	The schooner collided with the brig Istria (Austria-Hungary) and sank off Ailsa Craig with the loss of a crew member. Survivors were rescued by Istria.

== 18 January ==
List of shipwrecks: 18 January 1874
Ship	State	Description
Adam White, and Harvest Maid	United Kingdom	The schooners collided at Campbeltown, Argyllshire. Adam White was severely damaged. Harvest Maid was beached.
Æolus	United Kingdom	The schooner was driven ashore and wrecked at Clarendon Head, Caithness. Her six crew were rescued by the Coastguard using rocket apparatus. She was on a voyage from Thurso, Caithness to Alloa, Clackmannanshire.
Bruce	United Kingdom	The ship was driven ashore at Helensburgh, Dunbartonshire. She was on a voyage from Greenock, Renfrewshire to Pensacola, Florida, United States.
Celtic	United Kingdom	The steamship struck sunken wreckage and damaged her propeller. She was on a voyage from Queenstown, County Cork to New York. She was towed back to Queenston by SS Gaelic (1872).
Farnham	United Kingdom	The brig was driven ashore and wrecked on Holy Isle, in the Firth of Clyde. Her crew were rescued.
Georg Wilhelm	Russia	The ship was driven ashore and wrecked at Lista, Norway. Her crew were rescued.
Ida	United Kingdom	The barque was driven ashore on Holy Isle. Her crew were rescued. She was refloated on 20 January.
I'll Try	United Kingdom	The schooner was driven ashore at Campbeltown.
Jessie	United Kingdom	The ship ran aground on the Newcombe Sand, in the North Sea off the coast of Suffolk and foundered. Her six crew were rescued by the Kessingland Lifeboat Bolton ( Royal National Lifeboat Institution). Jessie was on a voyage from Blyth, Northumberland to Calais, France.
Loch Ard	United Kingdom	The ship broke from her moorings in the Clyde upstream of Helensburgh. She collided with a Customs cutter and two schooners. All on board were taken off by a steamship. Loch Ard was on a voyage from Glasgow, Renfrewshire to Melbourne, Victoria. She was refloated. She had been refloated by 27 January, resuming her voyage on that day.
Minnehaha	United Kingdom	The barque was wrecked off Peninnis Head, Isles of Scilly with the loss of ten of the nineteen people on board. She was on a voyage from Callao, Peru to Dublin.
Unnamed	United Kingdom	The brig was driven ashore near Lamlash. Isle of Arran.
Unnamed	United Kingdom	The ships were driven ashore on Holy Isle.
Two unnamed vessels	United Kingdom	The schooners were driven ashore at Campbeltown. One of them was refloated.

== 19 January ==
List of shipwrecks: 19 January 1874
Ship	State	Description
Dryad	United Kingdom	The brig was driven ashore in Roeia Bay, Spain. She was on a voyage from Liverpool, Lancashire to Gibraltar. She was refloated.
Essex	United Kingdom	The brig was abandoned off Banff, Aberdeenshire. Her six crew were rescued by the Banff Lifeboat John and Sarah ( Royal National Lifeboat Institution). Essex subsequently came ashore in Banff Bay.
Jeanne and Joseph	United Kingdom	The ship was driven ashore near Crosby, Lancashire. She was on a voyage from Lisbon, Portugal to Liverpool, Lancashire. She was refloated and taken in to Liverpool in a leaky condition.
Killarney	United Kingdom	The steamship was driven ashore at Terneuzen, Zeeland, Netherlands, caught fire and was severely damaged. She was on a voyage from Goole, Yorkshire to Ghent, East Flanders, Belgium. She was refloated in early February and taken in to "Oostkolk" for temporary repairs.
Linda Flor	United Kingdom	The ship was abandoned off Peterhead, Aberdeenshire.
Mary	United Kingdom	The barque Mary collided off the barque Witness (United Kingdom) off Deal, Kent and foundered. Mary was on a voyage from London to Tobago.
Melbourne	United Kingdom	The full-rigged ship caught fire in the Indian Ocean and was abandoned by her crew. She was on a voyage from Calcutta, India to Dundee, Forfarshire.

== 20 January ==
List of shipwrecks: 20 January 1874
Ship	State	Description
Criterion	United Kingdom	The steamship ran aground off Smyrna, Ottoman Empire. She was refloated on 26 January and taken in to Smyrna.
Dinnington	United Kingdom	The ship ran aground near Goole, Yorkshire. She was on a voyage from Goole to Boulogne, Pas-de-Calais, France. She was refloated and put back to Goole.
Scottish Bride	Canada	The barque was abandoned in the Atlantic Ocean. Her crew were rescued by the barque Parodi C. (Italy). Scottish Bride was on a voyage from New York, United States to Málaga, Spain.

== 21 January ==
List of shipwrecks: 21 January 1874
Ship	State	Description
Elizabeth Hamilton	United States	The ship collided with George (United Kingdom) and ran aground at St. George's, Bermuda. She was on a voyage from St. George's to New York.
Frieda	United Kingdom	The steamship ran aground near Garston, Lancashire. She was on a voyage from Drogheda, County Louth to Runcorn, Cheshire.
Northumberland	United Kingdom	The brig was driven ashore near Blyth, Northumberland.
Paragon	(United Kingdom of Great Britain and Ireland) Guernsey	The barque was driven ashore at "Itapoan", Brazil and was wrecked.

== 22 January ==
List of shipwrecks: 22 January 1874
Ship	State	Description
Bernhard	Germany	The ship departed from Lagos, Lagos Colony for Aarhus, Denmark. No further trace, presumed foundered with the loss of all hands.
Diamantina	New South Wales	The steamship struck rocks and was beached at Port Macquarie. She was repaired and refloated.
Ensign	United Kingdom	The brig struck a reef off the Isla de Juventud, Cuba and was abandoned. Her crew were rescued She was on a voyage from Jamaica to Glasgow, Renfrewshire.
Golden Plover	United Kingdom	The barque was driven ashore near Dunkirk, Nord. She was on a voyage from Suez, Egypt to Dunkirk. She was later refloated and towed in to Dunkirk.
Liffey	United Kingdom	The brigantine ran aground on the Salisbury Bank, in Liverpool Bay. She was on a voyage from Liverpool, Lancashire to Dublin.
Netherton	United Kingdom	The steamship was driven ashore near Cap Gris Nez, Pas-de-Calais, France and sank. Her crew were rescued. She was on a voyage from Newcastle upon Tyne, Northumberland to Calais, France.

== 23 January ==
List of shipwrecks: 23 January 1874
Ship	State	Description
Alexander Lavally	France	The steamship was driven ashore on Long Island, New York, United States. She was on a voyage from London, United Kingdom to New York City, United States
Rose	Spain	The steamship was driven ashore on Heligoland. She was on a voyage from New Orleans, Louisiana, United States to Bremen, Germany. She was refloated and resumed her voyage in a leaky condition.
Ville de La Rochelle	France	The steamship was driven ashore at Antwerp, Belgium. She was on a voyage from Pomaron (aka Pomarão), Portugal to Antwerp. She was refloated and found to be severely damaged.

== 24 January ==
List of shipwrecks: 24 January 1874
Ship	State	Description
Endymion	United Kingdom	The ship ran aground on the Burbo Bank, in Liverpool Bay. She was on a voyage from New Orleans, Louisiana, United States to Liverpool, Lancashire. She was refloated and towed in to Liverpool.
Jane	United Kingdom	The brig ran aground on the East Knock Sand, in the Thames Estuary. She was on a voyage from Sunderland, County Durham to London. She was refloated with assistance.
Lochnagar	United Kingdom	The ship sank at Fraserburgh, Aberdeenshire.
Paradox	United Kingdom	The steamship ran aground at Southend, Essex. She was on a voyage from Goole, Yorkshire to London. She was refloated and resumed her voyage.
Victor	United States	The ship was driven ashore at Smith's Point, New York.

== 25 January ==
List of shipwrecks: 25 January 1874
Ship	State	Description
Harriet	United Kingdom	The sloop collided with the steamship Tanjore (United Kingdom) and sank in the River Thames. Her crew were rescued.
Ituna	United Kingdom	The ship was abandoned in the Atlantic Ocean. Her crew were rescued by the steamship Excelsior (United Kingdom). Ituna was on a voyage from Darien, Georgia, United States to Whitehaven, Cumberland.
Olivia	United Kingdom	The schooner was wrecked in the Farne Islands, Northumberland. Her crew survived.

== 26 January ==
List of shipwrecks: 26 January 1874
Ship	State	Description
Jane Jackson	United Kingdom	The schooner ran aground on the Sow and Pigs Rocks, off the coast of Northumberland. She was on a voyage from Hull, Yorkshire to Grangemouth, Stirlingshire. She was refloated and taken in to Blyth, Northumberland.
Kathleen	Canada	The barque collided with Mallowdale (United Kingdom) in the English Channel off Hastings, Sussex, United Kingdom and was abandoned by her crew, who were rescued by Mallowdale. Kathleen was on a voyage from New Orleans, Louisiana, United States to Bremen, Germany. She was subsequently beached at Dover, Kent.
Marco Polo	United Kingdom	The ship ran aground off Theddlethorpe, Lincolnshire. She was on a voyage from Wisbech, Cambridgeshire to Stockholm, Sweden. She was refloated and taken in to Grimsby, Lincolnshire in a leaky condition.
Margaret Ridley	United Kingdom	The brig foundered in the Mediterranean Sea east of Malta with the loss of all but one of her crew. The survivor was rescued by a Greek brig. She was on a voyage from Harbour Grace, Nova Scotia, Canada to Constantinople, Ottoman Empire.
Stjorn	Norway	The brig was driven ashore at Jérémie, Haiti. She was consequently condemned.
St. Louis	Norway	The ship was driven ashore at Strömstad, Sweden. She was on a voyage from Christiania to Hull.
Superb	Russia	The brig was driven ashore at Vlissingen, Zeeland, Netherlands. She was on a voyage from Antwerp, Belgium to Rio de Janeiro, Brazil.
Vest	United Kingdom	The tug sank at Belfast, County Antrim.

== 27 January ==
List of shipwrecks: 27 January 1874
Ship	State	Description
J. H. Nicolai	Germany	The barque was abandoned at sea and was scuttled. Her crew were rescued by the steamship Severn (United Kingdom).
Seaflower	United Kingdom	The smack sprang a leak and foundered in the North Sea 10 nautical miles (19 km) east of Lowestoft, Suffolk. Her crew were rescued by the smack Eliza Louisa (United Kingdom).

== 28 January ==
List of shipwrecks: 28 January 1874
Ship	State	Description
Clifton Belle	United Kingdom	The ship departed from Pensacola, Florida, United States for Greenock, Renfrewshire. No further trace, presumed foundered with the loss of all hands.
Mohawk	United Kingdom	The ship departed from Pensacola for the Clyde. No further trace, presumed foundered with the loss of all hands.

== 29 January ==
List of shipwrecks: 29 January 1874
Ship	State	Description
Egyptien	France	The steamship was driven ashore at Livorno, Italy. She was on a voyage from Marseille, Bouches-du-Rhône to Livorno.
Eliza Augusta	United Kingdom	The schooner was driven ashore near Campbeltown, Argyllshire. She was on a voyage from Saint-Malo, Ille-et-Vilaine to Campbeltown.
James Paterson	Queensland	The steamship was driven ashore on Masthead Island. She was on a voyage from Maryborough to Sydney, New South Wales. She was later refloated and taken in to Gladstone
Jane Cory	United Kingdom	The steamship ran aground on the Maplin Sands, in the North Sea off the coast of Essex. She was on a voyage from West Hartlepool, County Durham to London.
Jane Ellen	United Kingdom	The smack foundered off Strumble Head, Pembrokeshire. Her crew survived .
Unnamed	United Kingdom	The schooner ran aground on the West Hoyle Bank, in Liverpool Bay. She was refloated and resumed her voyage.

== 30 January ==
List of shipwrecks: 30 January 1874
Ship	State	Description
'Glaucus	United States	The steamship caught fire at Boston, Massachusetts and was scuttled.

== 31 January ==
List of shipwrecks: 31 January 1874
Ship	State	Description
Ayos Stefanos	Greece	The ship was driven ashore and wrecked at "Carabournou", Ottoman Empire.
Louisa	United Kingdom	The schooner struck the Cross Sand, in the North Sea off the coast of Norfolk and sank. Her crew were rescued. She was on a voyage from Seaham, County Durham to Portsmouth, Hampshire.
Yarra	United Kingdom	The schooner was wrecked on Oyster Bank, near Newcastle, New South Wales. Due to a heavy gale she was returning to Newcastle after departing for Sydney.

== Unknown date ==
List of shipwrecks: Unknown date in January 1874
Ship	State	Description
A. D. Whidden	Canada	The brig was wrecked near Apple River, Nover Scotia with the loss of all hands. She was on a voyage from Kemp, Nova Scotia to Portland, Maine, United States.
Aeroliet Schaap	Netherlands	The ship was destroyed by fire at Surabaya, Netherlands East Indies.
Anetta	Russia	The brig was wrecked at Yevpatoria before 3 January.
Anna Coltjornsen	Flag unknown	The barque was abandoned in the Atlantic Ocean. Her eleven crew were rescued by Brisk (United Kingdom). Anna Coltjornsen was on a voyage from "Doboy" to Greenock, Renfrewshire, United Kingdom.
Axel	United Kingdom	The ship ran aground off Porkkalanniemi, Grand Duchy of Finland. She was on a voyage from Grimsby, Lincolnshire to "Dahlbruck". She was later refloated and taken in to Helsinki, Grand Duchy of Finland.
Cato	Germany	The ship was driven ashore at "Goranno". She was on a voyage from Genoa Italy to Montevideo, Uruguay.
Charger	United Kingdom	The ship was driven ashore and wrecked on the coast of "Zebu" on or before 3 January. Her crew were rescued.
Cheshire	United Kingdom	The ferry collided with a Mersey Flat and sank at Liverpool, Lancashire. She was refloated about a week later, repaired and returned to service.
China	United Kingdom	The ship ran aground at the mouth of the Goatzacoalcos River, Mexico before 8 January.
Christiania	Canada	The schooner was wrecked at Cape St. John, Newfoundland Colony. She was on a voyage from Pictou, Nova Scotia to Prince Edward Island.
Duchess	United Kingdom	The steamship was driven ashore near Campbeltown, Argyllshire. She was refloated.
Ernst August	Germany	The ship ran aground on the Mullet Platte, in the North Sea off the German coast before 5 January. She was on a voyage from Grangemouth, Stirlingshire, United Kingdom.
Felix	United Kingdom	The ship was abandoned at sea. Her crew were rescued.
Gem	United Kingdom	The ship was driven ashore at Cape Chateau Rouge, Newfoundland Colony. She was on a voyage from Barbados to Burin, Newfoundland Colony.
Gustavo	Italy	The ship was driven ashore and wrecked on the east coast of Crete.
Harlingen	Netherlands	The ship ran aground on the Grind. She was on a voyage from Harlingen, Friesland to Savannah, Georgia, United States. She was refloated with assistance.
Indian Empire	United Kingdom	The ship put in to Cochin, India on fire and was scuttled. She was on a voyage from the River Tyne to Calcutta, India. She had been refloated by 29 January.
Ingolf	Germany	The schooner ran aground on the Kusegen, in the Baltic Sea. She was on a voyage from Königsberg to Bristol, Gloucestershire, United Kingdom. She was refloated and taken in to Helsingør, denmark.
Johann	Germany	The ship was wrecked at Santo Domingo Tonalá, Mexico before 14 January.
John	United Kingdom	The barque was destroyed by fire at Bull Point, Falkland Islands. Her crew were rescued. She was on a voyage from Porthcawl, Glamorgan to Valparaíso, Chile.
John C.	United Kingdom	The brig was wrecked near Malamocco, Italy. Her crew were rescued.
John and Jennifer	United Kingdom	The schooner was abandoned in Holyhead Bay. Her five crew were rescued by the Holyhead Lifeboat. She was on a voyage from Barrow-in-Furness, Lancashire to Fowey, Cornwall.
Lapwing	United Kingdom	The barque was wrecked on the Shandong Peninsula (Shantung Promontory), China before 10 January. Her crew were rescued.
Liberia	United Kingdom	The steamship was driven ashore on the coast of the Gambia Colony and Protectorate.
Louise Clemens	United Kingdom	The ship was driven ashore at Penmon, Anglesey. She was on a voyage from Liverpool to Genoa. She was refloated on 22 January and taken in to Bangor, Caernarfonshire.
Marguerite	Germany	The steamship was wrecked off Husum. She was on a voyage from Hamburg to Havre de Grâce, Seine-Inférieure.
Maria Needham	United Kingdom	The ship was driven ashore and wrecked at Wilmington, Delaware, United States. he was on a voyage from Wilmington to Liverpool.
M. B. Almon	Canada	The barque was driven ashore and severely damaged at "Lescomb", Nova Scotia before January 13.
Melita	United Kingdom	The barque ran aground off Le Tréport, Seine-Inférieure. She was declared a total loss.
Mermaid	United Kingdom	The schooner was driven ashore on "Neira Island" before 27 January.
Osprey	United Kingdom	The barque was wrecked in "Beak Bay", Bahamas before 9 January. She was on a voyage from Havana, Cuba to Queenstown, County Cork.
Paolo Schiaffino	Italy	The barque was driven ashore and wrecked on Pico Island, Azores. She was on a voyage from New York, United States to Queenstown.
Pauline and Ermida	France	The brig ran aground and was wrecked at San Carlos. She was on a voyage from Marseille, Bouches-du-Rhône to San Carlos.
Polly	United Kingdom	The ship was abandoned in the Atlantic Ocean before 5 January. Her crew were rescued. She was on a voyage from Pensacola, Florida, United States to Liverpool.
Proteus	Germany	The brig was driven ashore. She was on a voyage from Hamburg to Puerto Cabello, Venezuela. She was refloated and taken in to Finkenwerder for repairs.
Red Jacket	United Kingdom	The schooner was wrecked at Cape Ras Herelash, on the north coast of Africa.
Saladin	United Kingdom	The ship was driven ashore at Yarmouth, Nova Scotia, Canada before 16 January. She was on a voyage from Saint John, New Brunswick, Canada to London. She was consequently condemned.
Savernake	United Kingdom	The steamship was wrecked near Falmouth, Cornwall with loss of life. She was on a voyage from Falmouth to London.
Saxon	United Kingdom	The ship was wrecked in the Orkney Islands or the Shetland Islands with the loss of all hands.
Segesta	Italy	The steamship was driven ashore on "Scies Island", Greece before 15 January. SHe was on a voyage from Marseille, Bouches-du-Rhône, France to Constantinople, Ottoman Empire. She was refloated and resumed her voyage.
St. Lucia	Spain	The barque collided with the steamship Buluan (Spain) at Manila, Spanish East Indies before 20 January and was beached.
Tamesa	United States	The ship was driven ashore in the Pearl River (Canton River). She was on a voyage from Pazhou (Whampoa), China to New York.
Tuapan	United Kingdom	The brig was driven ashore north of Helsingborg, Sweden. She was on a voyage from Grangemouth, Stirlingshire to Helsingborg.
Unido	Portugal	The brig foundered in the Atlantic Ocean before 15 January with the loss of all hands. She was on a voyage from Pernambuco, Brazil to Portugal.
Walhall	Sweden	The ship was wrecked on the Danish coast. Her crew were rescued.
Wick Lassies	United Kingdom	The schooner ran aground on the Mittelgrund. She was on a voyage from Danzig, Germany to West Hartlepool, County Durham. She was refloated and resumed her voyage, but put in to Arendal, Norway in a leaky condition.
William Jones	United Kingdom	The schooner was driven ashore at St. Margaret's Bay, Kent with the loss of a crew member. She was on a voyage from Great Yarmouth, Norfolk to Belfast, County Antrim. She was refloated and towed in to Dover, Kent.
Winona	United Kingdom	The ship was driven ashore before 8 January. She was on a voyage from New Orleans, Louisiana, United States to Liverpool. She was refloated and taken in to Key West, Florida, United States in a leaky condition.
Zarah	United Kingdom	The full-rigged ship was abandoned in the Atlantic Ocean. Her crew were rescued by the steamship Amerique (France). Zarah was on a voyage from Pensacola to Swansea, Glamorgan.
