= Otanomomo =

Locality in the South Otago region of New Zealand's South Island

Coordinates: 46°18′S 169°45′E

Otanomomo is a locality in the South Otago region of New Zealand's South Island. It is situated on the banks of the Koau Branch of the Clutha River, roughly six kilometres south of Balclutha. Nearby settlements include Finegand to the north, Paretai, Puerua, and Romahapa to the south, and Waitepeka to the west.

== Education ==
A polytechnic is located in Otanomomo. Named Telford Rural Polytechnic, it is based on land donated by the Telfords, an early pioneering family in the area.

== Environment ==
A 37 hectare reserve, Otanomomo Scientific Reserve, is located in the Otanomomo area. It protects the remnants of a larger podocarp coastal forest and a number of rare species of plants. In the early 2000s, the Department of Conservation and volunteers from community groups conducted a programme to eliminate weeds in the reserve and encourage the growth of native foliage.

Protective works along the banks of the Clutha River have also been undertaken. Works undertaken at the start of the 1920s led to special legislation to allow the Otanomomo River Board to pay back the costs to the Ministry of Works.

== Transport ==
Otanomomo is located on the Southern Scenic Route road, which joins State Highway 1 in Balclutha.

On 15 December 1885, the first section of the Catlins River Branch railway opened through Otanomomo. This branch line ultimately terminated in Tahakopa, with the Otanomomo station 6.46 km from the junction with the Main South Line in Balclutha. At its peak in the first half of the 20th century, up to sixteen trains per week would pass through Otanomomo, primarily mixed trains. However, the line's profitability declined after World War II and it closed on 27 February 1971. At the site of the former Otanomomo station, a loading bank remains in place, and the line's old formation can be seen in the surrounding area.
