= Glenomaru =

Locality in Clutha District, Otago Region, New Zealand

Coordinates: 46°23′S 169°41′E

Glenomaru is a small settlement in The Catlins, an area of the southern South Island of New Zealand. It is located 10 kilometres north of Owaka on the main road to Balclutha. On 7 July 1891, a branch line railway from the Main South Line in Balclutha was opened to Glenomaru, and the village remained the terminus of the line until it was extended to Tahora on 16 December 1895. This line ultimately terminated in Tahakopa and was known as the Catlins River Branch. It closed on 27 February 1971 and a sawmill now exists on the site of Glenomaru station, though some of the railway's old formation can be seen in the surrounding area and the Hunts Road tunnel is in the vicinity and can be walked.
