= Tahora, Otago =

Coordinates: 46°26′35″S 169°40′10″E

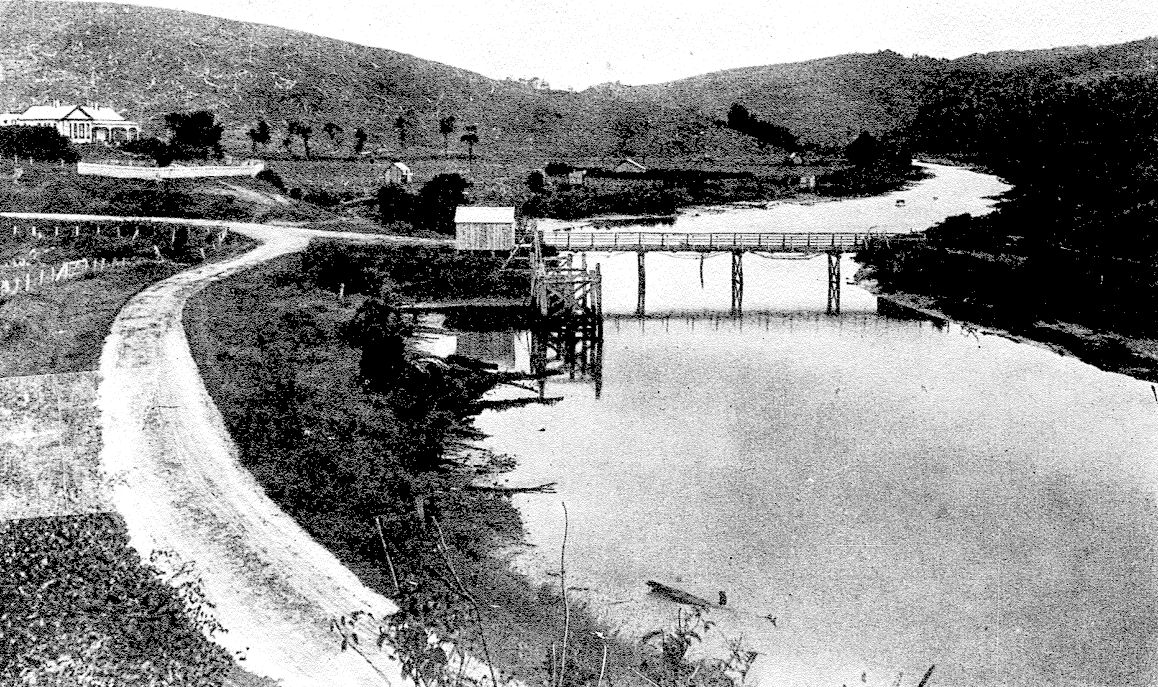
View along the Ōwaka River towards Tahora, 1916

Tahora, later also known as Parae, is a locality in the Otago region of New Zealand's South Island, about one kilometre north of Owaka located at the Ōwaka River. Previously on a railway line, Tahora was a request stop. Today, there is little trace of the settlement and only parts of the railway formation remains visible.

== Railway history ==
From 16 December 1895 until 27 February 1971, the village was served by the Catlins River Branch railway that diverged from the Main South Line in Balclutha. It acted as the railway's terminus for just over six months, from when the line from Glenomaru opened until another section to Owaka was added on 22 June 1896. Today, little remains of the railway besides the line's old formation, though nearby is the Hunts Road tunnel that can be walked.

The railway station was renamed Parae to avoid confusion with Tahora in North Island. This change took effect on 1 May 1916.
