= Jack's Bay =

Settlement in The Catlins, New Zealand

Coordinates: 46.49553°S 169.7075°E

A video of Jack's Blowhole

Jack's Bay is a small settlement in The Catlins, an area on the southeastern corner of the South Island of New Zealand. It is located six kilometres southwest of Owaka, close to the mouth of the Catlins River. A popular holiday spot with a seasonal population, there are numerous cribs (holiday homes) at the settlement. Jack's Bay is noted for a large blowhole, known as Jack's Blowhole, a 55-metre-deep blowhole that formed when part of a sea cavern's roof collapsed. The blowhole is 200 metres from the sea.

The bay, blowhole and nearby Tuhawaiki Island (sometimes called Jack's Island) are all named after Hone Tūhawaiki (also known as Bloody Jack), a paramount chief of Kāi Tahu. After losing a battle with one of Te Rauparaha's scouting parties at Cannibal Bay, he was trapped with his men on False Island. Tūhawaiki escaped by leaping from the cliffs into the sea and swimming eight kilometres to Tuhawaiki Island.
