= Maclennan, New Zealand =

Coordinates: 46°33′S 169°29′E

Maclennan is a small settlement in The Catlins, an area of the southern South Island of New Zealand. It is located 20 kilometres southwest of Owaka. From 1915 until its closure on 27 February 1971, the Catlins River Branch railway passed through the village, and the station building and goods shed still stand today.

The town — as well as the nearby mountain range and river — are named after Murdoch Maclennan, an early settler of the area.
