= Catlins River Branch =

Branch line railway in New Zealand

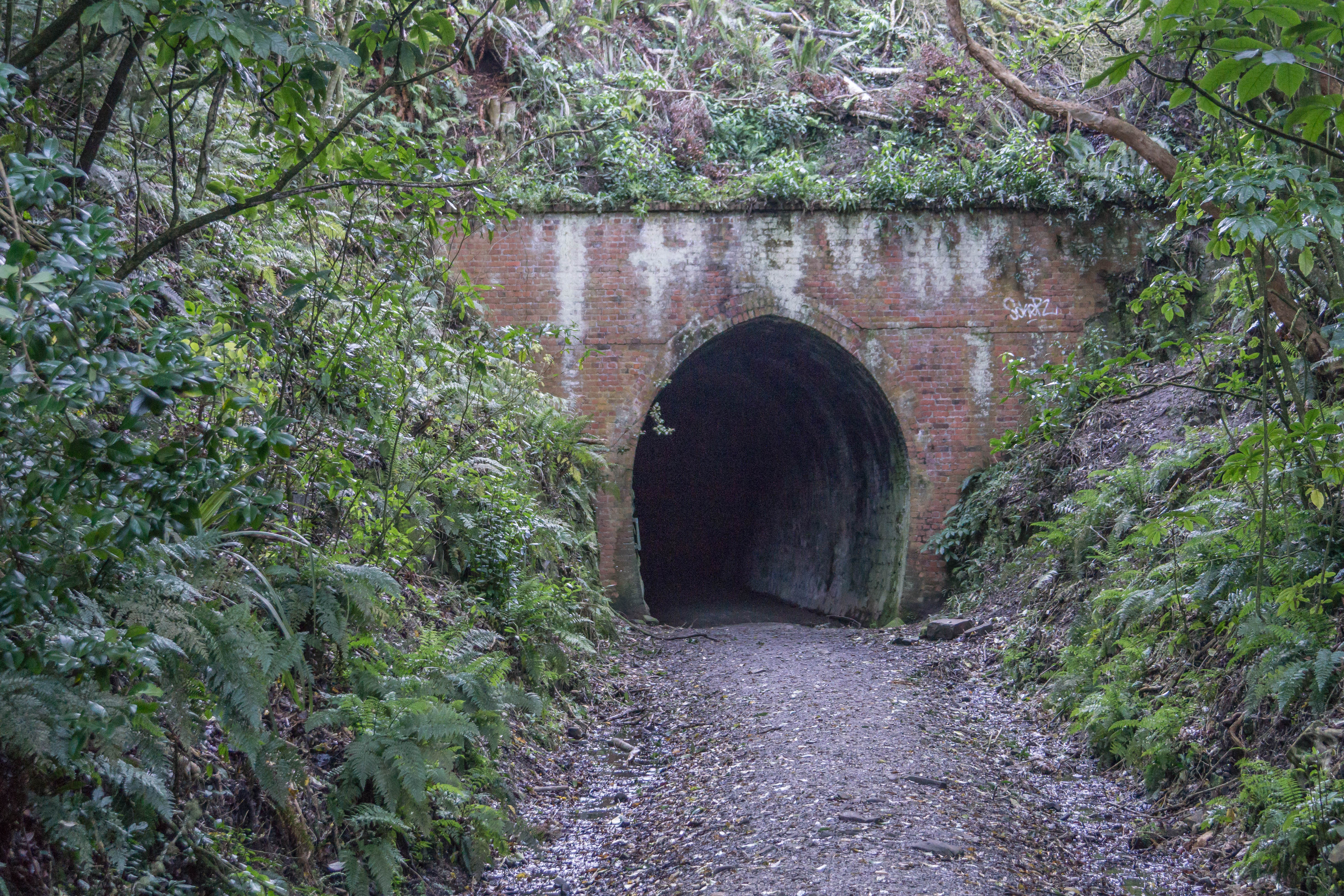
- Tunnel Hill, Historic Walk

Overview
- Other name: Finegand Branch
- Owner: Railways Department
- Locale: Otago, New Zealand
- Termini: Balclutha; Tahakopa
- Stations: 18

Service
- Type: Heavy Rail
- System: New Zealand Government Railways (NZGR)
- Operator: Railways Department

History
- Opened: 4 February 1915
- Passenger Services End: 30 November 1958
- Closed beyond Finegand: 27 February 1971

Technical
- Line length: 68.44 km (42.53 mi)
- Number of tracks: Single
- Character: Rural
- Track gauge: 3 ft 6 in (1,067 mm)

Map

The Catlins River Branch was a branch line railway that formed part of New Zealand's national rail network. It ran through the Catlins region in southwestern Otago and was built in sections between 1879 and 1915. It closed in 1971 except for the first four kilometres, which remain open as the Finegand Branch (formerly named the 'Finegand Industrial Siding'). Along the line was the 221 m (725 ft) Hunts Road tunnel, the southernmost tunnel in New Zealand.

== Construction ==
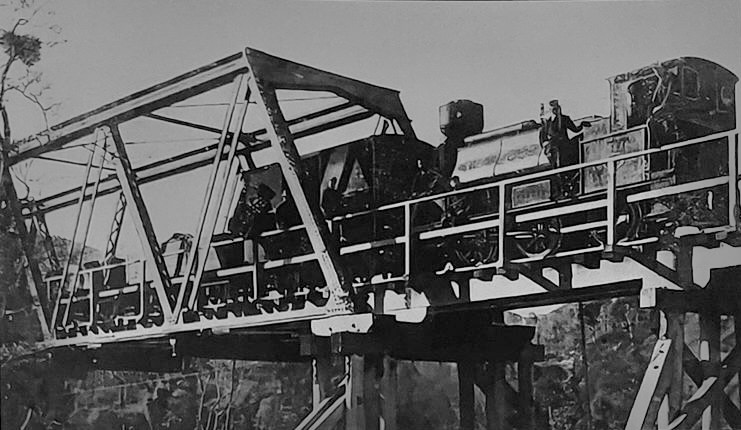
F Class crossing Catlins River, Houipapa

The line was built mainly to provide access to timber for logging companies, as access to the thickly wooded Catlins region was very difficult at the time. The first contract for construction was let on 29 April 1879, but it was not until 15 December 1885 that the first 12.79 km to Romahapa from the junction with the Main South Line in Balclutha were opened. The next stage to Glenomaru added approximately ten more kilometres to the line and opened on 7 July 1891. The opening of the following section was delayed by difficulties in boring the Hunts Road tunnel, and it was on 16 December 1895 that the branch was opened to Tahora. The present-day largest town in the district, Owaka, was reached on 22 June 1896, bringing the line to a length of 31.06 kilometres (19.30 mi). Three years later, construction of the line recommenced, but the difficult terrain meant that it wasn't until 1 August 1904 that the next 5.5 kilometres (3.4 mi) to Ratanui opened. Another five kilometres (3.1 mi), another five years; Houipapa was reached on 17 December 1909. The line eventually reached its ultimate terminus of Tahakopa on 17 February 1915, though it wasn't until 1919/20 that terminal facilities were moved from Maclennan to Tahakopa. There were proposals to extend the line to meet the Tokanui Branch, but these were little more than ploys by ambitious politicians. The rugged landscape proved to be a deterrent to serious extension plans and they were abandoned.

== Stations ==
The following stations were on the Catlins River Branch (distance from the junction in brackets):

- Finegand (3.6 kilometres [2.2 mi]), current end of rails is just beyond the station site at the 4.05 kilometres (2.52 mi) mark.
- Otanomomo (6.46 kilometres [4.01 mi])
- Romahapa (12.79 kilometres [7.95 mi]), in the 1890s, a number of bush tramways operated in the immediate vicinity.
- Glenomaru, second station (19.41 kilometres [12.06 mi])
- Glenomaru, original station (22.79 kilometres [14.16 mi])
- Hunts Road (25.93 kilometres [16.11 mi])
- Tahora (29.23 kilometres [18.16 mi])
- Owaka (31.06 kilometres [19.30 mi]), in the 1890s, a number of bush tramways operated in the immediate vicinity.
- Ratanui (36.65 kilometres [22.77 mi]), also known as Catlins River and junction with bush tramway to sawmill owned by Goss & Co.
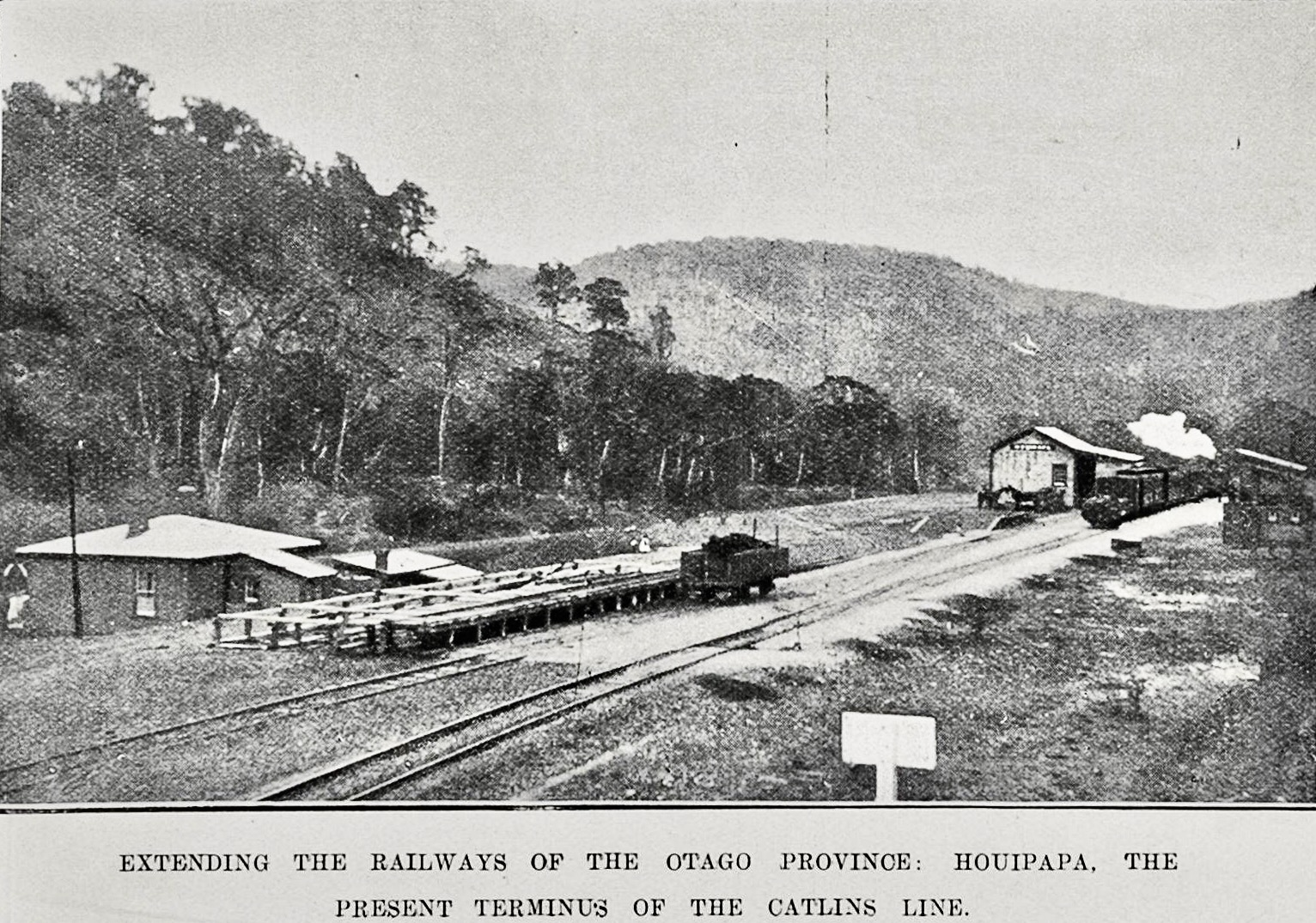
- Houipapa 1912
  Houipapa (40.58 kilometres [25.22 mi]), junction with Houipapa Sawmilling's bush tramway.
- Tawanui (46.21 kilometres [28.71 mi]), junction with Andrew Sharp Ltd's bush tramway; it was open by 1923 and closed in 1952.
- Puketiro (52.14 kilometres [32.40 mi])
- Caberfeidh (56.14 kilometres [34.88 mi])
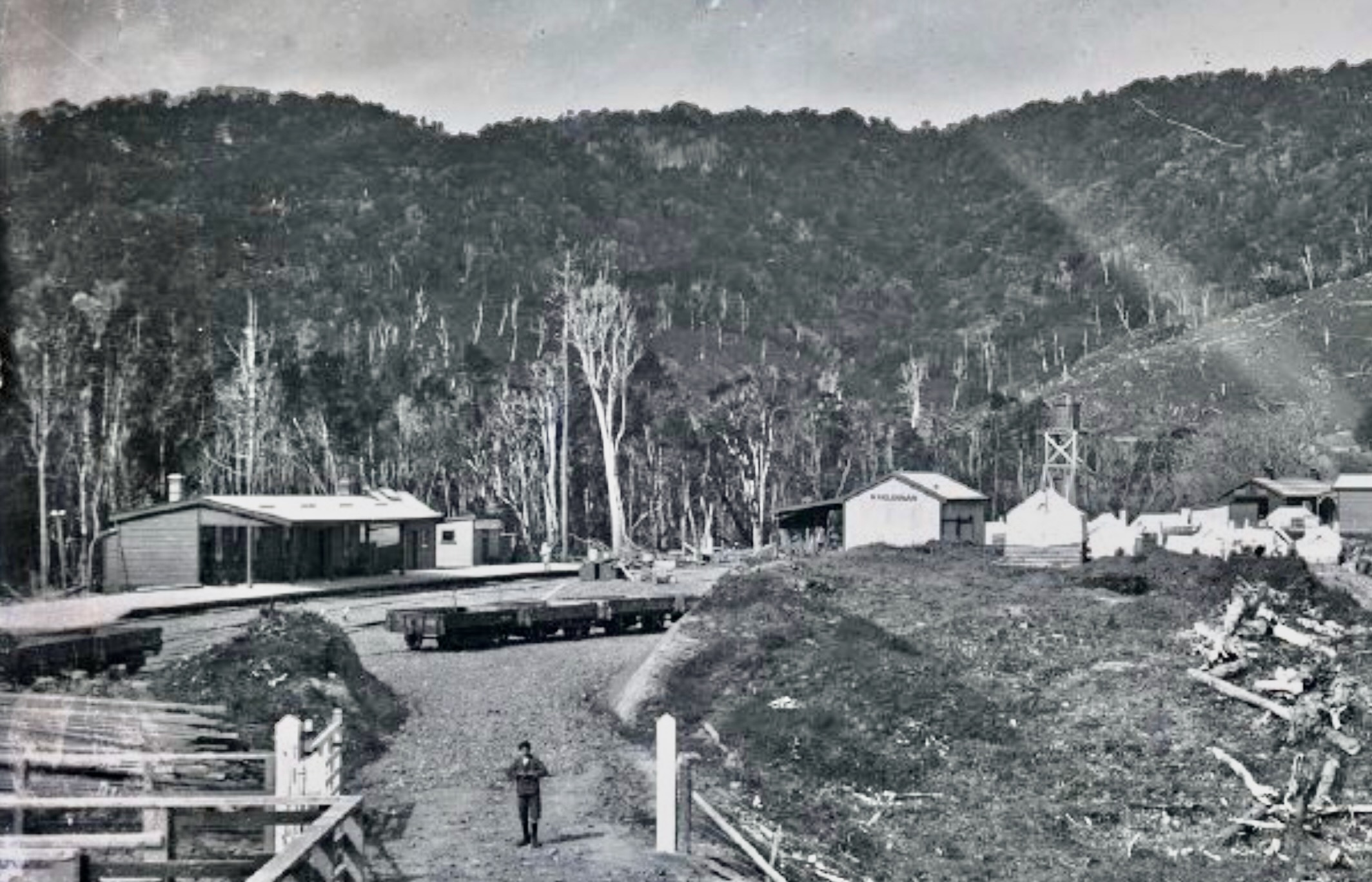
- Maclennan 1914-1920
  Maclennan (60.75 kilometres [37.75 mi]) named Papatowai until 30 June 1914, junction with Maclennan Sawmilling Co.'s bush tramway; it was open by 1923 and closed by 1942.
- Stuarts (64.07 kilometres [39.81 mi]), junction with Latta Bros. bush tramway.
- Campbell's Siding (?? km), junction with Leggatt and Campbell's bush tramway.
- Tahakopa (68.44 kilometres [42.53 mi]), junction with numerous bush tramways.

All bush tramways were closed by the time the branch closed. Many were closed by 1942.

== Operation ==
As the line was built, sawmills were established alongside it and extensive logging began of inland areas as only the coastal forests easily accessible by sea had been previously logged. Every station was located near at least one sawmill, and particularly in the line's first decades, they provided substantial freight traffic. Up to sixteen trains a week would operate, usually mixed trains that carried passengers as well as freight. On Tuesdays, the market day in the Catlins, a dedicated passenger service would run to Balclutha to connect with the express to Dunedin. Passenger traffic began to decline in the 1930s, and although it improved during World War II, the return of peace brought the return of the decline, and on 30 November 1958, passenger services on the line were cancelled. A couple of years previously, the locomotive depot in Tahakopa had closed on 12 August 1956. The local residents had strong feelings for their railway, and when the last Tahakopa-based engine, A 476, departed the isolated terminus, "Now Is the Hour" was sung and a wreath was placed on the locomotive.

Locomotives used on the branch included Q, A, A^{B}, D, F, B^{A}, U^{B}, W^{F}, and V classes. The ruling gradient on the line was 1 in 40 from Maclennan to Puketiro.

With the closure of the Tahakopa depot, trains began operating from Balclutha instead, and with the cessation of passenger services, a freight train ran thrice weekly to Tahakopa (on Mondays, Wednesdays, Fridays), and a fourth service ran as far as Owaka on Tuesdays. The sawmilling industry had been thriving in the 1930s, but three decades later, it was in sharp decline, and agricultural traffic for farms around Owaka had also fallen. The line was dieselised on 5 August 1968. Local residents protested the announcement of the line's closure in July 1970, but the railway administration stood firm and confirmed in October that the date of closure would be 27 February 1971. A number of final excursions were held, with the last proving to be quite eventful. A^{B} 795 (now preserved to run the Kingston Flyer) lost its sanding ability as it climbed from Owaka to Takahopa and therefore could not grip the rails. Although repairs were conducted at the terminus, the engine's firebox arch collapsed on the return journey and D^{J} 1243 had to run the train from Owaka back to Dunedin, finally arriving at 1 am the next morning.

The line's closure did not affect the first four kilometres (2.5 mi) to Finegand, which remain open as an industrial siding to a freezing works.

== Today ==
Although remnants of closed railways diminish and disappear as a result of both nature and human activity, the Catlins River Branch is a well-preserved line due to its isolated location. The Hunts Road tunnel is preserved by the New Zealand Department of Conservation and can be walked; the old railway's formation to the tunnel is quite visible at this point, as it is at many other locations along the line. Goods sheds and station buildings still stand in Maclennan, Romahapa (in this case, the station building has been resited), Takahopa, and Tawanui. Station buildings can also be found at Puketiro and Caberfeidh. In Takahopa, some rails are embedded in a road by the yard's former site, wheels from logging trolleys used on a bush tramway remain at the location of Stuart's yard, and the bridge over the Romahapa Creek continues to stand.
