= Ōwaka River =

River on South Island, New Zealand

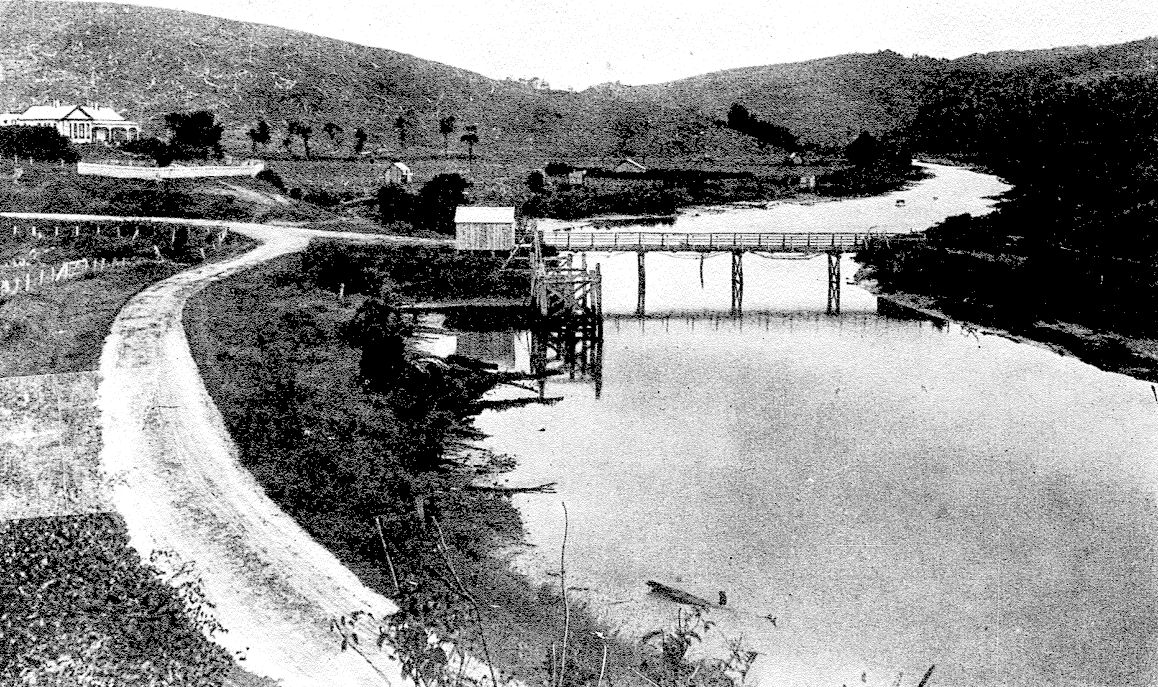
- View along the Ōwaka River towards Tahora, 1916

Location
- Country: New Zealand
- Island: South Island
- Area: The Catlins
- District: Clutha

Physical characteristics
- Source
  - location: Mount Rosebery
- Mouth: Pacific Ocean
  - location: Pounawea
  - coordinates: 46°28′S 169°42′E
- Length: 30 kilometres (19 mi)

The Ōwaka River, until 2019 officially the Owaka River, flows southeastward through The Catlins, an area of the southern South Island of New Zealand. Its total length is 30 kilometres (19 mi), and it shares the estuary of the Catlins River, flowing into the Pacific Ocean at Pounawea, 28 kilometres (17 mi) south of Balclutha. Its source is on the slopes of Mount Rosebery, 12 kilometres (7.5 mi) south of Clinton. The Ōwaka River is located within the Clutha District.

The small town of Owaka is situated about one kilometre from the south bank of the river. The locality of Tahora was located at the Ōwaka River where the road and railway crossed the river; there is little trace of that settlement visible today.
