= Telford (Southern Institute of Technology) =

Southern Institute of Technology campus

Coordinates: 46.28560°S 169.73233°E

Telford – Southern Institute of Technology
- Te Whāre Wanaka Puerua
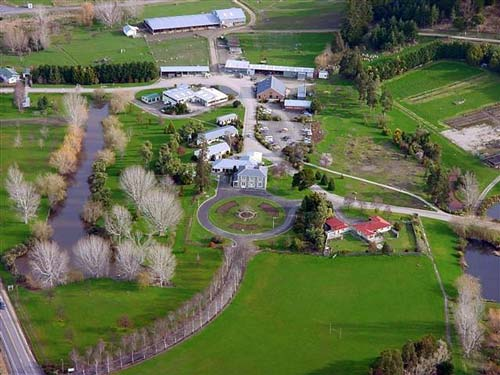
- Aerial view of Telford campus
- Established: 1964
- Address: 498 Owaka Highway, Balclutha 9271, Otago, New Zealand, Balclutha, New Zealand
- Website: http://www.sit.ac.nz/Telford

The Telford campus of the Southern Institute of Technology is a public Tertiary Education Institution. Its campus is in Otanomomo, just south of Balclutha, South Otago in the South Island of New Zealand.

Telford was founded as the Telford Farm Training Institute in 1964 and became an external campus of Lincoln University as Telford Rural Polytechnic in the 1990s. In 2019 Telford became a faculty of the Southern Institute of Technology.

Telford delivers NZQA accredited sub-degree programmes with a rural focus, including general agriculture, dairy, vet technician and equine programmes.

As part of New Zealand's recovery from the COVID-19 pandemic, Telford is hosting Agricultural Contractor Training to retrain individuals affected by the SARS-CoV-19 pandemic. This will ensure sufficient contractors are available for the 2020/21 season, which has previously relied on overseas contractors from countries such as England and Ireland.
