= Catlins River =

River in Southland Region, New Zealand

Coordinates: 46°29′S 169°43′E

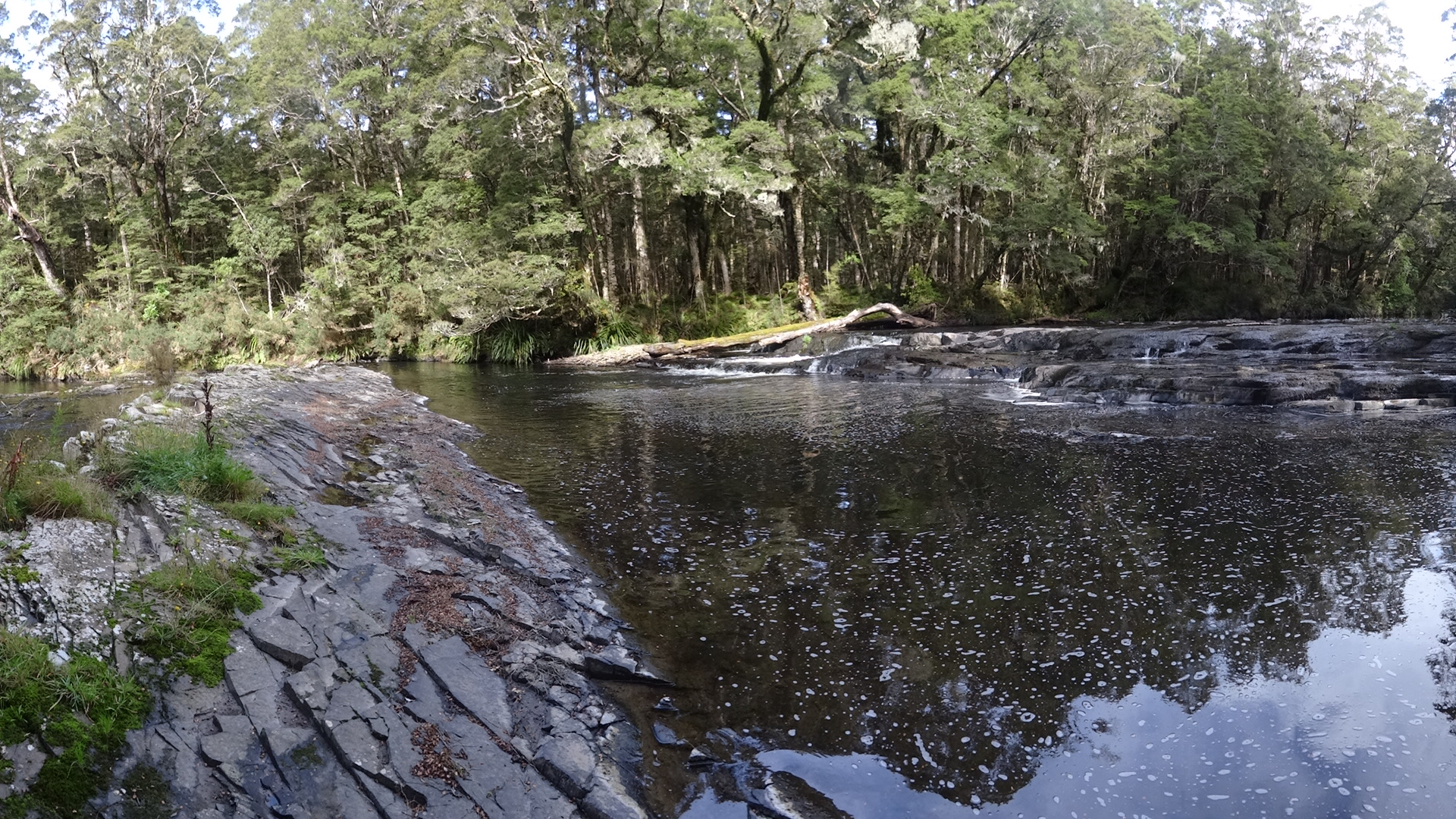
The Catlins River as seen from the Catlins River Walk

The Catlins River flows southeastward through The Catlins, an area of the southern South Island of New Zealand. Its total length is 42 kilometres (26 mi), and it flows into the Pacific Ocean at the holiday settlement of Pounawea, 28 kilometres (17 mi) south of Balclutha. Its upper estuary is called Catlins Lake, and its lower estuary is shared with the Ōwaka River. The lower estuary is also known at Pounawea Estuary.

The river's source is west of Mount Rosebery, 15 kilometres (9 mi) southwest of Clinton.

== See also ==
- Owaka
