= Owaka =

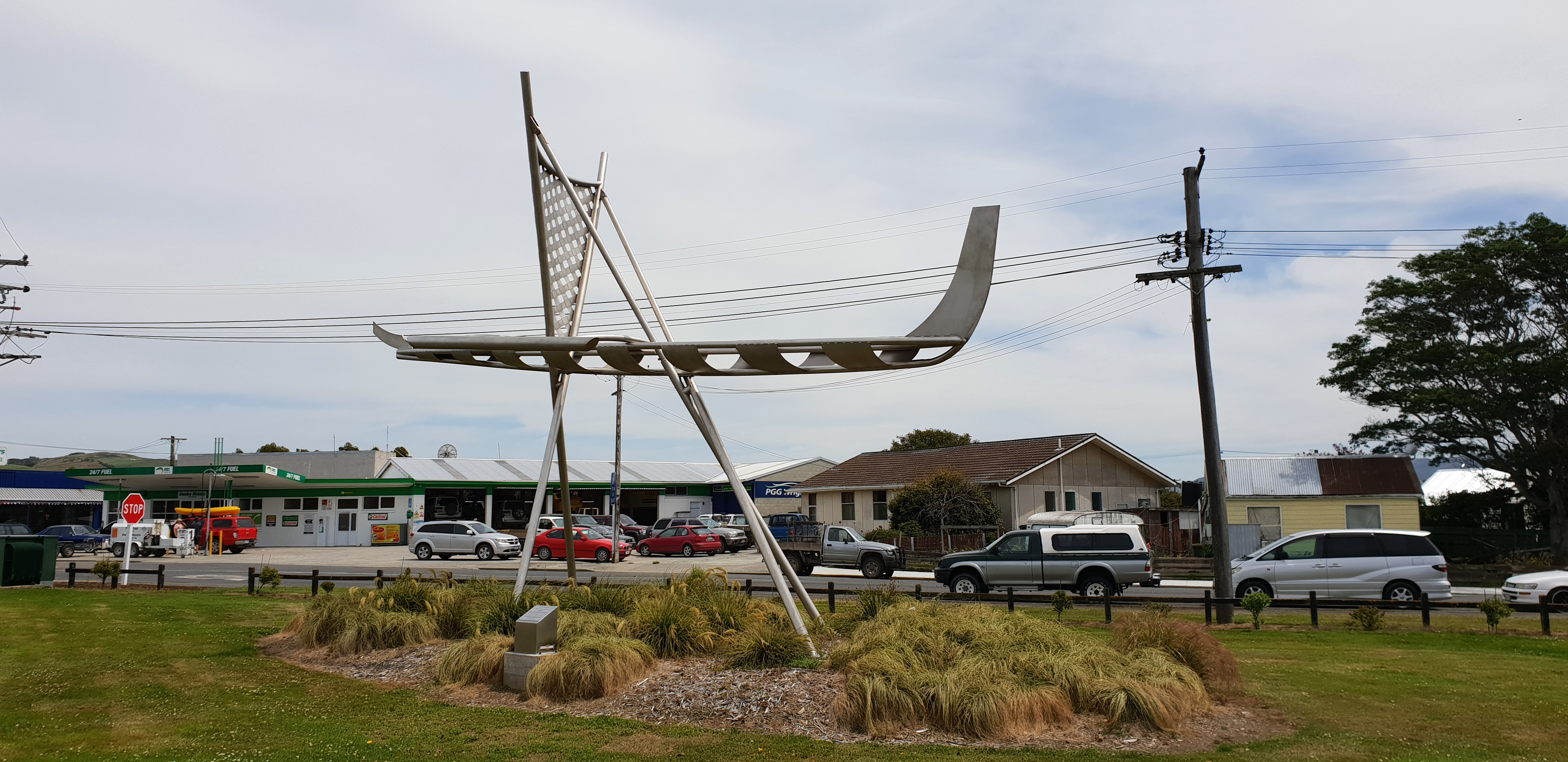
- Interactive map of Owaka
- Coordinates: 46°27′S 169°40′E
- Country: New Zealand
- Region: Otago
- District: Clutha District
- Ward: Catlins
- Electorates: Southland; Te Tai Tonga (Māori)

Government
  - Territorial authority: Clutha District Council
  - Regional council: Otago Regional Council
  - Mayor of Clutha: Jock Martin
  - Southland MP: Joseph Mooney
  - Te Tai Tonga MP: Tākuta Ferris

Area
  - Total: 0.76 km^{2} (0.29 sq mi)

Population (June 2025)
  - Total: 340
  - Density: 450/km^{2} (1,200/sq mi)

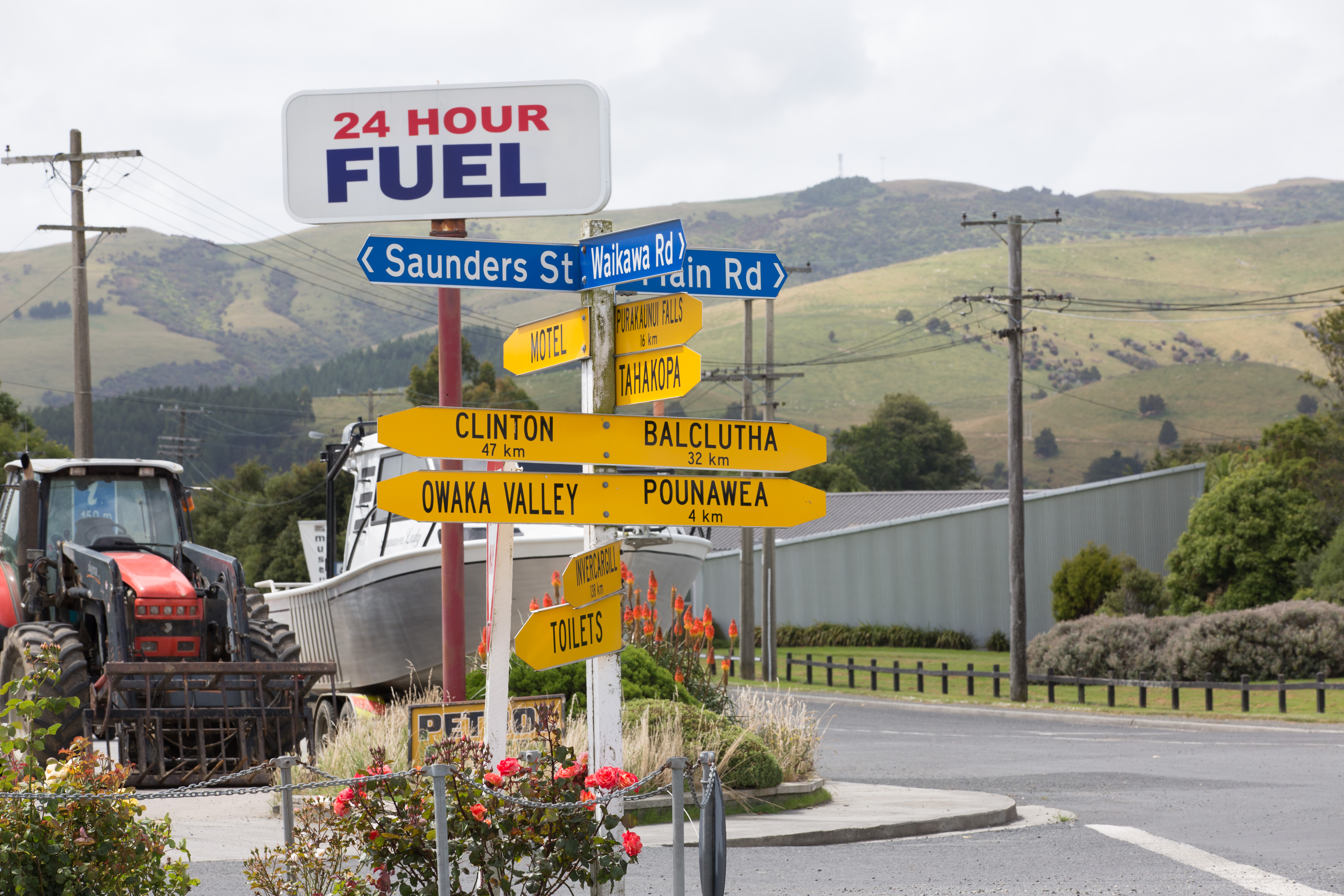
Signposts

Owaka is a small town in the Clutha District of South Otago, in the South Island of New Zealand. It is the largest community in the rugged, forested Catlins area, close to the border with Southland, some 35 km (22 mi) south of Balclutha on the Southern Scenic Route.

== Geography ==
Owaka lies 2 kilometres (1.2 mi) to the north of Catlins Lake, an estuarial widening in the Catlins River which is largely mudflats at low tide. The mouth of the river, shared with the smaller Ōwaka River, lies 5 kilometres (3.1 mi) to the southeast of the town. The smaller settlement and holiday location of Pounawea is 3 kilometres (1.9 mi) from Owaka on the estuary of the Catlins and Owaka rivers. The town lies on a river flat surrounded by hills - it is overlooked by the 103-metre (338 ft) Mount Misery, which lies immediately to the town's east.

== History ==
The town's name comes from the Māori for "the place of canoes", a reference to the town's location close to the Ōwaka River, which joins the Catlins River three kilometres (2 miles) from the town, close to the coast. The town was originally called Catlins River, then Quakerfield.

On 22 June 1896, Owaka became the terminus of the Catlins River Branch railway, and it retained this status until an extension of the branch line to Ratanui was opened on 1 August 1904. The railway ultimately terminated in Tahakopa, but as traffic declined on the line in its later years, the Tuesday freight train (one of four per week) ran only as far as Owaka after 1958.

The branch closed on 27 February 1971, and little evidence of its existence remains in or around Owaka besides some of the line's old formation, as the last substantial relic, Owaka station's goods shed, was removed in 1986.

In November 1991, 15-year old Kylie Smith was abducted in Owaka and was raped and murdered by Paul Bailey. Bailey pled guilty in 1992, and was subsequently jailed for life, with a non-parole period of 10 years. In 2021, his application for parole was denied and it was also denied at his next opportunities in 2023 and 2025. Bailey's offending had a substantial impact on the town at the time: the local pastor, who had assisted Bailey in gaining employment in Owaka, had his house vandalised, and a lynch mob threatened to burn down his church, whilst that same mob burned down Bailey's house.

== Demographics ==
Owaka is described by Statistics New Zealand as a rural settlement. It covers 0.76 km^{2} (0.29 sq mi), and had an estimated population of 340 as of June 2025, with a population density of 447 people per km^{2}. It is part of the much larger Catlins statistical area.

Historical population
Year	Pop.	±% p.a.
2006	327	—
2013	306	−0.94%
2018	309	+0.20%

Owaka had a population of 309 at the 2018 New Zealand census, an increase of 3 people (1.0%) since the 2013 census, and a decrease of 18 people (−5.5%) since the 2006 census. There were 141 households, comprising 153 males and 156 females, giving a sex ratio of 0.98 males per female, with 51 people (16.5%) aged under 15 years, 42 (13.6%) aged 15 to 29, 150 (48.5%) aged 30 to 64, and 69 (22.3%) aged 65 or older.

Ethnicities were 99.0% European/Pākehā, 14.6% Māori, and 1.0% other ethnicities. People may identify with more than one ethnicity.

Although some people chose not to answer the census's question about religious affiliation, 66.0% had no religion, 23.3% were Christian, 1.0% had Māori religious beliefs and 1.0% had other religions.

Of those at least 15 years old, 21 (8.1%) people had a bachelor's or higher degree, and 84 (32.6%) people had no formal qualifications. 18 people (7.0%) earned over $70,000 compared to 17.2% nationally. The employment status of those at least 15 was that 123 (47.7%) people were employed full-time, 39 (15.1%) were part-time, and 9 (3.5%) were unemployed.

== Education ==
The Catlins Area School is a co-educational state area school for Year 1 to 13 students, with a roll of 128 as of July 2026. The school opened in 1875 as Owaka District High School.

== Climate ==
Climate data for Owaka (1981–2010)
Month	Jan	Feb	Mar	Apr	May	Jun	Jul	Aug	Sep	Oct	Nov	Dec	Year
Mean daily maximum °C (°F)	19.1 (66.4)	18.9 (66.0)	17.4 (63.3)	15.6 (60.1)	12.8 (55.0)	10.5 (50.9)	10.2 (50.4)	11.5 (52.7)	13.5 (56.3)	14.8 (58.6)	16.3 (61.3)	17.5 (63.5)	14.8 (58.7)
Daily mean °C (°F)	14.3 (57.7)	13.8 (56.8)	12.3 (54.1)	10.1 (50.2)	8.2 (46.8)	6.0 (42.8)	5.6 (42.1)	6.7 (44.1)	8.4 (47.1)	9.8 (49.6)	11.4 (52.5)	12.8 (55.0)	10.0 (49.9)
Mean daily minimum °C (°F)	9.5 (49.1)	8.7 (47.7)	7.1 (44.8)	4.6 (40.3)	3.5 (38.3)	1.4 (34.5)	1.0 (33.8)	1.8 (35.2)	3.4 (38.1)	4.8 (40.6)	6.4 (43.5)	8.2 (46.8)	5.0 (41.1)
Average rainfall mm (inches)	94.0 (3.70)	69.3 (2.73)	84.9 (3.34)	54.6 (2.15)	96.0 (3.78)	87.3 (3.44)	100.2 (3.94)	59.2 (2.33)	64.2 (2.53)	76.3 (3.00)	54.8 (2.16)	86.9 (3.42)	927.7 (36.52)
Source: NIWA (rain 1971–2000)
