= Tahakopa =

Locality in Clutha District, Otago Region, New Zealand

Coordinates: 46°31′S 169°23′E

Tahakopa is a small settlement in The Catlins, an area of the southern South Island of New Zealand. It is located 25 kilometres northeast of Waikawa on the Tahakopa River. On 17 February 1915, Tahakopa became the terminus of the Catlins River Branch railway and retained this status until the branch line was closed on 27 February 1971. From the line's opening until 12 August 1956, a railway locomotive depot was based in the village. The old station building and goods shed still stand today.
