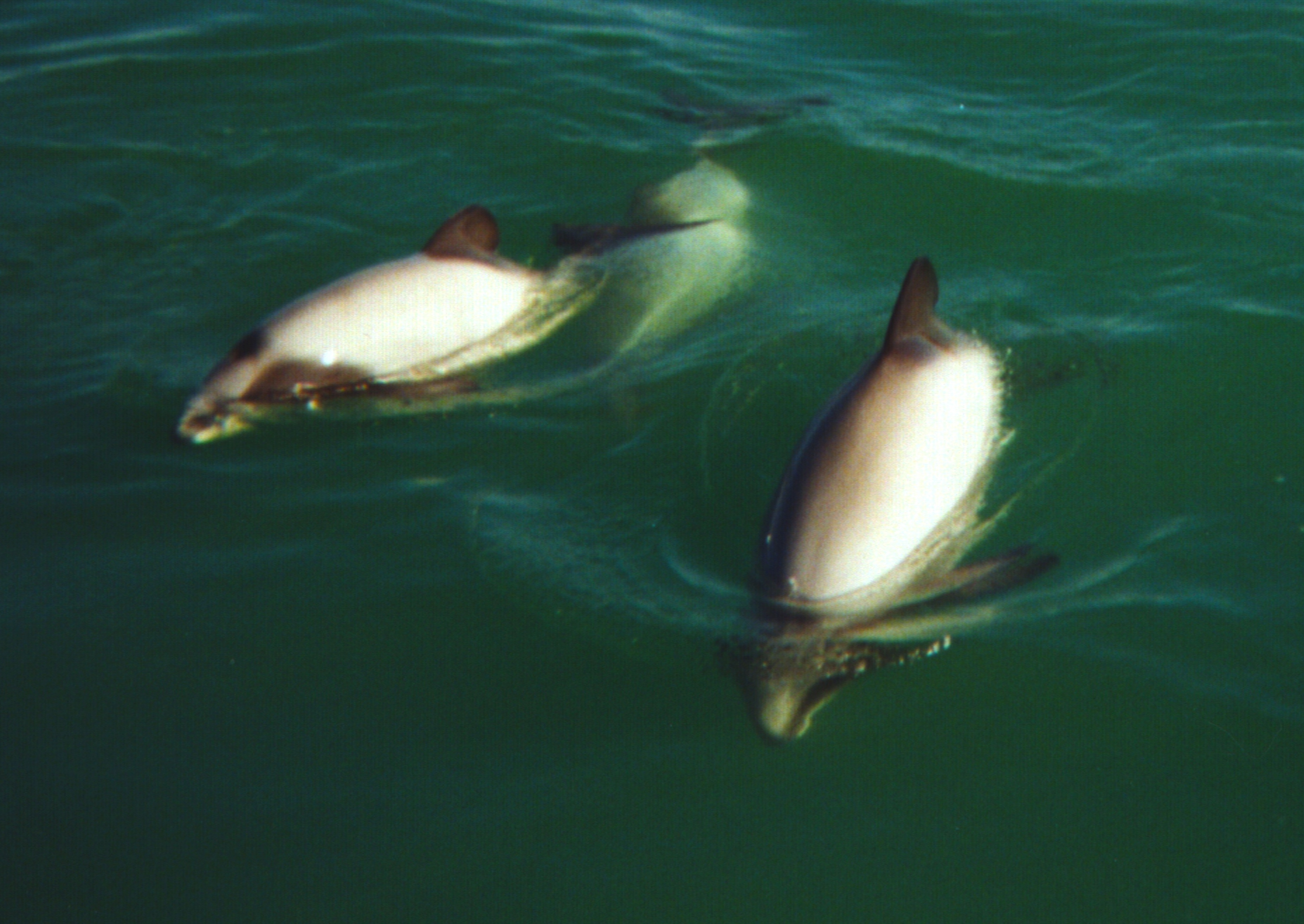

- Size compared to an average human

Conservation status
- Endangered (IUCN 3.1)
- CITES Appendix II

Scientific classification
- Kingdom: Animalia
- Phylum: Chordata
- Class: Mammalia
- Order: Artiodactyla
- Infraorder: Cetacea
- Family: Delphinidae
- Genus: Cephalorhynchus
- Species: C. hectori

Binomial name
- Cephalorhynchus hectori Van Beneden, 1881

Subspecies
- C. h. hectori; C. h. maui
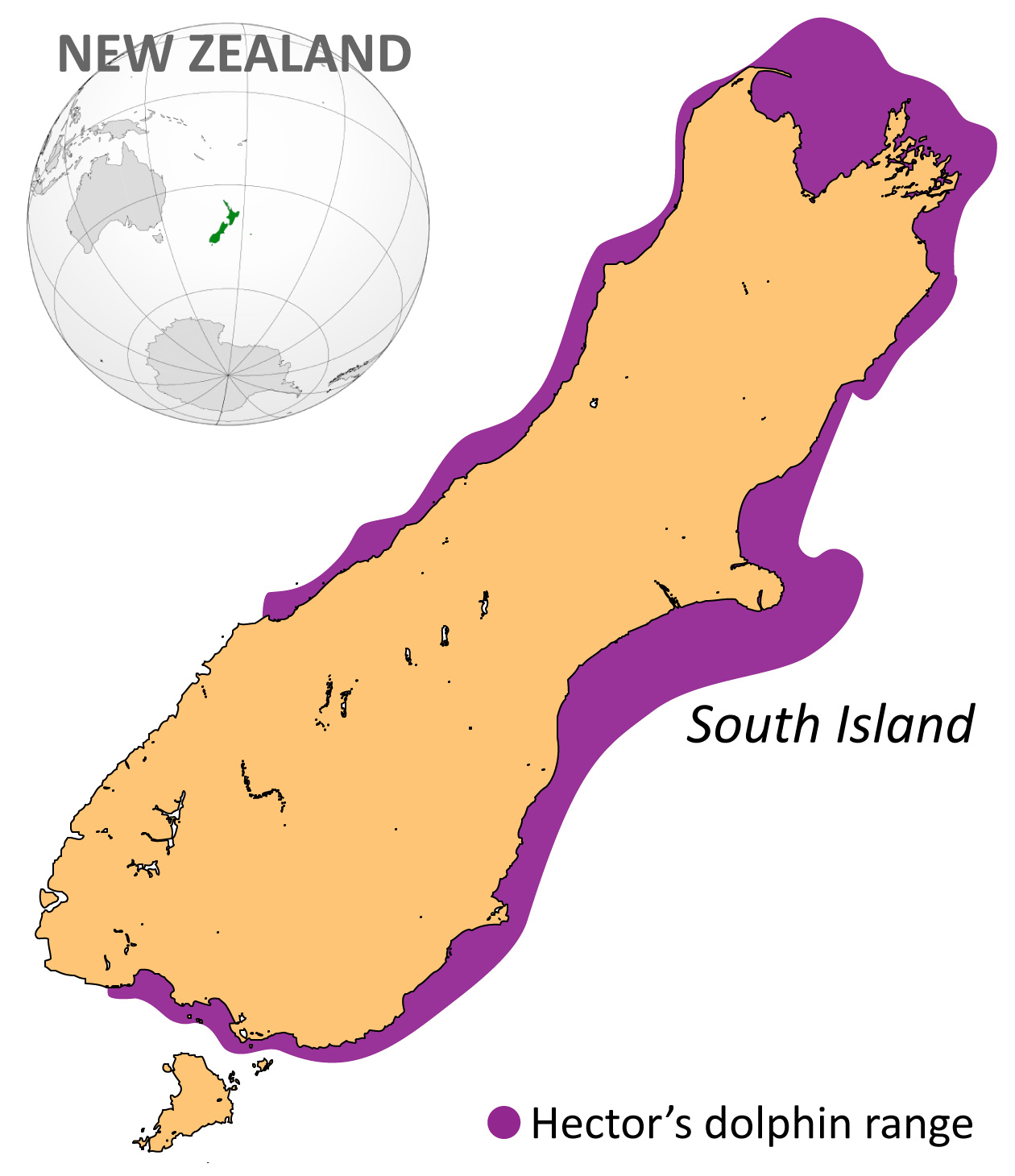

= Hector's dolphin =

Species of mammal

Hector's dolphin (Cephalorhynchus hectori) is one of six dolphin species belonging to the genus Cephalorhynchus. Hector's dolphin is the only cetacean endemic to New Zealand, and comprises two subspecies: C. h. hectori, the more numerous subspecies, also referred to as South Island Hector's dolphin, and C. h. maui, the critically endangered Māui dolphin that is found off the West Coast of New Zealand's North Island.

Distinctive features of the species include a rounded dorsal fin, grey, white, and black coloration, and a stocky body shape. Their lifespan is typically around 20 years, and the species favours shallow coastal waters around the South Island, where they live in small groups and use echolocation clicks to communicate.

Threats to the species include bycatch in gillnets and trawls, disease, genetic issues, and additional anthropogenic hazards. Action to conserve the species has been taken through the establishment of marine protected areas and other recent protections.

== Etymology ==
Hector's dolphin was named after New Zealand scientist and explorer James Hector (1834–1907), who became the director of the Colonial Museum in Wellington (now the Museum of New Zealand Te Papa Tongarewa), where he oversaw the publication of annual geological exploration reports. The species was scientifically described by Belgian zoologist Pierre-Joseph van Beneden in 1881. Māori names for Hector's dolphin include Tutumairekurai, Tuupoupou, Pehipehi, Hopuhopu, Upokohue, and Waiaua.

== Description ==
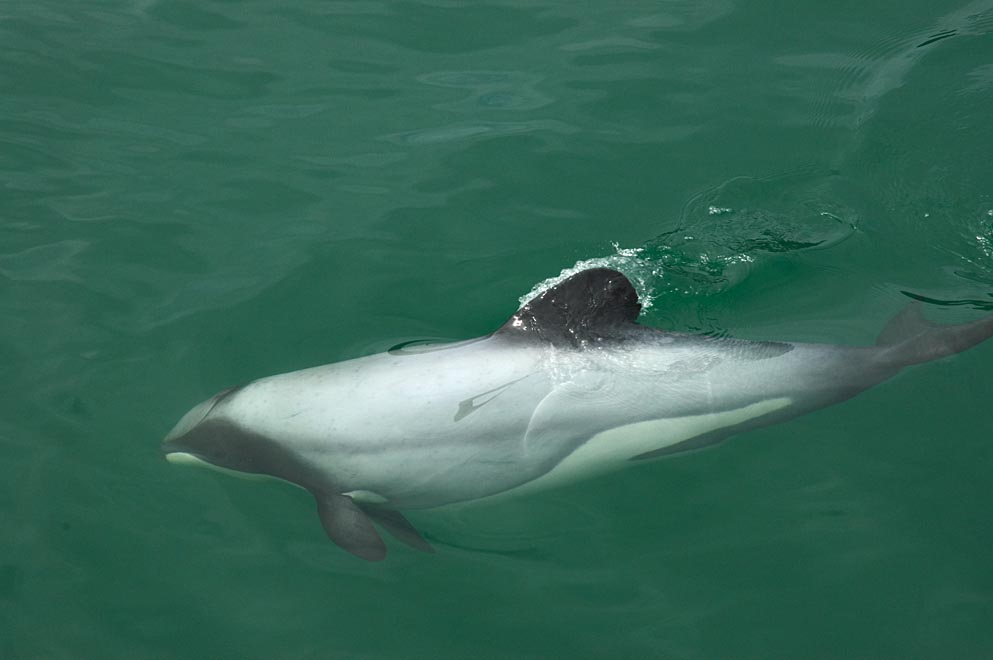
Hector's dolphin has a unique rounded dorsal fin.

Hector's dolphin is the smallest dolphin species. Mature adults have a total length of 1.2–1.6 m (3 ft 11 in – 5 ft 3 in) and weigh 40–60 kg (88–132 lb). The species is sexually dimorphic, with females being about 5–7% longer than males. The body shape is stocky, with a large fluke relative to their body size and no discernible beak. The most distinctive feature is the rounded dorsal fin, with a convex trailing edge and undercut rear margin. Māui dolphins tend to be longer than South Island Hector's dolphins.

The overall coloration of Hector's dolphins is a mixture of grey, white, and black. Their eyes are surrounded by a black mask, and a thin black line extends from the head to the blowhole. The throat and belly are white, while the rest of the dolphin is grey.

At birth, Hector's dolphin calves have a total length of 60–80 cm (24–31 in) and weigh 8–10 kg (18–22 lb). Their coloration is the almost same as adults, although the grey has a darker hue. Newborn Hector's dolphins have distinct fetal fold marks on their flanks that cause a change in the coloration pattern of the skin. These changes are visible for approximately six months and consist of four to six vertical light grey stripes against darker grey skin.

== Life history ==
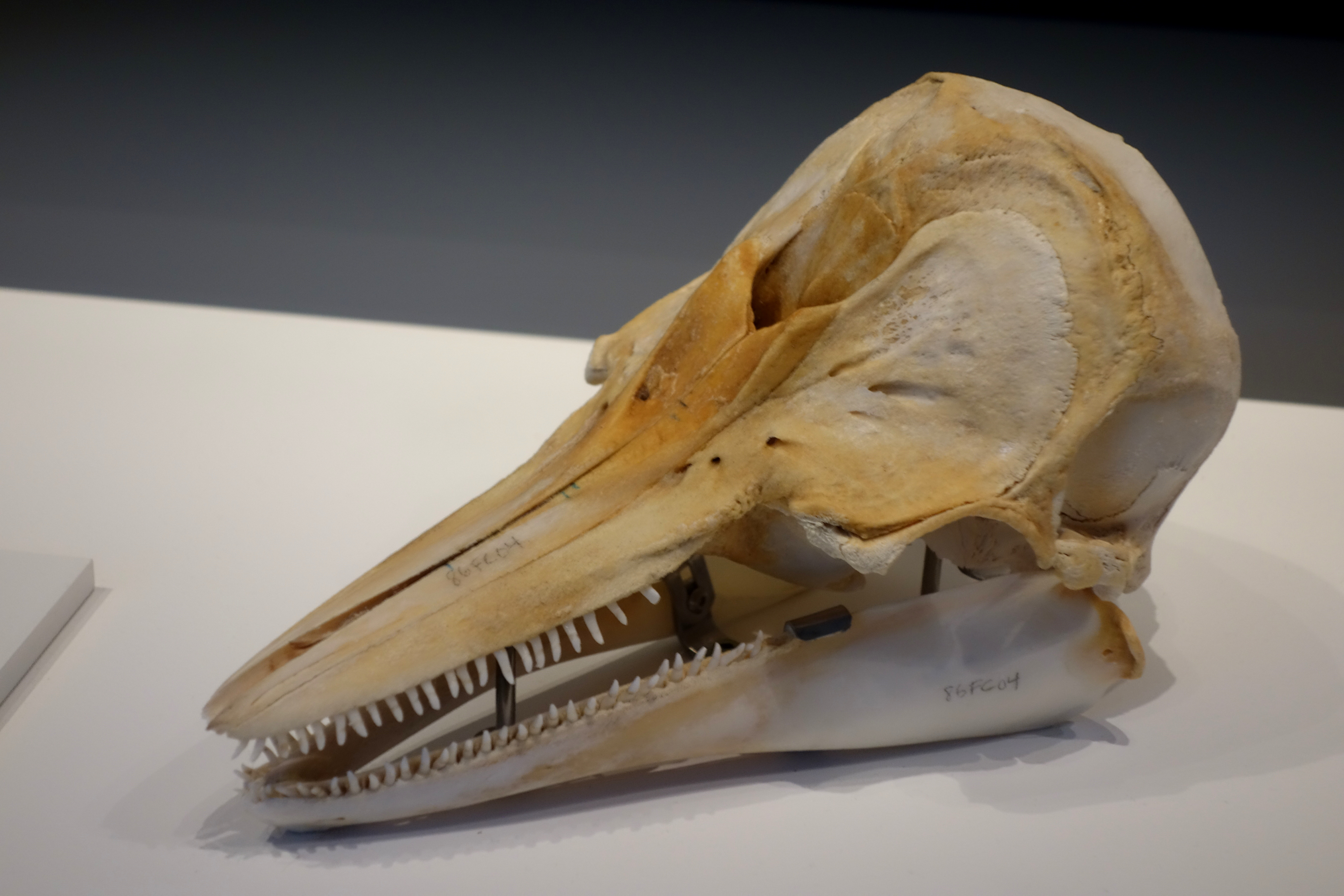
Skull

Data from field studies, beached individuals, and dolphins caught in fishing nets have provided information on their life history and reproductive parameters. Photo-ID based observations at Banks Peninsula from 1984 to 2006 show that individuals can reach at least 22 years of age. Males attain sexual maturity between 6 and 9 years old and females begin calving between 7 and 9 years old. Females will continue to calve every 2–3 years, resulting in a maximum of 4–7 calves in one female's lifetime. Calving occurs during the spring and summer. Calves are assumed to be weaned at around one year of age, and the mortality rate in the first 6 months has been estimated to be around 36%.

These combined characteristics mean that, like many other cetaceans, Hector's dolphins are only capable of slow population growth. Previously their maximum population growth had been estimated at 1.8–4.9% per year. This estimate was later updated to 3–7% per year based on updated demographic information and a life history invariant observed across all vertebrates. Due to the short lifespan and slow population increase rate of the species, Hector's dolphin populations are vulnerable and at risk of decline.

== Ecology ==
=== Habitat ===
The species' range includes murky coastal waters out to 100 m (330 ft) depth, though almost all sightings are in waters shallower than 50 m (160 ft). The species is most often observed about 1000 m from the shoreline. Hector's dolphins display a seasonal inshore-offshore movement; favouring shallow coastal waters during spring and summer, and moving offshore into deeper waters during autumn and winter. The species tends to display more dispersal during the winter season. They have also been shown to return to the same location during consecutive summers, displaying high foraging site fidelity. The inshore-offshore movement of Hector's dolphins are thought to relate to seasonal patterns of turbidity and the inshore movements of prey species during spring and summer.

=== Diet ===
Hector's dolphins are generalist feeders, with prey selection based on size (mostly under 10 cm in length) rather than species, although spiny species appear to be avoided. The largest prey item recovered from a Hector's dolphin stomach was an undigested red cod weighing 500 g with a standard length of 35 cm. The stomach contents of dissected dolphins include a mixture of surface-schooling fish, midwater fish, squid, and a variety of benthic species. The main prey species in terms of mass contribution is red cod, and other important prey include flatfish (Peltorhamphus), ahuru (Auchenoceros punctatus), New Zealand sprat (Sprattus muelleri), New Zealand arrow squid (Nototodarus sloanii), and juvenile giant stargazer (Kathetostoma giganteum).

=== Predators ===
The remains of Hector's dolphins have been found in the stomachs of broadnose sevengill sharks (Notorynchus cepedianus, considered to be their main predator), great white sharks (Carcharodon carcharias) and blue sharks (Prionace glauca). Unconfirmed predators of Hector's dolphins include orca (Orcinus orca), mako sharks (Isurus) and copper sharks (Carcharhinus brachyurus).

== Behaviour ==
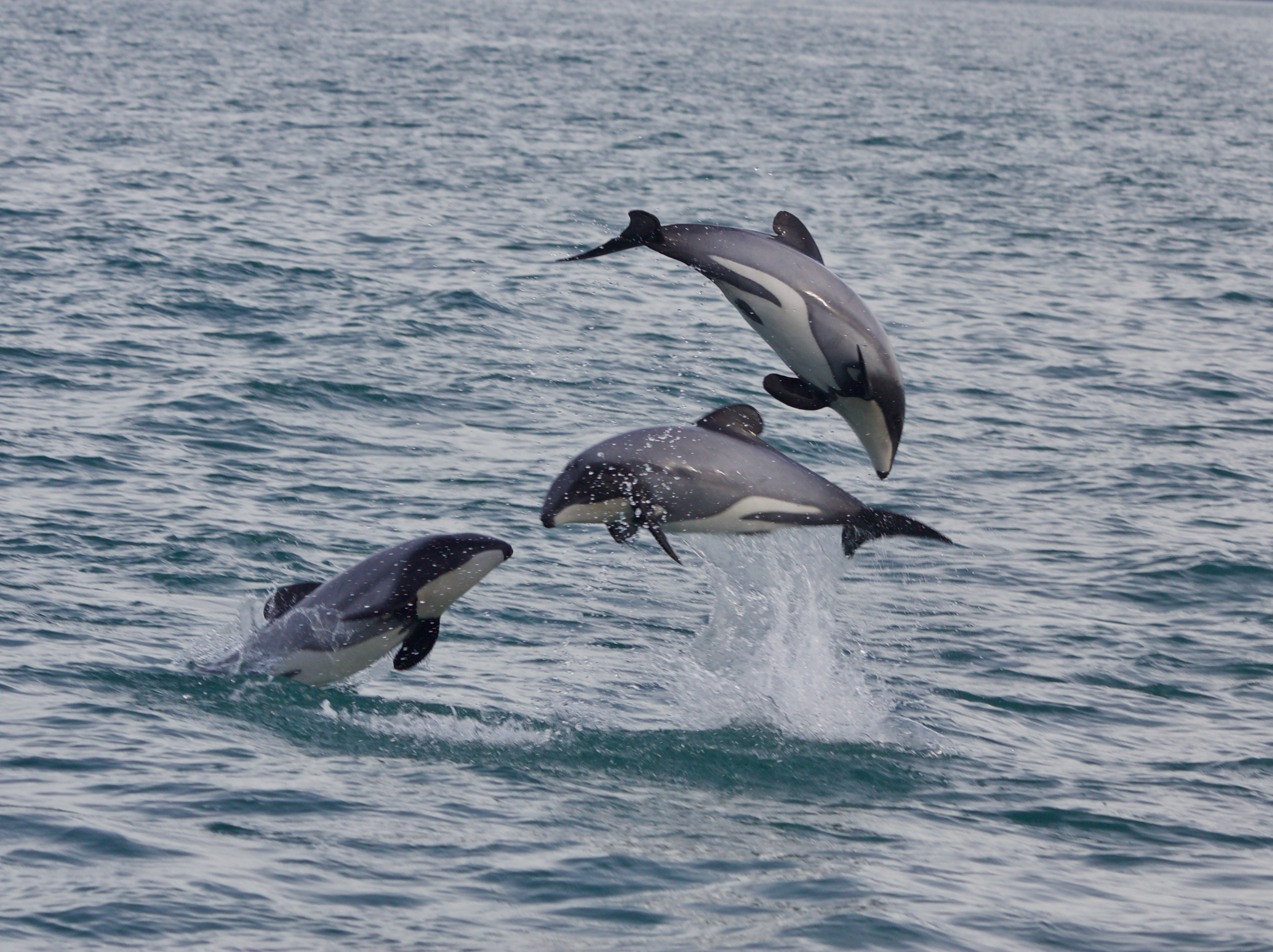
Group jumping

=== Group dynamics ===
Hector's dolphins have been found to show a high level of fluidity with weak inter-individual associations, meaning they do not form strong bonds with other individuals. Three types of small preferential groups have been found: nursery groups; immature and subadult groups; and adult male/female groups. They display a sex-age population group composition, meaning they group by biological sex and age, and have a mean group size of 3.8 individuals, preferring to form sex-segregated groups of less than 5 individuals. Groups of greater than 5 individuals are formed much less frequently, are usually composed of members of both sexes, and have been shown to form only to forage or participate in sexual behaviour. Nursery groups can also be observed and are usually composed of less than 7 mothers and their young, with no adult males present.

=== Sexual behaviour ===
Males of the species have extremely large testes in proportion to body size, with the highest relative weight in one study being 2.9% of body weight. Large testes in combination with males' smaller overall body size suggests a promiscuous mating system. This type of reproductive system would involve a male attempting to fertilise as many females as possible and little male-male aggression. The amount of sexual behaviour per individual in the species is observed most when small single sex groups form large mixed sex groups. Sexual behaviour in the species is usually non-aggressive.

=== Echolocation ===
Similar to the hourglass dolphin, Hector's dolphins use high-frequency echolocation clicks. However, the Hector's dolphin produces lower source-level clicks than hourglass dolphins due to their crowded environment. This means they can only spot prey at half the distance compared to an hourglass dolphin. The species has a very simple repertoire with few types of clicks, as well as little audible signals in addition to these. More complex clicks could be observed in large groups.

== Distribution and population size ==
Hector's dolphins are endemic to the coastal regions of New Zealand. The South Island Hector's dolphin is most abundant in discontinuous regions of high turbidity around the South Island. They are most abundant off the East Coast and West Coast, most notably around Banks Peninsula, with smaller, more isolated populations off the North Coast and South Coast (notably at Te Waewae Bay). Around Banks Peninsula, some areas are used much more heavily than others; these areas continue to be preferred over decades. Smaller populations are scattered around the South Island, including: Cook Strait, Kaikōura, Catlins (e.g., Porpoise Bay, Curio Bay), and Otago coasts (e.g.Karitane, Oamaru, Moeraki, Otago Harbour, and Blueskin Bay). Māui dolphin are typically found on the west coast of the North Island between Maunganui Bluff and Whanganui.

An aerial survey of South Island Hector's dolphin abundance—which was commissioned by the Ministry for Primary Industries, carried out by the Cawthron Institute, and endorsed by the International Whaling Commission—estimated a total population size of 14,849 dolphins (95% confidence interval = 11,923–18,492). This was almost twice the previous published estimate from earlier surveys (7,300; 95% CI 5,303–9,966). This difference was primarily due to a much larger estimated population along the east coast, which was also distributed further offshore than previously thought.

The latest population estimate of the Māui dolphin was published in 2023, and indicated just 48 individuals.

=== Mixing of subspecies ===
In 2012, a genetic analysis of tissue samples from dolphins in the core Maui dolphin range, including historical samples, revealed the presence of at least three South Island Hector's dolphins off the West Coast of the North Island (two of them alive), along with another five South Island Hector's dolphins sampled between Wellington and Oakura from 1967 to 2012.

Previously, the deep waters of the Cook Strait were considered to be an effective barrier to mixing between the South Island Hector's and North Island Māui sub-species for around 15,000 and 16,000 years. This is coeval with the separation of the North and South Islands of New Zealand at the end of the last ice age. To date, there is no evidence of interbreeding between South Island Hector's dolphin and Māui dolphin despite their close genetic composition.

== Threats ==
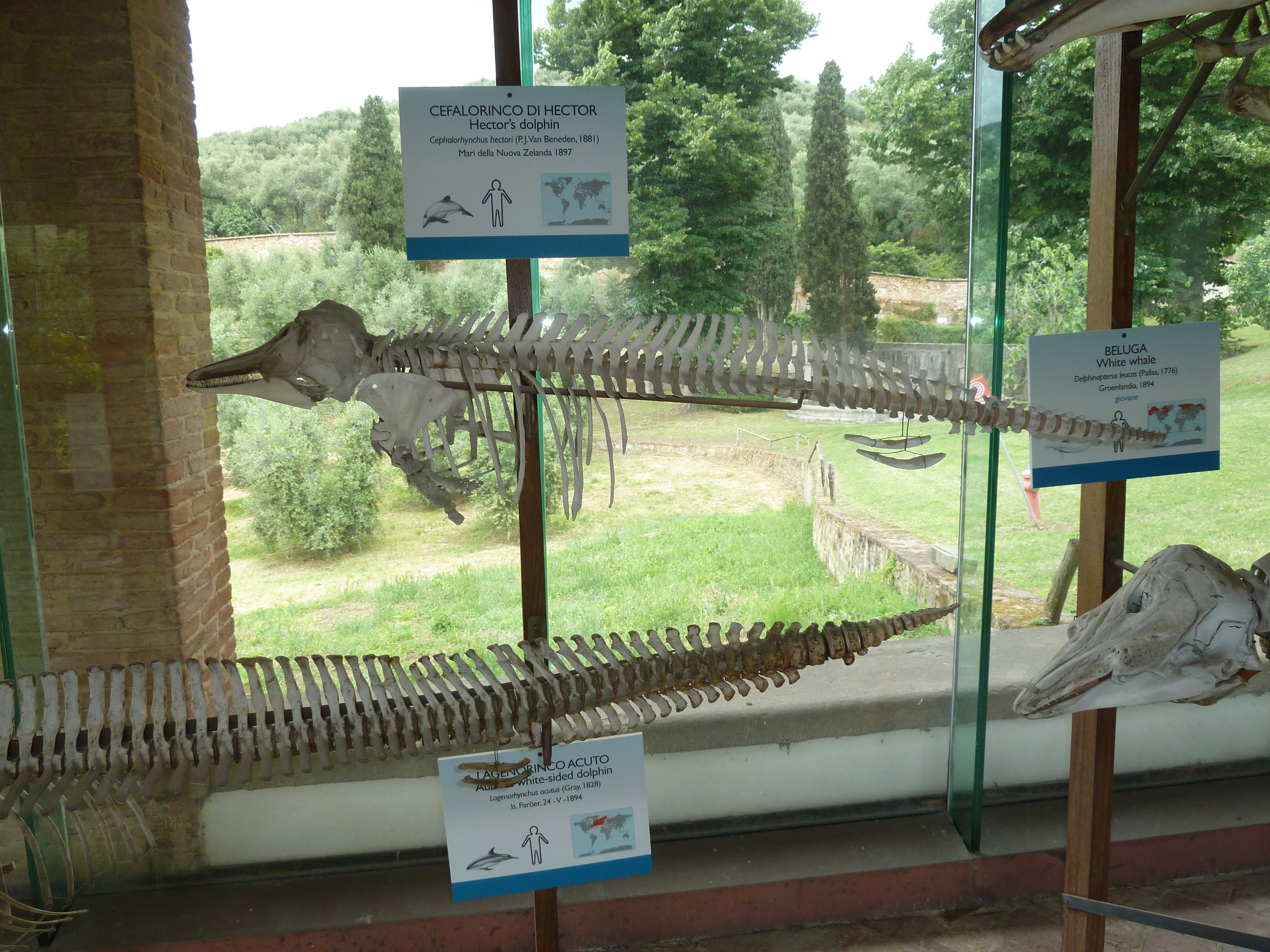
Skeleton in the collection of the Pisa Charterhouse

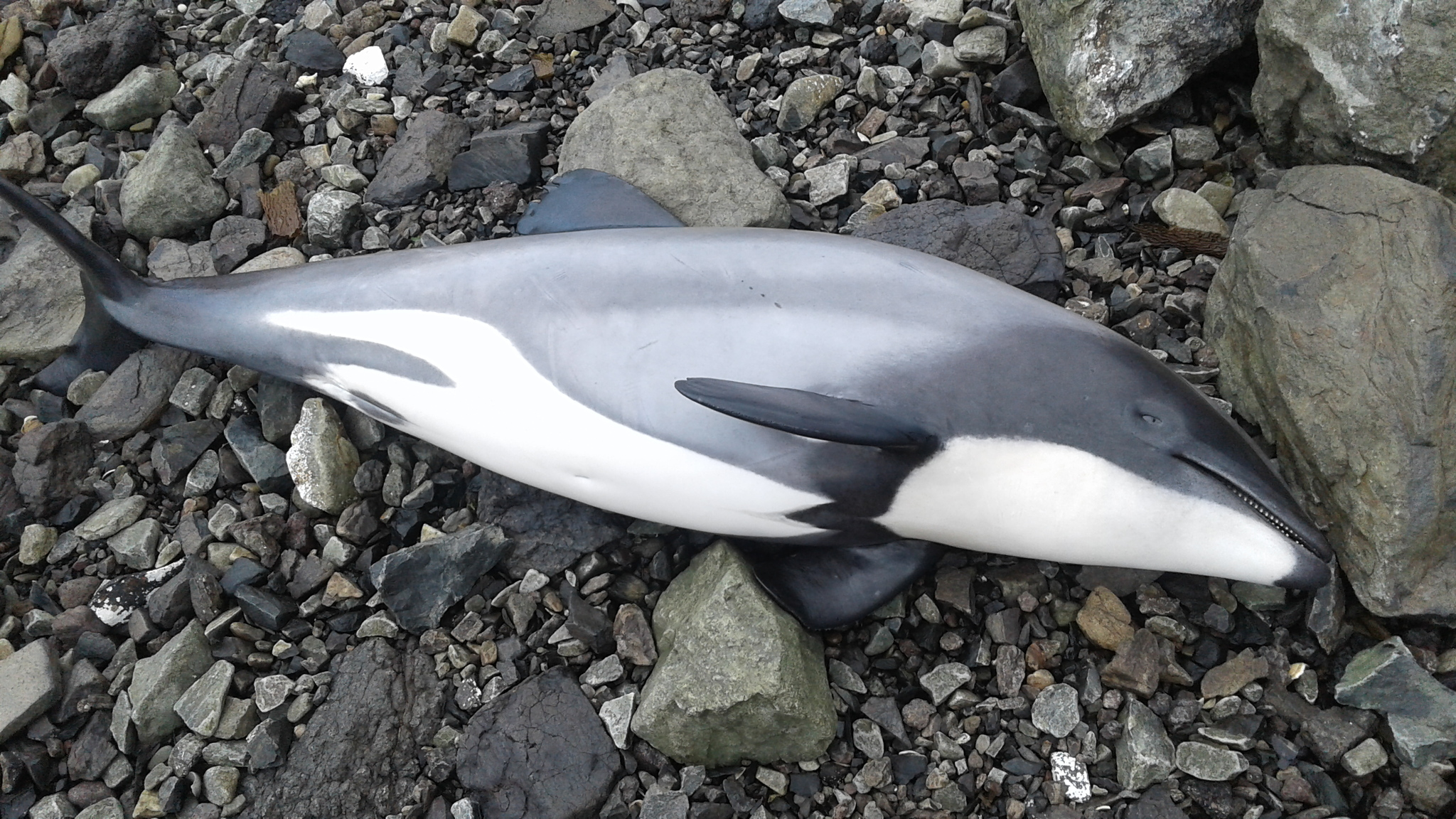
In Otago, New Zealand

=== Fishing ===
Hector's and Māui dolphin deaths occur as a direct result of commercial and recreational fishing due to entanglement or capture in gillnets or trawls. The species' reliance on shallow areas for foraging brings it in frequent contact with intensive fishing operations. Death is ultimately caused by suffocation, although injury and sub-lethal effects can also result from the mechanical abrasion of fins resulting from entanglement. Since the 1970s, gillnets have been made from lightweight monofilament, which is difficult for dolphins to detect. Hector's dolphins are actively attracted to trawling vessels and can frequently be seen following trawlers and diving down to the net, which could result in the unwanted bycatch.

Deaths in fishing nets were previously considered to be the most serious threat (responsible for more than 95% of the human-caused deaths in Māui dolphins), with currently lower level threats including tourism, disease, and marine mining. Research of decreases in mitochondrial DNA diversity among hector's dolphin populations has suggested that the number of gill-net entanglement deaths likely far surpasses that reported by fisheries. Population simulations estimated that the current population is 30% of the 1970 population size estimate of 50,000 dolphins, based on their estimated capture rate in commercial gillnet fisheries.

The latest government-approved estimates of annual deaths in commercial gillnets (for the period from 2014/15 to 2016/17) was 19–93 South Island Hector's dolphins and 0.0–0.3 Māui dolphins annually. The low estimate for Māui dolphin deaths in gillnets is consistent with the lack of any observed captures in commercial setnets off the West Coast of the North Island since late 2012, despite 100% observer coverage in this fishery across this time period. Annual deaths in commercial trawls were estimated to be 0.2–26.6 Hector's dolphins and 0.00–0.05 Maui dolphins (from 2014/15 to 2016/17). Based on these levels of mortality, the increased abundance of Hector's dolphins and faster population growth potential than previously thought, the commercial fishery threat (alone) would be unlikely to prevent population recovery to at least 80% of unaffected levels, for either Hector's or Māui dolphins. However the threat from commercial fishing was estimated to be higher for some regional populations relative to others, e.g., East Coast South Island, and may have a greater effect on certain smaller populations, e.g., South Island Hector's dolphins along the Kaikōura Coast.

==== Fishing restrictions ====
The first marine protected area (MPA) for Hector's dolphin was designated in 1988 at Banks Peninsula, where commercial gill-netting was effectively prohibited out to 4 nmi (7.4 km; 4.6 mi) offshore and recreational gill-netting was subject to seasonal restrictions. A second MPA was designated on the west coast of the North Island in 2003. Populations continued to decline due to by-catch outside the MPAs.

Additional protection was introduced in 2008, banning gill-netting within 4 nautical miles of the majority of the South Island's east and south coasts, out to 2 nautical miles (3.7 km) offshore off the South Island's west coast and extending the gillnet ban on the North Island's west coast to 7 nmi (13 km; 8.1 mi) offshore. Also, restrictions were placed on trawling in some of these areas. For further details on these regulations, see the Ministry of Fisheries website. Five marine mammal sanctuaries were designated in 2008 to manage nonfishing-related threats to Hector's and Māui dolphins. Their regulations include restrictions on mining and seismic acoustic surveys. Further restrictions were introduced into Taranaki waters in 2012 and 2013 to protect Māui dolphins.

The Banks Peninsula Marine Mammal Sanctuary was expanded in 2020, with restrictions introduced on seismic surveying and seabed mining. The sanctuary stretches from the Jed River south to the Waitaki River, and extends 20 nautical miles out to sea, a total area of about 14,310 km^{2}.

The Scientific Committee of the International Whaling Commission has recommended extending protection for Māui dolphin further south to Whanganui and further offshore to 20 nautical miles from the coastline. The IUCN has recommended protecting Hector's and Māui dolphins from gill-net and trawl fisheries, from the shoreline to the 100 m depth contour. Sustainable fishing practices could also reduce the impacts of fishing on Hector's dolphins and other species.

=== Infectious diseases ===
The unicellular parasiteToxoplasma gondii is considered to be the main non-fishery cause of death. A 2013 study found that seven of 28 beachcast or bycaught Hector's and Māui dolphins died as a result of toxoplasmosis, which had necrotising and haemorrhagic lesions in the lung (n = 7), lymph nodes (n = 6), liver (n = 4) and adrenals (n = 3). The same study found that approximately two-thirds of dolphins had previously been infected with the toxoplasma parasite. An update to this study found that toxoplasmosis had killed nine out of 38 post-weaning age Hector's and Māui dolphins found washed up or floating at-sea, and that were not too autolised to determine a cause of death. Of these nine, six were reproductive females, tentatively indicating that this demographic may be more susceptible to infection. In New Zealand, the domestic house cat is the only known definitive host for toxoplasma, and Hector's and Maui dolphins are thought to become infected as a result of their preference for turbid coastal waters near river mouths, where toxoplasma oocyst densities are likely to be relatively high.

Brucellosis is a notable bacterial disease of Hector's and Māui dolphins that can cause late pregnancy abortion in terrestrial mammals, and has been found in a range of cetacean species elsewhere. Brucellosis has been determined from necropsies to have killed both Hector's and Māui dolphins and to have caused reproductive disease, indicating that it may affect the reproductive success of both sub-species.

=== Loss of genetic diversity and population decline ===
The high levels of sex segregation and fragmentation of different populations in Hector's dolphin have been discussed as contributing to the overall population decline, as it becomes more difficult for males to find a female and copulate. The Allee effect begins to occur when a low-density population has low reproductive rates leading to increased population decline. In addition, low gene flow between populations may result from this species' high foraging site fidelity. Hector's dolphins have not been found to participate in alongshore migrations, which may also contribute to their lack of genetic diversity.

Samples from 1870 to today have provided a historical timeline for the species' population decline. Lack of neighbouring populations due to fishery-related mortality has decreased gene flow and contributed to an overall loss in mitochondrial DNA diversity. As a result, the populations have become fragmented and isolated, leading to inbreeding. The geographical range has been lessened to the point where gene flow and immigration may no longer be possible between Māui dolphin and Hector's dolphin.

Potential interbreeding between Hector's and Māui dolphins could increase the numbers of dolphins in the Māui range and reduce the risk of inbreeding depression, but such interbreeding could eventually result in a hybridisation of the Māui back into the Hector's species and lead to a reclassification of Māui as again the North Island Hector's. Hybridisation in this manner threatens the Otago black stilt and the Chatham Islands' Forbes parakeet and has eliminated the South Island brown teal as a subspecies. Researchers have also identified potential interbreeding as threatening the Māui with hybrid breakdown and outbreeding depression.

Additional threats to Hector's dolphins include oil spills, gas drilling, and noise pollution.

== See also ==
- Endangered species
- List of cetaceans
- Mammals of New Zealand
