= Porpoise Bay =

Porpoise Bay can refer to:

- Porpoise Bay, Antarctica
- Porpoise Bay (New Zealand)
- Porpoise Bay Provincial Park, Canada
