= Porpoise Bay (New Zealand) =

Bay on the southern coast of New Zealand's South Island

Coordinates: 46°40′S 169°07′E

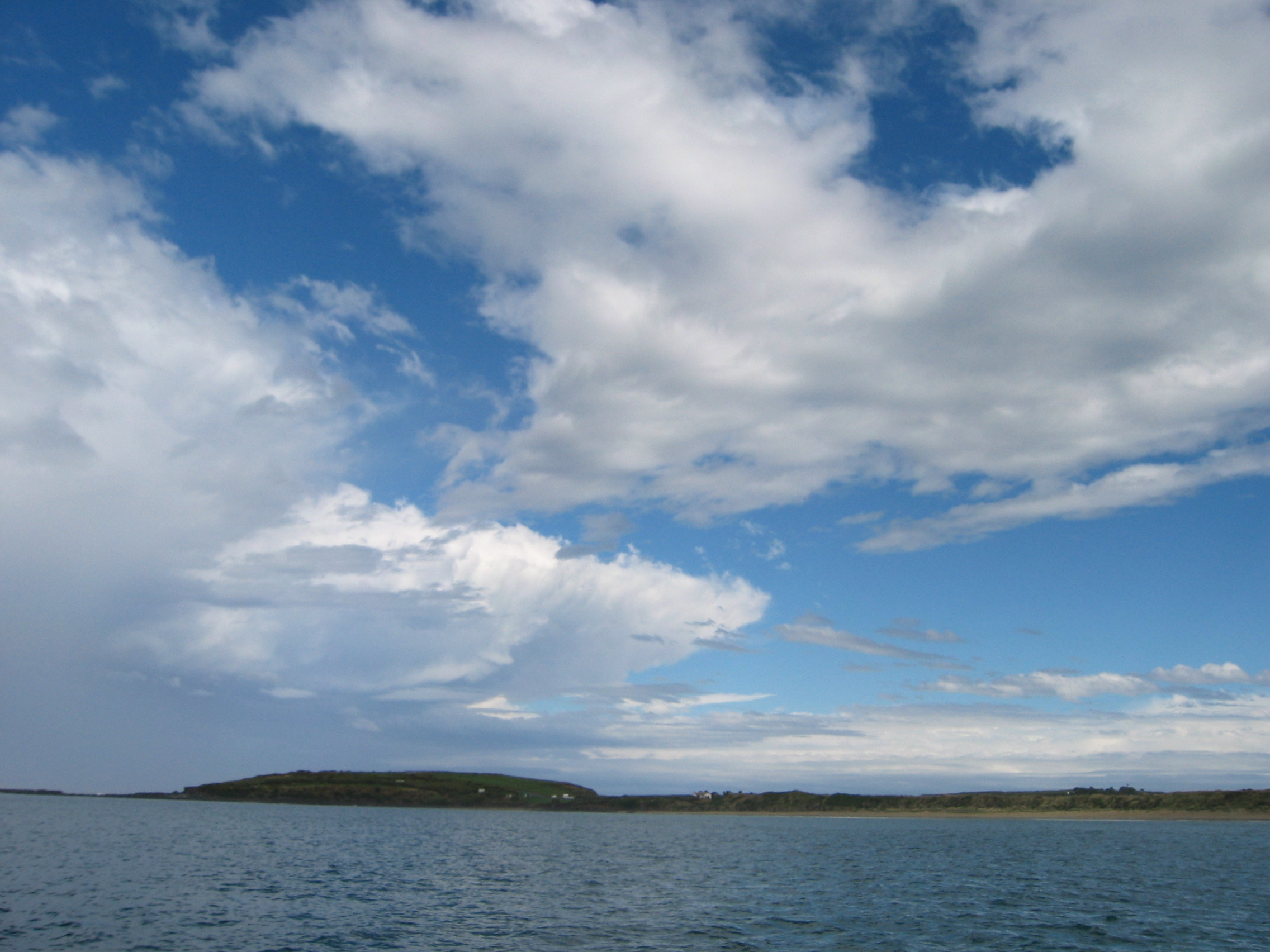
Looking across Porpoise Bay to South Head

Porpoise Bay is in the Catlins, on the southern coast of New Zealand's South Island. The bay sweeps gently from North Head, at the entrance to Waikawa Harbour, around to South Head. A campground overlooking the bay is situated on South Head, which separates Porpoise Bay from Curio Bay.

A small population of endangered Hector's dolphins can often be found in the bay feeding, resting and socializing during the summer. Commercial dolphin watching tours no longer operate in Porpoise Bay, however the dolphins can often be seen from the beach. In order to limit disturbance to the dolphins, it is recommended that swimmers enter the water at least 50 m away from dolphins, do not attempt to feed or attract them, and let any interaction be on their terms. A 5 kt speed limit applies to boats, and jetskis are not allowed in Porpoise Bay. In 2007, the Department of Conservation proposed including the bay in a group of new sanctuaries designed to protect marine mammals, some calling for a complete ban on set nets. Local fishermen protested, fearing for their livelihood.

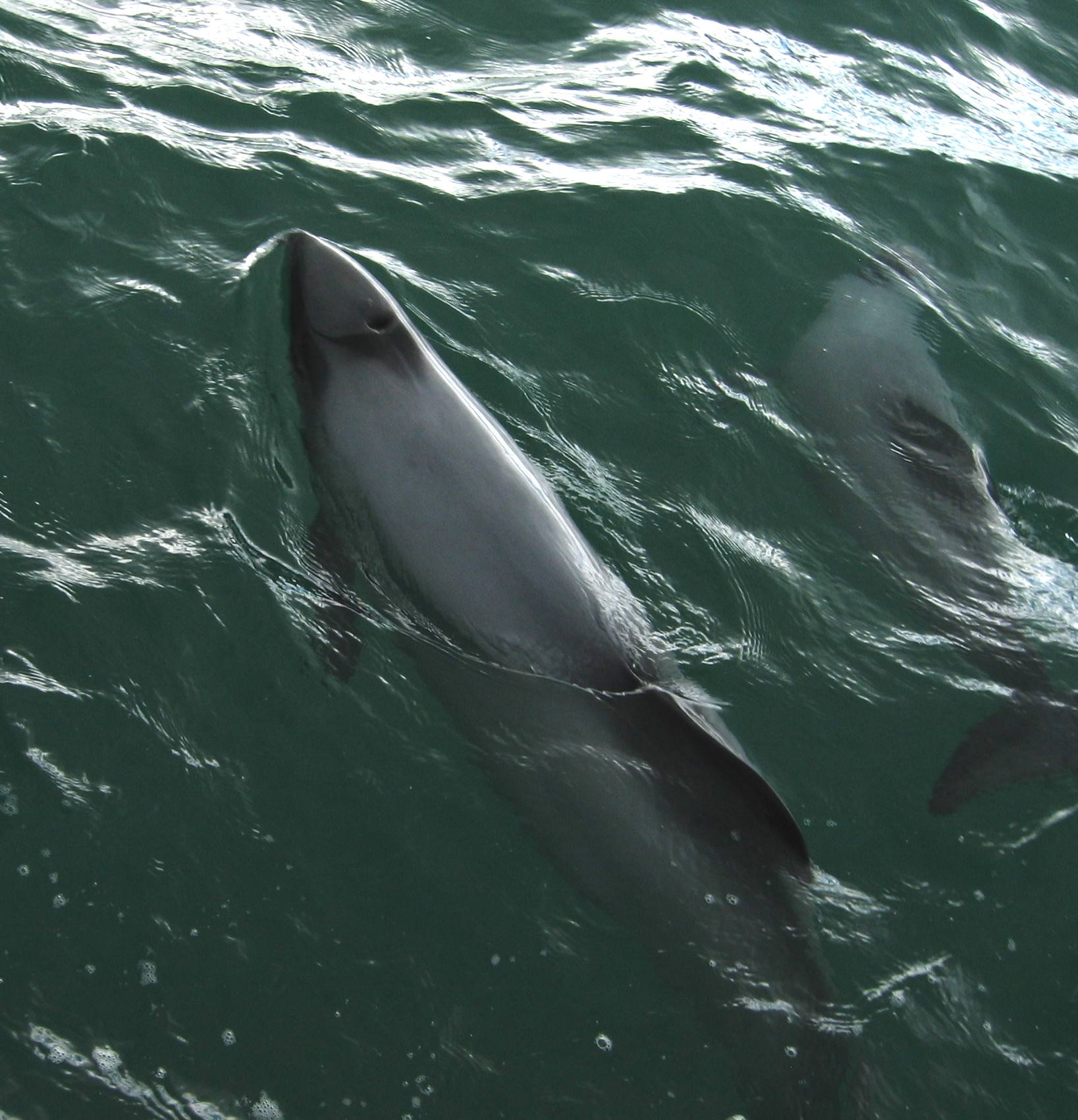
Hector's dolphins at Porpoise Bay

Other notable wildlife regularly seen are yellow-eyed penguin, blue penguin, New Zealand fur seal, and New Zealand sea lion.
