= Maunganui Bluff =

Coastal bluff in Northland, New Zealand

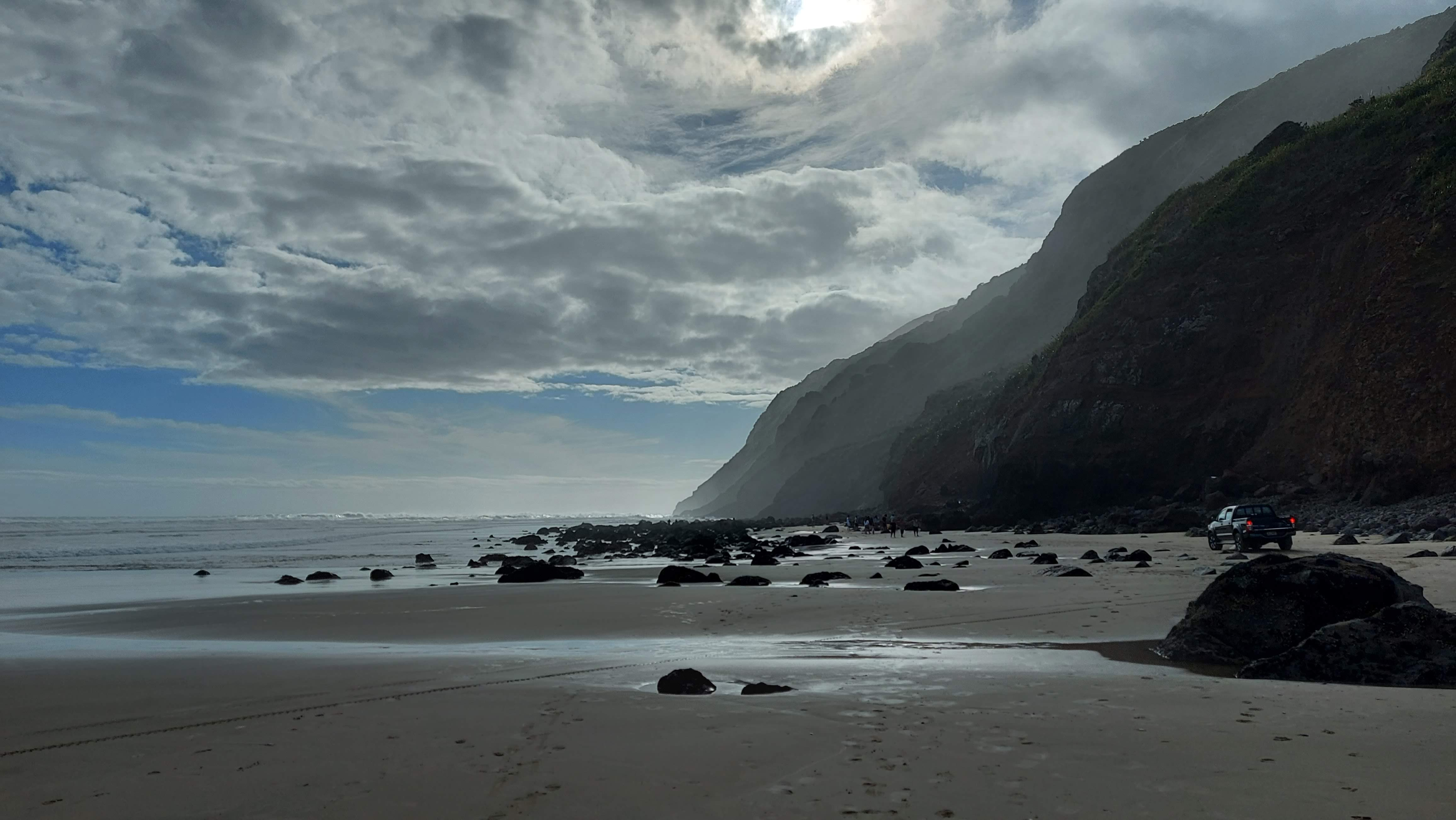
- Maunganui Bluff viewed looking north from Ripiro Beach

Highest point
- Elevation: 459 m (1,506 ft)
- Coordinates: 35°45′29″S 173°33′44″E

Geography
- Country: New Zealand
- Region: Northland Region

Maunganui Bluff is a prominent coastal bluff located on the west coast of New Zealand's North Island, in the Northland region. Known locally as The Bluff, it is set in a 495 hectares (1,220 acres) scenic reserve and rises 459 metres (1,506 ft) above sea level.

Maunganui Bluff marks the northern extent of 107 kilometres (66 mi) long Ripiro Beach (the longest unbroken beach in New Zealand).

== Etymology ==
Maunganui in Māori means big mountain.

== Geology ==
Studies using remote sensing indicate these basalt layers form part of an eroded basalt shield volcano, originally centered about 10 kilometers west of Maunganui Bluff, with an estimated width of 50 kilometers. Comparatively, other Miocene basalt shield volcanoes, such as those at Banks Peninsula, Dunedin, and the Auckland Islands, each spanned roughly 20 to 30 kilometers.

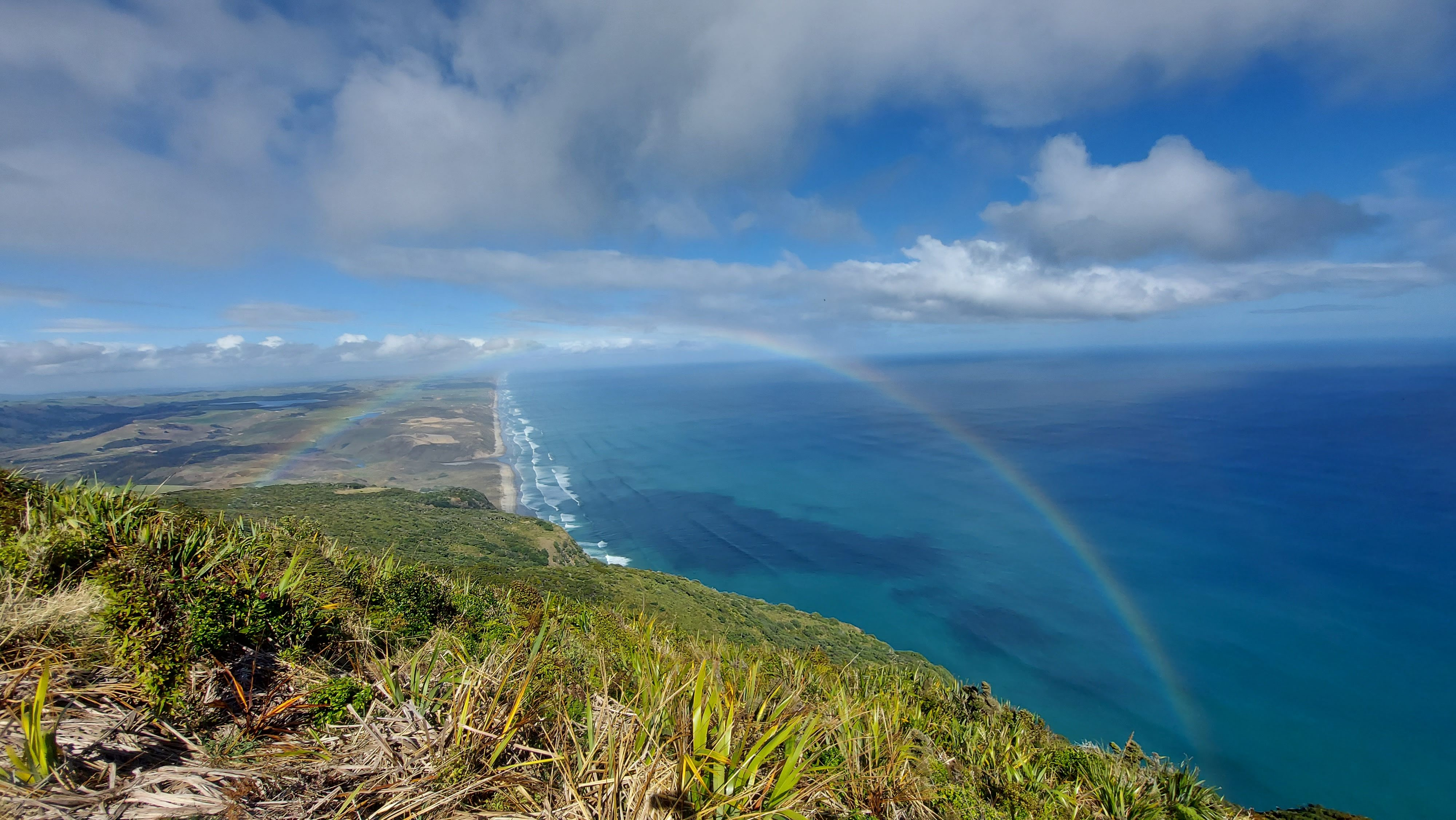
View from Maunganui Bluff looking South along Ripiro Beach

Maunganui Bluff and the Waipoua Forest region are primarily composed of Early Miocene basalt flows that include pyroclastic deposits, volcanic breccia, dikes and breccia dikes. This local formation is referred to as Waipoua Basalt.

Maunganui Bluff consists of layered basalt flows between 2 and 10 meters thick, interspersed with thin beds of rubbly breccia and oxidized volcanic ash. Numerous vertical dikes, formed from intruding basalt lava, cut through these layers, representing fractures within the ancient Waipoua shield volcano during its formation.
