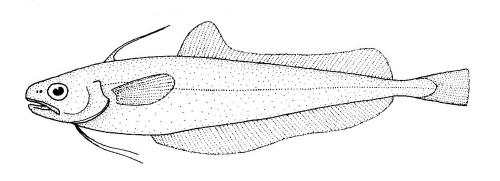

Scientific classification
- Kingdom: Animalia
- Phylum: Chordata
- Class: Actinopterygii
- Division: Teleostei
- Order: Gadiformes
- Family: Moridae
- Genus: Auchenoceros; Günther, 1889
- Species: A. punctatus

Binomial name
- Auchenoceros punctatus (F. W. Hutton, 1873)

Synonyms
- Calloptilum punctatum Hutton, 1873; Bregmaceros punctatus (Hutton, 1873)

= Āhuru =

Ahuru

Genus of fishes

The āhuru (Auchenoceros punctatus; Māori pronunciation: [aː.hu.ɾu]) is a species of morid cod found in waters off the eastern coast of New Zealand and to the south as well as in the Cook Strait. It is found at depths from 5 to 420 m (16 to 1,378 ft). This species grows to 13 cm (5.1 in) in total length. It is the only known species of its genus.
