= List of curling clubs in New Zealand =

This is a list of curling clubs in New Zealand. The vast majority of these clubs are based in the southern South Island, with most of them being in Central Otago. Only two of the listed teams are from the North Island (both in Auckland).

- Alexandra Curling Club – Alexandra
- Alpine Curling Club – Lauder
- Arrow Curling Club – Arrowtown
- Auckland Curling Club – Auckland
- Balmoral Curling Club – Ranfurly
- Becks Curling Club – Becks
- Black Ice Curling Club – Timaru
- Blackstone Hill Curling Club – Oturehua
- Cambrian Curling Club – Alexandra
- Cardrona Curling Club – Wānaka
- Chatto Creek Curling Club – Alexandra
- Curling Canterbury – Christchurch
- Dunedin Curling Club – Dunedin
- Dunedin Country Curling Club – Dunedin
- Dunstan Creek Curling Club – Omakau
- Garibaldi Curling Club – Ranfurly
- Gore Curling Club – Gore
- Hamiltons Curling Club – Ranfurly
- Kiwi Curling Club – Naseby
- Kyeburn Curling Club – Ranfurly
- Lauder Curling Club – Lauder
- Lowburn Curling Club – Cromwell
- Mackenzie Curling Club – Fairlie
- Manorburn Curling Club – Alexandra
- Metro Jets – Auckland
- Mount Ida Curling Club – Ranfurly
- Naseby Curling Club – Naseby
- Otago Central Curling Club – Naseby
- Oturehua Curling Club – Oturehua
- Pioneer Curling Club – Naseby
- Poolburn Curling Club – Poolburn
- Ranfurly Curling Club – Ranfurly
- Rough Ridge Curling Club – Oturehua
- Serpentine Curling Club – Paerau
- Upper Manuherikia Curling Club – Omakau
- Wedderburn Curling Club – Ranfurly
- West Coast Curling Club - Greymouth
- Whitestone Curling Club – Oamaru
- Windwhistle Curling Club – Windwhistle
