= Ida Valley =

Coordinates: 45.05°S 169.82°E

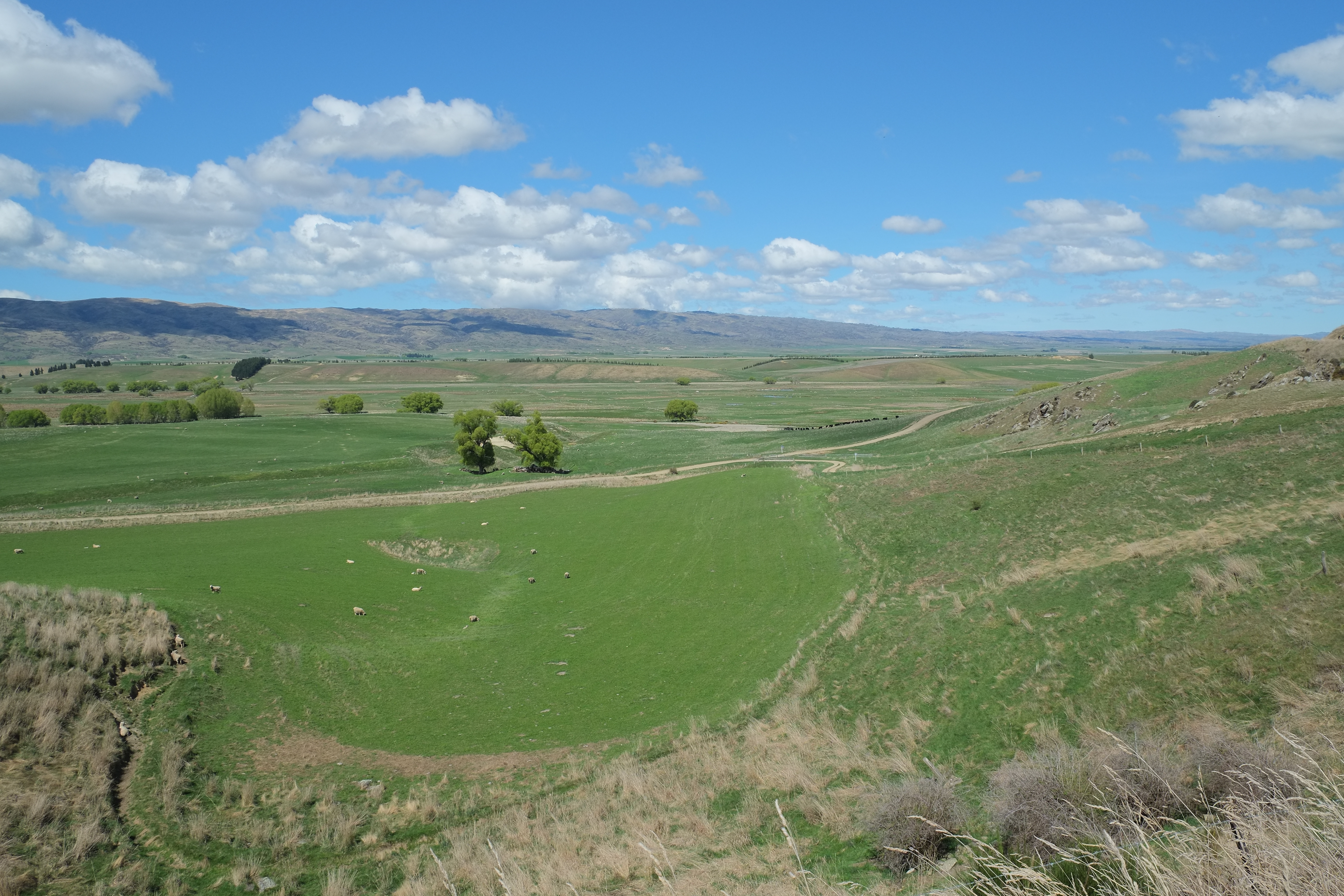
View over Ida Valley in spring

The Ida Valley lies east of the Manuherikia Valley in Central Otago, New Zealand. At an altitude of around 500 m (1,600 ft), the 40 km long flat and wide valley is a relatively dry region with cold winters and hot summers, much like the rest of Central Otago. Most agricultural production in the Ida Valley is lamb, including merino, and stud cattle.

The valley is named after the Idaburn. Idaburn flows from Mount Ida in the Ida Range, through the northern section of the Ida Valley, breaks through Raggedy Ridge through the Poolburn Gorge and into Manuherikia River. The Idaburn is joined by the Pool Burn (which drains the valley's southern section) shortly before entering the Poolburn Gorge.

The largest settlement in the sparsely populated Ida Valley is Oturehua, a small village at the northern end. Other localities include "Moa Creek", "Poolburn", "Ida Valley" and "Idaburn" which are groups of a few houses and farms rather than villages. Poolburn is the location of the local full primary school.

The Ida Valley Omakau Road leads through much of the valley, starting at the locality Idaburn beside State Highway 85 at the northern end, through Oturehua, the Ida Valley locality towards the centre, the Poolburn locality at the southern end and on to Omakau in the Manuherikia Valley, also on State Highway 85.

== Tourism ==
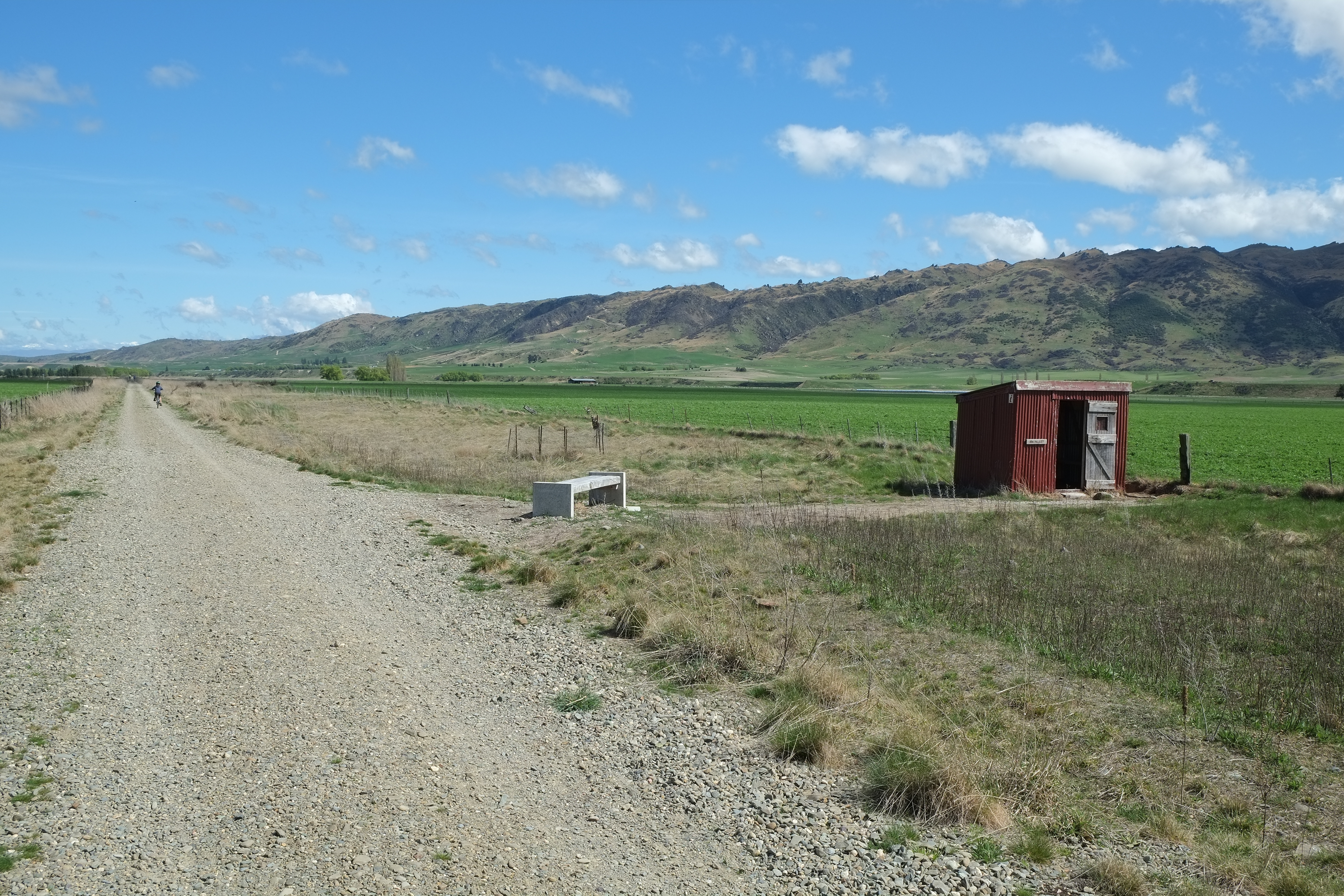
Otago Central Rail Trail at Ida Valley

The valley has a rich gold mining heritage, with remnants of mines and workings on display in and around Oturehua.

The Otago Central Rail Trail leads through much of the Ida Valley from Idaburn through to the Poolburn Gorge, a scenic section of this cycle trail encompassing two viaducts as well as two tunnels. Local operators provide bike hire and coach transport for day trips of varying length between Oturehua and Omakau. Oturehua also provides accommodation options for multi-day bike trips on the rail trail.

== The Power Of The Dog ==
Braeside, a 5500 hectare sheep and cattle farm in the Ida Valley, owned by brothers Al and Graeme McKnight and Philippa Pope, was used for the filming of the movie The Power of the Dog, which starred Benedict Cumberbatch, Kirsten Dunst, Jesse Plemons, Kodi Smit-McPhee and Keith Carradine.

Director Jane Campion chose the venue as the sparsely populated, grassy plains and rocky mountains of Central Otago matched Montana, where the movie was set. Pre-production preparation included construction of a Western-style barn, homestead, cattle corral, cowboy quarters and saloon.

The movie was nominated for twelve Academy Awards in 2022 and Jane Campion was awarded the Academy Award for Best Director.

== Climate ==
Climate data for Ida Valley (Moa Creek), elevation 427 m (1,401 ft), (1957–1984)
Month	Jan	Feb	Mar	Apr	May	Jun	Jul	Aug	Sep	Oct	Nov	Dec	Year
Record high °C (°F)	34.1 (93.4)	33.5 (92.3)	29.5 (85.1)	25.5 (77.9)	19.8 (67.6)	16.9 (62.4)	15.3 (59.5)	18.2 (64.8)	22.0 (71.6)	24.7 (76.5)	29.0 (84.2)	31.3 (88.3)	34.1 (93.4)
Mean maximum °C (°F)	29.7 (85.5)	29.2 (84.6)	26.1 (79.0)	21.8 (71.2)	17.5 (63.5)	13.3 (55.9)	12.2 (54.0)	15.6 (60.1)	18.6 (65.5)	22.2 (72.0)	24.6 (76.3)	27.5 (81.5)	30.8 (87.4)
Mean daily maximum °C (°F)	22.2 (72.0)	22.4 (72.3)	19.6 (67.3)	15.8 (60.4)	10.5 (50.9)	6.7 (44.1)	6.4 (43.5)	9.8 (49.6)	13.4 (56.1)	16.0 (60.8)	18.2 (64.8)	20.9 (69.6)	15.2 (59.3)
Daily mean °C (°F)	14.7 (58.5)	14.7 (58.5)	12.3 (54.1)	8.4 (47.1)	3.9 (39.0)	1.2 (34.2)	1.1 (34.0)	3.4 (38.1)	6.2 (43.2)	9.0 (48.2)	11.2 (52.2)	13.7 (56.7)	8.3 (47.0)
Mean daily minimum °C (°F)	7.1 (44.8)	6.9 (44.4)	5.0 (41.0)	0.9 (33.6)	−2.7 (27.1)	−4.4 (24.1)	−4.2 (24.4)	−3.1 (26.4)	−1.0 (30.2)	2.0 (35.6)	4.2 (39.6)	6.5 (43.7)	1.4 (34.6)
Mean minimum °C (°F)	−0.4 (31.3)	−1.0 (30.2)	−2.7 (27.1)	−6.0 (21.2)	−9.4 (15.1)	−9.6 (14.7)	−9.8 (14.4)	−8.1 (17.4)	−6.8 (19.8)	−4.9 (23.2)	−3.7 (25.3)	−1.2 (29.8)	−10.9 (12.4)
Record low °C (°F)	−3.0 (26.6)	−4.5 (23.9)	−5.8 (21.6)	−8.6 (16.5)	−12.3 (9.9)	−12.4 (9.7)	−16.8 (1.8)	−10.9 (12.4)	−10.6 (12.9)	−7.5 (18.5)	−7.5 (18.5)	−4.5 (23.9)	−16.8 (1.8)
Average rainfall mm (inches)	49.0 (1.93)	37.0 (1.46)	41.5 (1.63)	34.8 (1.37)	30.7 (1.21)	25.0 (0.98)	20.0 (0.79)	20.3 (0.80)	25.0 (0.98)	36.8 (1.45)	36.5 (1.44)	44.4 (1.75)	401 (15.79)
Source: Earth Sciences NZ (rainfall 1913–1984)
