= Ophir, New Zealand =

Settlement in Central Otago, New Zealand

Ophir
- Rural locality
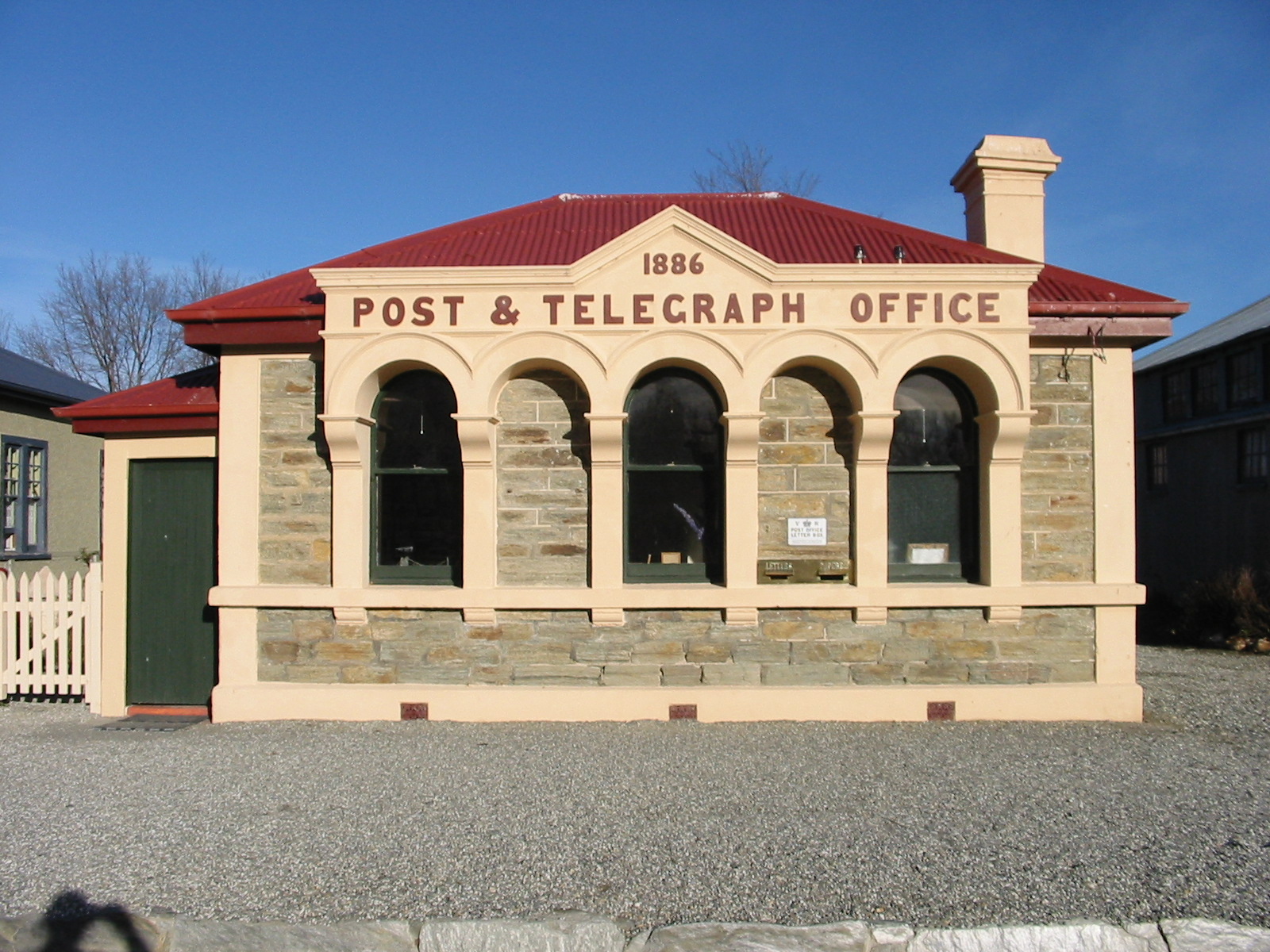
- Ophir Post and Telegraph Office
- Interactive map of Ophir
- Coordinates: 45°07′S 169°36′E
- Country: New Zealand
- Region: Otago
- Territorial authority: Central Otago District
- Ward: Vincent Ward

Government
  - Local authority: Central Otago District Council
  - Regional council: Otago Regional Council
- Time zone: UTC+12 (NZST)
  - Summer (DST): UTC+13 (NZDT)
- Local iwi: Ngāi Tahu

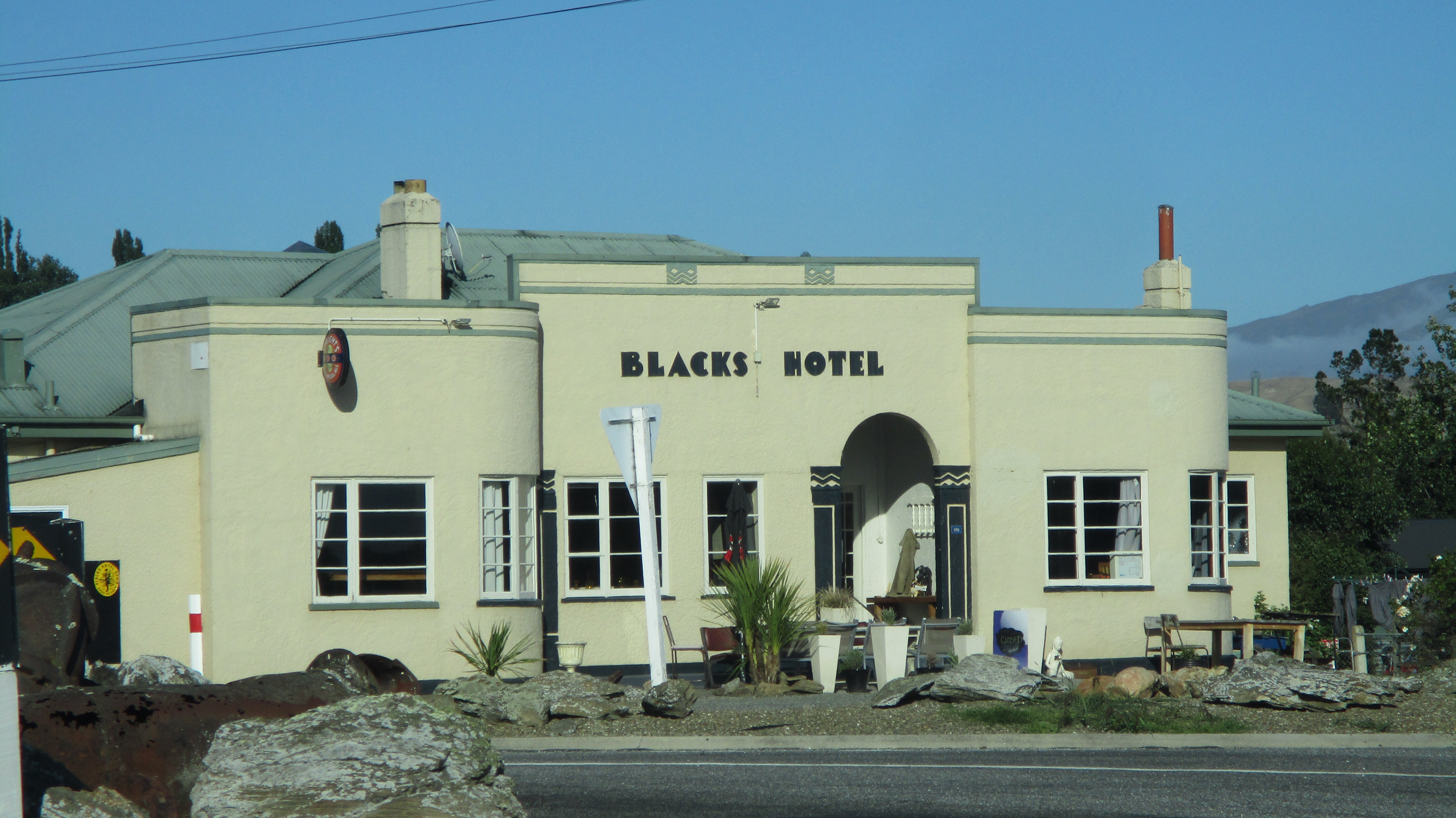
Blacks Hotel

Ophir, originally known as Blacks, is a small settlement in Central Otago, New Zealand, located 23 km (14 mi) northeast of Alexandra, close to the east bank of the Manuherikia River. The settlement of Omakau is located on the opposite bank, 1.5 kilometres (0.93 mi) to the northwest.

Ophir was originally known as Blacks, when gold was discovered in Central Otago in 1861. Ophir's population grew to over 1,000 as it became the commercial and social centre of the district. It was renamed Ophir at this time, after the place name of the legendary "King Solomon's Goldmines" where King Solomon obtained the gold to sheath the Temple in Jerusalem.

One of the access routes to Ophir passes across the Manuherikia River to the west of the settlement, over a historic single lane road bridge known as the Daniel O'Connell Bridge. It is a suspension bridge spanning 65.5 m (215 ft) using steel suspension cables and masonry towers built from schist. The bridge was constructed between 1879 and 1880. It was named after the Irish hero, Daniel O’Connell (1775–1847), a name chosen because at the time, the area had a large population of Irish Catholic immigrants. The bridge is classified by Heritage New Zealand as a Category 1 Historic Place.

When the Otago Central Railway was constructed in 1906, it was routed through Omakau and bypassed Ophir. This had a positive effect for Omakau, which thrived, but a negative effect on Ophir which saw a considerable loss in population.

Today, with a current population of around 50, the town is also known for the many original buildings still surviving including the restored Post and Telegraph Office, the 1895 Courthouse, and the 1870s Police Station. The Post Office is a schist and stone masonry structure built in 1886, and registered by Heritage New Zealand as a Category I Historic Place (List number 341, 22 November 1984).

Ophir is a visitor attraction and provides accommodation for users of the Otago Central Rail Trail that passes close to the town.

New Zealand's second-lowest official temperature of -21.6 °C was recorded at Ophir on 3 July 1995, even though it is not located at a high elevation.

== Demographics ==
Ophir is considered by Statistics New Zealand to be a part of the Omakau rural settlement, which is itself part of the much larger Manuherikia-Ida Valleys statistical area.

== Climate ==
Climate data for Ophir, elevation 305 m (1,001 ft), (1991–2020 normals, extremes 1924–present)
Month	Jan	Feb	Mar	Apr	May	Jun	Jul	Aug	Sep	Oct	Nov	Dec	Year
Record high °C (°F)	35.2 (95.4)	35.1 (95.2)	31.6 (88.9)	26.8 (80.2)	24.5 (76.1)	20.3 (68.5)	18.0 (64.4)	22.3 (72.1)	25.4 (77.7)	27.7 (81.9)	31.0 (87.8)	34.4 (93.9)	35.2 (95.4)
Mean maximum °C (°F)	30.6 (87.1)	30.1 (86.2)	27.7 (81.9)	23.3 (73.9)	19.8 (67.6)	16.2 (61.2)	15.3 (59.5)	17.4 (63.3)	20.7 (69.3)	23.9 (75.0)	26.4 (79.5)	28.8 (83.8)	31.8 (89.2)
Mean daily maximum °C (°F)	23.6 (74.5)	23.5 (74.3)	21.0 (69.8)	16.8 (62.2)	12.8 (55.0)	8.5 (47.3)	8.1 (46.6)	11.4 (52.5)	14.8 (58.6)	17.1 (62.8)	19.3 (66.7)	21.8 (71.2)	16.6 (61.8)
Daily mean °C (°F)	15.8 (60.4)	15.4 (59.7)	12.9 (55.2)	9.2 (48.6)	6.2 (43.2)	2.8 (37.0)	2.1 (35.8)	4.6 (40.3)	7.5 (45.5)	9.7 (49.5)	11.8 (53.2)	14.4 (57.9)	9.4 (48.9)
Mean daily minimum °C (°F)	8.1 (46.6)	7.4 (45.3)	4.8 (40.6)	1.7 (35.1)	−0.3 (31.5)	−2.9 (26.8)	−3.8 (25.2)	−2.2 (28.0)	0.2 (32.4)	2.2 (36.0)	4.3 (39.7)	7.1 (44.8)	2.2 (36.0)
Mean minimum °C (°F)	0.4 (32.7)	0.4 (32.7)	−2.1 (28.2)	−5.0 (23.0)	−6.9 (19.6)	−8.7 (16.3)	−9.0 (15.8)	−7.6 (18.3)	−5.9 (21.4)	−4.4 (24.1)	−2.7 (27.1)	0.0 (32.0)	−9.8 (14.4)
Record low °C (°F)	−2.6 (27.3)	−2.1 (28.2)	−5.6 (21.9)	−8.0 (17.6)	−14.5 (5.9)	−16.5 (2.3)	−21.6 (−6.9)	−12.8 (9.0)	−10.6 (12.9)	−6.9 (19.6)	−5.7 (21.7)	−4.1 (24.6)	−21.6 (−6.9)
Average rainfall mm (inches)	47.8 (1.88)	42.3 (1.67)	32.7 (1.29)	35.7 (1.41)	37.8 (1.49)	33.7 (1.33)	19.1 (0.75)	17.5 (0.69)	21.1 (0.83)	36.1 (1.42)	41.4 (1.63)	48.5 (1.91)	413.7 (16.3)
Source: NIWA
