= Poolburn Gorge =

Gorge in New Zealand

Coordinates: 45.053°S 169.735°E

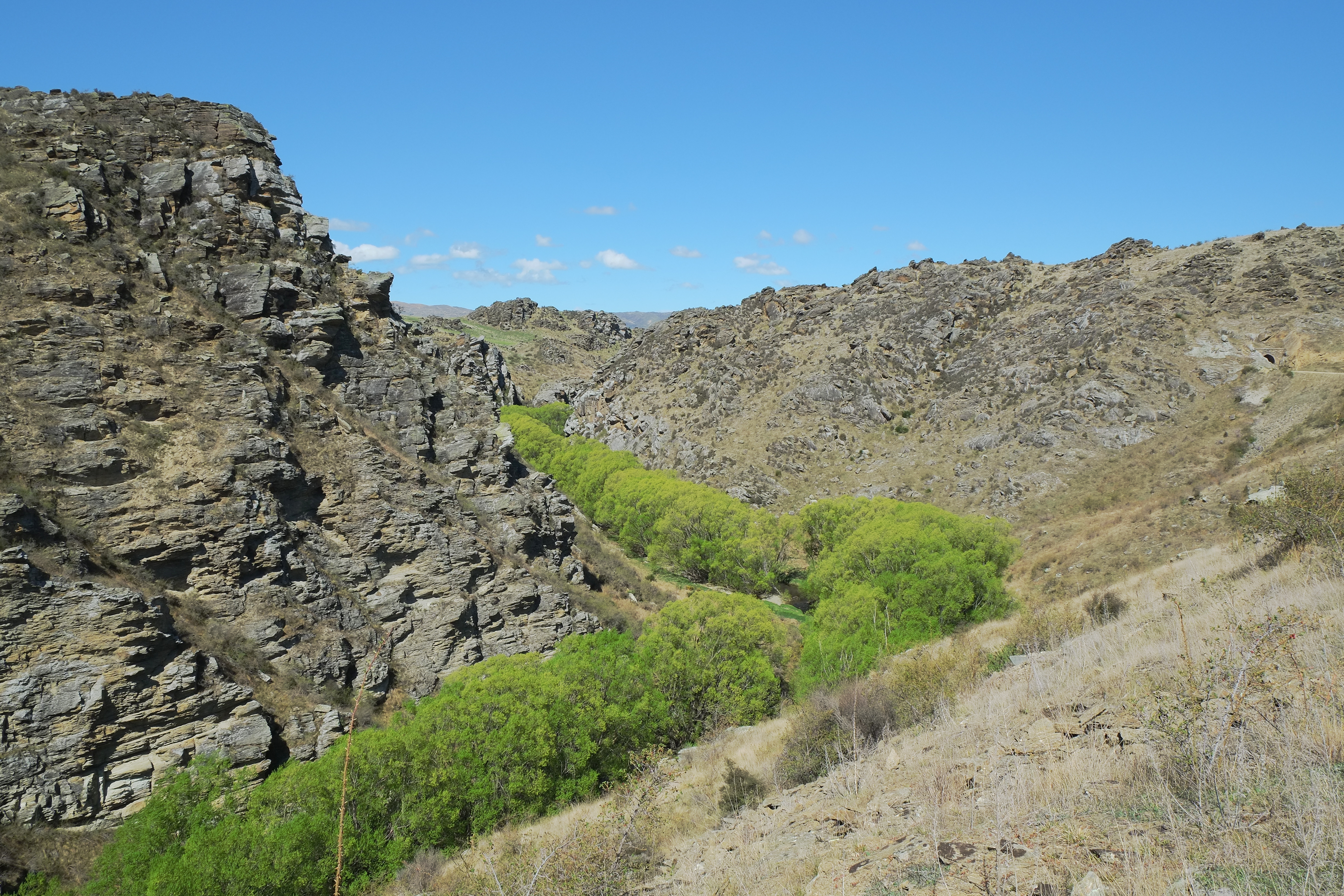
View up Poolburn Gorge in spring (Poolburn tunnel No.1 visible on the far right)

The Poolburn Gorge is a gorge located in the Central Otago region of the South Island of New Zealand, 4 km east of the small settlement of Lauder. The Ida Burn flows through the 2.5 km long canyon across the Raggedy Range between the Ida Valley and the Manuherikia Valley. There are no public roads through the gorge; only the track of the former Otago Central Railway, now used as the Otago Central Rail Trail, follows the river on the southern flanks of the gorge.

The landscape surrounding Poolburn Gorge is barren and dry, shaped by the typical Central Otago climate of dry hot summers and cold winters. The gorge cuts through schist rock bluffs, with the vegetation on the steep slopes consisting of tussock and hardy low-growing shrubs. Contrasting this, a ribbon of lush trees lines the immediate river banks at the bottom of the gorge. The Ida Burn joins the Manuherikia River shortly after it emerges from the Poolburn Gorge into the Manuherikia Valley.

The Pool Burn was known to southern Māori as Te Waipapapa o Karetai - the water container of Karetai, a Ngāi Tahu chief.

== Otago Central Railway and Rail Trail ==
The Poolburn Gorge section of the Otago Central Branch Railway encompasses two bridges and two tunnels, and gently snakes along the true left (south side) of the gorge. The construction of the railway line through the gorge took over three years, with up to 300 workers employed at the peak of construction around 1902.

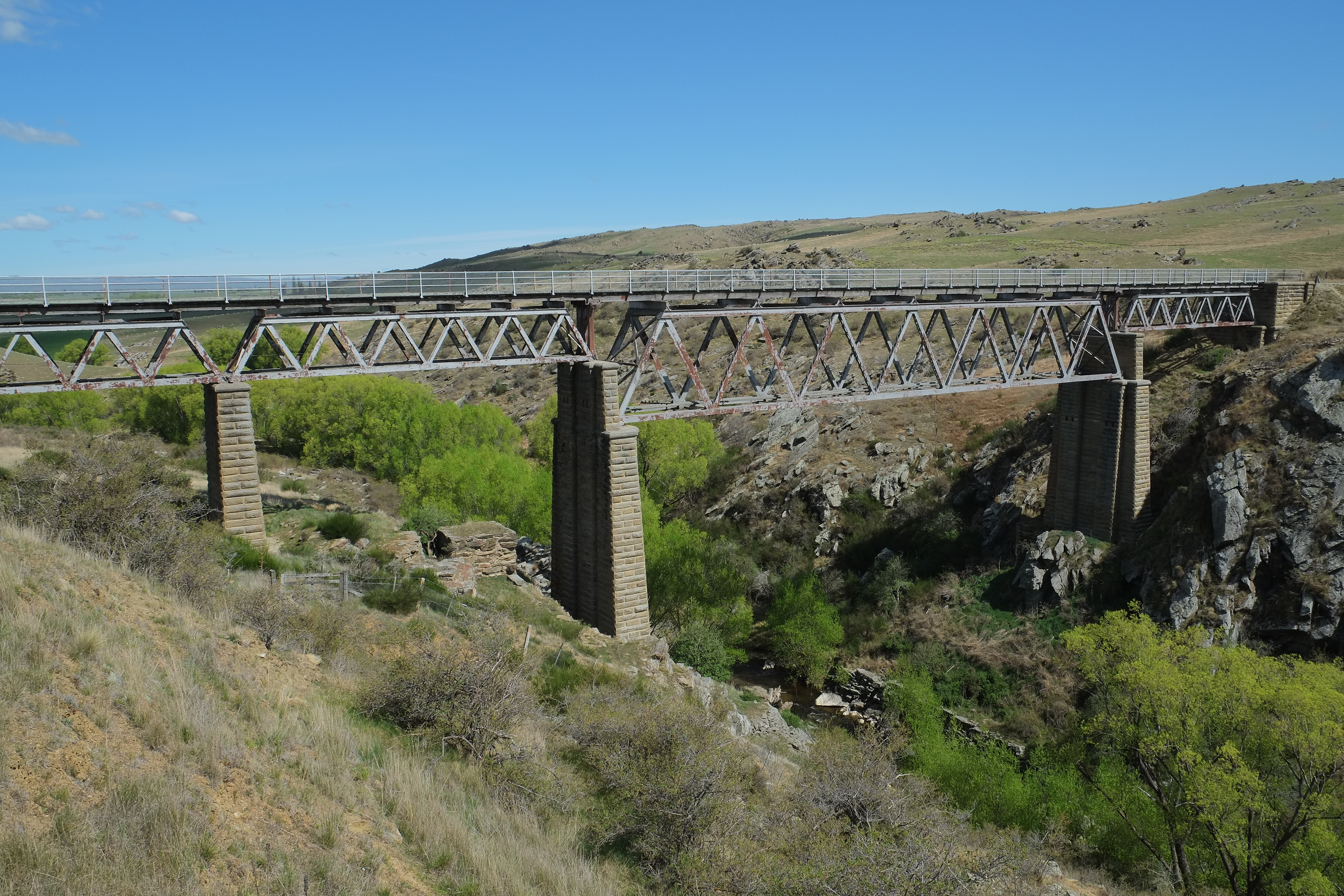
Poolburn Viaduct

At the eastern entrance to the gorge, the 37 m (121 ft) tall Poolburn Viaduct is the highest bridge on the rail line, and is bridge No.69 starting from Dunedin. Built from 1901 to 1904, the 108 m (354 ft) long viaduct was the last big masonry pier bridge with steel trusses built on the line. It has the longest center span on the Otago Central Railway at 47.5 m (156 ft) long. Schist quarried from outcrops close by was trimmed and bolstered to construct the piers and abutments with the help of large gantry hoists to lift and position the stone slabs.

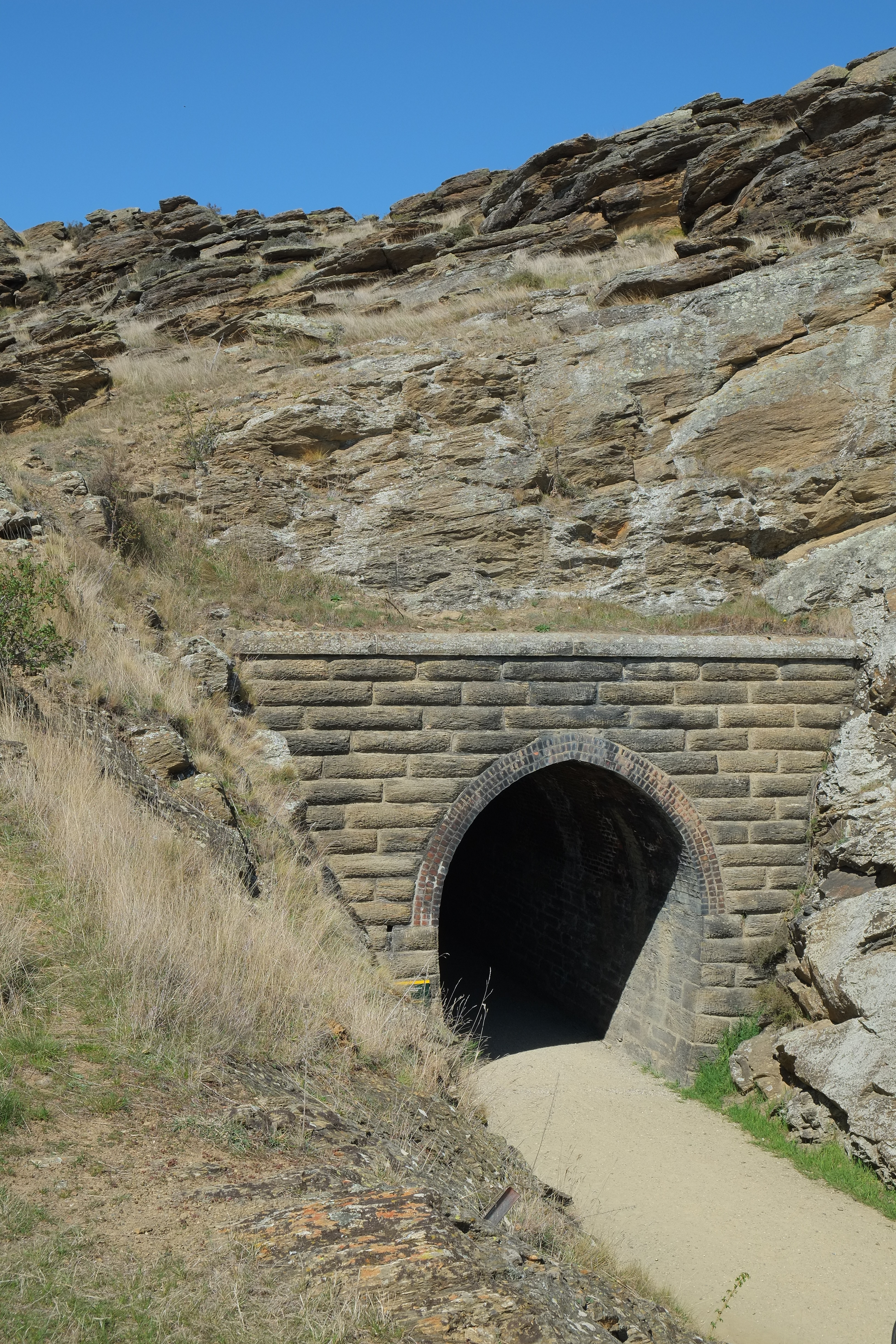
Entrance of Poolburn tunnel No.2

Shortly into the gorge, two tunnels have been cut through schist rock bluffs. Poolburn No.1 is 201 m (659 ft) long, and the curved Poolburn No.2 is the longest tunnel on the line at 229 m (751 ft) long. Torches are needed to walk or cycle through these tunnels (typically provided with hired bikes). Both tunnels feature portals with bolstered schist slab facings, with the arches outlined in brick. The inside walls of the tunnels are lined with brick about 10 m (33 ft) into the tunnels; afterwards the walls are just the bare rock.

Shortly after exiting the Poolburn Gorge, the track crosses the Manuherikia River on the 110.6 m (363 ft) long Manuherikia Bridge No.1 (number 70 on the Otago Central Railway line). This concrete pier bridge is the longest on the line and was completed in 1903. It is one of only two curved bridges on the rail trail, the other being in Hyde.

In 1990, the railway line was closed from Middlemarch onwards, which includes the Poolburn Gorge section. The tracks were lifted, and later in 2000, the line was converted to a bike trail, which included re-decking both bridges with timber and re-surfacing the track with fine gravel.

The Poolburn Gorge section of the Otago Central Railway is the most popular section of this multi-day bike track. The gorge can be traversed by bike as a day trip from Oturehua to Omakau, or in 1–2 hours from Auripo to Omakau, or as a 3-4 hour return bike trip from Omakau. Local operators in Omakau and Oturehua provide bike hire and transport, with both villages offering accommodation options as well.

The bike track gently descends through the scenic Poolburn Gorge from east to west and takes in the Poolburn Viaduct, the two tunnels cut through schist rock, and the bridge over the Manuherikia River. Just after the second tunnel, two short walking tracks can be explored - one to the bluff above the tunnel portal, the other to the remnants of a construction worker village. After the rail trail exits the gorge, it offers good views over the Manuherikia Valley and towards the Hawkdun Range.
