= Clara Evelyn Hallam =

Property owner, boarding–house keeper

Clara Evelyn Hallam (4 March 1885–26 March 1976) was a New Zealand property owner and boarding–house keeper. She was born in Ettrick, Central Otago, New Zealand on 4 March 1885.
