= Omakau =

- Rural settlement
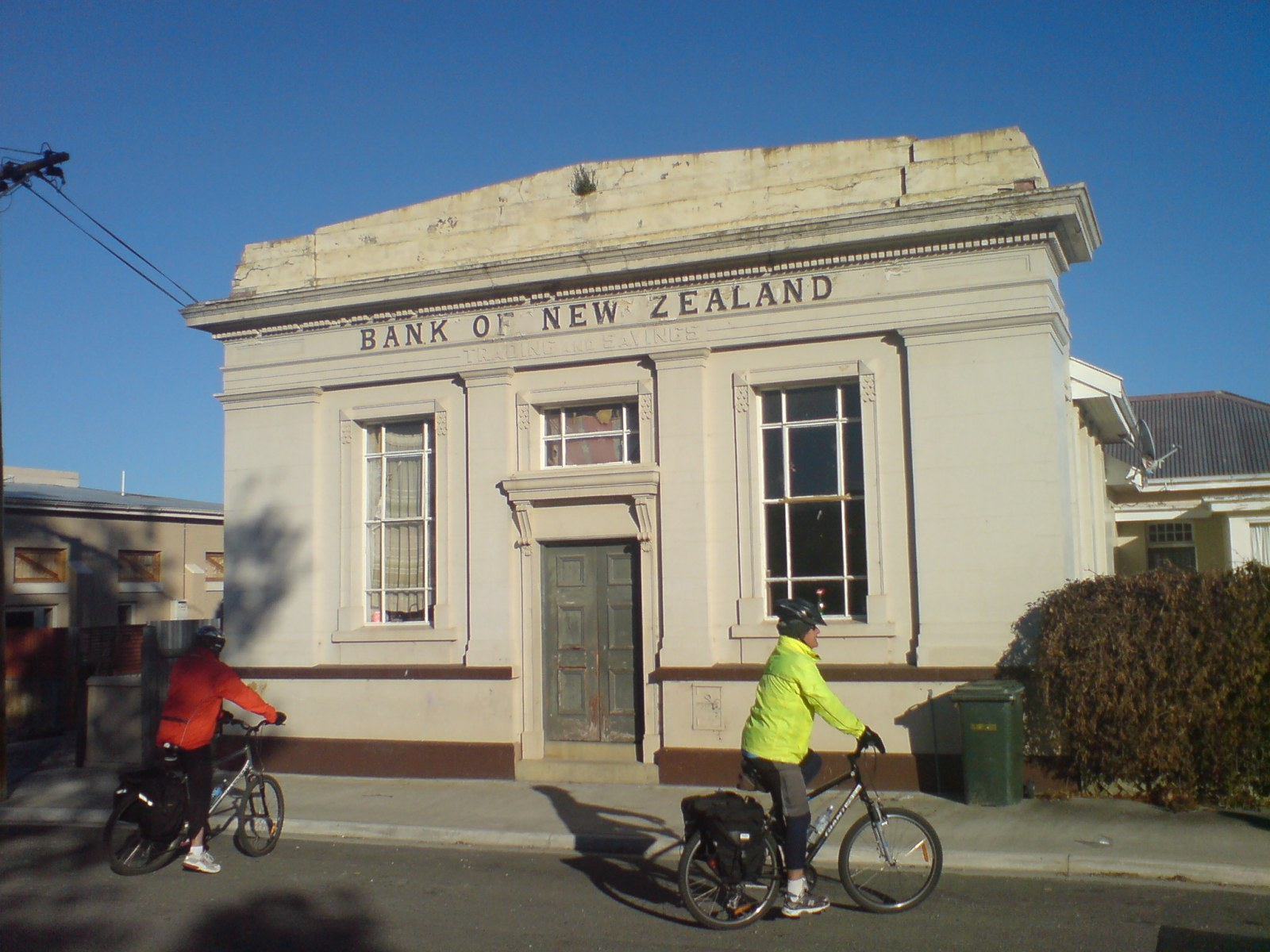
- Former Bank of New Zealand building
- Interactive map of Omakau
- Coordinates: 45°07′S 169°36′E
- Country: New Zealand
- Region: Otago
- Territorial authority: Central Otago District
- Ward: Vincent Ward
- Community: Vincent Community
- Electorates: Waitaki; Te Tai Tonga (Māori)

Government
  - Territorial authority: Central Otago District Council
  - Regional council: Otago Regional Council
  - Mayor of Central Otago: Tamah Alley
  - Waitaki MP: Miles Anderson
  - Te Tai Tonga MP: Tākuta Ferris

Area
  - Total: 21.47 km^{2} (8.29 sq mi)

Population (June 2025)
  - Total: 410
  - Density: 19/km^{2} (49/sq mi)
- Time zone: UTC+12 (NZST)
  - Summer (DST): UTC+13 (NZDT)
- Local iwi: Ngāi Tahu

Omakau (sometimes spelled Ōmakau) is a settlement in Central Otago, New Zealand, located between Alexandra and Ranfurly on the northwest bank of the Manuherikia River. The smaller settlement of Ophir is located on the opposite bank, three kilometres to the southeast.

Ōmakau is the Māori name for a nearby hill, Blackstone Hill and it is also the Māori name for Idaburn. Omakau has since been applied to the wider region and the settlement. The New Zealand Ministry for Culture and Heritage gives a translation of "belonging to husband and wife" for Ōmakau.

Omakau grew when the Otago Central Railway was opened in 1904. Today Omakau has a population of about 250, and is a stopover on both State Highway 85 and the Otago Rail Trail.

Omakau is the site of many historic buildings, including the local hotel built in 1898 and the Catholic Church. Omakau also hosts the Central Otago A&P Show at the local domain, which attracts people from all over the country in February.

== Demographics ==
Omakau is described as a rural settlement by Statistics New Zealand. The urban area of Omakau (between Alton and Harvey streets) covers 0.38 km^{2} (0.15 sq mi) and had a population of 141 in the 2018 New Zealand census. The Statistics New Zealand description relates to a larger area including Ophir which covers 21.47 km^{2} (8.29 sq mi). This larger area had an estimated population of 410 as of June 2025, with a population density of 19 people per km^{2}. It is part of the much larger Manuherikia-Ida Valleys statistical area.

Historical population for Omakau and surrounds
Year	Pop.	±% p.a.
2006	297	—
2013	297	+0.00%
2018	336	+2.50%

Omakau and its surrounds had a population of 336 at the 2018 New Zealand census, an increase of 39 people (13.1%) since the 2013 census, and an increase of 39 people (13.1%) since the 2006 census. There were 138 households, comprising 171 males and 165 females, giving a sex ratio of 1.04 males per female, with 57 people (17.0%) aged under 15 years, 33 (9.8%) aged 15 to 29, 147 (43.8%) aged 30 to 64, and 99 (29.5%) aged 65 or older.

Ethnicities were 91.1% European/Pākehā, 8.9% Māori, 0.9% Pasifika, 2.7% Asian, and 0.9% other ethnicities. People may identify with more than one ethnicity.

Although some people chose not to answer the census's question about religious affiliation, 46.4% had no religion, 47.3% were Christian, 0.9% were Hindu and 0.9% had other religions.

Of those at least 15 years old, 30 (10.8%) people had a bachelor's or higher degree, and 72 (25.8%) people had no formal qualifications. 24 people (8.6%) earned over $70,000 compared to 17.2% nationally. The employment status of those at least 15 was that 132 (47.3%) people were employed full-time, 69 (24.7%) were part-time, and 3 (1.1%) were unemployed.

=== Manuherikia-Ida Valleys ===
The Manuherikia-Ida Valleys statistical area includes Omakau and covers 2,511.47 km^{2} (969.68 sq mi). It had an estimated population of 1,360 as of June 2025, with a population density of 0.54 people per km^{2}.

Historical population for Manuherikia-Ida Valleys
Year	Pop.	±% p.a.
2006	960	—
2013	1,020	+0.87%
2018	1,119	+1.87%

Manuherikia-Ida Valleys had a population of 1,119 at the 2018 New Zealand census, an increase of 99 people (9.7%) since the 2013 census, and an increase of 159 people (16.6%) since the 2006 census. There were 441 households, comprising 594 males and 519 females, giving a sex ratio of 1.14 males per female. The median age was 43.9 years (compared with 37.4 years nationally), with 219 people (19.6%) aged under 15 years, 132 (11.8%) aged 15 to 29, 564 (50.4%) aged 30 to 64, and 204 (18.2%) aged 65 or older.

Ethnicities were 93.3% European/Pākehā, 8.0% Māori, 0.5% Pasifika, 1.6% Asian, and 2.1% other ethnicities. People may identify with more than one ethnicity.

The percentage of people born overseas was 10.5, compared with 27.1% nationally.

Although some people chose not to answer the census's question about religious affiliation, 54.7% had no religion, 37.3% were Christian, 0.3% were Hindu, 0.3% were Buddhist and 0.3% had other religions.

Of those at least 15 years old, 162 (18.0%) people had a bachelor's or higher degree, and 171 (19.0%) people had no formal qualifications. The median income was $33,900, compared with $31,800 nationally. 90 people (10.0%) earned over $70,000 compared to 17.2% nationally. The employment status of those at least 15 was that 519 (57.7%) people were employed full-time, 180 (20.0%) were part-time, and 9 (1.0%) were unemployed.

== Education ==
Omakau School is a co-educational state primary school for Year 1 to 8 students, with a roll of 84 as of July 2026. The school opened in 1935, and is the only remaining one of 13 schools which at one point served the Manuherikia Valley area.

== Climate ==
Climate data for Ophir, elevation 305 m (1,001 ft), 1.5km SE of Omakau, (1991–2020 normals, extremes 1924–present)
Month	Jan	Feb	Mar	Apr	May	Jun	Jul	Aug	Sep	Oct	Nov	Dec	Year
Record high °C (°F)	35.2 (95.4)	35.1 (95.2)	31.6 (88.9)	26.8 (80.2)	24.5 (76.1)	20.3 (68.5)	18.0 (64.4)	22.3 (72.1)	25.4 (77.7)	27.7 (81.9)	31.0 (87.8)	34.4 (93.9)	35.2 (95.4)
Mean maximum °C (°F)	30.6 (87.1)	30.1 (86.2)	27.7 (81.9)	23.3 (73.9)	19.8 (67.6)	16.2 (61.2)	15.3 (59.5)	17.4 (63.3)	20.7 (69.3)	23.9 (75.0)	26.4 (79.5)	28.8 (83.8)	31.8 (89.2)
Mean daily maximum °C (°F)	23.6 (74.5)	23.5 (74.3)	21.0 (69.8)	16.8 (62.2)	12.8 (55.0)	8.5 (47.3)	8.1 (46.6)	11.4 (52.5)	14.8 (58.6)	17.1 (62.8)	19.3 (66.7)	21.8 (71.2)	16.6 (61.8)
Daily mean °C (°F)	15.8 (60.4)	15.4 (59.7)	12.9 (55.2)	9.2 (48.6)	6.2 (43.2)	2.8 (37.0)	2.1 (35.8)	4.6 (40.3)	7.5 (45.5)	9.7 (49.5)	11.8 (53.2)	14.4 (57.9)	9.4 (48.9)
Mean daily minimum °C (°F)	8.1 (46.6)	7.4 (45.3)	4.8 (40.6)	1.7 (35.1)	−0.3 (31.5)	−2.9 (26.8)	−3.8 (25.2)	−2.2 (28.0)	0.2 (32.4)	2.2 (36.0)	4.3 (39.7)	7.1 (44.8)	2.2 (36.0)
Mean minimum °C (°F)	0.4 (32.7)	0.4 (32.7)	−2.1 (28.2)	−5.0 (23.0)	−6.9 (19.6)	−8.7 (16.3)	−9.0 (15.8)	−7.6 (18.3)	−5.9 (21.4)	−4.4 (24.1)	−2.7 (27.1)	0.0 (32.0)	−9.8 (14.4)
Record low °C (°F)	−2.6 (27.3)	−2.1 (28.2)	−5.6 (21.9)	−8.0 (17.6)	−14.5 (5.9)	−16.5 (2.3)	−21.6 (−6.9)	−12.8 (9.0)	−10.6 (12.9)	−6.9 (19.6)	−5.7 (21.7)	−4.1 (24.6)	−21.6 (−6.9)
Average rainfall mm (inches)	47.8 (1.88)	42.3 (1.67)	32.7 (1.29)	35.7 (1.41)	37.8 (1.49)	33.7 (1.33)	19.1 (0.75)	17.5 (0.69)	21.1 (0.83)	36.1 (1.42)	41.4 (1.63)	48.5 (1.91)	413.7 (16.3)
Source: NIWA
