= Alexandra, New Zealand =

Town in Otago, New Zealand

Alexandra Manuherikia or Areketanara (Māori)
- Minor urban area
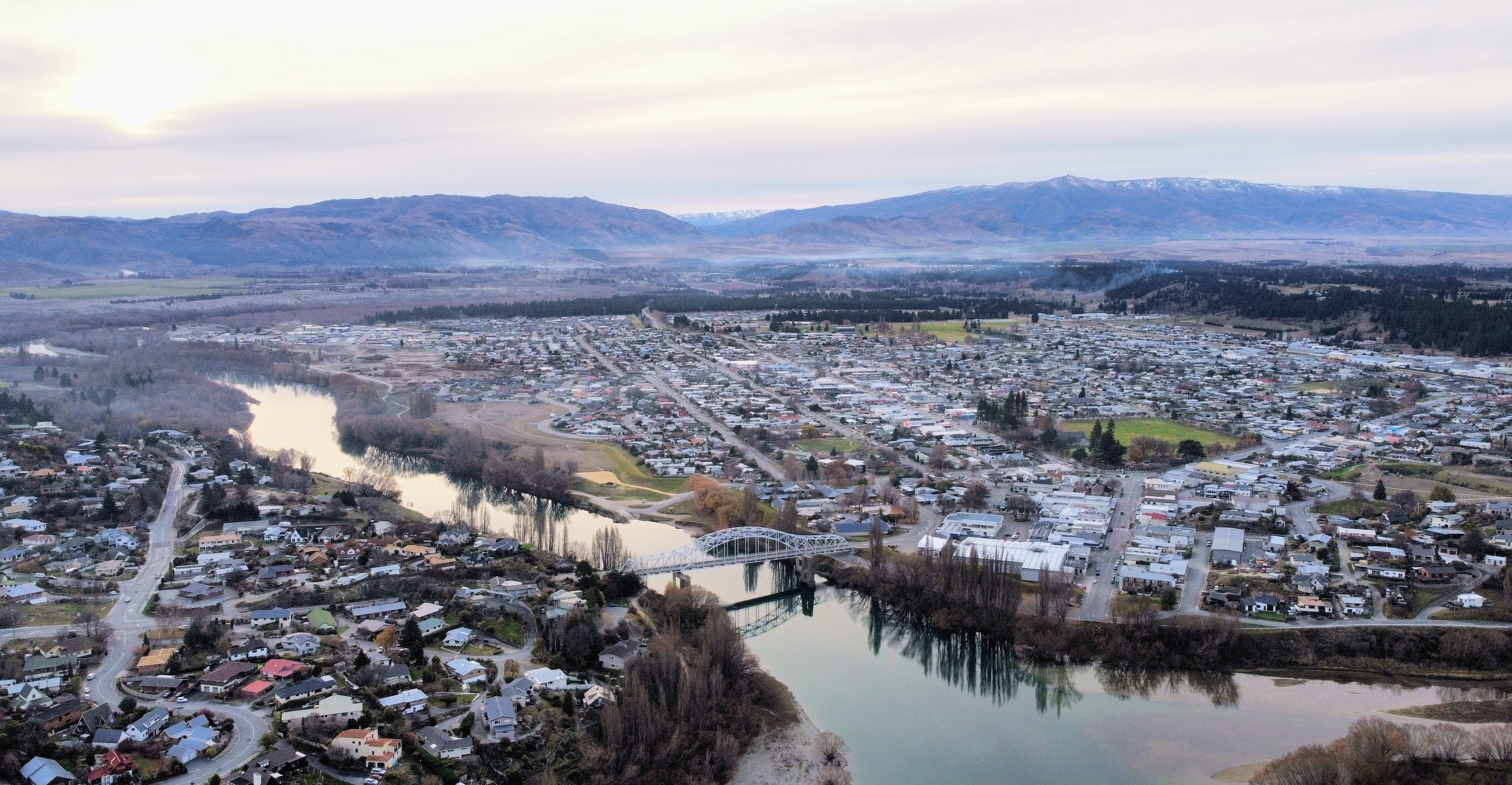
- Skyline of Alexandra in May 2022
- Interactive map of Alexandra
- Coordinates: 45°14′57″S 169°22′47″E
- Country: New Zealand
- Region: Otago
- Territorial authority: Central Otago District
- Ward: Vincent Ward
- Community: Vincent Community
- Electorates: Waitaki; Te Tai Tonga (Māori)

Government
  - Territorial authority: Central Otago District Council
  - Regional council: Otago Regional Council
  - Mayor of Central Otago: Tamah Alley
  - Southland MP: Joseph Mooney
  - Te Tai Tonga MP: Mananui Ramsden

Area
  - Total: 9.76 km^{2} (3.77 sq mi)
- Elevation: 150 m (490 ft)

Population (June 2025)
  - Total: 5,860
  - Density: 600/km^{2} (1,560/sq mi)
- Postcode: 9320
- Local iwi: Ngāi Tahu
- Website: alexandra.co.nz

Alexandra (Māori: Manuherikia or Areketanara) is a town in the Central Otago district of the South Island of New Zealand. It is on the banks of the Clutha River (at the confluence of the Manuherikia River), on State Highway 8, 188 kilometres (117 mi) by road from Dunedin and 33 kilometres (21 mi) south of Cromwell. The nearest towns to Alexandra via state highway 8 are Clyde seven kilometres to the northwest and Roxburgh forty kilometres to the south. State highway 85 also connects Alexandra to Omakau, Lauder, Oturehua, Ranfurly and on to Palmerston on the East Otago coast.

The town of Alexandra is home to 5,860 people as of June 2025.

== History ==
The town was founded during the Otago gold rush in the 1860s, and was named after Alexandra of Denmark by John Aitken Connell who surveyed the town. In a two-month period in 1862, two gold miners called Horatio Hartley and Christopher Reilly collected 34 kilograms of gold from the Cromwell Gorge, Hartley and Reilly travelled together to New Zealand after meeting in the Californian gold rush. They initially worked in secret to obtain as much gold as they could along the Cromwell gorge. In order to obtain the government's reward on offer for gold discoveries, they made the site public.

This made the Clutha River and its tributaries famous for their gold. In a short time, 2000 miners had descended on Alexandra. Conditions were uninviting initially with a lack of food, equipment and wood. Many of the early miners were Chinese of Cantonese origin, with some suggesting Chinese made up as much as 50% of the mining population. During the goldrush days, a gold dredge named the Lady Molyneux captured 1234 ounces of gold in just one week. Goldmining the Clutha was a dangerous occupation. In 1863, there were 37 men who drowned in the Clutha river or its tributaries. Of these, 12 could not be named. In the 1870s, Chinese miners moved in to re-work claims that others had sold on. By 1889, most of the easy to access gold had been mined and leases were sold for virtually nothing. At this stage, stone fruit orchards gradually took over the local economy.

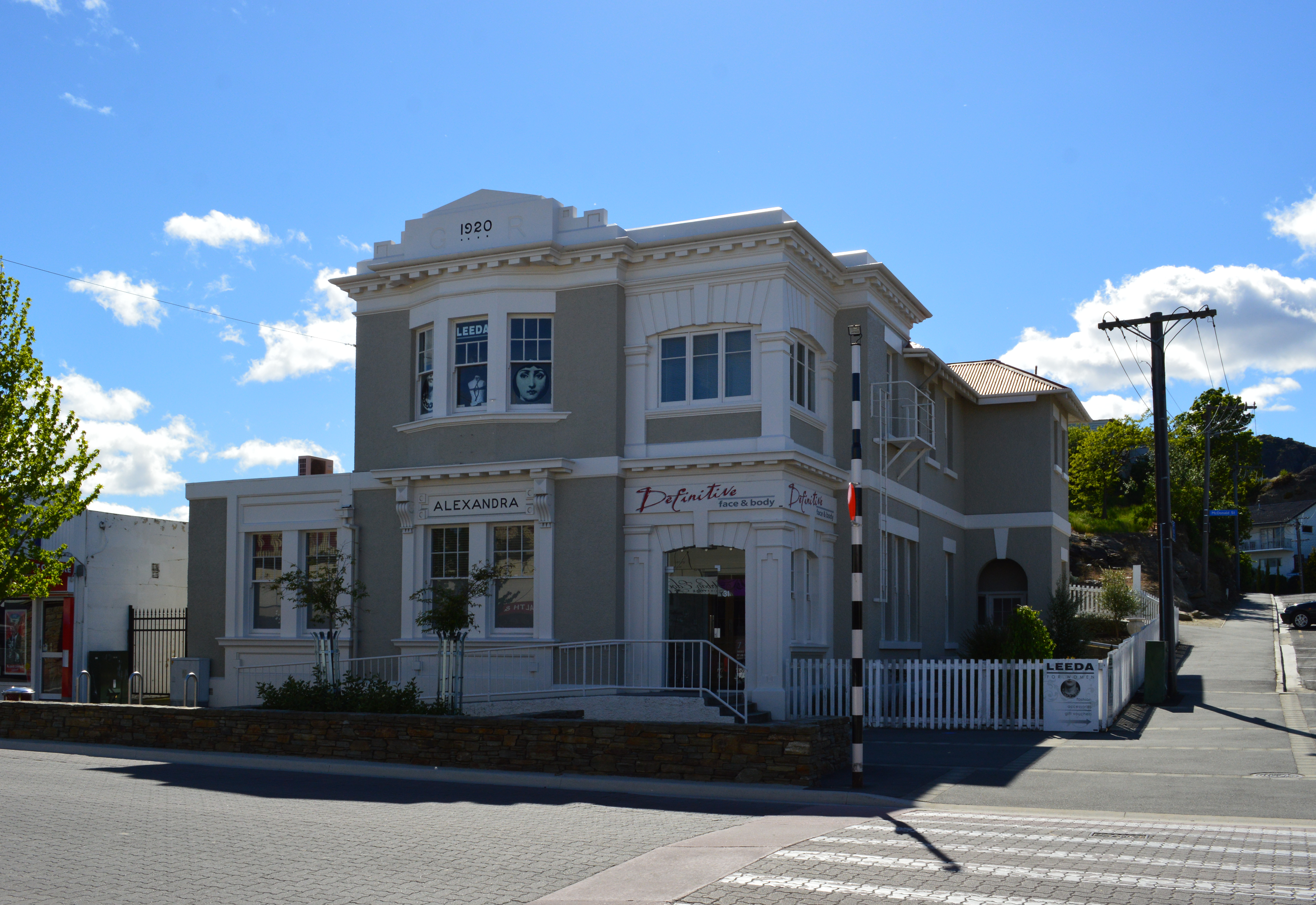
The old Post Office, Alexandra

When the river had run out of gold, the river banks were dredged. This was termed ‘paddock dredging’. This continued day and night between 1896 and 1924 and again between 1951 and 1963. The noise was ever present and loud and it also produced significant quantities of dust which plagued Alexandra. If the dredging hit hard rock, it interrupted the power supply to Alexandra and the lights of the entire town dimmed. The tailings from all the dredging now cover 170 hectares in a historic reserve known as the Earnscleugh Dredge Tailings.

In 1878, the Clutha river flooded many towns including Clyde and Alexandra. The Manuherikia valley "resembled an inland sea". As a result of this event, the Alexandra suspension bridge was constructed between 1879 and 1882 after the bridge at Clyde failed in the 1878 flood. The Otago Central Railway line from Dunedin into Central Otago reached Alexandra in December 1906.

Originally referred to as "Alexandra South" to distinguish it from a North Island town with the same name, the word "South" was dropped in 1867 after the North Island town was renamed to Pirongia. It was known to miners of the day by several names: the "Lower Township", the "Junction Township", and "Manuherikia". (The "Upper Township" was Dunstan, now Clyde.)

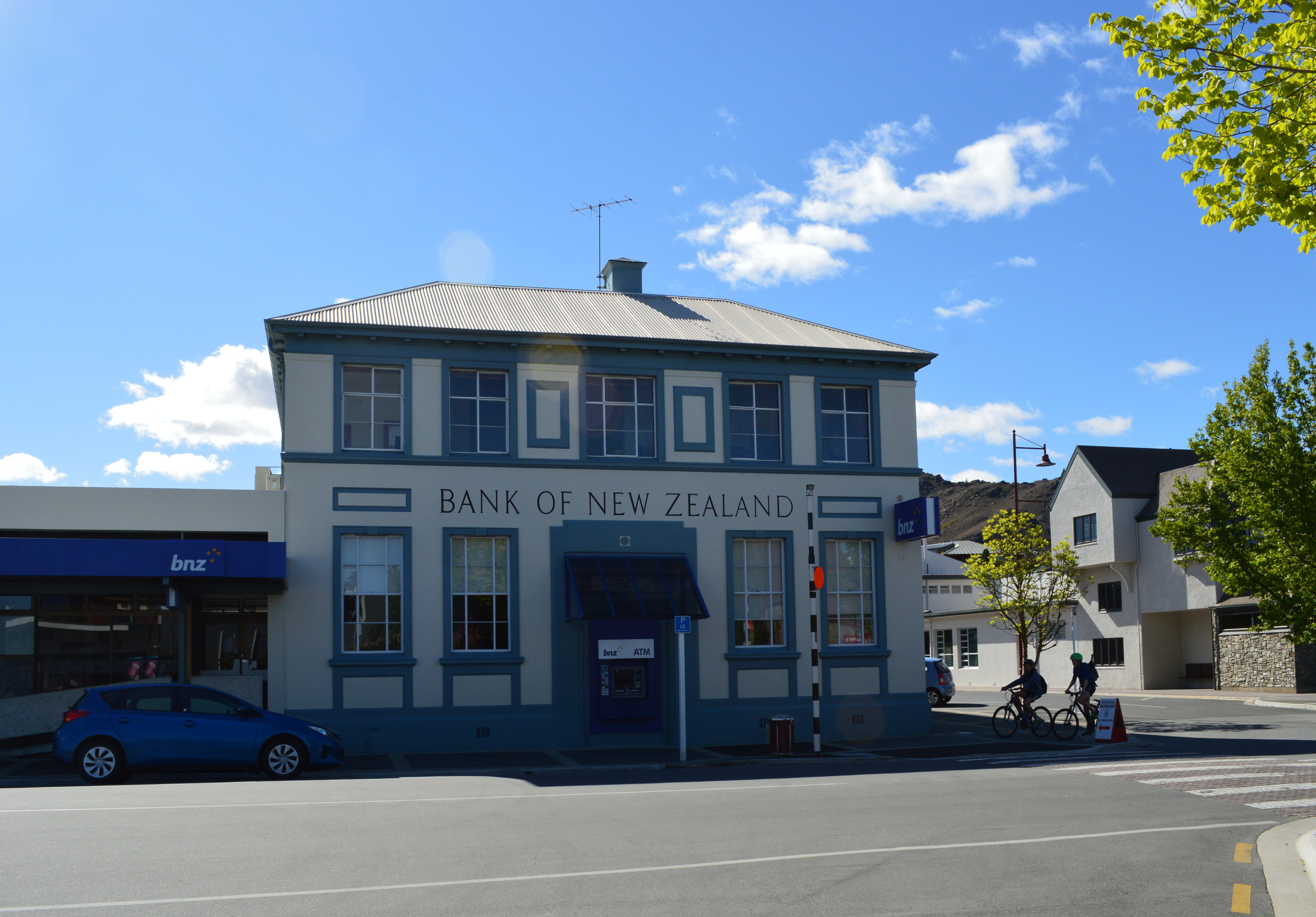
Alexandra Bank of New Zealand

Many orchards were destroyed in the 1980s as a result of construction, 10 km upstream, of the Clyde High Dam, which is the country's third largest hydroelectric power station. The railway line was closed after the completion of the Clyde Dam in 1990 and the lines were removed in 1990. In 2000, the Otago Central Rail Trail was opened allowing mountain bikers and walkers to traverse the rail corridor from Clyde through Alexandra and on to Middlemarch.

== Geography ==
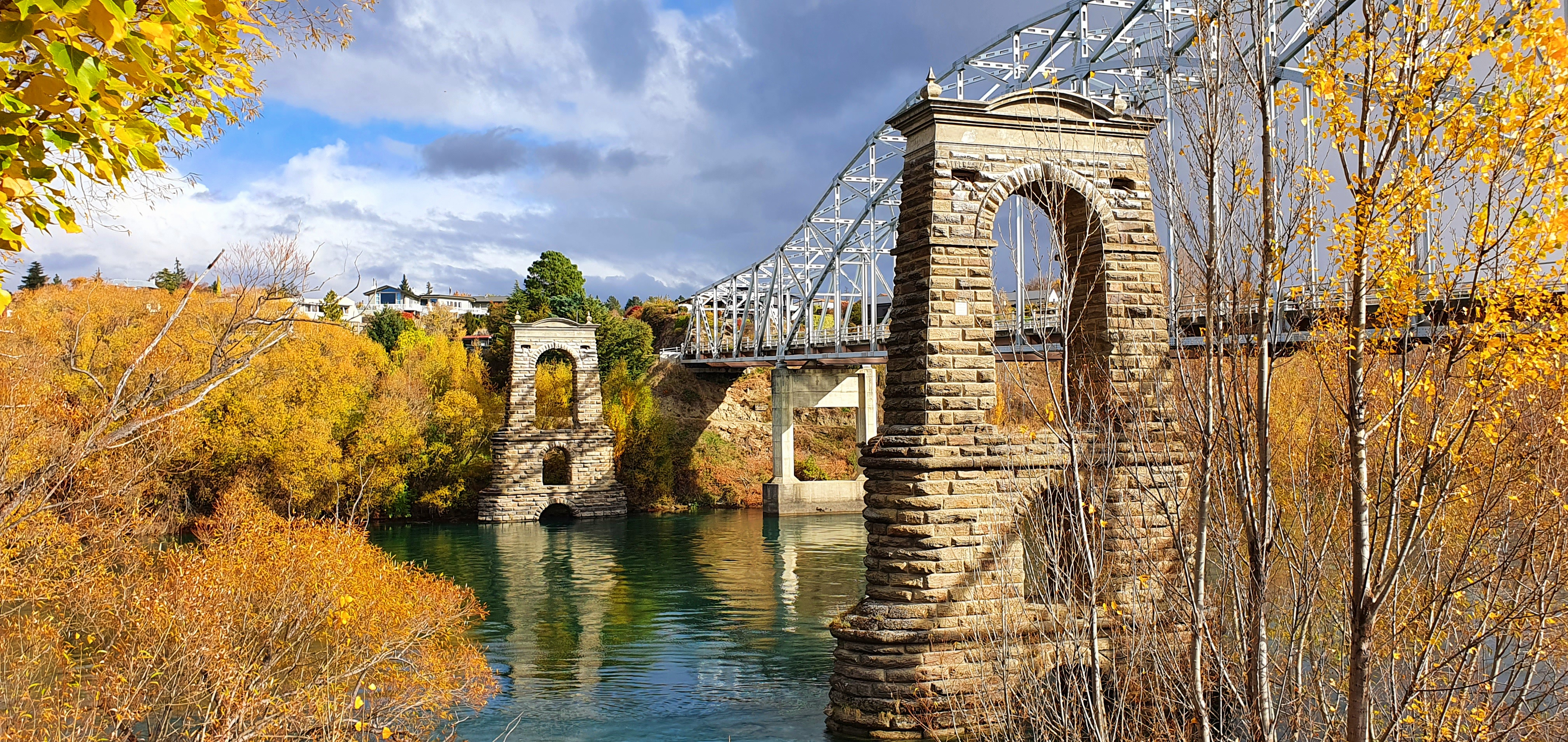
The Alexandra Bridge Towers in autumn, remnants of the old bridge next to the 1958 arch bridge.

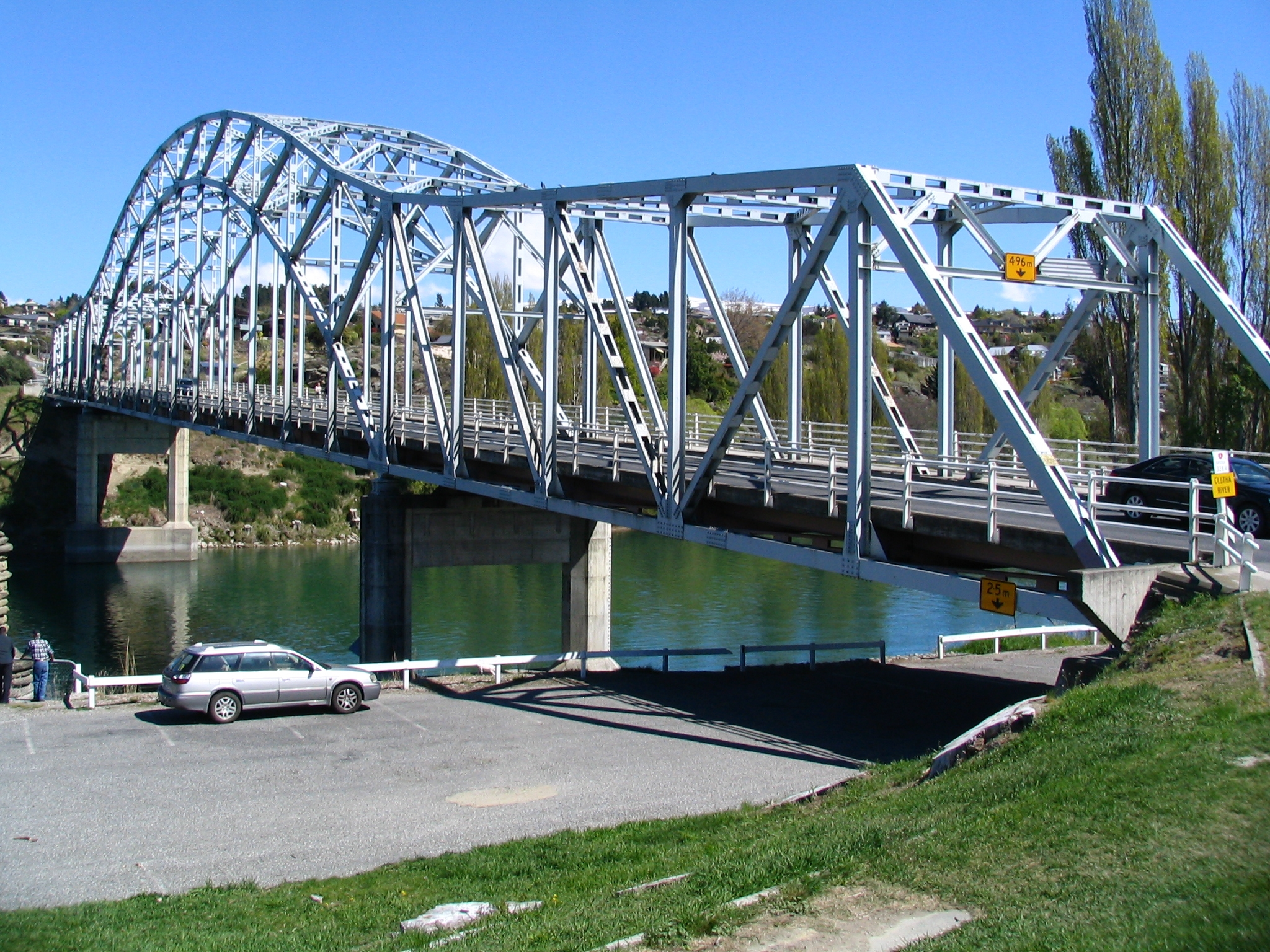
The 1958 steel truss arch bridge carrying State Highway 8 across the Clutha River at Alexandra

The town is a popular holiday destination mainly due to the hot and sunny climate during summer. There are many accommodation options in Alexandra.

Alexandra has had two bridges crossing the Clutha River, the current one opening in 1958.

=== Climate ===
Alexandra experiences an oceanic climate bordering on a semi-arid climate (Köppen climate classification Cfb/BSk).

Alexandra is one of the farthest towns from a coastline and experiences warm summers and cold winters compared to the rest of New Zealand, with summer temperatures that can reach the mid 30's °C (mid 90's °F) and winter lows that drop to around −8.0 °C (18 °F) most years. Every year an average of 66 days will exceed 25.0 °C (77 °F) and 92 nights will drop below 0.0 °C (32 °F). The hottest and coldest temperatures recorded in Alexandra (between 1971 and 2019) are 38.7 °C (102 °F) (recorded on 5 February 2005 and 30 January 2018) and −11.2 °C (12 °F) respectively.

During times of high pressure, temperature inversions can form, keeping temperatures in Alexandra below freezing all day.

Alexandra is one of the driest places in the country, often recording fewer than 400 mm (16 in) of rain each year, the majority of which falls in the summer half of the year. The town held the New Zealand record for the lowest rainfall in one calendar year, recording just 212 mm (8.3 in) in 1964.

Climate data for Alexandra (1991–2020 normals, extremes 1929–present)
Month	Jan	Feb	Mar	Apr	May	Jun	Jul	Aug	Sep	Oct	Nov	Dec	Year
Record high °C (°F)	38.7 (101.7)	38.7 (101.7)	33.6 (92.5)	28.5 (83.3)	25.7 (78.3)	21.3 (70.3)	20.1 (68.2)	22.2 (72.0)	29.0 (84.2)	30.0 (86.0)	32.6 (90.7)	36.0 (96.8)	38.7 (101.7)
Mean maximum °C (°F)	33.1 (91.6)	32.7 (90.9)	29.7 (85.5)	25.2 (77.4)	20.8 (69.4)	17.8 (64.0)	17.0 (62.6)	19.2 (66.6)	23.3 (73.9)	26.9 (80.4)	29.1 (84.4)	31.8 (89.2)	34.7 (94.5)
Mean daily maximum °C (°F)	25.3 (77.5)	25.2 (77.4)	22.5 (72.5)	18.1 (64.6)	13.5 (56.3)	9.0 (48.2)	8.8 (47.8)	12.7 (54.9)	16.5 (61.7)	19.2 (66.6)	21.3 (70.3)	23.8 (74.8)	18.0 (64.4)
Daily mean °C (°F)	18.1 (64.6)	17.7 (63.9)	15.0 (59.0)	11.0 (51.8)	7.5 (45.5)	3.8 (38.8)	3.2 (37.8)	6.1 (43.0)	9.3 (48.7)	11.9 (53.4)	14.1 (57.4)	16.7 (62.1)	11.2 (52.2)
Mean daily minimum °C (°F)	10.8 (51.4)	10.2 (50.4)	7.5 (45.5)	3.9 (39.0)	1.4 (34.5)	−1.4 (29.5)	−2.3 (27.9)	−0.6 (30.9)	2.2 (36.0)	4.6 (40.3)	6.9 (44.4)	9.5 (49.1)	4.4 (39.9)
Mean minimum °C (°F)	3.7 (38.7)	3.3 (37.9)	0.6 (33.1)	−2.7 (27.1)	−4.8 (23.4)	−6.7 (19.9)	−7.6 (18.3)	−6.3 (20.7)	−4.0 (24.8)	−2.4 (27.7)	0.1 (32.2)	2.8 (37.0)	−8.0 (17.6)
Record low °C (°F)	−0.6 (30.9)	−1.9 (28.6)	−3.2 (26.2)	−6.3 (20.7)	−11.5 (11.3)	−11.8 (10.8)	−11.7 (10.9)	−10.1 (13.8)	−7.5 (18.5)	−5.0 (23.0)	−4.7 (23.5)	−2.8 (27.0)	−11.8 (10.8)
Average rainfall mm (inches)	46.9 (1.85)	41.1 (1.62)	31.2 (1.23)	22.0 (0.87)	34.3 (1.35)	30.9 (1.22)	25.2 (0.99)	15.4 (0.61)	21.3 (0.84)	29.6 (1.17)	32.7 (1.29)	34.5 (1.36)	365.1 (14.4)
Average rainy days (≥ 1.0 mm)	5.9	5.2	5.2	4.9	6.8	5.4	4.9	4.2	5.0	6.2	5.5	7.0	66.2
Average relative humidity (%)	68.3	76.1	81.0	84.4	87.7	90.0	89.7	85.0	73.2	71.5	66.6	66.8	78.4
Mean monthly sunshine hours	253.1	216.6	181.2	142.1	104.3	84.0	87.0	135.6	169.6	219.2	236.4	236.4	2,065.5
Source: NIWA Climate Data

== Demography ==
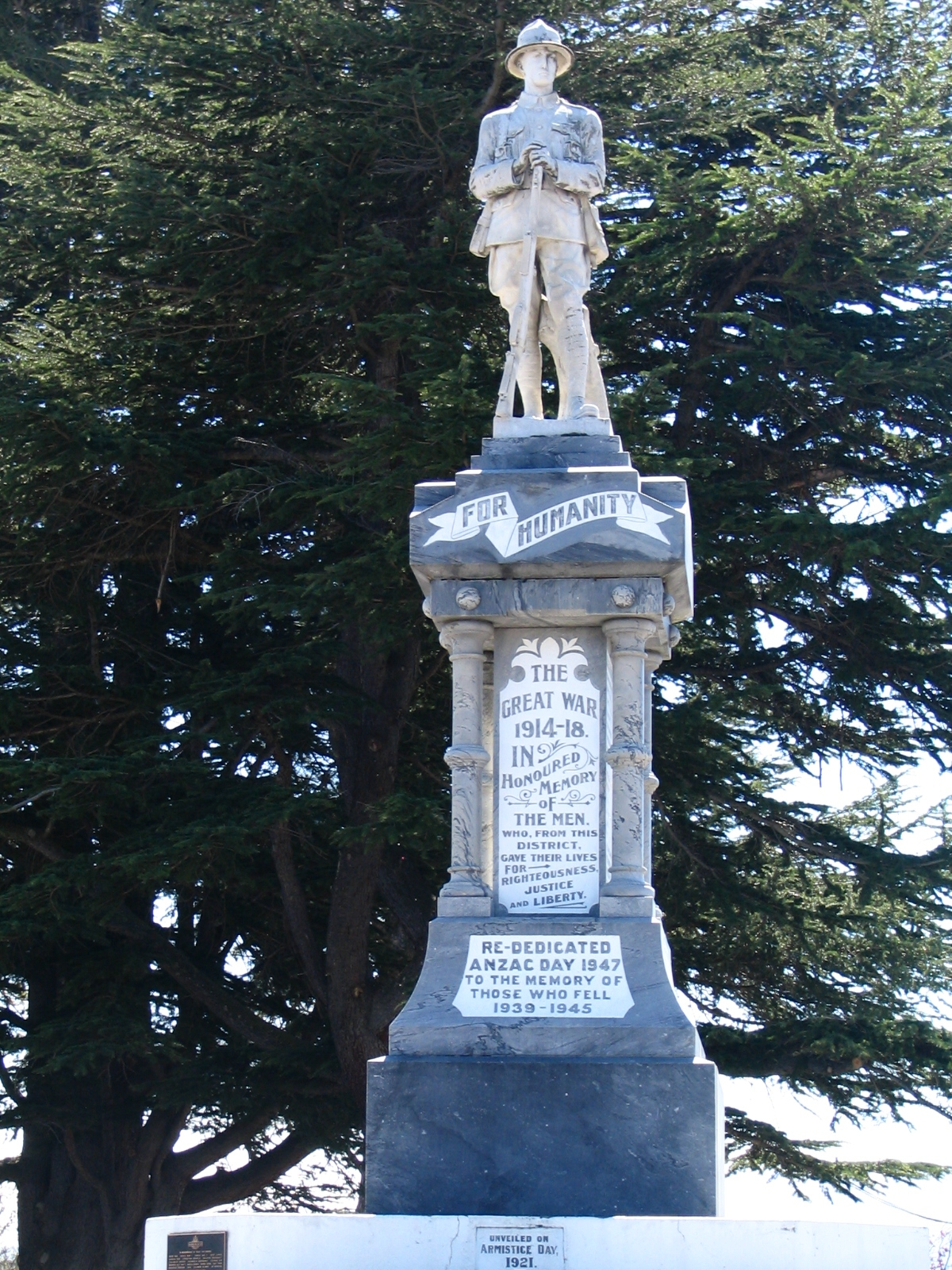
War Memorial on Tarbert Street in Alexandra, New Zealand

Alexandra's population was 1414 residents in 1951 and this had increased to 1823 residents in 1956 and then to 2292 residents in 1961.

Alexandra is described by Statistics New Zealand as a small urban area, and covers 9.76 km^{2} (3.77 sq mi). It had an estimated population of 5,860 as of June 2025, with a population density of 600 people per km^{2}. It is the seventh-largest urban area in Otago, and the second-largest urban area in the Central Otago District behind Cromwell.

Historical population
Year	Pop.	±% p.a.
2006	4,827	—
2013	4,803	−0.07%
2018	5,472	+2.64%

Alexandra had a population of 5,472 at the 2018 New Zealand census, an increase of 669 people (13.9%) since the 2013 census, and an increase of 645 people (13.4%) since the 2006 census. There were 2,331 households, comprising 2,661 males and 2,811 females, giving a sex ratio of 0.95 males per female, with 909 people (16.6%) aged under 15 years, 729 (13.3%) aged 15 to 29, 2,247 (41.1%) aged 30 to 64, and 1,590 (29.1%) aged 65 or older.

Ethnicities were 93.1% European/Pākehā, 9.8% Māori, 1.5% Pasifika, 2.5% Asian, and 1.4% other ethnicities. People may identify with more than one ethnicity.

The percentage of people born overseas was 12.3, compared with 27.1% nationally.

Although some people chose not to answer the census's question about religious affiliation, 51.8% had no religion, 38.4% were Christian, 0.5% had Māori religious beliefs, 0.4% were Hindu, 0.2% were Muslim, 0.2% were Buddhist and 1.2% had other religions.

Of those at least 15 years old, 624 (13.7%) people had a bachelor's or higher degree, and 1,083 (23.7%) people had no formal qualifications. 573 people (12.6%) earned over $70,000 compared to 17.2% nationally. The employment status of those at least 15 was that 2,076 (45.5%) people were employed full-time, 810 (17.8%) were part-time, and 81 (1.8%) were unemployed.

Individual statistical areas
Name	Area (km^{2})	Population	Density (per km^{2})	Households	Median age	Median income
Alexandra North	4.60	2,856	621	1,173	45.8 years	$29,500
Alexandra South	5.16	2,616	507	1,158	52.7 years	$30,500
New Zealand					37.4 years	$31,800

== Economy ==
=== Viticulture ===
Grape production is another major industry in the Central Otago Wine Region. The first plantings of grapes were in 1864. Pinot Noir and Pinot Gris are some of the varieties that are grown in the vicinity. Alexandra has a number of vineyards that potentially are the world's most southern. There are more than 25 vineyards in the vicinity of Alexandra. These include Three Miners Vineyard, Grasshopper Rock, Como Villa Estate, Rock'n'Pillar, Thyme Hill Vineyard, Leaning Rock Vineyard, Judge Rock, Immigrants Vineyard, Dunstan Road Wines, Alexandra Wine Company, Drumsara Wines, McArthur Ridge Vineyard and Perseverance Estate. A cycling trail called Pedal for Pinot gives visitors the opportunity to cycle around the cellar doors and sample a variety of local wines.

=== Horticulture ===
Alexandra is the service centre for a significant stone-fruit industry, which is celebrated by a blossom festival in the town each spring. The first orchards planted provided fruit for the mining community. Now, nectarines, apricots, cherries, peaches, plums and apples are grown and sold for both New Zealand and export markets. Seasonal work picking fruit is available during the summer and many tourists and Pacific Islanders come to New Zealand to work in Alexandra.

=== Pastoral farming ===
Sheep farming, particularly of merino sheep has occurred around Alexandra for many years. One of the original sheep runs was Galloway Station. This was established by Watson and Alexander Shennan in 1858.The brothers, from Scotland imported various breeds of sheep. In particular they acquired 15 merino rams and 27 merino ewes in 1861 from the King of Prussia's Potsdam Stud, which cost the massive sum at that time of £2000. The Galloway Station was sub-divided in 1916.

=== Airport ===
The Alexandra Aerodrome is Alexandra's only airport. SPANZ, NAC and Mount Cook Airlines were main users of the airport till the 1980s. It is home to the Central Otago Flying Club, and gliding. Commercial passenger flights are no longer scheduled; Queenstown International Airport is the nearest facility for those.

== Education ==
=== Primary schools ===
The Terrace School is a co-educational state primary school for Year 1 to 8 students, with a roll of 283 as of July 2026. It opened in 1965.

Alexandra School is a co-educational state primary school for Year 1 to 8 students, with a roll of 202. It opened in 1865, and became a district high school in 1912. After the opening of Dunstan High and The Terrace School, Alexandra School resumed its function solely as a primary school.

St Gerard's School is a co-educational state-integrated Catholic primary school for Year 1 to 8 students, with a roll of 166. The school first opened in 1912.

=== Secondary schools ===
Dunstan High School is a co-educational state secondary school for Year 9 to 13 students, with a roll of 590 as of July 2026. It opened in 1962.

== Events ==
=== Blossom festival ===
Alexandra is perhaps best known for the Alexandra Blossom Festival, an annual event that began in 1957. The Festival celebrates the advent of Spring in the Central Otago District as evidenced by the blooming of the fruit trees.

=== Great Easter bunny hunt ===
Sixty rabbits were introduced by the Acclimatisation Society of Otago in 1866 and it only took five years for them to get established and to start eating the pasture land bare. They are prolific and a pest species around Alexandra. Each year at Easter, locals compete to shoot as many rabbits as possible to cull numbers. The event is run by the Alexandra Lions Club and it is also a great social occasion for the town. It has been run annually since the early 1990s. The event was cancelled in 2018 to allow the Otago Regional Council's programme to introduce the rabbit virus RHDV1 K5.Unfortunately the virus did not have the desired impact on rabbit numbers that was expected and there are more rabbits around than ever. Due to the dry conditions in 2019, the fire risk was deemed to be extreme and the event was cancelled.In 2020 it was again cancelled due to the coronavirus pandemic. The bunny hunt took place in 2021 with over 10,000 rabbits shot. It was thought not to have a significant impact on the overall rabbit population around Alexandra.

== Amenities ==
=== Alexandra swimming pool ===
The Alexandra swimming pool complex is run by the Central Otago District Council. It was built in 2003 and replaced the previous swimming pool known as the Centennial Baths. The indoor complex includes a 25m lap pool, a learners' pool and a spa pool. An outdoor pool is also open during the summer months. The complex is located within Molyneux Park.

=== Ice skating rink ===
An outdoor Olympic sized ice rink in Molyneux Park is run by the Alexandra Winter Sports Club. It is the largest one of its type in New Zealand. It was opened in 1993. It replaced the previous ice skating rink at the Manorburn Dam.

=== Alexandra golf club ===
The Alexandra golf club was established in 1901. It moved to its present site alongside the Alexandra/Clyde highway in the mid-1960s and work started on the club house in 1970. Work occurred in 1974 redeveloping the layout of the 18 hole course. The course is relatively flat with well irrigated tree lined fairways. Rabbits were noted to be a problem at the golf course in 2019 and the golf club was in the process of exploring fencing options to keep the rabbits out.

=== Molyneux park ===
Molyneux Park is located on state highway 8. It is home to the swimming pool complex, netball courts, a first class cricket venue, the ice skating rink, the Alexandra bowls club and the Alexandra toy library.

=== Central Stories museum and art gallery ===
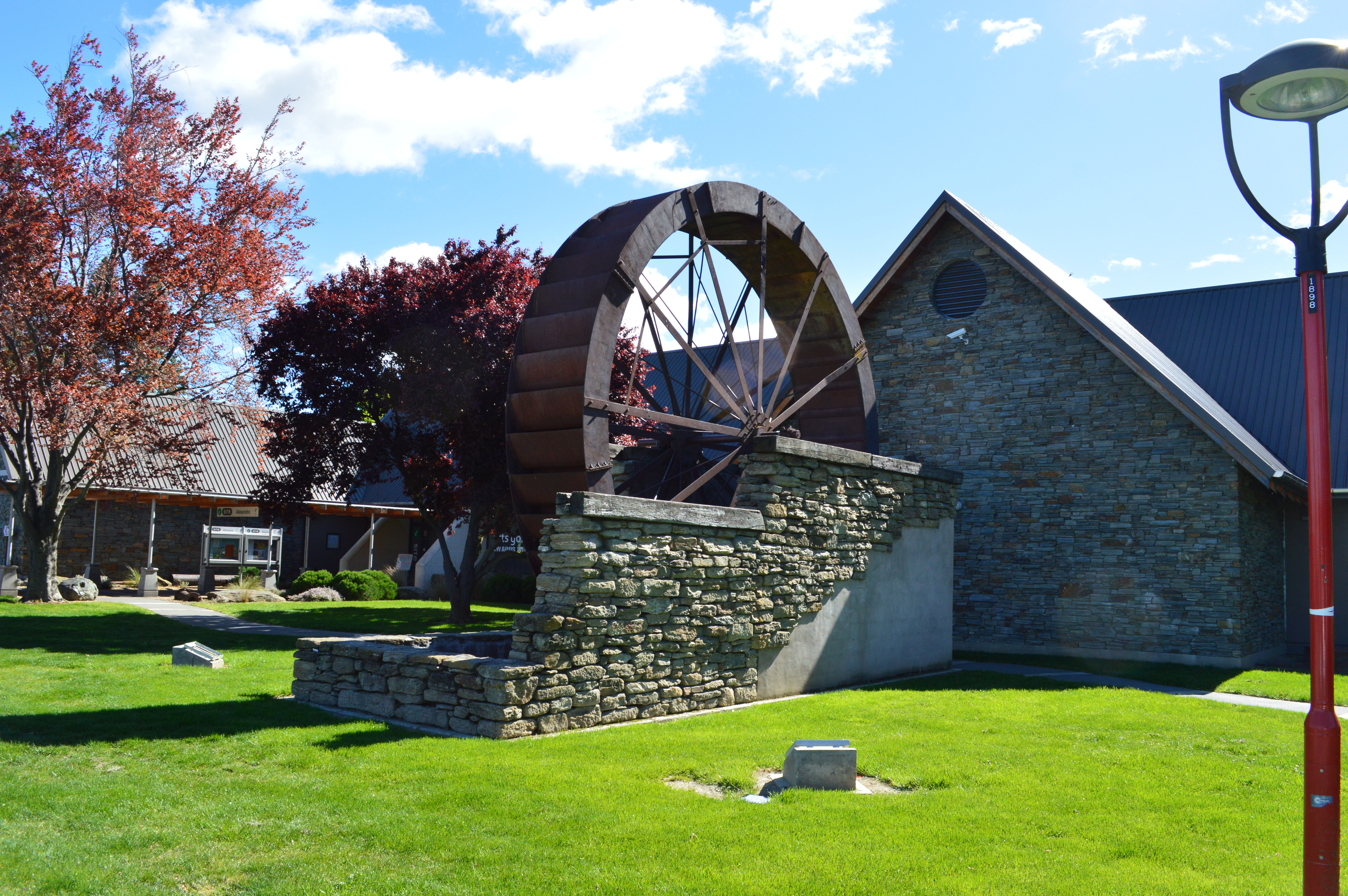
Waterwheel at the Central Otago Art Gallery and Museum

The Alexandra Museum and Art Gallery is known as Central Stories. The museum focusses on local history, in particular, geology; early explorers; social history; gold mining; Chinese immigration during the gold mining years; stone fruit orchards, farming and viticulture. It is located at 21 Centennial Avenue and is open Monday to Friday between 10am to 4pm and 11am to 2pm on weekends and public holidays.

=== Alexandra public library ===
The Alexandra Public Library is located at 42 Tarbet Street. It is open Monday to Friday and on Saturday mornings. It has a wide selection of adult and children's books, magazines, local newspapers and DVDs. It has free Wifi and a programme of regular events.

=== Pioneer park ===
Pioneer Park was established in the late 1860s. There is a playground and botanic gardens located within it. There are also three artificial grass tennis courts located within the park.

=== Lower Manorburn dam ===
Located in the hills just outside of Alexandra, this large irrigation dam was built in the 1900s. It is a well known body of water for fishing, canoeing and swimming. In winter ice skating is popular when the dam freezes over.

=== Mountain biking ===
A portion of the Otago Central Rail Trail runs through Alexandra. The "Mountain bikers of Alexandra" club are active in building trails in the local area. There are a number of mountain bike trails at Alexandra Airport, Boot Hill, Clyde Lookout and Flat Top Hill. The award-winning trails at Flat Top Hill have been built in partnership with the Department of Conservation.

== Alexandra clock ==
A large clock was built on Knobbies Range overlooking Alexandra in 1968. Initially, there was some opposition to the proposal. A full size mock-up was placed on the proposed site for six weeks. Local reaction was assessed and it was overwhelmingly supportive of the idea. It cost around $3000 to build the clock. This included the foundations, steel markers, electrics, painting etc. The Jaycees club put in many hours of volunteer labour to the project. The clock has a diameter of 11 metres. The minute hand is 5.6m in length including the counterweight and the hour hand is 4m in length including the counterweight. It is lit up at night by 150 light bulbs (upgraded to LEDs in 2006 from the original torch bulbs). The LED lights have subsequently been upgraded to colour LEDs in 2018. At Easter an illuminated cross is placed on the hillside nearby. In April 2020, damage caused the clock to stop working. It appeared that "someone swung on the hands’’ of the clock causing the clock to stop at 8:34.

== Air pollution ==
Alexandra suffers from air pollution, typically in winter. The main cause of air pollution in Alexandra is from domestic heating appliances that burn solid fuels (e.g. wood and coal). Air pollution peaks during winter mornings and evenings. The results from a study show that sub-freezing temperatures and still wind conditions at 8 am or 9 am can be used to predict high levels of PM10 that evening. Alexandra is one of the least windy towns in New Zealand. This, combined with its geography, being an inland basin, means that the smoke generated from domestic heating appliances stays sitting within the town environs. Daily PM10 concentrations regularly exceed the national guidelines from the month of May through to the month of August each year. Between 2005 and 2017 winter concentrations of PM10s have decreased about 30%. Despite this, Alexandra has "some of the worst winter air quality in the country".

Pupils at Alexandra primary school were helping scientists at NIWA learn more about pollution in their town in a four-month project that will track where smoke comes from and where it goes over winter in 2018.

Alexandra had three high pollution nights, where PM10 particulate levels exceeded the national environmental standards, in winter 2021. This increased in winter 2022 to a total of four nights.

== Notable buildings ==
=== Shaky bridge ===
The Shaky bridge crosses the Manuherikia river and links Kerry Street and Graveyard Gully Road. It was completed in 1879. Leslie Duncan MacGeorge (1854–1939) designed the 60 metre long bridge. It was the only bridge crossing the Manuherikia river for twenty years. In 1906 a road and rail bridge was completed making the shaky bridge obsolete. It did not receive the required upkeep and earned its nickname of the "shaky bridge". The small suspension bridge with its stone towers was saved by the Pioneer Bridge Committee. The Committee raised funds to restore the bridge. Today it is promoted as a tourist attraction and is only open to pedestrians.

=== Simmond's boarding house ===
Simmond's boarding house was built in 1882 and provided accommodation for over ninety years until it was converted into an office building in the 1970s. It was built by James Simmonds who also served as mayor of Alexandra.

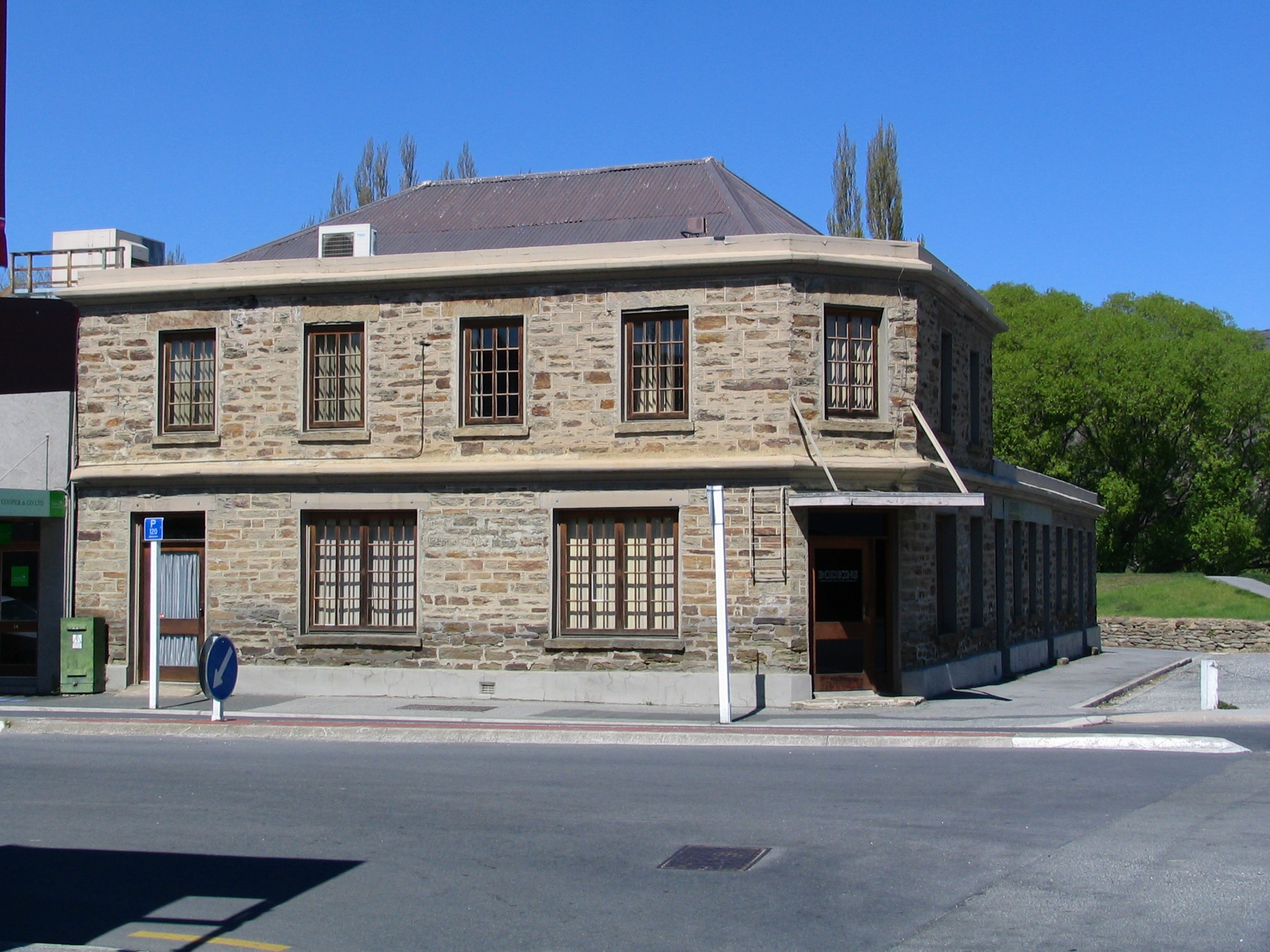
Simmond's Boarding House Alexandra, New Zealand

=== Bendigo hotel ===
The Bendigo Hotel was situated on the corner of Tabert & Rivers streets. The original Bendigo Hotel, was a wooden, single storied structure built in the 1860s. This original building was demolished in 1900. This was required by the Tuapeka Licensing Commission who stated that the building should be replaced, or the license revoked. The Bendigo Hotel was then rebuilt in 1900. The new hotel was a two storied brick structure. It contained 30 bedrooms and was of the standard of a first class city hotel at the time. Numerous alternations occurred to the building over the next 100 years. The Bendigo was flooded in December 1995 and again in November 1999. This led to the hotel being demolished and the construction of a floodbank in 2001 to protect Alexandra from flooding.

=== Alexandra courthouse ===
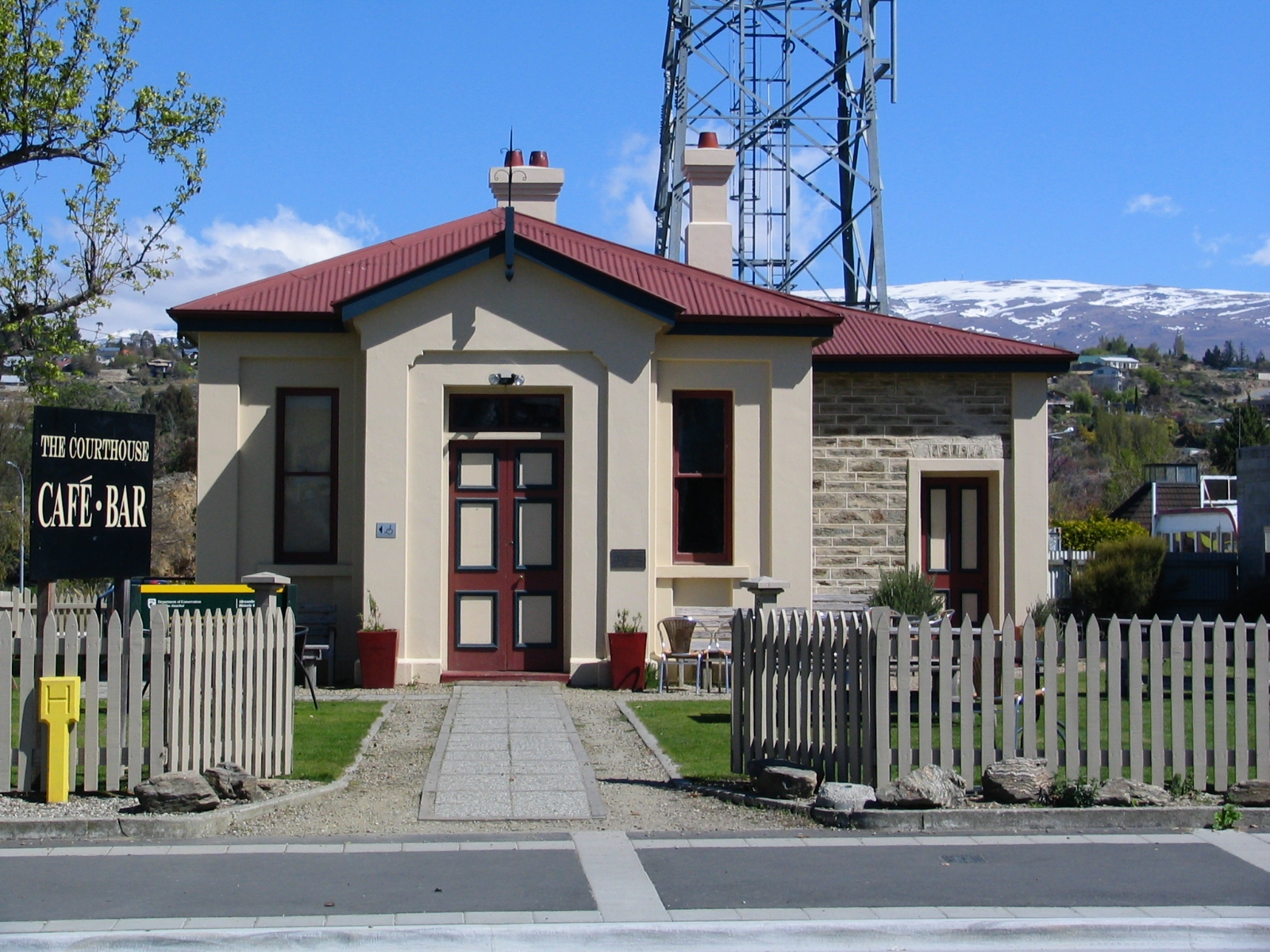
The former Alexandra Courthouse

The old courthouse located in Alexandra's Centennial Avenue was opened on 16 June 1879, it housed both the Warden's and Magistrate's Courts. it was built of stone. As mining was the main industry at the time the Warden's Court was kept busy dealing with issues relating to mining. These included registration of claims and dealing with matters such as water races, business, licenses, roads, forgeries and other similar issues relating to mining. The Magistrate's Court dealt with general legal matters. It was used as a courthouse until 1972. It is a Category 2 Historic Building. In 2006 the chimneys were renovated and it was repainted. It now operates as a cafe.

=== Vallance cottage ===
Vallance Cottage is a mud brick house built in 1896. It was home to a family of eleven at one stage. It is a category 2 listed building with Heritage New Zealand. In the 1970s, Vallance Cottage still had no running water inside and only cold running water in the separate wash-house.

== Mokomoko dryland sanctuary ==
In 2005, a group of Alexandra residents formed the Central Otago Ecological Trust. They aimed to reintroduce fauna that has been lost from the Alexandra basin. They established, in partnership with a number of other organisations, the Mokomoko Dryland Sanctuary. This lies near Alexandra in the hilly county. They established a 1.6 kilometre long predator proof fence which surrounds 14 hectares of land. This is now allowing native dryland vegetation to reestablish itself and a number of species of lizards and invertebrates to repopulate the sanctuary.

In 2018, around 150 skinks and geckos were introduced to the Mokomoko Dryland Sanctuary. Lizards that are endemic to the area include the Otago skink which can grow up to 300mm in total length jewelled geckos have also been introduced to the sanctuary. These were transferred from the Lammermoor Range. and the grand skink.

== Media ==
=== Radio stations ===
Following Mediaworks corporate 2013 decision to move all Central Otago and Lakes District live broadcast activity to Queenstown, Alexandra was left without a local radio station until the creation of independently owned Classic Gold Central in September 2013 on Blossom Festival Weekend. Transmitting from a co-site with Radio Rhema in the Waikerikeri Valley on 91.9FM, the station, owned by longtime broadcasters Chris Diack and Bill Willis, has re-established the service of providing local information for the district. Classic Gold Central was re-branded as Local Radio Central sometime before 2018. On 1 April 2018 the station was purchased by new owners, who again re-branded the station as Radio Central. From 1 April 2018 Radio Central had transmitters located at Waikerikeri Valley (91.9), Cromwell (91.9), Roxburgh (94.3) and Wedderburn (104.3).

Independently owned radio station Blue Skies FM was established in 2001 to serve the local community, broadcasting to the Alexandra basin, Cromwell, the Maniototo, Teviot Valley and beyond. Blue Skies FM ceased broadcasting at the end of September 2008 following a move by Mediaworks, who successfully negotiated a deal to take on the frequency to rebroadcast its Easy Listening Brand, The Breeze.

Alexandra once had its own local More FM station with the studios based in Alexandra. Previously, the station was known as Radio Central. Central Otago's More FM broadcasts into Roxburgh, Clyde and Cromwell. Wānaka also has More FM, relayed from the Queenstown More FM station formerly known as Resort Radio. Central Otago's More FM is now networked from Studios in Queenstown.

Alexandra features a number of local FM stations that operate on the New Zealand Government's "low power FM" scheme, including Classic Gold on 107.3FM and XS80s on 106.7FM. These stations operate on short range covering the main township only.

== Mayors ==
Alexandra is now administered by the Central Otago District Council, with the current mayor being Tamah Alley.

Many streets in Alexandra are named after mayors of the former Alexandra Borough.

1867–1897	1898–1940	1940–1989
Robert Finlay 1867–1870 and 1886–1889	James Kelman 1898–1899 and 1901–1903	Archibald McKellar 1940–1947
John Chapple 1871–1872	Henry Symes 1900–1901	Bert Fox 1947–1953
William Beresford 1872–1873	George Spencer 1903–1906	George Campbell 1953–1959
James Samson 1873–1878	Henry Schaumann 1906–1910	Keith Blackmore 1959–1980
James Rivers 1878–1879 and 1894–1896	J Gregg 1910–1911	Ross Close 1980–1986
George McDonald 1882–1884	Edward Marslin 1911–1915	Russell Poole 1986–1989
JE Thompson 1884–1886	Archibald Ashworth 1915–1917	
William Theyers 1890–1892 and 1895–1896	William Black 1917–1927	
James Simmonds 1880–1882, 1892–1894 and 1896–1897	William Bringans 1927–1940	

== Government ==
Alexandra is currently part of the Southland electorate which was held in 2023 by Joseph Mooney of the National Party.

== See also ==
- Molyneux Park
