= Manuherikia River =

Coordinates: 45°16′S 169°24′E

Manuherekia River
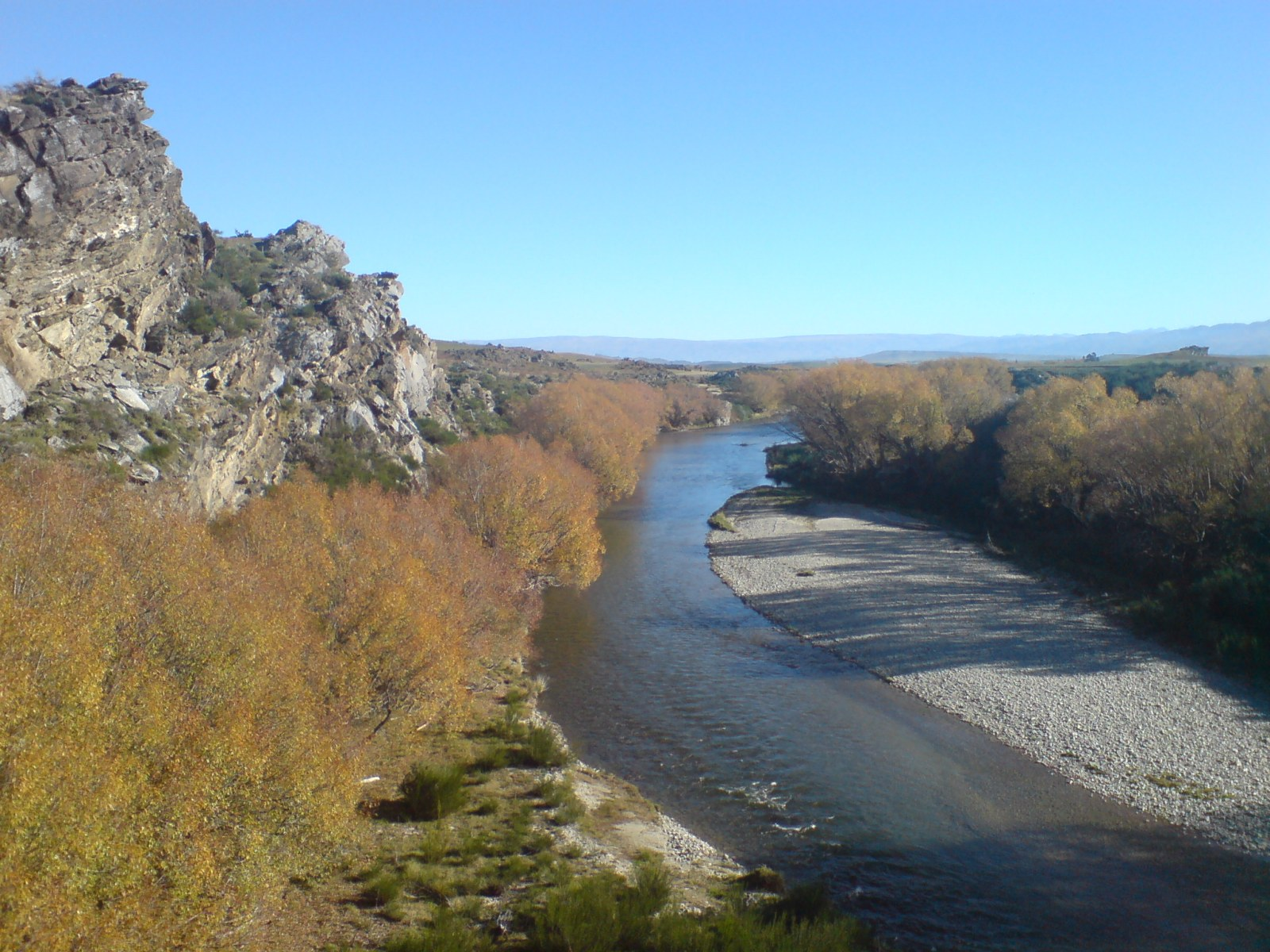
- Manuherekia River flowing south near Poolburn Gorge

Location
- Country: New Zealand

Physical characteristics
- Source
  - location: Maniototo
- Mouth
  - location: Clutha River
  - elevation: 132 m (433 ft)
- Length: 85 km (53 mi)

The Manuherekia River is located in Otago in the South Island of New Zealand. It rises in the far north of the Maniototo, with the West Branch draining the eastern side of the St Bathans Range, and the East Branch draining the western flanks of the Hawkdun Range. The river continues southwest through the wide Manuherekia Valley to its confluence with the Clutha River at Alexandra. During the 1860s the Manuherekia was one of the centres of the Otago gold rush.

The river is crossed by two historically significant bridges, the curved Manuherekia Bridge No.1 (number 70 on the Otago Central Railway line), a concrete pier bridge completed in 1903, and a stone pier bridge at Ophir built in 1880.

The common spelling for the river was previously "Manuherikia", but the Kāi Tahu Māori spelling for the river, meaning "at long last", has been adopted by officials in recent years.

The river has been the subject of contentious debate around water allocation, minimum flows, irrigation, and ecological values, which remains unresolved.

== See also ==
- List of rivers of New Zealand
