= Otago Central Rail Trail =

New Zealand rail trail

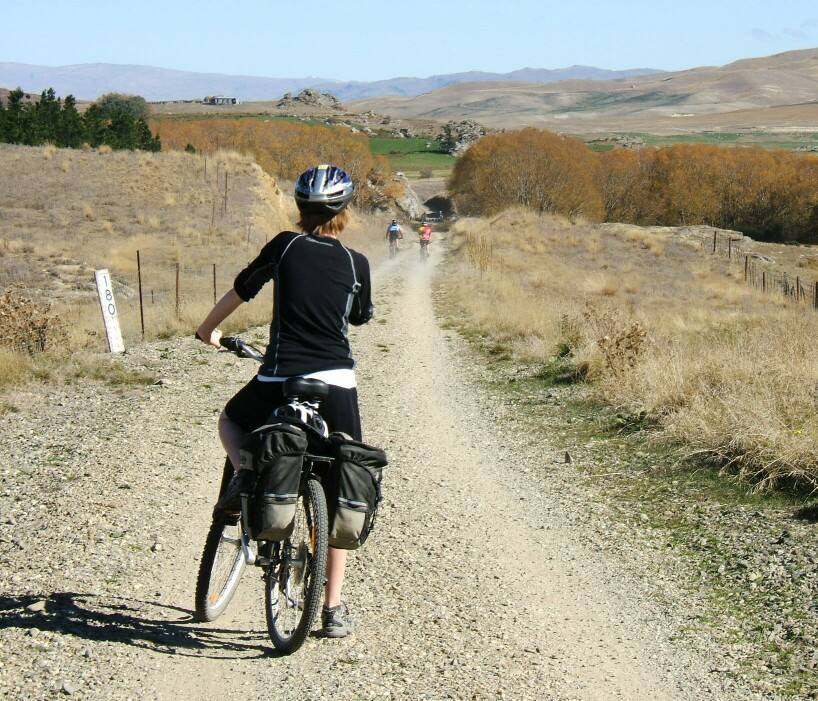
- On the Otago Central Rail Trail
- Length: 150 km
- Location: Otago region, New Zealand
- Trailheads: Middlemarch; 45°30′11″S 170°07′33″E; Clyde; 45°11′41″S 169°20′08″E
- Use: Walking; Cycling; Horse riding
- Highest point: 618 m (2,028 ft)
- Difficulty: Moderate
- Season: Year round
- Sights: Otago Central landscape, railway viaducts
- Website: www.otagocentralrailtrail.co.nz

The Otago Central Rail Trail is a 150-kilometre walking, cycling and horse riding track in the South Island of New Zealand. A pioneering project for New Zealand, the successful rail trail joined the New Zealand Cycle Trail umbrella organisation in 2012, having been one of the inspirations for it.

The trail runs in an arc between Middlemarch and Clyde, along the route of the former Otago Central Railway. The trail has become a popular tourist attraction, with 10,000–12,000 users per year as a conservative estimate, and yearly (and ongoing) user increases for 6 out of the last 7 years (as of 2011). The trail is also accepted as being, by a large margin, the biggest non-farming economic factor in the Maniototo-Alexandra area.

== History ==
The original railway line was completed at the turn of the 20th century, and provided a link between Central Otago and Dunedin until closure in April 1990. The first 64 km from the junction with the Main South Line in Wingatui remain operational; the initial 4 km form KiwiRail's Taieri Industrial Siding and the remaining 60 km through the Taieri Gorge to Middlemarch is operated by Dunedin Railways as a tourist attraction. The New Zealand Department of Conservation recognised that the remainder of the route to Clyde had potential as a recreational facility, and bought the formation after the rails and sleepers had been salvaged.

Since, the trail has come to be recognised as an important feature of the region, highlighted for example by strong interest from numerous groups in a 2011 workshop, where 120 people attended to discuss the further future of the trail, and how to encourage users to stay in the area for longer.

The success of the rail trail played an important role in ensuring the New Zealand Cycle Trail project succeeded in gaining funding, and was cited as an example of the kind of infrastructure the project is to provide by New Zealand's Prime Minister John Key.

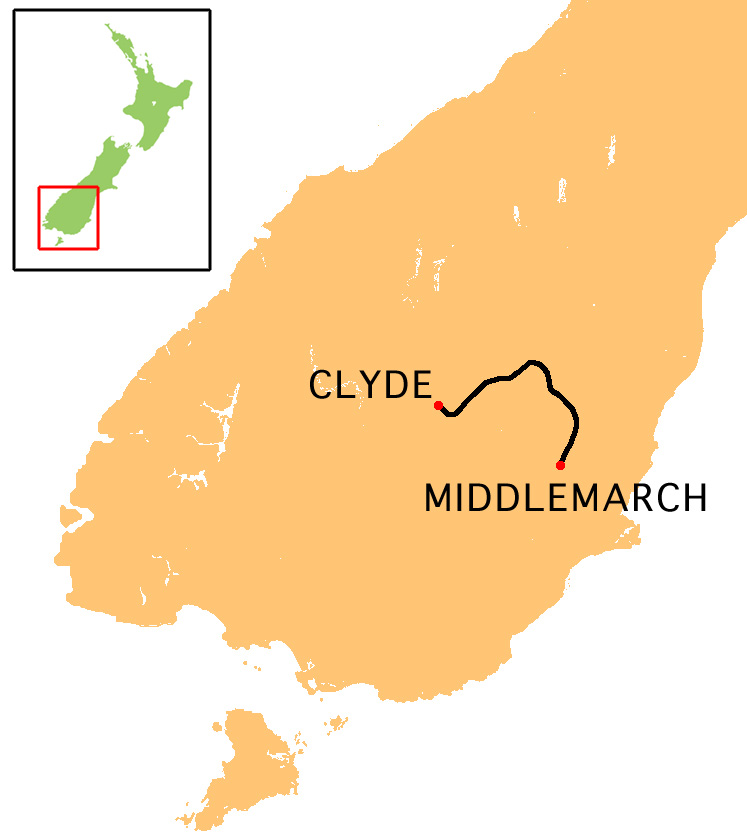
Location of the rail trail.

== Trail walking / cycling ==
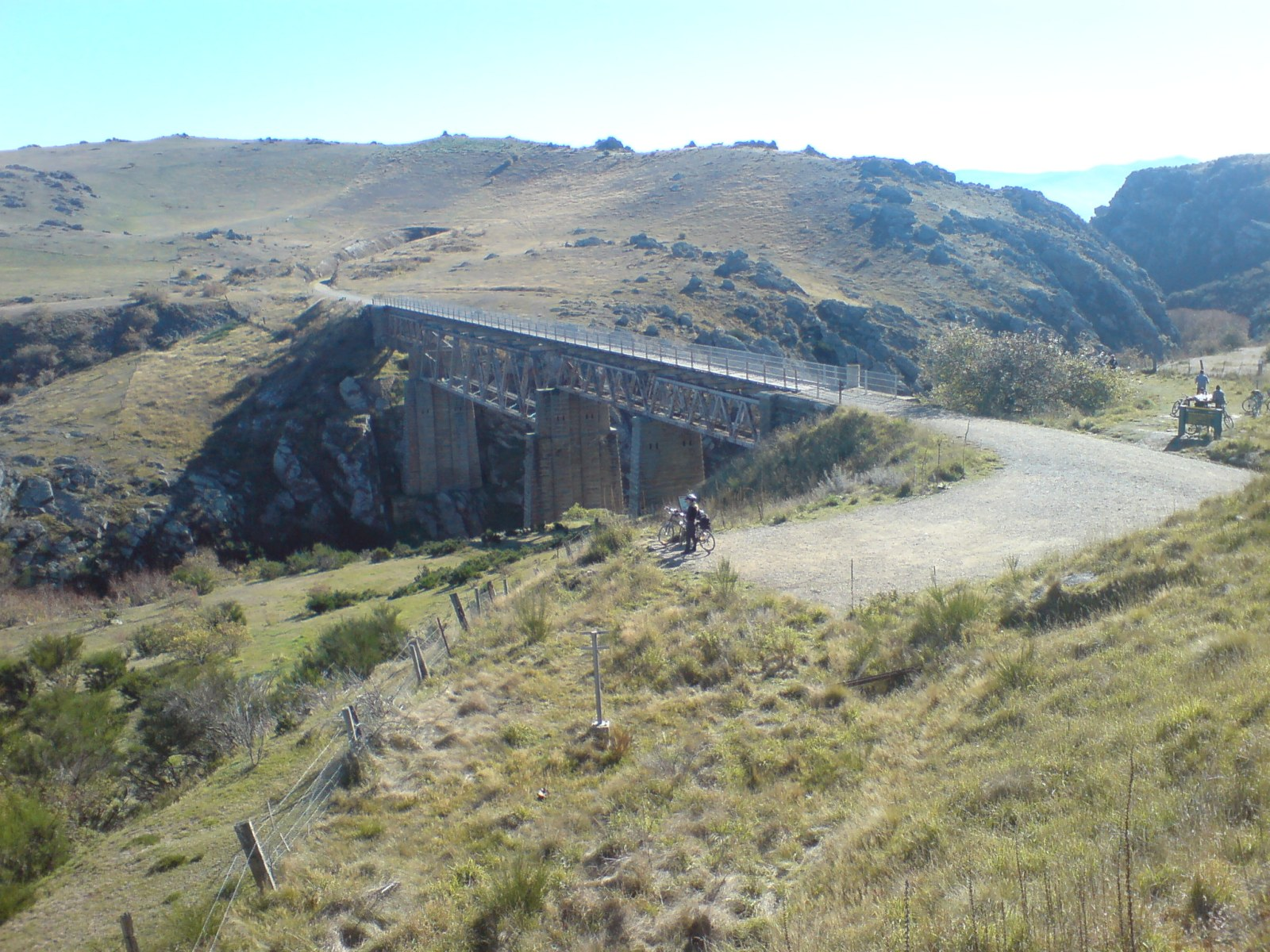
Poolburn Viaduct, one of the former rail bridges re-established for the cycle trail.

The trail starts at Middlemarch in the east, loops north through the spectacular countryside of the Strath Taieri and the Maniototo to end at Clyde, on the banks of the Clutha River. The return journey to Middlemarch or Dunedin can be made on foot or by bicycle over the historic Old Dunstan Road, used by the early gold miners to access Central Otago. It traverses open country with little accommodation or food between the typical stops. Users need to be self-sufficient for much of each day.

Towns in the area have, however, developed facilities for trail users, and companies have been developed to aid travellers on the trail, such as transporting luggage between destinations. Due to the increasing numbers of pubs now available on the track route, the trail has also been nicknamed the 'Ale Trail'.

To enjoy the scenery, the engineering involved in building the railway and the towns and people along the way, 5–7 days should be allowed to walk the Trail or 3–5 days to cycle it. The trail starts at 201 metres (660 ft) above sea level in Middlemarch and rises at its highest point to 618 metres (2,028 ft) between Ranfurly and Oturehua. On the journey it passes through three tunnels (the two Poolburn Gorge Tunnels and the Prices Creek Tunnel) and over several large viaducts. A torch (flashlight) is advised for the tunnels. The trail is well maintained and signposted. Toilets are available at several points and the contours are best described as easy, having been built to allow steam trains to climb the gentle inclines even in winter, with frost on the rails.

The trail passes through or past several small towns. Mountain bikes can be rented from outlets in Middlemarch, Ranfurly, Alexandra and Clyde. Some of these cycle shops will also provide transport for riders and bikes, and will move luggage. The trail is very popular, and accommodation should be booked well in advance during busy periods such as long weekends and holidays.

The trail passes through one of the few parts of New Zealand to have a continental climate, with extremes of temperature common. Midsummer daytime temperatures frequently climb above 28 °C (82 °F), and winters can include entire days with a temperature staying below freezing point. One known issue on the trail can be the strong winds that can develop from the nearby mountain ranges under certain weather conditions, slowing riders going in the wrong direction to a crawl.

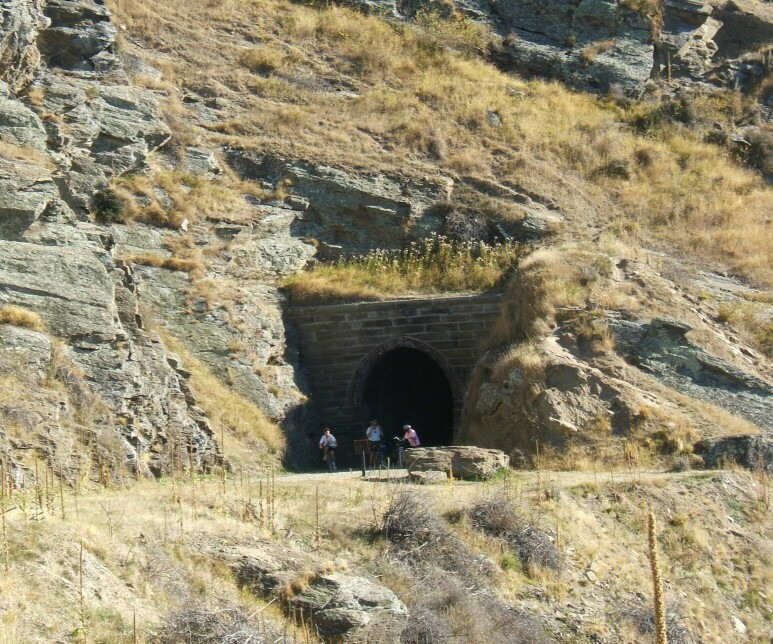
On the Rail Trail

The manager of the trail, the Otago Central Rail Trail Charitable Trust, has a website and publishes a leaflet that provides detailed information on the route, and advertisements for businesses providing services to users of the trail. There are visitor information centres in Alexandra, Cromwell, Roxburgh, Ranfurly and Dunedin. Several books on the trail and the surrounding area can be purchased at bookshops throughout New Zealand.

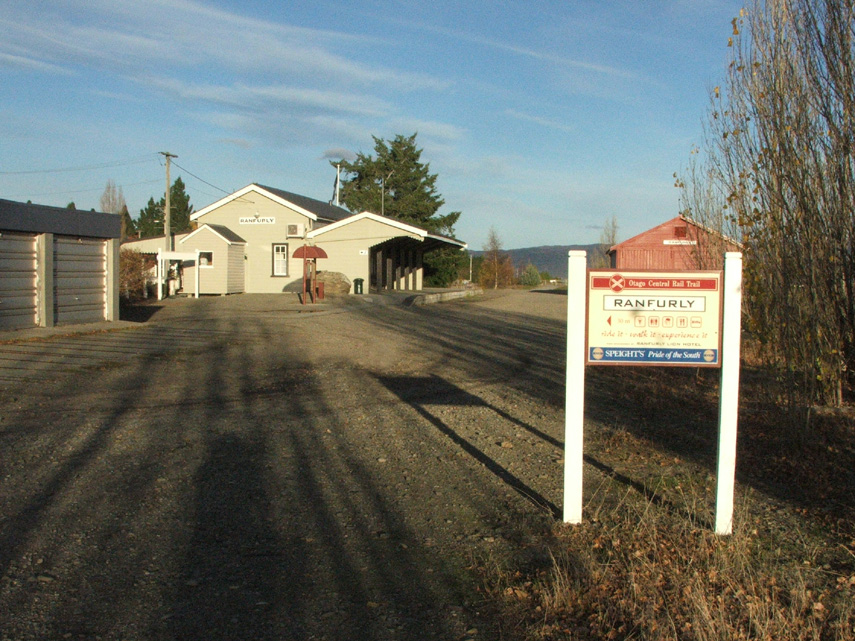
The Otago Central Rail Trail at Ranfurly

== Usage / Statistics ==
The trail is used by 10,000–12,000 users per year as a conservative estimate (14,000 in other estimates) and up to 80,000 further (mostly local) users of part sections. The Poolburn Gorge section was the most popular, with around 24,000 yearly users. Trail patronage is counted using electronic counters, with the numbers at four remote locations extrapolated to estimate the whole trail usage, as not all riders ride the full trail.

The users of the trail have been shown as approximately 9% guided tour customers, 50% independent travellers (renting a bicycle) and 41% New Zealanders bringing their own bicycles.

A business evaluation has credited the trail with supporting around 1,000 full and part-time jobs, and having created 200 additional or part-time jobs.

Annual maintenance and development costs for the trail have been estimated at somewhat over $316,000.

== See also ==
- New Zealand Cycle Trail (a New Zealand-wide trail system, of which the Otago Central Rail Trail is a part of as well as a forerunner)
