= Central Otago =

Region in New Zealand

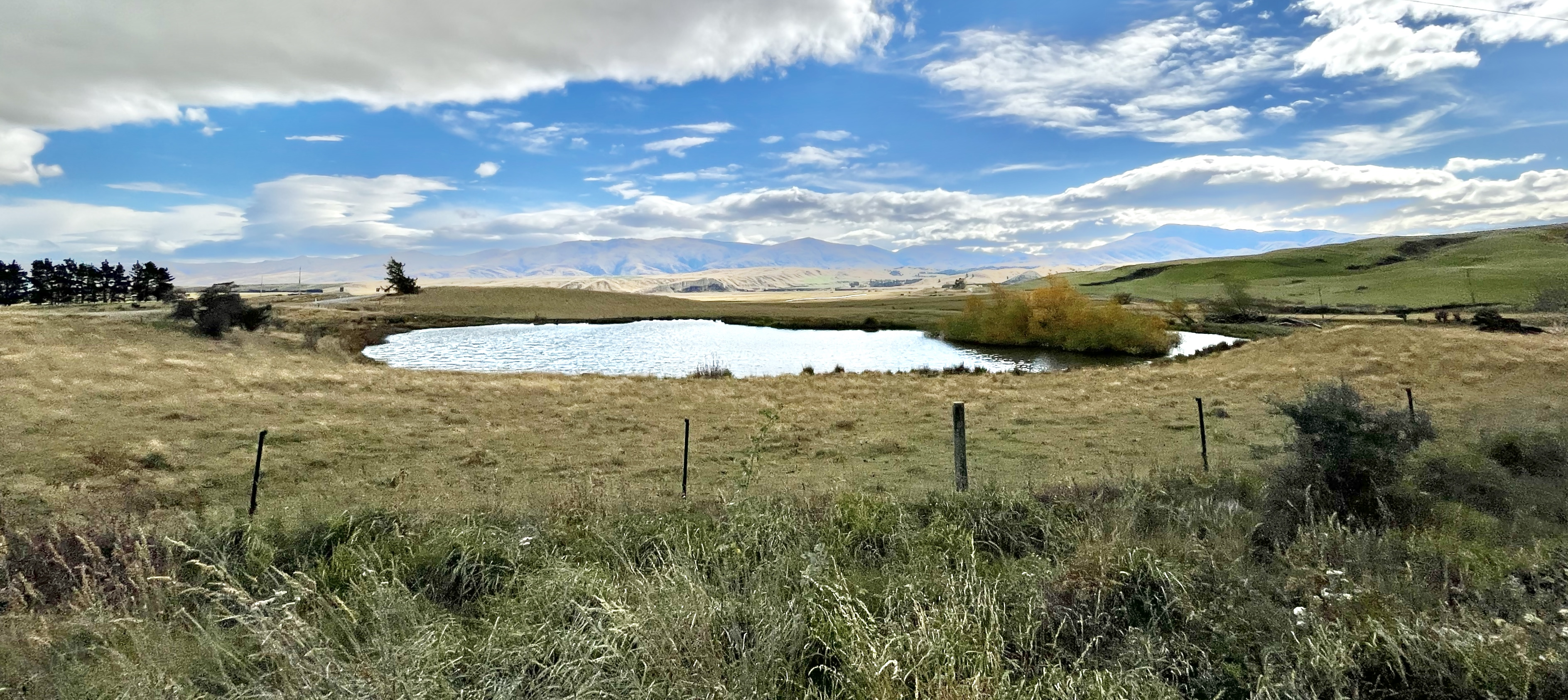
Arid landscape of Central Otago

Central Otago is an area located in the inland part of the Otago region in the South Island of New Zealand. The motto for the area is "A World of Difference".

The area is dominated by mountain ranges and the upper reaches of the Clutha River and tributaries. The wide flat plateau of the Maniototo which lies between the upper reaches of the Taieri River and the Clutha's northern tributary the Manuherikia is also part of Central Otago.

Characterised by cold winters and hot, dry summers, the area is only lightly populated. First significant European occupation came with the discovery of gold at Gabriel's Gully near Lawrence in 1861, which led to the Otago gold rush. Other towns and villages include Alexandra, Bannockburn, Clyde, Cromwell, Millers Flat, Naseby, Omakau, Ranfurly, Roxburgh, St. Bathans, and Wedderburn.

Since the 19th century, most of the area's economic activity has centred on sheep, stone fruit, and tourism. In recent years, deer farms and vineyards have increased the region's economic diversification. Central Otago is the world's southernmost commercial wine production region. Recently the cool climate varieties Riesling and Pinot noir have been recognised as being especially suitable, and as the vines age Central Otago wines can be expected to improve even further, as the plantings are new and increasing rapidly.

== Administration ==
The Central Otago District Council, based in Alexandra, administers territorial authority matters, while the Otago Regional Council has overview of environmental matters such as clean air and water resources.

== Climate ==
Central Otago is the driest region of New Zealand, receiving less than 400 mm of rainfall annually. The seasons are sharply defined: summers are hot and low in humidity; winter mornings are often misty, the days cloudless and windless and the nights freezing. Alexandra, for example, has the lowest average annual rainfall (340 millimetres or 13.4 inches) recorded anywhere in New Zealand, is the least windy and has 148 frosts annually (only Lake Tekapo, with 149, has more). Ophir, 27 kilometres or 17 miles away, holds the record for the lowest air temperature recorded – −21.6 °C or −6.9 °F in mid-1995 – but it also held the highest reading (35.2 °C or 95.4 °F in 1959) until 42.4 °C (108.3 °F) was recorded at Rangiora, in Canterbury in 1973.

Spring warms the soil and fruit tree blossom dominates the district's orchard areas. Temperatures range from −3 to 20 °C (26.6 to 68.0 °F) with 10 frosts a month. Average rainfall is 28 millimetres (1.1 in) a month and sunshine 206 hours per month.

In summer, daylight lasts as long as 10 P.M.. Temperatures range from 10 to 30 °C (50 to 86 °F) on several days. Rainfall averages 38 millimetres (1.5 in) a month and sunshine 227 hours per month.

Autumn is brilliant as the extensive orchards and poplar shelterbelts turn red, yellow and gold. Temperatures range from −3 to 24 °C (26.6 to 75.2 °F). Rainfall averages 30 millimetres (1.2 in) a month with 11 frosts monthly and 150 hours of sunshine.

Winter brings a temperature range of −6 to 15 °C (21.2 to 59.0 °F), and average monthly rainfall of 15 millimetres (0.6 in), 25 days with frosts and 107 hours of sunshine per month during the short days.

== "Central" ==
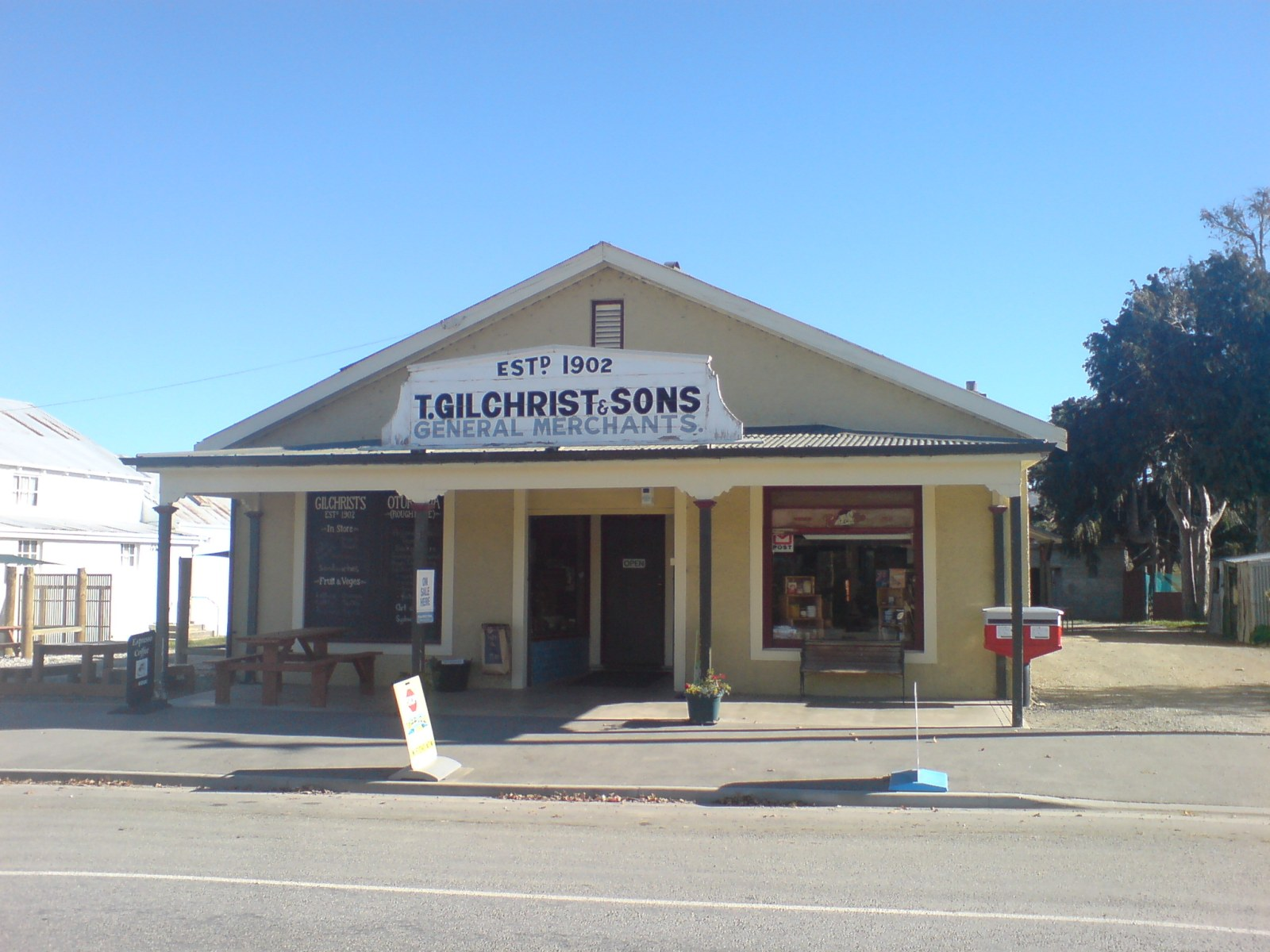
T. Gilchrist & Sons in Oturehua boasts being the oldest existing shop in New Zealand, established 1902, and since 1987 operated by a community trust (but still working as a normal grocery).

The colloquial name for Central Otago is simply "Central". Residents from the surrounding regions may not talk about being in Central Otago or going to Central Otago – instead referring to being or going "up Central" (this usage is mainly limited to residents of Canterbury, Otago and Southland). The former Otago Central Railway, which ran through most of the major towns of Central Otago, was also referred to as 'the Central'.

Areas around the area governed by the Central Otago District Council area are also often simply known as Central, such as Arrowtown, Queenstown and Wānaka.

== See also ==
- Clara Evelyn Hallam
- Otago Central Rail Trail
- Central Otago wine region
