= List of motorcycle rallies in the Pacific Northwest =

This is a list of motorcycle rallies in Alaska and the Pacific Northwest region of the United States. Rallies are annual unless noted.

Name	Place	Attendance	Inaugurated	Organizer	Notes
Sky Valley Antique & Classic Motorcycle Show (called Snohomish Antique Bike Show until 2009)	Snohomish, Washington	22,000 (2008)	1997	ABATE local chapter	Held in Sultan or Everett 2009–2011 due to increased police costs related to concerns of motorcycle gang violence
Oyster Run	Anacortes, Washington	20,000 (est.)	1981	City of Anacortes/Oyster Run Committee	Called the largest Northwest rally in 2014
Hogs and Dogs	West Richland, Washington	10,000 attendees, 4,000 motorcycles (2009)	2001	West Richland Area Chamber of Commerce	Hot dog feed, concerts
Hells Canyon Rally	Hells Canyon	5,000–8,000	2000	Todd Godfrey of High Desert Harley-Davidson	This rally meets in Baker City, Oregon for four days in July. There are several rides in the area, including a ride through Hells Canyon to the dam.
BMW Motorcycle Owners of America 2004 national rally	Spokane, Washington	6,500	2004 (not annual)	BMW Motorcycle Owners of America	
Sun and Surf Motorcycle Run	Ocean Shores, Washington	3,000–4,000 (2012)	1988 or 1989	Sun and Surf Charity 501(c)(3), Issaquah	100% of proceeds benefit Seattle Children's and other charities; started in 1980s by Lynnwood Harley Owners Group members who couldn't go to Sturgis rally
Hog Wild Rally	Quinault Nation casino near Ocean Shores, Washington	151 registered, 5,000 attendees claimed (2013)	2009	Quinault Nation, operated by Roadshows, Inc.	Same weekend as Sun and Surf, also in Ocean Shores
Run to the Cascades	Prineville or Redmond, Oregon	3,000 (2012)	Before 2001	Aaron Myhra	Re-started in 2011 as 9/11 memorial event after 10 year hiatus; 2012 event shut down by sheriff due to motorcycle gang clash. 2013 event planned at Warm Springs cancelled.
Spring Opener	Toppenish, Washington fairgrounds	3,000 (1999)	1990s	ABATE local chapter	
Iron Horse Trail Motorcycle Show	Ellensburg, Washington	3,000 (2011)	2009	ABATE local chapter	110-mile (180 km) rally including visit at Wild Horse Wind Farm
Good Vibrations Motorcycle Rally	Salem, Oregon	1,750 (2010)	2010	Roadshows, Inc.	Discontinued 2014
Pacific Northwest H.O.G. Rally	Spokane Valley, Washington	1,600 (2014)	2014	Harley Owners Group local chapter	2014 was first tri-state rally; formerly Washington, Oregon and Idaho rallies
Teddy Bear Run	Auburn, Washington	Hundreds to 1,200 (2013)	1999	Alky Angels South King County chapter	Benefits children at MultiCare Health System's Auburn Regional Medical Center
Republic Rally	Republic, Washington	950 (2012)–970 (2008)	2008	Republic Motorcycle Rally Association	
Isle of Vashon TT	Vashon Island, Washington	800 (2012)	1983	Vintage Motorcycle Enthusiasts, Seattle	Attendance intentionally kept low by not announcing event date outside of club membership.
Polar Bear Run	Portland–Oregon City	700 (2000)	1985	Christian Motorcyclists Association Portland chapter	Billed as the West Coast's largest Polar Bear event for motorcyclists
Hoka Hey Motorcycle Challenge	Key West, Florida–Homer, Alaska	600 (2010)	2010	Jim and Beth Durham	Long-distance rally
Bike Fest	Cottage Grove, Oregon	400 (2008)–700 (2009)	2005 (disestablished 2014)	STAR Touring and Riding Association chapter	
Chief Joseph Rally	John Day, Oregon	520 (2014)	by 2000	BMW Riders of Oregon	
Rose City Oregon 500	Tigard, Oregon out and back	500	1974	Rose City Motorcycle Club	500 miles in one day. Oldest NW rally?
Chris Kilcullen Memorial Ride	Eugene–Bend, Oregon	400 (2014)	2011	Kilcullen Project	
Rose City Oregon 250	Tigard, Oregon out and back	400	1992	Rose City Motorcycle Club	250 miles in one day
Cascade Country Rendezvous	Cashmere, Washington July 2025 (alternates)	400 (c. 2000)	1974	Washington State BMW Riders Club	Oldest PNW rally?
GWRRA Washington Rally	Northwest Washington Fair fairgrounds, Lynden	375 (2008)	1981?	Gold Wing Road Riders Association (GWRRA) Washington District	
Portland Alley Sweeper Urban Enduro	Portland, Oregon	300	2009	Sang-Froid Riding Club, Portland	
Alaska State H.O.G. Rally	Tanana Valley State Fair fairgrounds, Fairbanks, Alaska (2015)	"hundreds"	by 2006	Harley Owners Group Interior Alaska chapter	2014 rally between Wasilla–Anchorage
Sportbike Northwest	Maryhill Loops Road, Goldendale, Washington	200 (2006)	2003	Sound Rider!	
Ride for Kids	Carnation, Washington	200 (2014)	1991 or 1993	Mike Traynor (founder), Pediatric Brain Tumor Foundation	Benefit; paired with event at Barber Motorsports Park in Alabama.
Northwest Firefighters Bike Rally	Republic, Washington	130 (2010)	2009	Brian Kendall	
Western States 1000	Tigard–Beaverton, Oregon out and back	130 (2009)	1989	Tourcade Inc. and Rose City Motorcycle Club	1,000-mile (1,600 km), two-day long-distance rally
Brian Fisher Memorial ride	Ocean Shores, Washington	100 (2013)	2007	King County Corrections Guild	
Hyder Seek	Sumas, Washington–Hyder, Alaska	60 (2012)	1998	Iron Butt Association (IBA)	IBA long-distance rally
Gold Rush Ride	Portland–Sumpter, Oregon	32 (2005)	by 2005	Sang-Froid Riding Club, Portland	On- and off-road 1,000-mile (1,600 km) long-distance rally
Bonehead Enduro	Snoqualmie, Washington		1994	Vintage Motorcycle Enthusiasts, Seattle	Off-road scavenger hunt
Iron Butt Rally	Kennewick, Washington	71 finishers out of 97 entrants	2019 (not annual – start of leg two)	Iron Butt Association	Long-distance rally – 2019 winner covered 13,000 miles (21,000 km)
