= Burapa Bike Week =

Annual motorcycle rally in Pattaya, Chonburi, Thailand

Burapa Bike Week is a multi-day motorcycle rally that takes place annually in Pattaya, Thailand. The show is opened by the former Minister of Culture Sontaya Kunplome and Burapa Motorcycle Club President Prasan Kikaji. It was founded in 1997 by a group of Thai motorcyclists and takes place every February with a "Ride for Peace" parade through the city and along Jomtien Beach. In the past, around 30,000 to 40,000 people took part in the event, reaching a high of over 50,000 in 2016. Bikers from the United States, Europe and Southeast Asia have traveled to Thailand for this rally. To ensure the safety of the participants in road traffic, Pattaya authorities planned traffic management and safety.

== Event ==
=== Location ===
The venue is a park with paved walkways and grassed areas for the motorcyclists, motorcycle clubs and outlaw motorcycle clubs to showcase the spirit of David Mann (artist) and Easy Rider. With a wide range of custom motorcycles, leather-clad bikers, peace symbols and hippies living the flower power attitude, Burapa Bike Week feels like a combination of Sturgis Motorcycle Rally and Woodstock.

=== Theme ===
The motto identified as the "theme" of Burapa Bike Week is "Incidents that have occurred or are about to occur", like the demonstration to the Tourism Authority of Thailand and the general public that motorcycle clubs respect and appreciate culture of Thailand, therefore referred to as "Staying Strong ". At the 19th Burapa Bike Week 2016 the theme song "Ride for Peace" was changed in favor of a new "Song of Freedom", which focuses on rock music and star guest, guitarist Ron "Bumblefoot" Thal. In 2020, Mayor Sonthaya Khunpluem opened the event together with the President of the Burapa Motorcycle Club, Prasan Nikaji, under the theme "Shadow of Love 2020", which emphasized careful and safe driving.

=== Charity and awareness ===
The audience at Burapa Bike Week is a mix of motorcycle fans, tourists and local Thai people, which is why the "Ride for Peace" rolls for charities and awareness. The "Night Wish Group" was the official sponsor of the event in 2020, and helped to raise funds for the "Boon Choo Special Needs Center" in Sattahip for children and adults in need of care.

=== Peace and crimes ===
For two days in 2012, around 50,000 people attended Burapa Bike Week to promote friendship and partying, which included both Bandidos MC and Hells Angels MC, with no reports of violence or bad behavior.

== Documentary film ==
Burapa – Bikers of the East is an hour-long documentary about the origins of Burapa Bike Week and the Thailand MC community, with their work towards charities and the community. Members of various motorcycle clubs have come together in peace and harmony for the Poker run as a brotherhood to raise money for the production of the film.
