= Dave Preston =

Dave or David Preston may refer to:

- Dave Preston (American football) (born 1955), American football player
- Dave Preston (motorcycling) (born 1947), author
- Dave Preston (producer), record producer with Phil K
- David Preston (banker) (1826–1887), American banker
- David L. Preston (born 1972), American historian
- Dave Preston (volleyball), Canadian volleyball coach; see 2022 FIVB Men's Volleyball Nations League squads
