= E Hayes and Sons =

Hardware store and motor museum in Invercargill

Coordinates: 46°24′28″S 168°20′47″E

E. Hayes & Sons
- Type: Private
- Industry: Hardware store
- Founded: 1932
- Founder: Irving Hayes
- Headquarters: Invercargill, New Zealand
- Area served: Southland Region
- Products: Hardware, clothing, homeware
- Website: ehayes.co.nz

E. Hayes and Sons is a hardware store and automotive display in Invercargill, in the Southland Region of New Zealand. The store was founded in 1932 by Irving Hayes, a descendant of Ernest Hayes, a New Zealand engineer and inventor who founded the Hayes Engineering works in Oturehua, Central Otago, and developed agricultural tools for farms. The hardware store business has remained in family ownership through four generations. The store became part of the nationwide Hammer Hardware franchise group in 1999. Products on offer in the store include hardware, outdoor power equipment, clothing/footwear, homeware and giftware.

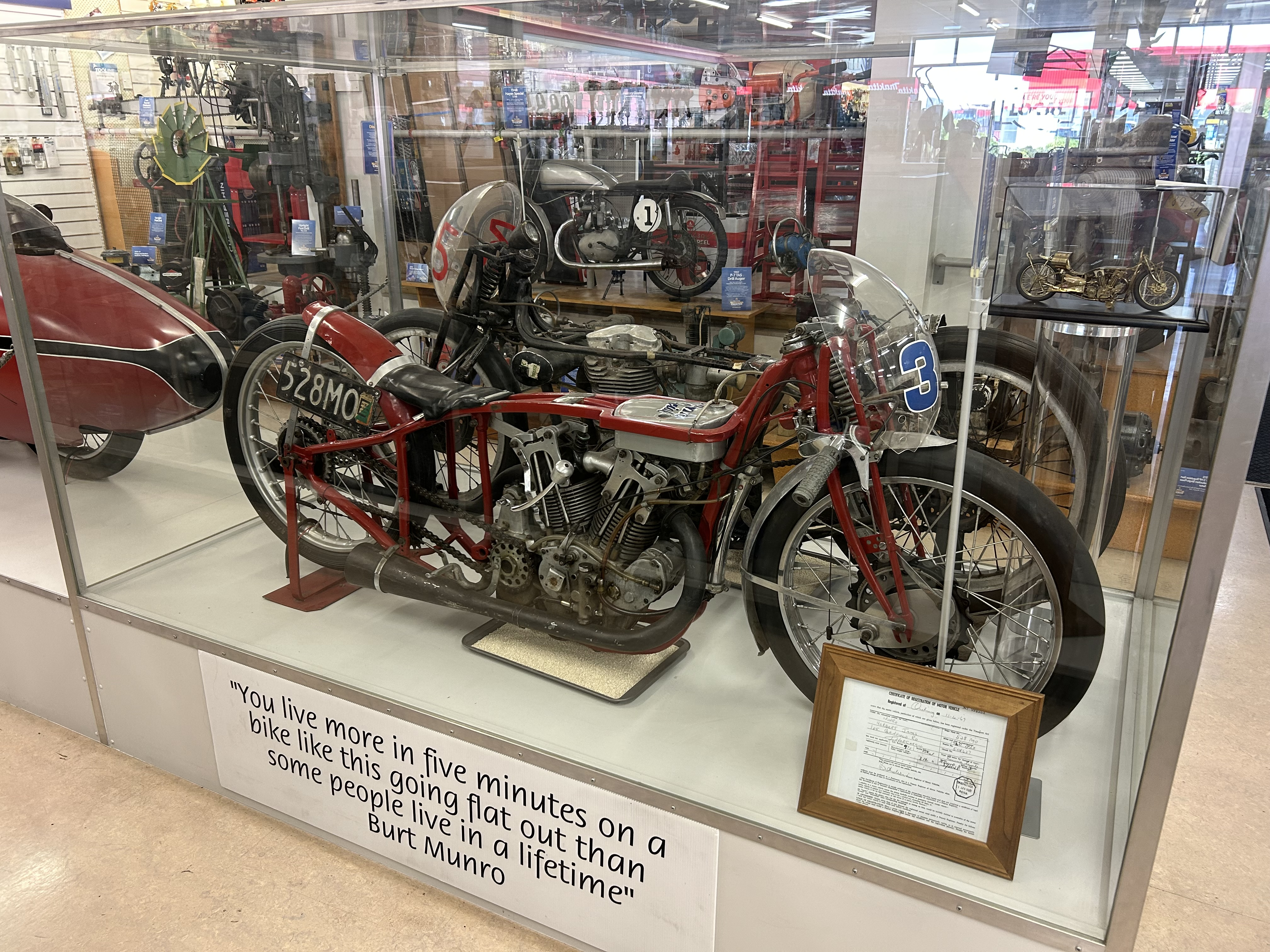
The Burt Munro Special on display at E Hayes and Sons

The store includes the E. Hayes Motorworks Collection that has become a visitor attraction in Invercargill. The display includes around 100 classic and vintage motorcycles, cars and machinery from the Hayes family private collection. Neville Irving Hayes started the collection, and it first went on public display in 2014. A highlight of the collection is the original motorcycle used by Invercargill resident Burt Munro, when he set a new land speed record at Bonneville in 1967 using a highly modified 1920 Indian Scout. After his health deteriorated, in 1977 Munro sold his motorcycles and associated equipment to Norman and Neville Hayes, to ensure that they would remain in Southland. The exhibits in the store include a range of Burt Munro memorabilia, including original wall shelving labelled "Offerings to the God of Speed", containing a large number of pistons that Munro had manufactured for his bikes. The displays also include items used in the making of the 2005 film The World's Fastest Indian. The E. Hayes Motorworks Collection is free to view.
