= Totalview =

Totalview may refer to:

- TotalView, a debugging tool by Rogue Wave Software, formerly TotalView Technologies, Inc.
- TotalView, a GPS-based management system by US Fleet Tracking
- Total View, a road-weather data management system by DTN

== See also ==
- Total Viewing Productions, an affiliate of the Cebu Catholic Television Network
