= Ernest Hayes (engineer) =

New Zealand engineer and inventor

Eben Ernest Hayes (4 February 1851 – 27 June 1933) was a New Zealand engineer and inventor who founded the Hayes Engineering works in Oturehua, Central Otago. He developed a wind turbine and manufactured wind pumps and agricultural tools for farms.

== Early life ==
Eben Ernest Hayes was born at Monks Kirby, England, on 4 February 1851, the first of 10 children of Ebenezer Hayes and Hannah Jones. Ernest was educated locally, then apprenticed as a millwright, learning fitting and turning, remodelling machinery and dressing millstones. Hayes married Hannah Eleanora Pearson at Whitington, Norfolk, on 15 February 1881 and emigrated to New Zealand at Port Chalmers on 14 November 1882.

Hayes settled in Central Otago, running flour mills and developing a 150-acre (61-hectare) farm with a small workshop, where he began to invent tools to help his farm work.

== Inventor ==
In 1895, Hayes began to manufacture tools and agricultural equipment, establishing a workshop that became his engineering works. In 1910 Hayes built his first wind turbine to power the workshop; he replaced this with a Pelton wheel in 1927. Apart from windpumps, developed in 1912, Hayes' principal inventions are various types of wire strainer, used for applying tension to wire fences.

One of Hayes' products was a chain grab wire strainer tool with two clamps to hold the wires. The tension is applied by alternately moving the jaws of the mechanism along the chain. Once the wires are sufficiently strained they are looped together and tied. Hayes began development of the strainer tool in 1905 and refined it in five versions until the final version in 1924. The Hayes strainer became well known in the farming community, and was exported to 30 countries. In 1981, the New Zealand Industrial Design Council recognised the smooth grip chain wire strainer with a Designmark award. As of 2025, the Hayes smooth grip chain strainer is still in production.

== Hayes Engineering ==
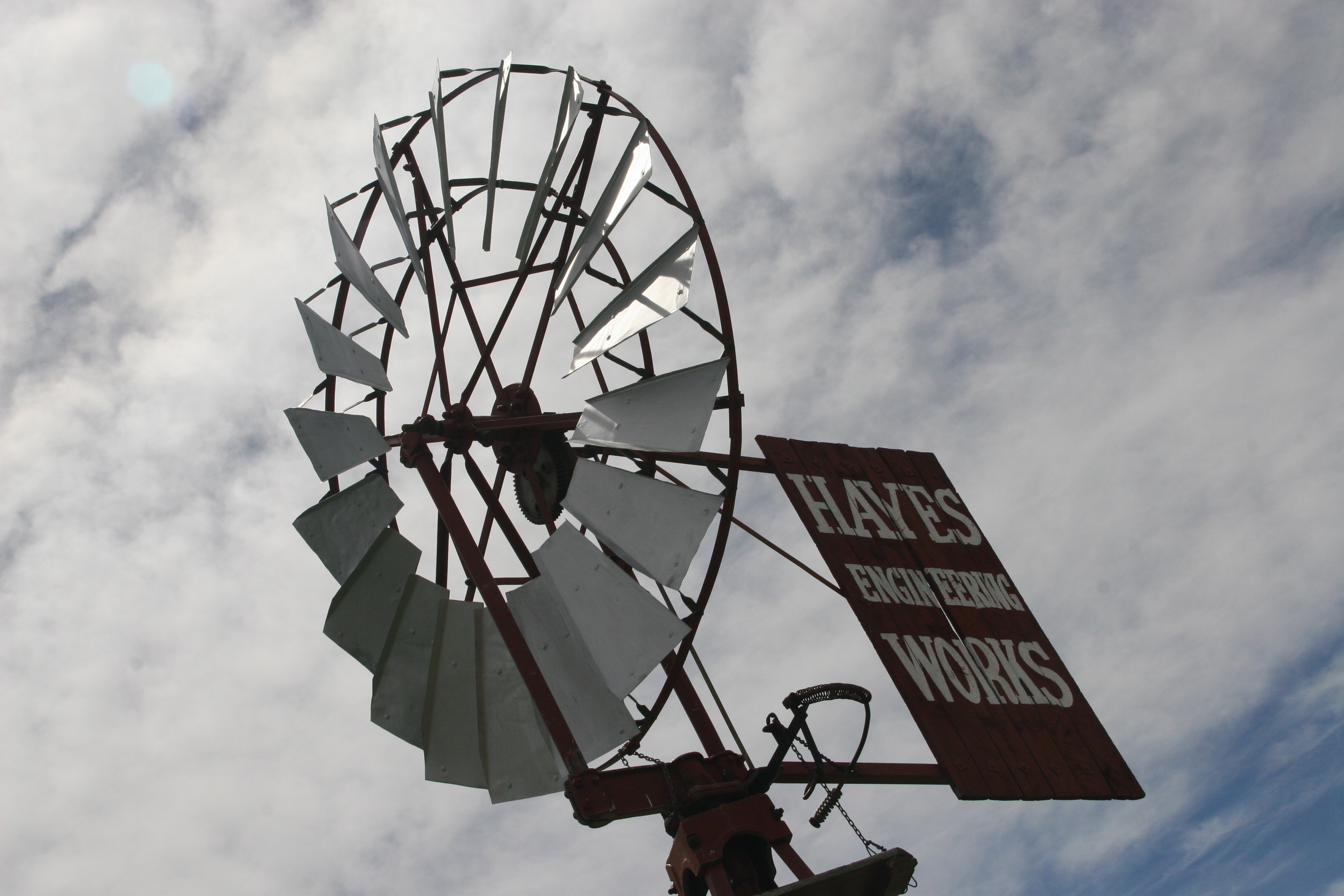
Hayes Engineering Works windmill

The original Hayes Engineering works in Oturehua was powered by a series of mechanical shafts, pulleys and belts. The works was purchased by the New Zealand Historic Places Trust Pouhere Taonga in 1975 and is maintained in a semi-working condition open to the public as an example of 19th-century building and engineering.

Hayes' farming products are now marketed by Tru-Test Ltd and include wire strainers, wire dispensers, fence post tools, crimping tools, crimping sleeves and farm gates.

== Later life ==
Hayes achieved a national reputation for his products and an export market, then retired in ill health in 1926. The works were at the peak of production when he died at his home on 27 June 1933. Hayes' wife Hannah Hayes died on 2 June 1946 and the business shifted to Christchurch in 1952.

== E Hayes and Sons ==
The family firm's Invercargill store, E Hayes and Sons founded by Hayes' son Irving Hayes in 1932, still exists as a hardware store; memorabilia from Southland inventor and motorcyclist Burt Munro (depicted in The World's Fastest Indian) is displayed in the store's museum.

== See also ==
- Project Hayes, a wind power project named for Eben Ernest Hayes
