= Golden Aspen Rally =

Motorcycle Rally

- Locations: Ruidoso, New Mexico, USA
- Founded: 1969
- Attendance: 30,000
- Website: motorcyclerally.com

The Golden Aspen Rally, formerly Aspencade, is an annual motorcycle rally. Along with Americade in New York and the Lone Star Rally in Texas, it is one of the American Motorcyclist Association's three annual rallies, drawing an estimated 30,000 attendees. It is held annually on the third week of September in Ruidoso, New Mexico and was ongoing from 1969 to 2019, and will resume in 2021.

The COVID-19 pandemic caused 2020's rally to be cancelled.
