= Sound Rider! =

Monthly motorcycling magazine

- Categories: Motorcycling, motorcycle touring
- Frequency: Monthly (online)
- Publisher: Tom Mehren
- Founder: Tom Mehren
- Founded: 1999
- Company: Mixed MEDIA
- Country: United States
- Based in: Seattle, Washington
- Language: English
- Website: soundrider.com

Sound RIDER! began as a monthly online magazine about motorcycling in the Pacific Northwest. It was founded by publisher Tom Mehren in 1999. The magazine features editorial about people, places and events associated with motorcycling in the Northwest region. In addition it features used motorcycle listings, and a number of databases specific to dealers, services and clubs in the area. The editorial content is archived for viewing past its initial month of publication.

Notable contributors to the magazine include Motorcycle Hall of Fame motorcycle safety author David L. Hough and motorcycle instructional author Dave Preston. The website has online store with motorcycling related items.

== Events ==
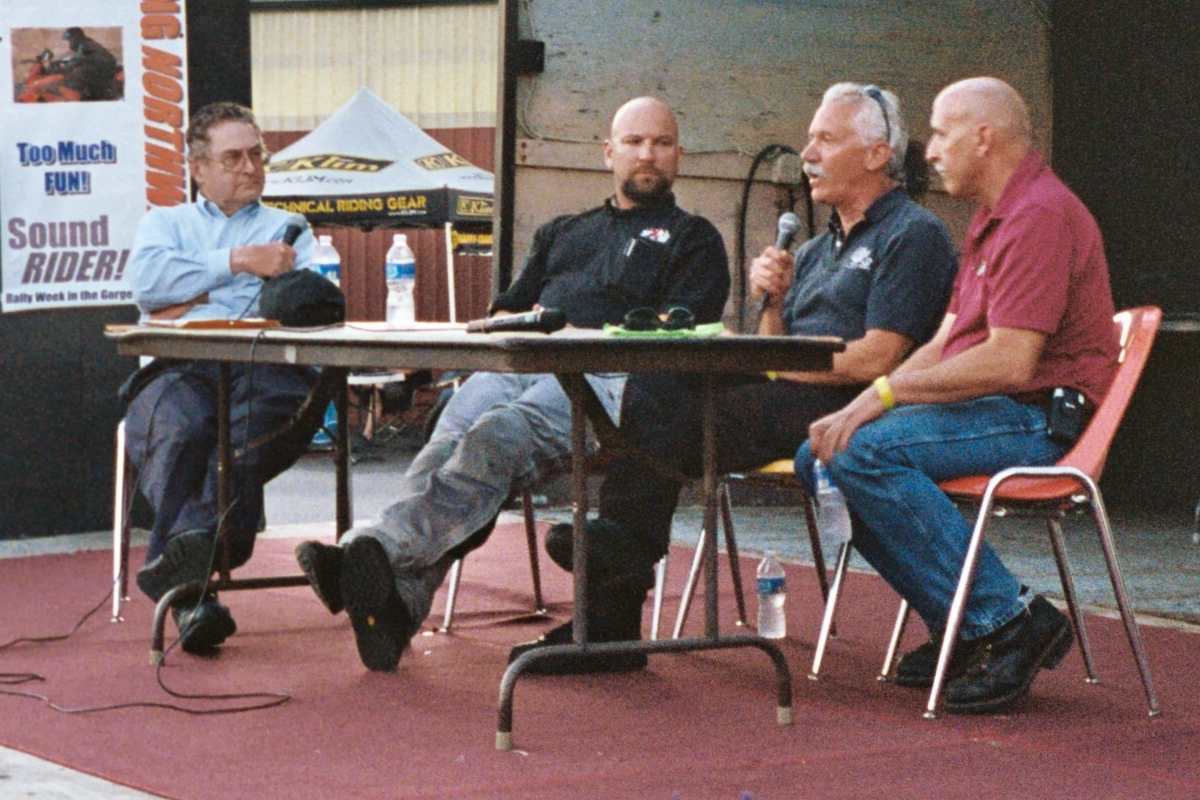
Motorcycle safety panel discussion with David L. Hough at Sportbike Northwest 2011.

In 2001 the magazine entered into the area of event promotion putting on the Northwest Motorcycle Display at the Cycle World International Motorcycle Show held in Seattle. In 2002 the magazine hosted the first ever 3 Pass Blast ride taking riders on a time/speed/distance ride through the Cascades Range. The event is held annually.

2003 marked the birth of the Sound RIDER! Sportbike Northwest motorcycle rally (SBNW). It eventually blossomed into three more rally events: Sport Touring Northwest, Dualsport Northwest and Maxi Scooter Northwest. All four events are held simultaneously each summer in the Columbia River Gorge over a five-day period and are sanctioned as the Northwest Regional Rally for the American Motorcyclist Association. SBNW participants can ride on the private Maryhill Loops Road.

During 2006 Sound RIDER! began to offer tours beginning with the Trollhuagen Dual Sport Tour, which eventually was renamed the Sasquatch Dual Sport tour. In 2009 the first Road Trip tour was offered. Each tour takes riders through the Northwest along lesser travelled roads and in the case of the Sasquatch tour, riders are guided over many forest service dirt and gravel roads.

== Publications ==
The publisher of Sound Rider!, Mixed Media Publishing, is operated by Tom Mehren and has published several books by him and David L. Hough.

- Mehren, Tom (2007), Packing Light Packing Right!: The Sound RIDER! Guide to Motorcycle Packing, Mixed Media, ISBN 978-0-9747420-1-4
- Mehren, Tom (2008), Motorcycling in the Columbia River Gorge (3rd ed.), Mixed Media, ISBN 978-0-9747420-5-2
- Mehren, Tom (2009), Dual Sport Rides through Western Washington (1st ed.), Mixed Media, ISBN 978-0-9747420-6-9
- Mehren, Tom (2010), Motorcycling through Central & Eastern Oregon (1st ed.), Mixed Media, ISBN 978-0-9747420-7-6
- Mehren, Tom (2012), Motorcycling Through Western Oregon (1st ed.), Mixed Media, ISBN 978-0-9747420-8-3
- Mehren, Tom (2013), Motorcycling Through Western Washington (1st ed.), Mixed Media, ISBN 978-0-9747420-9-0
- Hough, David L. (2013), The Good Rider, USA: Mixed Media, ISBN 978-0-9747420-3-8

The online food and drink magazine Seattle DINING! has been published by Mixed Media Publishing since 1999.
