= Wire strainer =

A wire strainer or wire stretcher is a device for putting tension on fencing wire to remove slack in the wires.

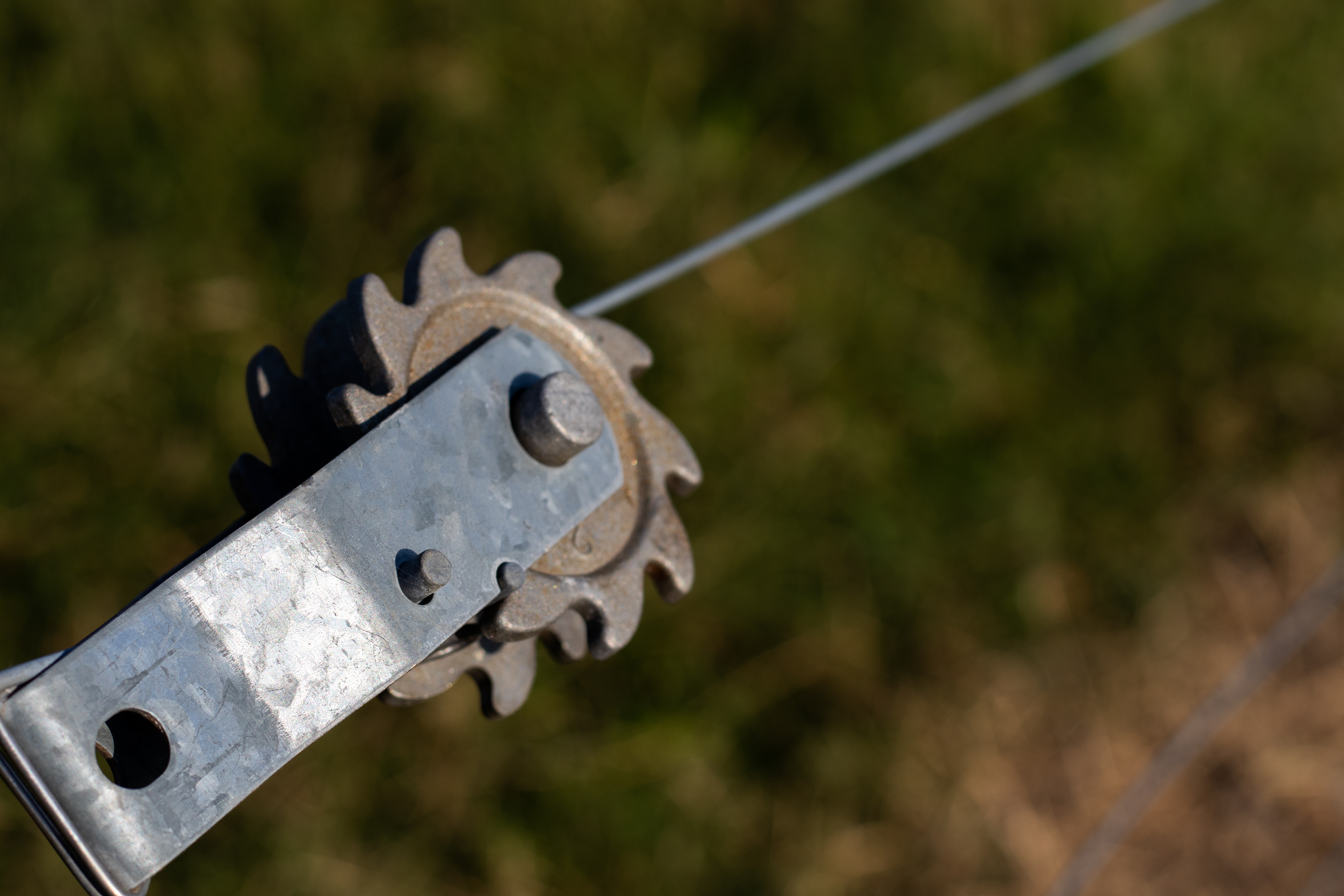
Permanent rachet-type fence wire strainer

Wire strainers can either be permanently installed on the fence or a reusable tool. Fencing wire was first used extensively in the early nineteenth century but not common until the 1850s. Initially heavy gauge iron wire could be rigid, but lighter gauge and more modern steel wires required tensioning to prevent them sagging or separating when livestock tries getting through.

== Strainer tools ==
Ernest Hayes, an engineer and inventor based in Oturehua, New Zealand, developed a chain grab wire strainer tool with two clamps to hold the wires. The tension is applied by alternately moving the jaws of the mechanism along the chain. Once the wires are sufficiently strained they are looped together and tied. Hayes began development of the strainer tool in 1905 and refined it in five versions until the final version in 1924. The Hayes strainer became well known in the farming community, and was exported to 30 countries. In 1981, the New Zealand Industrial Design Council recognised the smooth grip chain wire strainer with a Designmark award. As of 2025, the Hayes smooth grip chain strainer is still in production.
