= Portland Alley Sweeper =

Motorcycle rally in Oregon

- 2012 Alley Sweeper Urban Enduro poster
- Frequency: Annually
- Location: Portland, Oregon
- Country: United States
- Inaugurated: 2009
- Founder: Zac Christensen
- Most recent: April 13, 2024
- Next event: April, 2025
- Participants: c. 300
- Major events: Motorcycle rally
- Patron: Sang Froid Riding Club
- Website: sang-froidridingclub.com

The Portland Alley Sweeper, also called the Alley Sweeper Urban Enduro, is a motorcycle rally in the city alleys of Portland, Oregon. Begun in 2009 by Zac Christensen of the Sang Froid Riding Club motorcycle club in Portland, the rally has been described as "a cross-city tour of Portland’s mangled side streets by way of whatever two-wheeled contraption you can hobble together", drawing around 300 riders a year.

Event organizers say by riding street legal two-wheeled vehicles in the city's alleys, they are merely exercising their rights on a public right of way and said that it is "not a race but a parade". Opponents say they are concerned about child safety and some even say they are "hostage in their own yard" for the duration of the hours-long rally. One resident said that the mostly small-displacement dual-sport motorcycles and scooters (Note: "[T]he day belongs to tiny bikes. As if drawn by an international homing beacon, a huge number of 90 cc lay-down cylinder Honda/China Lifan bikes inevitably appear.") "sound like tanks".

Portland police have said the rally riders are permitted in the alleys if they are obeying the 15-mile-per-hour (24 km/h) speed limit, and other traffic laws.

== See also ==
- Culture of Portland, Oregon
