= Rally of Discovery =

The Rally of Discovery is a motorcycle rally held in the Republic of Ireland and other locales. It was started in 1994 by the Southern Motorcycle Adventure Club.

The Purpose of the Rally of Discovery is to keep in contact with the riders who take part, or have an interest in these international motorcycle adventure and navigation rallies i.e. to use motorcycles, normally trail motorcycles to explore your local area.

The first Rally started in Cork outside Isaacs Hostel, where most of the entrants stayed the night before. In the following years the event has started in different locations and latterly it has moved overseas from Ireland to keep the adventure fresh.

== Locations ==
- 1994 - Cork City Ireland
- 1995 - Ireland
- 1996 - Ireland
- 1997 - Ireland
- 1998 - Ireland
- 1999 - Ireland
- 2000 - Ireland
- 2001 - Crete - Rally of Discovery - Island of Crete
- 2002 - Clare Navigation Rallye Republuc of Ireland
- 2003 - Trip to Tipp - Rally of Discovery - Clonmel Ireland
- 2004 - Welsh Rally of Discovery - Wales
- 2004 - Andalucia Adventure - Rally of Discovery - South of Spain
- 2005 - Wales - Rally of Discovery - Wales
- 2006 - Cyprus - Rally of Discovery Cyprus paphos
- 2006 - Cornwall - Rally of Discovery Cornwall
- 2007 - Yorkshire - Forest Moor & Coast, Yorkshire Rally of Discovery
- 2007 - Isle of Man - Manx Rally of Discovery
- 2008 - Surrey Hills - Rally of Discovery UK 3/5 May 2008
- 2008 - Ireland - Lisdoonvarna Rally of Discovery 05 - 08 Sept 2008
