= US Fleet Tracking =

U.S. GPS tracker manufacturer

- Type: Private
- Industry: Internet
- Founded: 2005
- Founder: Jerry Hunter
- Headquarters: Edmond, OK, United States
- Area served: Worldwide
- Key people: Jerry Hunter, Founder/CEO
- Website: www.usfleettracking.com

US Fleet Tracking is a privately owned company that specializes in manufacturing and distributing GPS Tracking products and accessories designed to enable businesses and individuals to monitor their mobile assets and vehicle fleets, tracking those vehicles live, in realtime, as they move.

== Business ==
The company manufactures a variety of GPS (Global Positioning System) trackers intended for use in vehicles and other mobile assets. It also offers an Internet-based subscription service that gives clients access to 5- or 10-second updates around the clock from each installed GPS tracker. The system collects and stores data from each unit on a 24/7 basis, and can generate reports showing the activity of each vehicle during a specified time frame. The system can be configured to transmit alerts to the account owner if certain user-defined conditions are detected, such as a monitored vehicle exceeding acceptable speeds or entering/exiting a specific area.

== History ==
During his employment as IT Director at Metropolitan EMS (MEMS) in Little Rock, Arkansas (1997-1998), Jerry Hunter began working with 911 Emergency Dispatch systems and tablet-based data acquisition systems. His subsequent contract with Little Rock Police Department resulted in his development of 911 Emergency Dispatch system there, as well as in-car mobile data terminals with live GPS tracking, live camera system, messaging, and NCIC gateway and client products. These systems communicated primarily through proprietary dataradio systems from Motorola and Kenwood. Hunter founded predecessor company Pinnacle Labs Corp. in Arkansas in 2001, marketing his dispatch and in-car police systems throughout the US. This experience was critical in creating the foundation on which US Fleet Tracking's live tracking technology was built.

With the advent of Google Maps and the proliferation of wireless data services from Sprint and AT&T, Hunter founded US Fleet Tracking in 2005. Google Maps provided the ability to convert the dispatch platform into a web-based application without the need for specialized local maps and aerial imagery, and the proliferation of wireless data services eliminated the need for expensive private data radio towers. Relocating to Oklahoma City in 2006, Hunter brought this GPS tracking technology to the general marketplace, with the aim of providing affordable LIVE GPS tracking technology to mobile workforce businesses as well as private individuals.

In 2007, US Fleet Tracking provided live GPS tracking to Gameday Management Group for use at the Super Bowl, tracking AFC and NFC Team buses, media buses, press buses, halftime entertainers, team owners and team family limousines, and other critical assets. US Fleet Tracking continues to provide these services for the Super Bowl each year, as it has each year since 2007 (through 2020). In 2013, US Fleet Tracking sponsored the FLS Microjet for its appearance at the EAA AirVenture Oshkosh airshow in Oshkosh, Wisconsin. The company demonstrated its live tracking technology at the event by installing its proprietary GPS equipment on the FLS Microjet and allowing the public to follow the course of the aircraft via a website in real time during the exhibition.

== Partnerships ==
In 2013 US Fleet Tracking announced the formation of a strategic partnership with AgTrax Technologies, developers of accounting software programs for agri-businesses. The partnership resulted in the integration of AgTrax’s software with US Fleet Tracking’s TotalView system to create an enhanced GPS tracking system that enables real-time monitoring of mobile agricultural equipment.

In 2016 US Fleet Tracking established a partnership with Gorilla Safety, a Houston-based company specializing in software for the transportation sector, to create a fully integrated system that combines live GPS tracking with electronic logging features compliant with the Electronic Logging Device (ELD) mandate of the Federal Motor Carrier Safety Administration (FMCSA).

== Clients ==
US Fleet Tracking’s live GPS services have been used by organizers and logistics managers for countless high-profile events, including every Super Bowl (XLI through LIV) since 2007, the 2010 Winter Olympics, the 2010 Pro Bowl, the 2011 NHL All-Star Game, the 2012 Summer Olympics, the 2012 Republican National Convention, and the 2011 & 2012 Hoka Hey Motorcycle Challenge.

== Awards and recognition ==
US Fleet Tracking has received the following honors:

• Silver, 2007 M2M Value Chain Awards, Enabler – M2M Magazine
• Bronze, 2008 M2M Value Chain Awards, Enabler – M2M Magazine
• 2010 Innovator of the Year – The Journal Record
• 2012 Rock Solid Award, Mobile Office – ProPickup
