= Wendy Crockett =

American long distance motorcycle rider

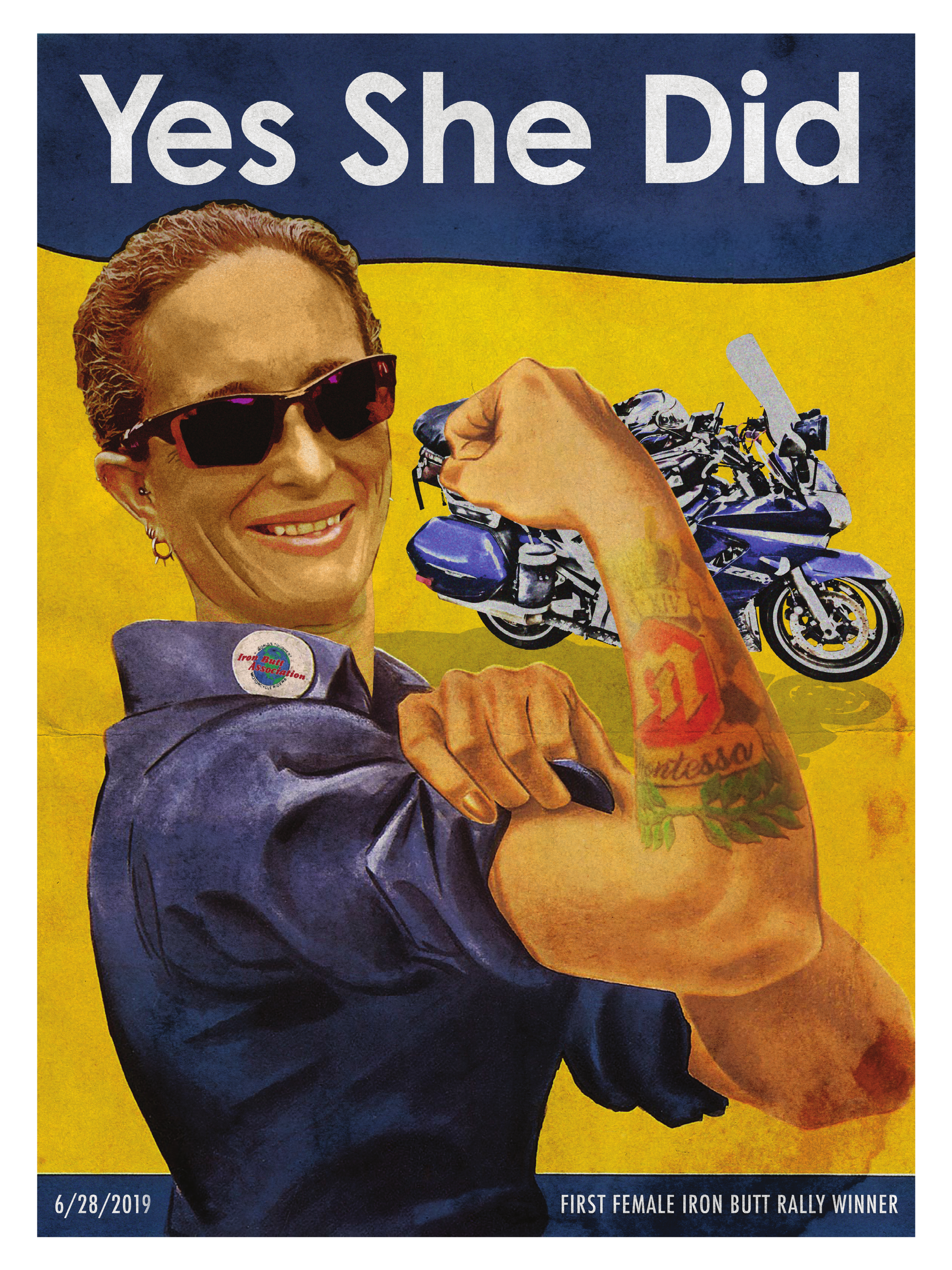
Poster celebrating Crockett's Iron Butt Rally win

Wendy Crockett is an American long-distance motorcycle rider. In 2019, she achieved a historic milestone by becoming the first woman to win the Iron Butt Rally, an 11-day, 11,000-mile motorcycle endurance event often referred to as "The World's Toughest Motorcycle Competition."

In 2022, together with her riding partner Ian McPhee, Crockett earned a Guinness World Record for the longest motorcycle journey in a single country as a team, becoming the first ever to achieve this record.

In 2026, together with her riding partner Liza Miller, Crockett earned an Atlas World Record for the Largest GPS Drawing by a Motorcycle Pair.

== Riding ==
=== Early history ===
Crockett first began riding motorcycles at the age of 18 and soon realized she had a knack for long-distance endurance riding. In 2004, she earned her first two Iron Butt Association certificates on a solo trip from Pismo Beach, California, to Savannah, Georgia. During this ride, she successfully documented both a 1,243-mile Saddlesore (a minimum of 1,000 miles in under 24 hours) and a 50cc (coast-to-coast in the United States in under 50 hours) on a 2001 Yamaha FZ1 motorcycle. She went on to earn three additional Iron Butt Certifications: a Border to Border Gold (Canada to Mexico in under 24 hours), a Bun Burner Gold (a minimum of 1,500 miles in under 24 hours), and a Saddlesore 2000 Gold (over 2,000 miles in under 36 hours) on a 2005 Yamaha FJR before applying for a position in the 2009 Iron Butt Rally.

=== Competitive career ===
Crockett's first competitive endurance riding event was the 2009 Iron Butt Rally, in which she finished in 26th place. She went on to compete in 14 more long-distance endurance rallies over the following ten years, ranging in duration from 24 hours to 11 days, garnering one win and four podium finishes along the way. The 2019 Iron Butt Rally marked her fifth running of the event, during which she succeeded in becoming the first woman to win in the event's 35-year history.

To date, she has started and completed a total of six Iron Butt Rallies, more than any other female competitor. She is one of only nine people in the world to have successfully completed "The World's Toughest Motorcycle Rally" six or more times; only four people have more than six finishes. All of Crockett's competitive rallying through 2023 utilized the same 2005 Yamaha FJR motorcycle; that motorcycle has completed more Iron Butt Rallies than any other single vehicle, and is currently on display at the AMA Motorcycle Museum and Hall of Fame. In addition to her historic win, Crockett has taken Iron Butt Rally trophies for 3rd place (2013), 6th place (2021), and 7th place (2017). As of 2023, she is named four times in the Top 100 "Highest Number of Miles Ridden on an Iron Butt Rally", with three of those positions being in the Top 25. Her highest mileage finish ranks sixth overall, reflecting the 13,510 miles she rode in 11 days during the 2021 Iron Butt Rally. In total, she had covered 73,791 miles while riding in Iron Butt Rallies, the fifth-highest total of any competitor in the event's history and the only woman to have earned a spot on the list.

To date, Crockett has competed in 20 long-distance endurance rallies, covering a combined total of 117,262 miles. She has also earned 28 Iron Butt Association ride certificates in the United States, Canada, Mexico, and Australia on motorcycles ranging from 150cc to 1300cc, reflecting a combined total of 345,175 miles (although some of these certificate miles reflect overlapping, or "nested" rides).

=== Record-setting long-distance ride ===
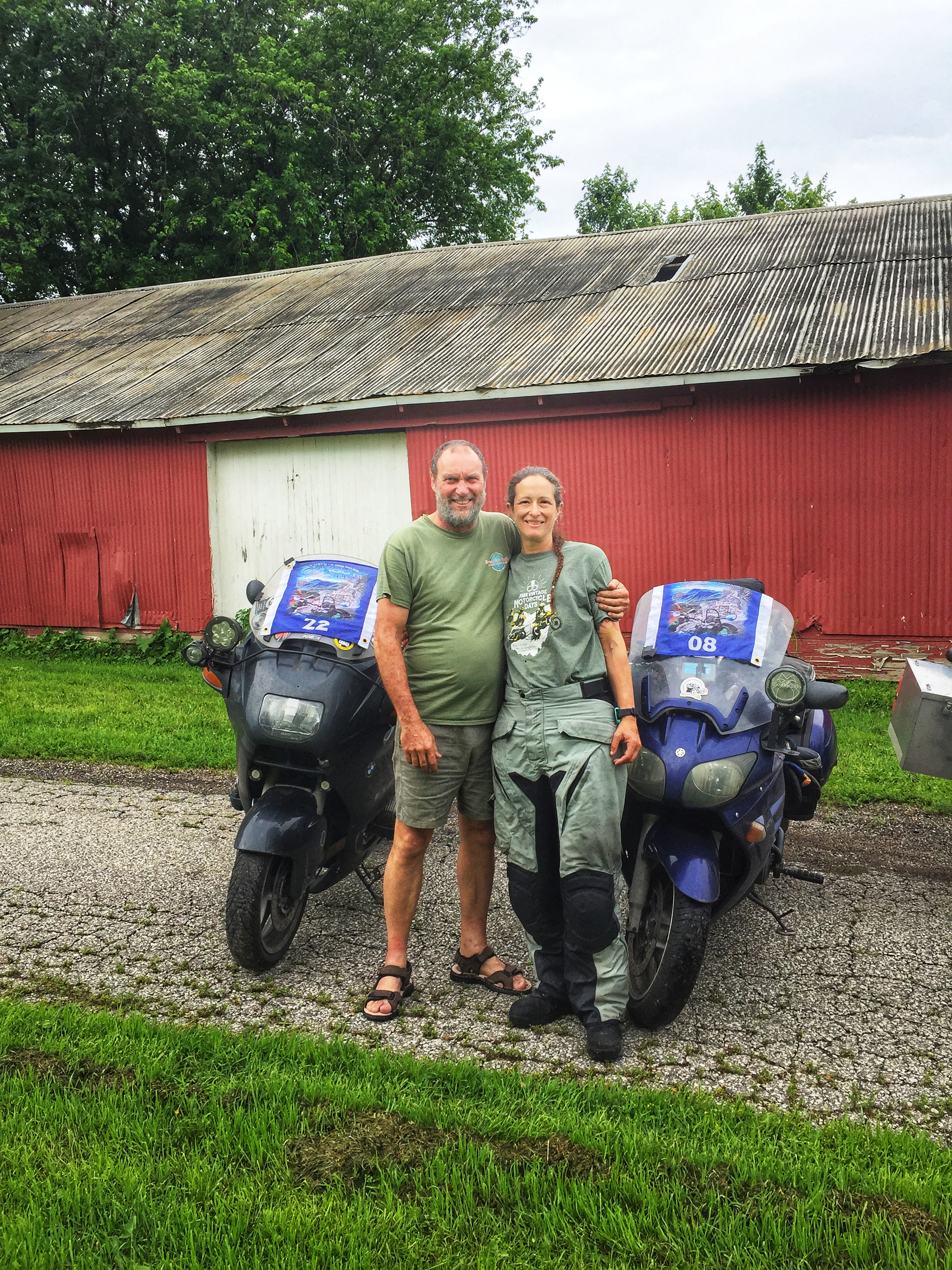
Crockett and McPhee part ways following the 2019 Iron Butt Rally

In April 2022, Crockett teamed up with Ian McPhee in his home country of Australia to complete an SS8000K certificate ride, during which they successfully documented a total of 8,439 km in under five days on two separate motorcycles. With Crockett riding a 2001 Yamaha FJR and McPhee on a 2012 Yamaha XT1200Z Super Tenere, this undertaking marked the first occasion that the pair had ridden together as a team. They first shared the road for a short time as adversaries during the 2019 Iron Butt Rally but discovered that they were compatible traveling companions, despite the solitary nature of the sport.

Planning had been underway since late 2019 for what would become their Guinness World Record-setting ride, but the global COVID-19 pandemic prevented McPhee from traveling internationally in preparation for the undertaking. It was nearly three years before they were able to reunite, only five weeks after Australia fully reopened its borders to international travel, and just six weeks before their world record attempt was scheduled to begin in the United States. Although Crockett and McPhee reported that the Australian ride was unusually trying due to historic bad weather, animal strikes, and mechanical difficulties, the pair found that they functioned well as a team and decided that they would move forward with the World Record attempt in North America in spite of the difficulties.

With Crockett riding a 2005 Yamaha FJR and McPhee riding a 2000 BMW R1100RT, and with material support from MCCruise motorcycle cruise controls and Innovv dashcams, the record attempt was set to begin in Montgomery, Alabama, USA, on May 20, 2022. Their planned route had them visiting 49 US states plus Washington, D.C., in alphabetical order, photographing every state capitol building along the way. Unfortunately, Crockett suffered a medical emergency on May 17, which required immediate surgery and hospitalization. With the clock already ticking on McPhee's American tourist visa, the decision was made that he would begin the alphabetical ride on his own, visiting the Alabama capitol in Montgomery and the Alaska capital in Juneau before reuniting with Crockett on May 28 in Craigellachie, British Columbia, Canada. Only those miles ridden side-by-side as a team within the United States counted towards their record goals, so after a nine-day delay, the pair was able to officially mark the start of their Guinness World Record ride attempt in Oroville, Washington State, USA, on May 29, 2022.

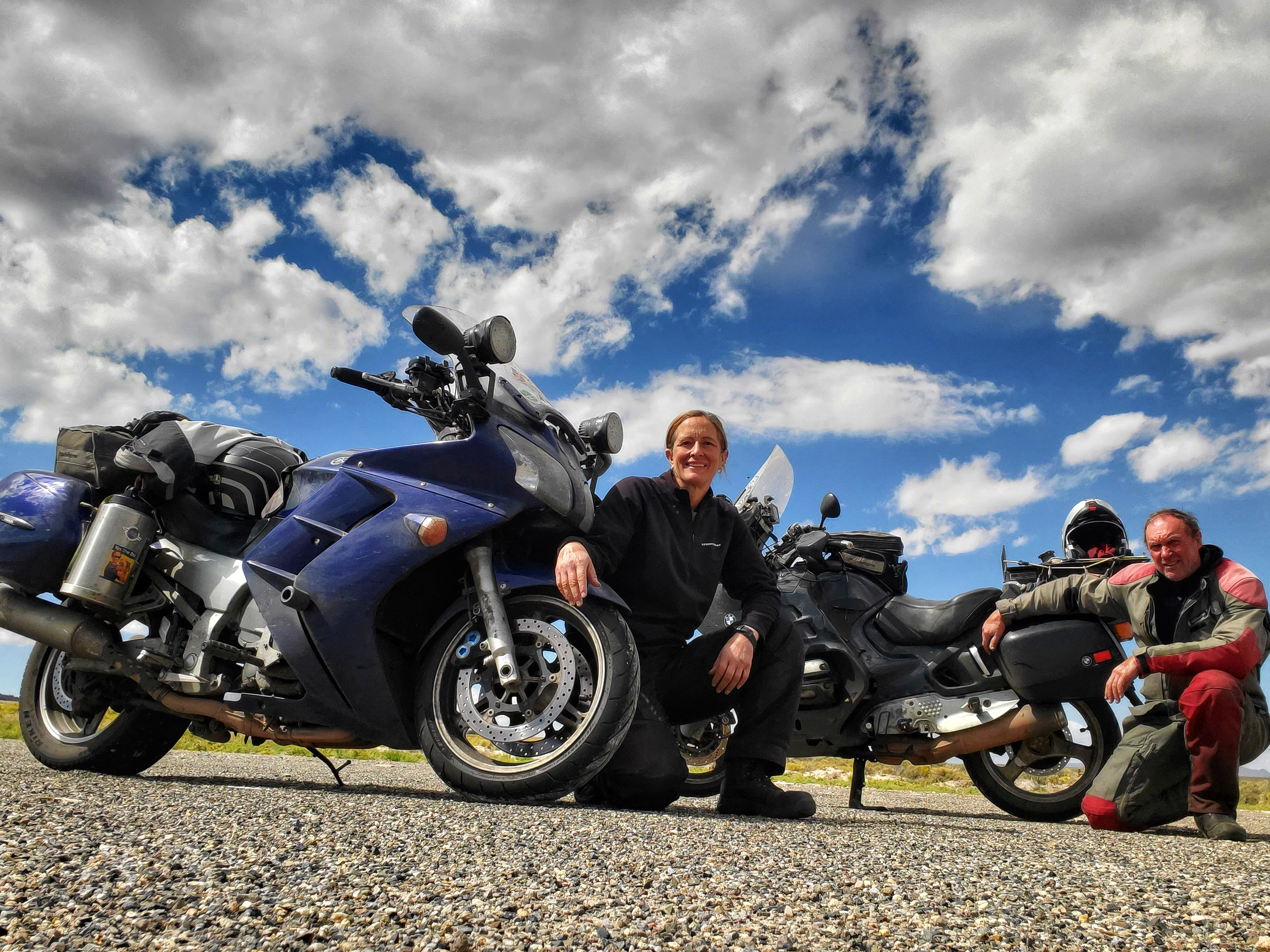
Crockett and McPhee in the Nevada desert just after reaching their minimum required Guinness mileage.

To fulfill Guinness' stringent documentation requirements, Crockett tracked her progress using a Delorme InReach tracker, and McPhee tracked his progress using a SPOT tracker. The planned ride had the team covering 83,000 miles in 80 days, but following their delayed start they continued to be plagued by historic bad weather, animal strikes, illness, a second hospitalization, and various mechanical delays. They ultimately lost 52 riding days to myriad troubles. They documented their final alphabetical state in the Wyoming capital city of Cheyenne on August 14, 2022, 77 days and 63,474 miles into their Guinness record attempt. Including Washington, D.C., this location marked the 49th capitol for Crockett and the 50th capitol for McPhee, making them the first riders to earn the Iron Butt Association's Alphabetical Capital Expedition and Alphabetical Capital Expedition Plus certificates, respectively.

With nearly 17,000 additional miles required in order for the duo to claim the world record, they pushed on for several more weeks before ultimately concluding their ride on September 25, 2022, in Odell, Illinois, 119 days after the ride began and a full 39 days behind schedule. After a lengthy review process, they were able to successfully claim a new world record, with Guinness recognizing their total qualifying distance at 80,208 miles (129,082 km). Their total shared miles across Australia, Canada, and the United States totaled 97,319 miles (156,620 km) in just under six months.

Their 2024 autobiography, Pushing Miles, chronicles their entire journey.

=== Record-setting GPS drawing ride ===
In 2026, Crockett and Liza Miller, co-CEO of Women Riders World Relay (WRWR), set the world record for the largest coordinated GPS drawing by a motorcycle pair, riding a route across the continental United States that spelled out "WRWR 2026." The two departed Olympia, Washington, on June 29, 2026, covering 13,548 miles during the course of the drawing, at a pace of roughly 600 miles per day. In keeping with WRWR's mission to "Connect, Challenge, Change," Crockett and Miller invited riders to join them for portions of the route. Seventeen riders, both women and men, accepted the challenge; some rode for a single day and others for nearly the entire route, most taking on more daily mileage than they had ever previously attempted. The group drew coverage from local newspapers and television stations as it crossed the country.

The completed route was independently adjudicated by Atlas World Records, which confirmed an official measurement of 13,204 miles, excluding the distance ridden between each character in the drawing. The distance and integrity of the drawing was verified through synchronized tracking data collected over the 24-day ride from June 29 to July 23, 2026. The track was recorded by a Delorme inReach carried by Crockett, and a Garmin Messenger carried by Miller, with the data aggregated into the complete route map by Spotwalla. An Atlas World Record adjudicator was on location at the American Motorcyclist Association's 2026 Vintage Motorcycle Days event to announce Crockett and Miller as the official record holders for the largest coordinated GPS drawing by a motorcycle pair.

The duo's ride concludes with an appearance at Pearl's Jam, the annual women's event at the Sturgis Motorcycle Museum and Hall of Fame, alongside the 86th Sturgis Motorcycle Rally.

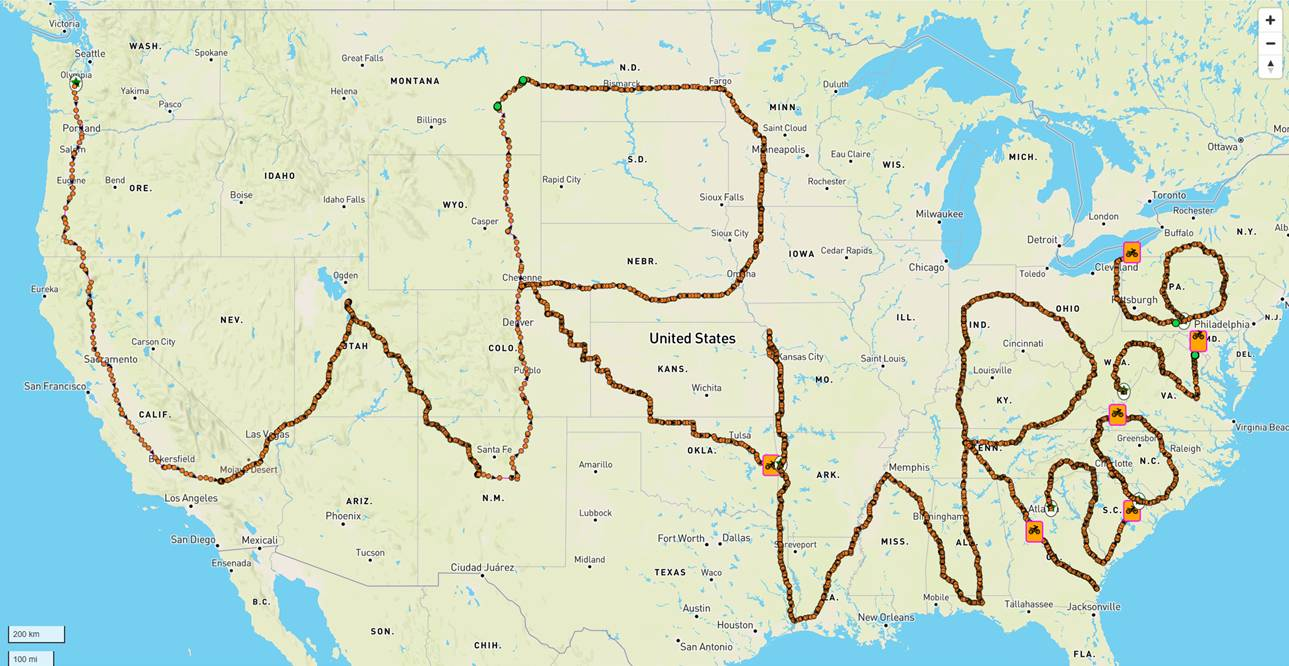

== Professional life ==
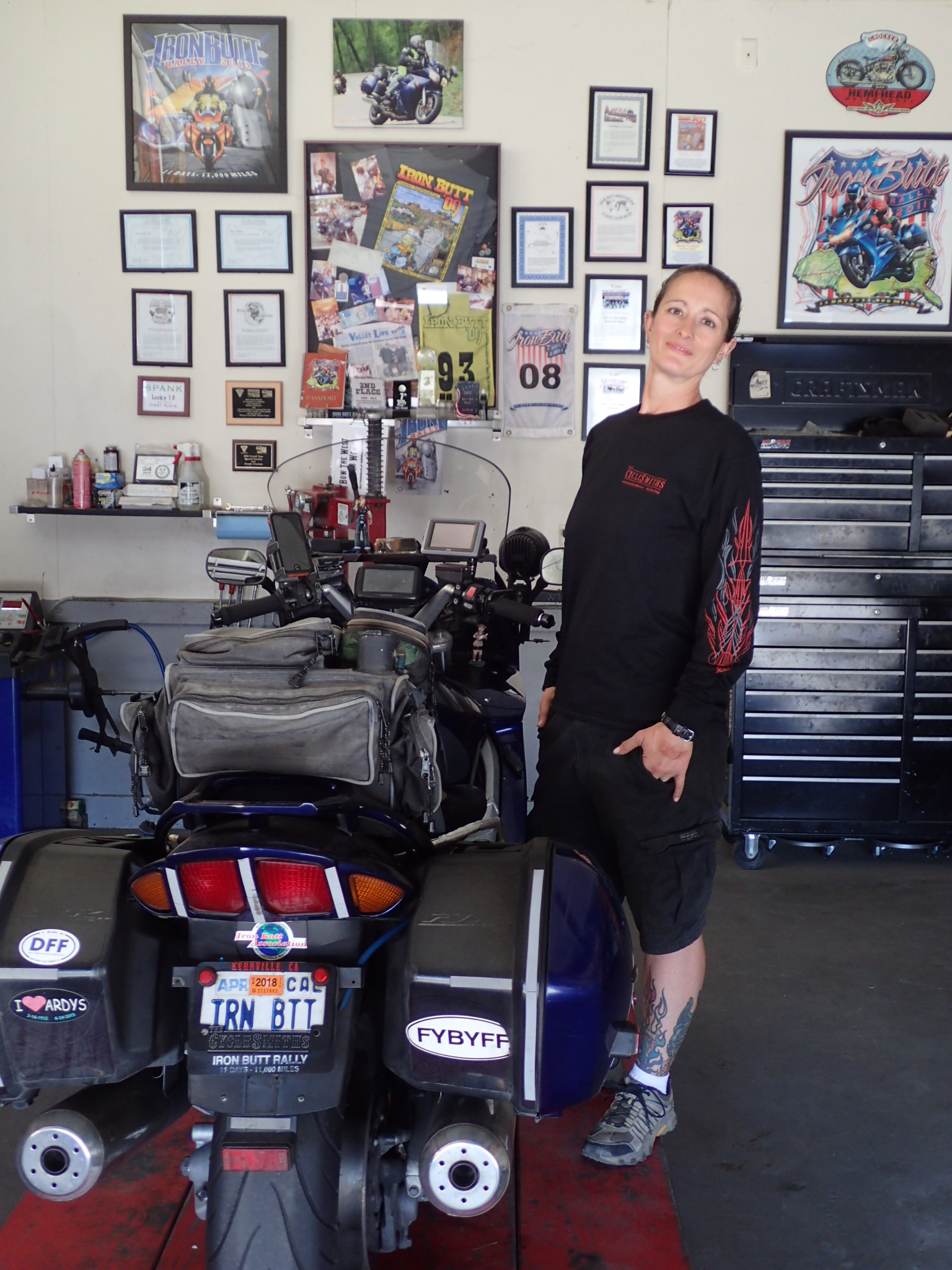
Crockett in her Kernville, California (USA) motorcycle shop

Crockett is a multiple factory-certified motorcycle mechanic, having graduated from the Motorcycle Mechanics Institute in 2001. She owned a motorcycle shop in California for 14 years before relocating to South Dakota. Her writing and photography have appeared in several magazines, including RoadRunner, Sidkar, Sidecar Traveler, as well as the book "Ride/Write, 2nd Edition". Her photography can also be found on the back cover of "The Women's Guide to Motorcycling" by Lynda Lahman and the front cover of the December 2020 Sidkar Magazine. She has appeared in three movies: "Hard Miles 2", "Like a Woman" and "Women in the Front Seat". She currently works as a motorcycle ride instructor and travels the world as a motorcycle tour guide; she also conducts workshops on topics such as motorcycle travel and mechanics and speaks about her accomplishments at motorcycle and non-motorcycle-related events.

== Personal life ==
Crockett is married with one child. Her record-setting 2005 Yamaha FJR was part of a matching set gifted to her by her now-husband when he proposed to her in 2004. Her husband is not a long-distance motorcycle competitor himself, but Crockett says he is her "biggest cheerleader".

== Awards ==
In 2019, Crockett was named a Paul Harris Fellow by the Rotary International in appreciation of the tangible and significant assistance given for the furtherance of better understanding and friendly relations among peoples around the world.

In 2020, she was awarded the American Motorcyclist Association's Bessie Stringfield Award, recognizing individuals who have worked to introduce motorcycling to emerging markets.

In July 2020, she was awarded a Not Right Rider Award for completing a Saddlesore (1,610 km in under 24 hours) on a motorcycle under 300cc in displacement; she completed the ride in Mexico on a 150cc Zontes U150 motorcycle.

In September 2020, she was awarded a Daredevil Award for completing a Saddlesore totaling 1,809 km on a motorcycle under 500cc in displacement; she completed the ride in Mexico on a 310cc Zontes T2-310 motorcycle.

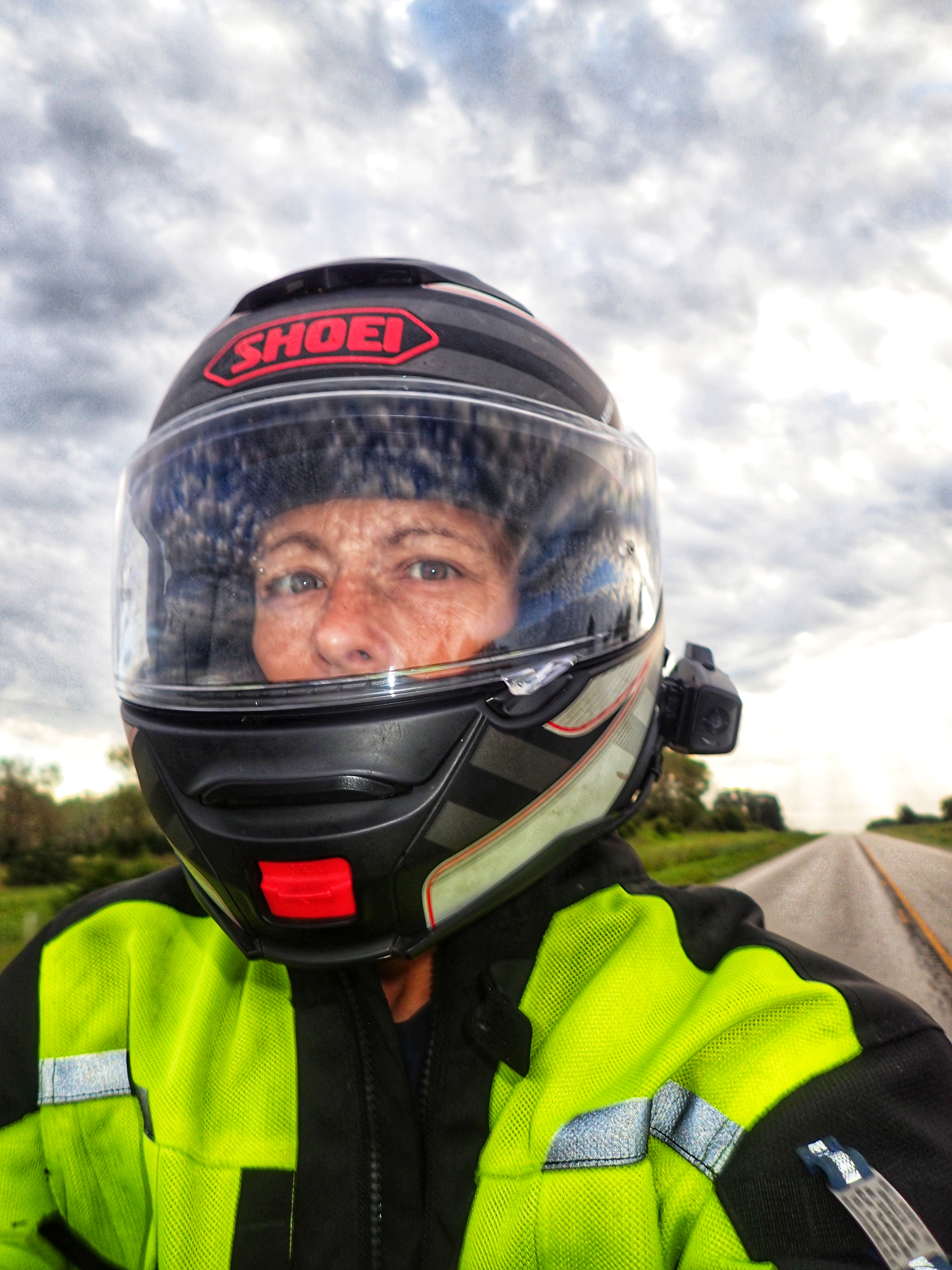
Crockett on the open road

Also in September 2020, she was awarded a Pioneer Award from Iron Butt Association Mexico and Asphalt Rats in recognition of being the first woman to document a Saddlesore while piloting a sidecar rig. Her rig is powered by a 2001 Suzuki Bandit 1200.

In October 2021, she earned the American Motorcyclist Association's Service Award for her volunteer work on the Suffragists Centennial Motorcycle Ride, an event celebrating the 100th anniversary of the passage of the 19th amendment which made women in the United States eligible to vote for the first time.

In December 2022, Crockett, together with Ian McPhee, received the World Traveler Award in the Team Strange Trails to Rails Grand Tour event for documenting bonus locations in three countries. This included all three available transcontinental railroad bonuses, which required visits to Last Spike monuments in Australia, Canada, and the United States.

In 2023, she was recognized by the Iron Butt Association as a member of the 100k Club, achieved by documenting more than 100,000 miles of riding in a single calendar year.

In 2026, Crockett was presented with the Women Riders World Relay Challenge Coin, which is awarded to women who have made outstanding achievements and advancements on behalf of women motorcyclists.

== Publications ==
- Pushing Miles: A chronicle of Motorcycles, Mayhem, and Mettle, Autobiography, 2024, ISBN 979-8-9889893-1-8, 979-8-9889893-0-1
