= David L. Hough =

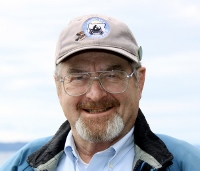
- Occupation: Journalist
- Writing career
- Genre: Nonfiction
- Subject: Motorcycle safety
- Notable works: Proficient Motorcycling, More Proficient Motorcycling
- Notable awards: Motorcycle Safety Foundation’s Excellence in Motorcycle Journalism award (2x), AMA Motorcycle Hall of Fame

David L. Hough (born 1937) is an American writer on motorcycle rider safety, education and training. He has been a columnist for Motorcycle Consumer News, Sound RIDER! and BMW Owners News magazines. After his first book Proficient Motorcycling was published by Bow Tie Press it became one of the best selling motorcycle books. He currently has four published books and one 2nd ed. He has been recognized twice as a writer by the Motorcycle Safety Foundation's (MSF) Excellence in Motorcycle Journalism award.

== Career ==
He has also designed a rider skills course for sidecar riders. Hough has been called "a premier motorcycling journalist" and the author of "one of the most widely respected books on safe street riding." In the media he is frequently called upon to provide expert commentary on motorcycling issues, and his work is on the recommended reading lists of many other motorcycling writers.

Hough was inducted to the AMA Motorcycle Hall of Fame in December 2009 for his work as a motorcycle journalist and riding safety books that "should be a mandatory read for every motorcyclist, from novice to expert."

== Bibliography ==
- Hough, David (2000), Proficient Motorcycling: The Ultimate Guide to Riding Well, USA: BowTie Press, ISBN 1-889540-53-6 (2008 2nd ed. ISBN 978-1-933958-35-4)
- Hough, David (2001), Street Strategies: A Survival Guide for Motorcyclists, USA: BowTie Press, ISBN 1-889540-69-2
- Hough, David (2003), More Proficient Motorcycling: Mastering the Ride, USA: BowTie Press, ISBN 1-931993-03-3
- Hough, David (2013), The Good Rider, USA: Mixed Media, ISBN 978-0-9747420-3-8

== List of reading recommendations ==
Motorcycling recommended reading lists that include David Hough's books.

- "Parade Lap", American Motorcyclist, vol. 33, no. 10, American Motorcyclist Association, p. 13, November 1979, ISSN 0277-9358, "Hough's stuff — We continue to be impressed with the efforts of AMA biker David Hough, whose most recent project is a safe riding newsletter for the Boeing (as in airplane) Employees Motorcycle Club in Seattle. Hough deals succinctly with the gut issues of motorcycle safety. For example, 'If panic braking practice scares you, it's probably just what you need.' Well said, David."
- Bishop, Randy (2008-02-12), Randy Bishop's Iron Butt Association SaddleSore 2000, May 29–30, 2004, archived from the original on 2011-03-14, "As soon as I did that I remembered David Hough's admonitions in MCN about "edge traps" and knew I was stuck in the right lane for the length of the repaving project."
- Coyner, Dale (2007), The Essential Guide to Motorcycle Travel: Tips, Technology, Advanced Techniques, Kogan Page Publishers, p. 172, ISBN 978-1-884313-59-2, "I also like Proficient Motorcycling, by David Hough, as a follow-up on responsible, safe riding because Hough's lessons are delivered in a patient, even tone using simple but vivid descriptions of common situations and hazards we face."
- DelVecchio, Jon (2018), Cornering Confidence: The Formula for 100% Control in Curves, Street Skills LLC, p. 4, ISBN 978-0692087329, "Cornering Confidence is a mix of techniques promoted by Keith Code, David Hough, Nick Ienatsch, Lee Parks and Reg Pridmore."
- Duglin Kennedy, Shirley (2005-11-01), The Savvy Guide to Motorcycles, Indy Tech Publishing, ISBN 0-7906-1316-6, "2005"
- Dulyanai, Mark (2008-07-11), "Have You Read?: Motorcycle guides coming your way from the library", Tahoe Daily Tribune, archived from the original on 2011-09-28, ""Proficient Motorcycling" is very much geared to the average rider. David Hough is well-known in the motorcycling community as a premier motorcycle journalist, with many decades of street riding under his belt. "Proficient Motorcycling" deals with the dangerous scenarios that many deal with in their daily commute. Hough provides real strategies for staying alive on the street, and I strongly suggest that all riders read his book."
- Hahn, Pat (2004), Ride Hard, Ride Smart: Ultimate Street Strategies for Advanced Motorcyclists, MotorBooks/MBI Publishing Company, p. 72, ISBN 0-7603-1760-7, "David Hough, a very proficient motorcyclist, also suggests a solution: match your brain speed to the road speed, just like matching your motorcycle's."
- Hahn, Pat; Brasfield, Evans (2005), How to ride a motorcycle: a rider's guide to strategy, safety, and skill development, MotorBooks/MBI Publishing Company, p. 103, ISBN 0-7603-2114-0, "Recommended Reading: Proficient Motorcycling by David Hough — Probably the best, most comprehensive motorcycle safety and technique book written."
- Heller, Jean (2005-06-13), Easy, older rider: deaths of over-40 motorcyclists grow: A graying pastime's downside is a growing roster of older riders killed - a 100 percent hike for the last five years of state statistics., St. Petersburg, FL: St. Petersburg Times, "David Hough, author of two books on proficient motorcycling, says older bikers sometimes outsmart themselves."
- Holmstrom, Darwin (2001), The Complete Idiot's Guide to Motorcycles (2nd ed.), Alpha Books, p. xxiii, ISBN 0-02-864258-9, "I'd like to give special thanks to journalists who wrote about safety issues, writers like David Hough and Lawrence Grodsky. Not only have they helped me learn what I needed to know to write this book, but they may have saved my life a time or two."
- Parks, Lee (2003-07-12), Total control: high performance street riding techniques, MotorBooks/MBI Publishing Company, p. 153, ISBN 0-7603-1403-9, "Recommended Reading Smart riders treat their sport as both a hobby and an intellectual pursuit. My recommended reading list will get you up to speed on most facets of performance riding and tuning. Proficient Motorcycling by David Hough. Lots of useful riding info and strategies for staying safe on the street."
- Stermer, Bill (15 December 2004), "Riding by the book: speed reading that could enhance your riding skills.(Book Review)", Rider, "David L. Hough (pronounced "huff") approaches this book with a long list of credentials. He's not only a long-term rider and commuter, but also has written a monthly skills column for Motorcycle Consumer News and two previous books on proficient motorcycling"
- Stermer, Bill (2006-07-01), Streetbikes: Everything You Need to Know, MotorBooks/MBI Publishing Company, ISBN 0-7603-2362-3, "Also, there are many books on basic riding skills (including those by David Hough and Pat Halm, to name a couple) and performance riding (by Reg Pridmore, Nick Ienatsch, and Lee Parks). Any or several of these should be on your shelf, as well. Those gentlemen can tell you how to ride better on the street; I'll tell you about many other aspects of street riding."
