= Americade =

Motorcycle rallies in the United States

- Genre: Motorcycle rally
- Dates: First week in June
- Locations: Lake George village, New York, United States
- Founded: May 1983
- Founder: Bill Dutcher
- Most recent: June 7th-11th; 2022
- Next event: May 30th-June 4th; 2023
- Attendance: 60,000+ (2007)
- Website: americade.com

Americade is a week-long motorcycle rally that is held during the first full week of June. The headquarters and location of many rally activities are at Fort William Henry Resort in Lake George Village, New York. The event is open to all motorcyclists and brands of motorcycles, and in the late 1990s attracted around 50,000 people annually, which grew to over 60,000 by 2007. Americade is billed by its organizer as the "World's Largest Motorcycle Touring Rally", and is distinguished from events such as Daytona Bike Week by its emphasis on motorcycle touring and by its organization and peacefulness.

The event has drawn praise throughout its history in national motorcycle press as well as national non-motorcycle media, including in the New York Times ''Americade is doing more for the image of motorcyclists than any other event,'' the Associated Press “Americade is about as peaceful as a motorcycle rally can be. And it certainly is no Sturgis”

The founder, Bill Dutcher, is the recipient of the 1998 AMA MVP Award for "advancing the cause of motorcycling" and the 2003 AMA Hazle-Kolb Brighter Image Award for "the positive contributions that Americade has made to the motorcycling community," and "is the AMA’s highest honor for activities that generate favorable publicity for motorcycling." Dutcher is an American Motorcyclist Association 2022 Hall of Fame nominee.

Attendees participate in demo rides from most major manufacturers, boat cruises, motorcycle judging, group rides called "MiniTours" to various destinations in the Adirondack and Green Mountains of NY and VT.

Americade also offers a large motorcycle Expo located near the south end of Lake George, at the Festival Commons on Beach Road.

== History ==
May 1983 was the first "cade" in the east coast. Veteran motorcyclist Bill Dutcher, and a small staff, hosted "Aspencade East" in Lake George, NY. The event's headquarters were at Roaring Brook Ranch, from which most of the demo rides departed.

The TourExpo tradeshow was held at the Glens Falls Civic Center, approximately 10 miles (16 km) to the south. This first event drew over 2,000.

There was no Americade in 2020.

=== Original name ===
Since 1971, there had been an Aspencade touring motorcycle rally in Ruidoso, New Mexico. The name came from an annual civic festival, which celebrated the changing colors of the aspen (birch) trees. Dutcher arranged with Aspencade organizer Til Thompson to use the Aspencade name for the eastern touring rally, which started out as Aspencade East.

In 1986, "Aspencade East" became "Americade," because the new name better signified the multibrand national-sized rally it had become. By 1986, total attendance at this event was nearly 10,000. The name Americade was suggested by the organizer's wife, Gini Dutcher.

=== Growth ===
By 1986, the TourExpo tradeshow had been relocated to Lake George village, to keep it closer to the motels and riding activities. Initially located halfway down Beach Road in a large gravel parking lot, in 1994 TourExpo was relocated to the Million Dollar Beach Parking Lot, owned by the State of New York.

For many years, Americade has been named one of the American Motorcyclist Association's three national rallies (along with the Lone Star Rally in Texas and the Golden Aspen Rally in New Mexico).

== Staff and volunteers ==
Along with 5 full-time, year round employees, nearly 200 volunteers help staff the event during Americade Week. The volunteer staff assists with numerous hospitality, escort, and administration duties.

== Controversy ==
Between 2008 and 2014, New York State Police set up several "safety check points" on the major roads leading into the event, directing motorcycle traffic to police inspection points. All told there were approximately 200 citations issued, principally for documentation (registration, inspection), insurance, helmets and loud, custom exhaust systems.

New York ceased doing this in 2015.

Prior to the Americade event in 2010, the New York State Department of Environmental Conservation informed the organizers of Americade it would increase the rent it charged for the Million Dollar Beach parking lot from $52,000 to $90,312. This prompted the event organizers to examine other locations, including MA and VT. Community leaders in the Lake George area have expressed how important this event is to their economic survival.
