= Brass Monkey Motorcycle Rally =

Motorcycle competition in New Zealand

The Brass Monkey Motorcycle Rally was a rally held annually in Oturehua, Central Otago in New Zealand.

The event was held every year over the weekend on which the Queen's birthday is celebrated, usually the first weekend of June, from the early 1980s to 2021.

Organised by the Otago Motorcycle Club, the event attracts around 2,000 motorcycle enthusiasts from New Zealand and abroad. The rally gets its name from colloquial expression "cold enough to freeze the balls off a brass monkey" because the venue is extremely cold, being within 50 km (31 mi) of Ophir where New Zealand's coldest-ever temperature of -21.6 degrees Celsius was recorded. To warm up rally-goers, the site boasts what is described as 'the biggest bonfire ever'.

2010 was the event's 30th anniversary. Two and a half thousand riders pre-registered for the 40th and final event in 2021. The final event was intended to be run in 2019, but was postponed due to lockdown.
