= Hells Canyon Rally =

The Hells Canyon Motorcycle Rally is an annual motorcycle rally at Hells Canyon that meets in Baker City in the state of Oregon, United States. It was started c. 2000 by Steve Folkestad and a brother.

The rally attracted between 5,000 and 8,000 riders annually.

After the 2018 rally, Folkestad stepped down as the event organizer, and Todd Godfrey of High Desert Harley-Davidson (in Meridian, Idaho) took over as organizer for the 20th anniversary, July 11–14, 2019 motorcycle rally.

There was no rally in 2020 due to COVID-19 restrictions on social gatherings, and there has been no rally since.

Rally attendees (aka, "bikers") rent hotel rooms for the three-night, four day rally, or pay to pitch a tent and camp at the Baker High School football field, and this money goes to the girls' soccer and basketball teams.

== Devil's Tail ==
The signature ride of the rally is the 184-mile (296 km) route on Highway 86 and includes the "Devil's Tail" on Hells Canyon Dam Road (45.115°N 116.753°W) between Oxbow, Oregon and Hells Canyon Dam, off the Hells Canyon Scenic Byway. The Devil's Tail is a nickname bestowed by 2008 rally attendees on a 22-mile (35 km) twisty segment of the road as a homage to the "Tail of the Dragon" through Deal's Gap in North Carolina, another fine motorcycling road.

Hells Canyon Dam on the "Devil's Tail" ride was one of the dams on DamTour, a long-distance rally organized by Steve Folkestad that attracted up to 80 riders to visit 20 dams in the Pacific Northwest and ran between 2004 and 2012.
