= Oturehua =

- Township
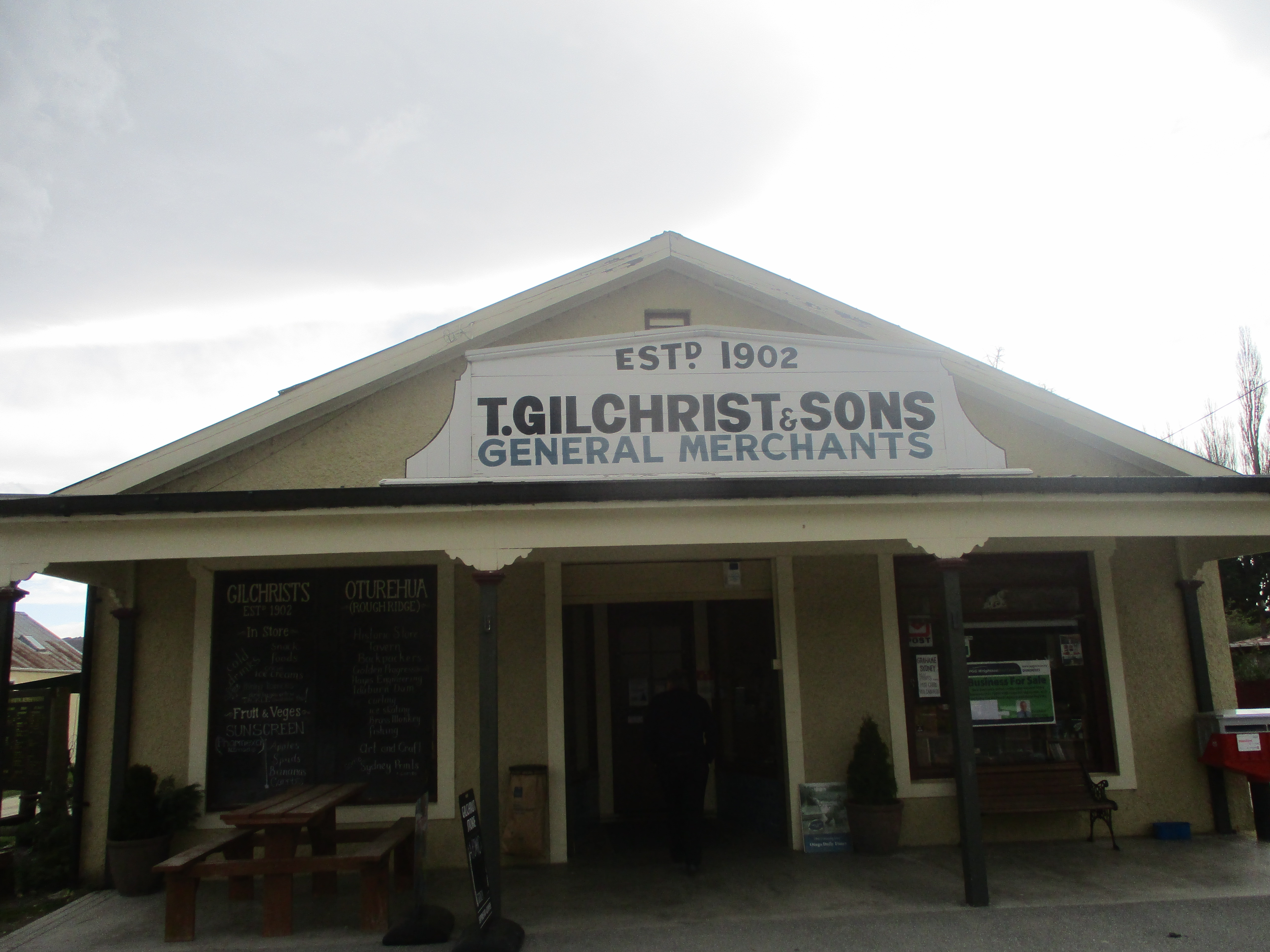
- General store in Oturehua
- Interactive map of Oturehua
- Coordinates: 45.007°S 169.913°E
- Country: New Zealand
- Region: Otago
- Territorial authority: Central Otago District
- Time zone: UTC+12 (NZST)
  - Summer (DST): UTC+13 (NZDT)
- Local iwi: Ngāi Tahu

Oturehua is a small settlement in the Ida Valley of the Maniototo, in Central Otago, in the South Island of New Zealand. The settlement is 500 m (1,600 ft) above sea level, and is located 25 km (16 mi) from Ranfurly, via the Ida Valley - Omakau Road and State Highway 85. The Otago Central Rail Trail passes through the settlement. The population was 112 residents at last count.

The New Zealand Ministry for Culture and Heritage gives a translation of "place where the summer star stands still" for Ōturēhua.

== History ==
In 1967 members of the Otago Anthropological Society surveyed a large area to the east of the town, revealing evidence of quarrying and production of flake knives carried out in the twelfth century.

Oturehua lies beneath a Rough Ridge, a range of hills. The township was also called Rough Ridge until 1907.

The area has changed little from its description in 1905 when it was described as good arable land, from which large crops are successfully raised.

In 1905, the township comprised a post and telegraph office, a store, a hotel near the railway station, a school, coal pits and a flour mill. Of these, only the Gilchrist's General Store and the Oturehua Railway Hotel remain. According to the Otago Daily Times, the Gilchrist store established in 1902 is the oldest continuously operating general store in New Zealand.

In 2025, as a result of several retirements, a group of properties representing most of the main street were put up for sale, including the Gilchrist store, the Oturehua Railway Hotel, an accommodation park, two bed-and-breakfast businesses and three homes.

== Features ==
Hayes' Engineering Works, located immediately southwest of the township, is a Category I listed historic place. It was once the home to Ernest Hayes, a farmer and flour miller who began producing and selling farm tools from his Oturehua property. Hayes invented the internationally acclaimed wire strainer, as well as pulley blocks, cattle stops and windmills.

The Idaburn Dam, located 3 km southwest of Oturehua along the Ida Valley Omakau Road is used for curling bonspiels when conditions permit. It is also the site of the annual mid-winter Brass Monkey Motorcycle Rally, which was held until 2021, though many motorcyclists continue to make a pilgrimage to the site on Kings Birthday Weekend of their own volition, out of tradition

The Otago Central Rail Trail runs through Oturehua, adjacent the Ida Valley Omakau Road. The settlement has a number of accommodation options.

The remnants of the Golden Progress quartz mine are located 2 km east of Oturehua on Rough Ridge. These workings are notable as they still retain an intact poppet head, the only surviving one in the Otago goldfields. The Golden Progress poppet head was constructed of Australian hardwood and erected later than most, in 1928, which explains its survival. The mine was worked by three lignite-fired boilers, two for the poppet head to drive the winding gear and one to drive the battery further down the gully.

== Education ==
Poolburn School is a co-educational state primary school for Year 1 to 8 students, with a roll of 29 as of July 2026.

== Notes ==
Media related to Oturehua at Wikimedia Commons
