= Burt Munro =

New Zealand motorcycle racer

- Born: Herbert James Munro; 25 March 1899; Invercargill, New Zealand
- Died: 6 January 1978 (aged 78); Invercargill, New Zealand
- Resting place: Eastern Cemetery, Invercargill, New Zealand
- Occupations: Carpenter; New Zealand Home Guard; Speedway rider Motorcycle salesman Mechanic
- Known for: Land Speed record holder
- Spouse(s): Florence Beryl Martyn (m. 1927; div. 1947)
- Children: 4

Herbert James Munro (25 March 1899 – 6 January 1978) was a motorcycle racer from New Zealand, famous for setting a motorcycle speed record in the 1000cc Streamliner Modified Fuel category, at Bonneville, on 26 August 1967. This record still stands as of November 2026; Munro was 68 and was riding a 47-year-old machine when he set his last record.

Working from his home in Invercargill, Munro spent 20 years highly modifying the 1920 Indian Scout that he had bought that year. Munro set his first New Zealand speed record in 1938, and later set seven more. He travelled to compete at the Bonneville Salt Flats, attempting to set world speed records. During his ten visits to the salt flats, he set three speed records in the American Motorcyclist Association's National Records, one of which still stands as of May 2026.

Munro's efforts, and success, are the basis of the film The World's Fastest Indian (2005), starring Anthony Hopkins, and an earlier 1971 short documentary film Burt Munro: Offerings to the God of Speed, both directed by Roger Donaldson.

== Early life ==
Munro was born in 1899 to William Munro, a farmer and Lily Agnes Robinson in Invercargill. His twin sister died at birth and Munro grew up on a farm in Edendale, east of Invercargill. His grandfather James Robertson Munro was from northern Scotland and settled on a farm in Invercargill.

Munro's interest in speed began at an early age, riding the family's fastest horse across the farm, despite the complaints of his father. Trips via train to the Invercargill port were a rare source of excitement, and the arrival of cars, motorcycles and aircraft added to Burt's eagerness to join the world outside his farm. As Munro's family discouraged his endeavours outside farm life, he became constantly bored with daily routine. At the outbreak of the First World War, he intended to go to war as soon as he was old enough, for a chance to see the world.

Munro remained on the family farm until the end of the First World War, when his father sold the farm. At that time, Munro worked on the Otira Tunnel construction until recalled to work with his father on a newly purchased farm. After this he became a professional speedway rider, but returned home to the family farm at the start of the Great Depression. Finding work as a motorcycle salesman and mechanic, he raced motorcycles and rose to the top of the New Zealand motorcycle scene, racing on Oreti Beach and later in Melbourne, Australia.

After the Second World War, Munro and his wife divorced, and he subsequently gave up work to reside in a lock-up garage.

== Challenges ==
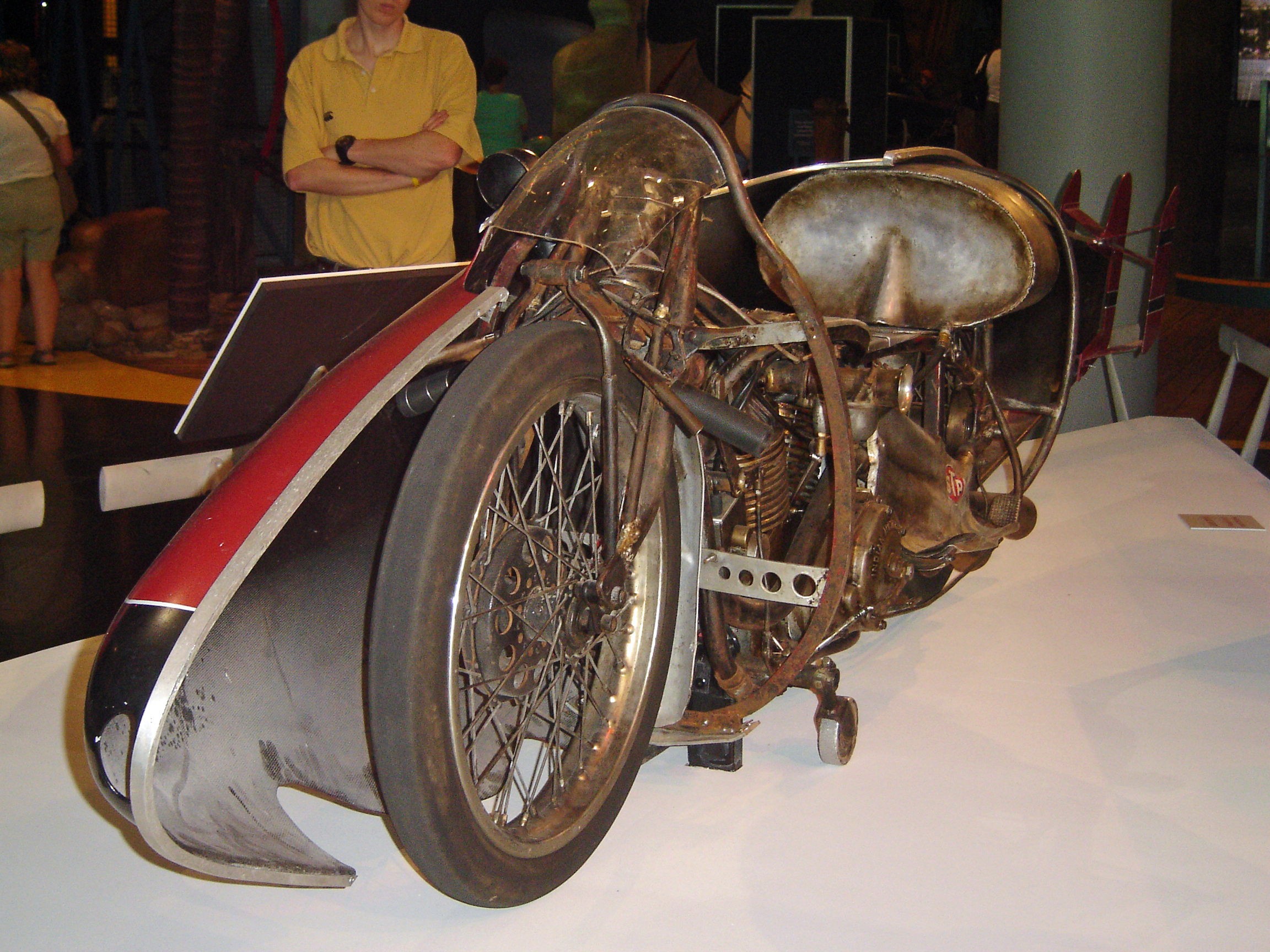
A replica of the 1920 Indian (with half the exterior removed to show detail) that Burt Munro used to set his record in 1967

Munro's Indian Scout was an early model, the 627th Scout to leave the American factory. The bike had an original top speed of 55 mph (89 km/h), but this did not satisfy Munro, so in 1926 he began to modify the bike.

Munro's two greatest challenges while modifying his bike were his lack of money and that he worked full-time as a motorcycle salesman. He would often work overnight on his bikes (he had a 1936 Velocette MSS as well), then he would go to work in the morning, having had no sleep. Being of modest means, he would often make his own parts and tools instead of having them professionally built. He would cast parts in old tins, make his own barrels, pistons, flywheels, and such.

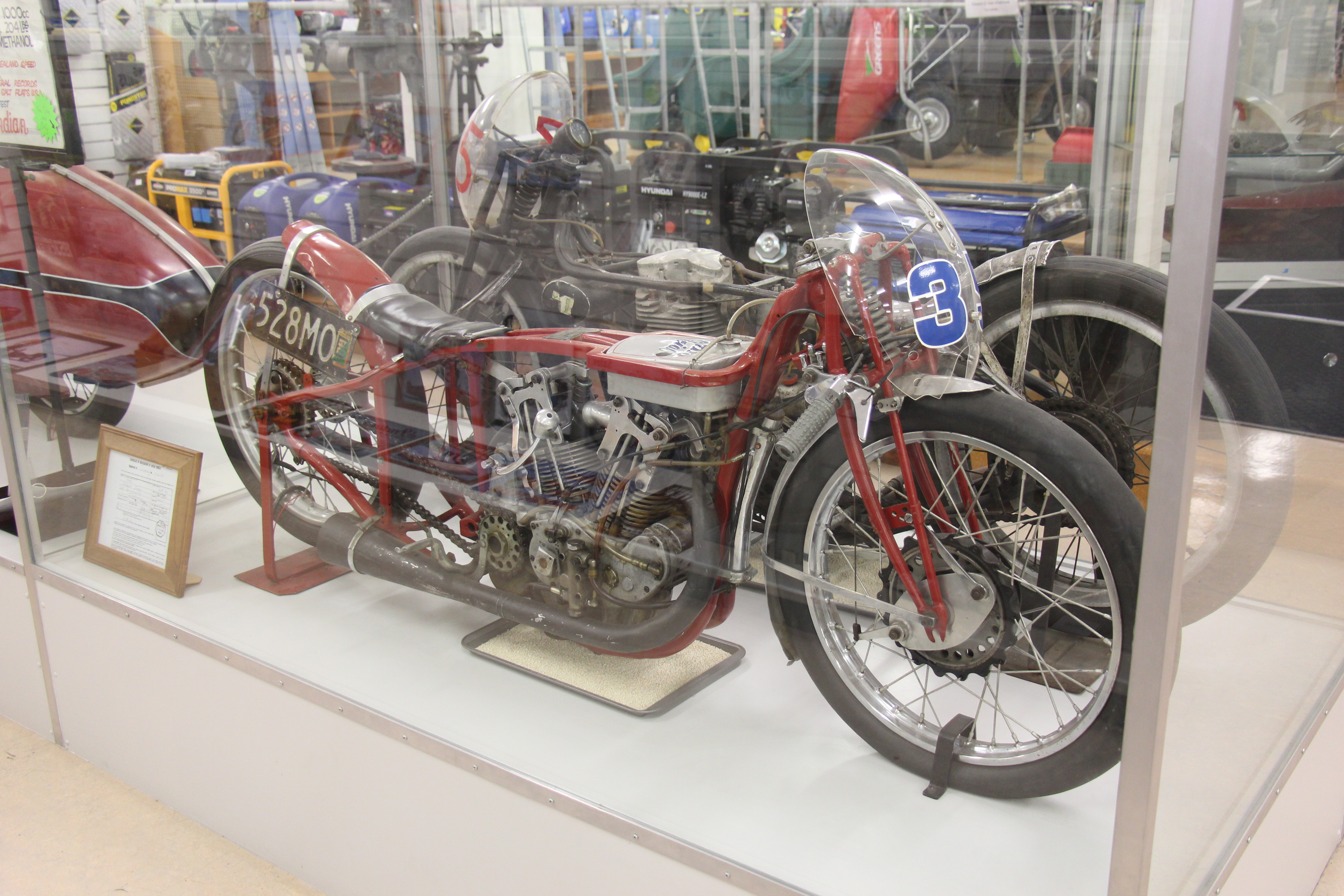
Munro's Indian on display in Invercargill

In its final stages, the Indian's displacement was 950 cc (as built it was 600 cc) and was driven by a triple chain drive system.

The "Munro Special," as Munro called his bike, is now owned by Neville Hayes, in New Zealand's South Island, and is on display at E Hayes and Sons, Invercargill.

== Bonneville Salt Flats World Record and Speed Week ==
The Bonneville Salt Flats in northwestern Utah, US, is known worldwide for its many miles of flat, compacted salt. During Speed Week, usually in mid-late August, vehicle enthusiasts from around the world gather at Bonneville.

Munro travelled to Bonneville fourteen times, the first three times for "sightseeing" purposes. In the nine times he raced at Bonneville, Munro set three world records: in 1962, in 1966 and in 1967. He also qualified at over 200 mph (320 km/h), but that was an unofficial run and was not counted. Burt's records were certified and recorded by the American Motorcyclist Association in their national records database.

One of these, which still stands and what Burt is most famous for, was the record for the 1000cc Streamliner Modified Fuel category (referred to in the American Motorcyclist Association's National Records as 1000-S-AF) which was achieved in his modified Indian Scout in 1967. This record was set during the 1967 Bonneville Motorcycle Speed Trials where he was certified to have traveled at 184 mph (296 km/h). The record was never contested and still stands as of January 2026. The American Motorcyclist Association has since retired the 1000-S-AF category.

Following the misspelling of his name in an American motorcycling magazine in 1957, Bert Munro changed his name to Burt.

== Personal life ==
A son of William Munro (1870–1949) and Lily Agnes Munro (1875–1967), he had two brothers and three sisters, Eva, Ruby and the novelist Florence Preston. The accidental death of his older brother at the age of 13 had a profound effect on his life. Munro and Florence Beryl Martyn were married in 1927 and had four children. They were divorced in 1947.

Having had angina since the late 1950s, Munro had a stroke in 1977, and was admitted to hospital. He found his coordination had diminished. Frustrated, but wanting his motorcycles to remain in Southland, he sold both machines to his friend, Norman Hayes, of E. Hayes & Sons. Munro died of natural causes on 6 January 1978, aged 78 years. He is buried at Invercargill's Eastern Cemetery, with his parents and brother.

== Records/runs ==
- In 1962, he set an 883cc class record of 178.971 mph (2-way average) with his engine bored out to 853cc.
- In 1963, during his first run, the Indian's v-twin blew up at over 195 mph (313.88 km/h), ending his S-A 883cc record attempts for 1963. His qualifying run was right before then, during which Burt turned in 183.673 mph (295.61 km/h). His Indian was still at 853cc.
- At Bonneville in 1964, he ran his 184 mph (296.12 km/h) qualifying run before bad weather ended speed week for the year. His Indian was now 871cc.
- Bonneville 1965 was a zero year for him, as he had some low-speed runs in the high 160 mph range (265 km/h to 274 km/h).
- In 1966, he set a 1000 cc class record of 168.66 mph (271.43 km/h; 2-way average) with his engine at 905 cc. His unofficial top speed was 212 mph (341.2 km/h), while his qualifying speed was 172 mph (270.8 km/h).
- In 1967, his engine was bored out to 953 cc and he set an under 1000 cc class record of 184.087 mph (2-way average). To qualify, he made a one-way run of 184 mph (296.12 km/h), then later on he re-qualified at 190.070 mph (305.88 km/h). His highest recorded measured mile was 188 mph (302.557 km/h).
- In 1968, the Indian achieved a lower speed of 155 mph (249.448 km/h) due to magneto issues.
- In 1969, he recorded two runs at 191 mph (307.4 km/h). He couldn't complete a return run due to unforeseen mechanical issues, which meant no new record. After 14 test runs on the salt in 4 days, he ran out of time. His Indian was now at 965 cc.
- At Bonneville 1970, he decided to switch his fuel from the methanol; previously he had always run his Indian on to nitromethane. Even after making several needed adjustments, the v-twin still burned up all his spare pistons. His Indian was bumped up to 985 cc.
- At Bonneville in 1971, Burt ran the Indian on the salt for the last time ever. Due to new and very strict streamliner rules, he couldn't run with the fiberglass body. Without the shell, the Indian was now seriously over-geared, and he ran his last run at 148.51 mph (239.036 km/h).
- In 1975, he made his 14th and final trip to Bonneville, as a spectator.
- In 2006, he was inducted into the AMA Motorcycle Hall of Fame.
- In 2014, 36 years after his death, he was posthumously awarded a 1967 record of 184.087 mph (296.2593 km/h) after his son John noticed a calculation error by AMA at that time.

== Legacy ==
=== The World's Fastest Indian ===
Munro was the subject of a 2005 film, The World's Fastest Indian, based on a composite of his Bonneville speed runs. This film depicts a determined old man who, despite facing many difficulties, travels from New Zealand to the USA to test-run his motorcycle west of the Great Salt Lake. The disclaimer says: "While this motion picture is based upon historical events, certain characters names have been changed, some main characters are composites or invented and a number of incidents fictionalised."

=== The Burt Munro Challenge ===
Inspired by the 2005 film, the Invercargill Motorcycle Club has held a "Burt Munro Challenge" motorcycle competition annually since 2006 (except 2007, 2017 and 2022). The 2023 event ran for four days, including a hill climb, drag racing, beach racing, sprint, speedway and street racing.

=== The E. Hayes Motorworks Collection ===
The E. Hayes hardware store in Invercargill maintains a free museum collection featuring Munro and his work, including the original "Munro Special" Indian.

=== Spirit of Munro ===
In March 2013, Indian Motorcycle announced that it was producing a custom-built streamliner named the Spirit of Munro. The motorcycle was built to showcase the Thunder Stroke 111 engine to be used in one of the 2014 road models. The company said the Spirit of Munro Scout was a tribute to Munro's achievements with the Indian Scout and to all Indians of old.
