= Dave Preston (motorcycling) =

American motorcycle writer (born c. 1947)

David Preston
- Born: ca. 1947
- Occupations: Writer and corporate PR
- Writing career
- Language: English
- Subject: Motorcycling
- Notable work: Motorcycle 101
- Website: davidpreston.biz

David Preston (born circa 1947) is an author in the Seattle area. His published works include Motorcycle 101 and Motorcycle 201 on motorcycle rider safety, and the novels Mourning Ride and The Third Marcia. The Seattle Times called Motorcycle 101 a "good introduction" for new riders.

Preston has been a contributor to Sound Rider! since 2000 and American Road magazine since the early 2000s.

In addition to being an author, Preston has worked as a high school English teacher, radio announcer, and public relations person at two Seattle area motorcycle dealers.

== Bibliography ==
- Dave Preston (2004). Motorcycle 101. Mixed Media. ISBN 0974742007.
- Dave Preston (2010). Motorcycle 201. Amazon Digital Services. ASIN B004E3XBEQ.
- Dave Preston (2011). Motorcycle Heart, Theory, and Practice. Amazon Digital Services. ASIN B004SBO0LW.
- Dave Preston (2011). Mourning Ride. Amazon Digital Services. ASIN B004O6MUJK.
- Dave Preston (2012). The Third Marcia. Amazon Digital Services. ASIN B007JY1UIG.
- Dave Preston (2012). No Corner Left Unturned: 40 Years of Northwest Motorsports. Will Preston/Amazon Digital Services. ASIN B008Z3XMZO.
- Dave Preston (2013). Identity Ride (The Harrison Thomas Mysteries). Will Preston/Amazon Digital Services. ASIN B00AYPM0Y0.
