= Oyster Run =

Annual motorcycle rally in Anacortes, Washington, USA

- Dates: Fourth Sunday of September
- Locations: Anacortes, Washington, USA
- Coordinates: 48°29′52″N 122°37′56″W
- Founded: 1981
- Previous event: September 24, 2023
- Next event: September 22, 2024
- Attendance: c. 20,000 (2008)
- Website: www.oysterrun.org

The Oyster Run is a motorcycle rally held annually each September since 1981 in Anacortes, Washington. It is the largest rally in the Pacific Northwest with 2006 attendance estimated in the tens of thousands.

There was no rally in 2020 or 2021 due to the COVID-19 pandemic.
