= Iron Butt Association =

US-based organization dedicated to endurance motorcycle riding

- Abbreviation: IBA
- Formation: 1984
- Members: 75,000+ (A membership roster is maintained)
- Website: Official site

The Iron Butt Association (IBA) is a US-based organization dedicated to safe long-distance motorcycle riding, which claims membership of over 75,000 people.

The IBA is a loose-knit organization with only one way to earn membership: ride one of the several rides the IBA certifies. The minimum is the Saddle Sore 1000 – 1,000 miles (1,600 km) in 24 hours or less.

== History ==
The Iron Butt Rally first ran in 1984 with 10 riders. From 1984 to 1987 the rally started from Montgomeryville Cycle Center near Philadelphia, Pennsylvania. The Iron Butt was not held again until 1991 when it came under the management of the Iron Butt Association. While the basic format of the original rally remained, two important things changed: to ensure the quality of the event, the rally is run every other year, and the starting and ending points are rotated to different locations within the United States. 107 riders started and 89 finished the latest Iron Butt Rally, which ran in 2017.

Beginning in 1993, shorter rides were arranged that lasted in duration from one to many days, and while the Iron Butt Rally is a large, organized event with a plotted course, the other rides are left up to the competitor to accomplish at their own accord. Some riders prefer to complete a ride solo, while some clubs have arranged rides in groups of up to 30 riders. But while the rally is a monitored event, the riders of other events must monitor themselves. An example is the Saddle Sore 1000, where thorough documentation of the ride must be made, by collecting time-stamped gas and business receipts along the way, and by keeping a trip log recording mileage and location. These documents are then submitted by mail with a fee to the IBA, where it is then processed and an award given if the requirements are met.

The Iron Butt Association has members around the world. Those in the UK run their own rally each year called the Brit Butt Rally, a 12-hour rally and Jorvik Rally a short 8 rally Riders from all over Europe, Norway, Middle East and Australia have entered. There is also a 12-hour teaser rally called the Brit Butt Light. Iron Butt UK has grown from seven registered riders in 2005 to over 350 riders completing Iron Butt rides within the UK during 2009. Iron Butt UK also teamed up with the Royal British Legion Riders branch in organizing a 24-hour 1000 mile run with over 175 riders taking part. The previous world record was 152, however the UK riders were pipped to the post by another US ride of over 400 riders.

Currently the association is headed by Michael J Kneebone.

== IBA sanctioned events ==
The IBA suggests several types of long-distance rides to challenge riders. It is perhaps best known for the Iron Butt Rally, an organized event that is invitation only, through a raffle system. Additionally, the Iron Butt Association hosts the Saddle Sore 1000, the Bun Burner 1500, the Bun Burner Gold, the 50 cc Quest, the National Parks Tour Master Traveler Award, the coveted 10/10ths Challenge, the very exclusive 100K Club, and other longer themed rides taking place on different routes around the world. Besides the Iron Butt Rally, none of these rides are organized events, but rather individual endeavors planned and executed by individual riders on routes and at times they choose.

=== Iron Butt Rally ===
The Iron Butt Rally is a competitive motorcycle road rally held in the United States. It was first held in 1984, and beginning in 1991, now takes place in odd numbered years, usually in August. The rally lasts 11 days, and riders often travel over 11,000 miles (18,000 km) in that time. During the rally, entrants earn points by riding their motorcycles to various "bonus" locations in the U.S. and Canada. A bonus is a task or destination with a point value. To earn the points for a bonus, a rider must provide evidence by photographing an object or scene, purchasing a particular item, or by various other means specified by the organizers.

The rally consists of one or more checkpoints, which may be located anywhere the United States, and one or more lists of bonuses with locations, times of availability (if limited), and varying point values. Each leg of the rally has its own bonus list, and only the bonuses for the leg currently being ridden are known to riders and can be earned. A bonus list typically contains far more bonuses than can be earned in the time allotted during a leg. This introduces a significant strategic element to the rally, since each rider must determine for him/herself which bonuses to attempt, and what route to use to reach them, while still reaching the next checkpoint before it closes.

Entry into the Iron Butt Rally is by lottery only and every lottery entry must be an Iron Butt Member first.

To be considered a finisher of the event, a rider must be present at each of the checkpoints within a specific time window, and must earn a minimum number of bonus points during the rally. Additional achievement levels (gold, silver, bronze) can be reached by earning more than the minimum required points.

Themes are often employed, with 2011 being about visiting U.S. states and their capitals; 2009 were crime scenes; 2007 was about gateway and arches (i.e. Perce Rock on the Atlantic, St. Louis Arch, and Golden Gate Bridge on the Pacific); and 2005 was about lighthouses.

First-time finishers are assigned a 3-digit number membership to replace their previously assigned number...that often are five digits in length and over 1,000. As of 2019, slightly more than 600 people have officially finished the Iron Butt Rally. In 2019, Wendy Crockett became the first woman to win the rally.

=== Books ===
Many books have either focused on or featured the Iron Butt Rally, some of the most notable of which are listed here. In 1997, Ron Ayres published Against the Wind: A Rider's Account of the Incredible Iron Butt Rally, chronicling his experience in the 1995 rally. Joel Rappoport published Hopeless Class in 2012 about his Iron Butt Rally experience in 2009. Finally, Melissa Holbrook Pierson's The Man Who Would Stop at Nothing: Long Distance Motorcycling's Endless Road features the IBA in a broader discussion of the long-distance riding subculture.

=== Documentaries ===
In 2007, a feature-length documentary, Hard Miles, was produced about that year's Iron Butt rally. The DVD chronicled the riders, organizers, routes, strategy, controversy and myriad other details. The high-definition video was received as a welcome update to the small list of professional media on the subject.

The 2009 rally was also filmed for a documentary DVD called Hard Miles 2 and included additional material and interviews away from checkpoints. No documentary was made for 2011.

=== Common Rides (SS1000, BB1500, BBG1500) ===
The Saddlesore and Bun-Burner were started in California by the California Motorcycle Touring Association (CMTA). These were originally fixed-course group-rides. Pressure soon came from many riders who could not make the annual trek to California, so Les Martin, the driving force behind the CMTA, offered a ride that could be completed anywhere. When Les retired in 1993, the CMTA stopped holding and certifying 1000-in-24 and 1500-in-36 rides, and donated the Saddlesore 1000 and Bun-Burner events to the Iron Butt Association, which had not previously administered a 1000-in-24 ride. Since then the IBA has been sponsoring the Saddlesore 1000 (1,000 miles in 24 hours) and the Bun-Burner (1,500 miles in 36 hours), and added the more extreme Bun-Burner Gold (1,500 miles in 24 hours).

=== 50 cc Quest ===
Not to be confused with a ride for bikes limited to 50 cc of displacement, the 50 cc Quest is named for riding across the United States from Coast to Coast in less than 50 hours. It was originally conceived by Dave McQueeney as a New York to San Francisco trip of 2,910 miles (4,680 km). In the first ten years of its existence only ten riders were officially recognized to successfully complete it. In the meantime a ride from Jacksonville, Florida to San Diego, California has become the most popular route, as it is only 2,345 miles (3,774 km) long.

=== 100CCC ===
Two 50cc Quests done back to back (coast to coast to coast) in 100 hours or less. This is considered an Extreme Ride.

=== National Parks Tour Master Traveler ===
The object of the IBA's National Parks Tour is to take some time to visit the hundreds of National Parks, National Historic Sites, National Recreation Areas, and National Monuments located in the United States and Canada.

The riders must purchase a Passport to Your National Parks book, then proceed to visit at least 50 of these sites or parks listed in the Passport book in at least 25 states and provinces within the period of one year. Start and finish times are up to the rider, as long as the time frame does not exceed the one year allotment.

=== 10/10ths Challenge ===
10,000 miles (16,000 km) in 10 days.

=== The 100K Club ===
The Iron Butt Association's 100K Club consists of riders who have ridden more than 100,000 miles (160,000 km) in one year.

=== RBLR 1000 ===
The Iron Butt Association in the United Kingdom and The Royal British Legion Riders Branch (RBLR) jointly organize the annual RBLR 1000 event. The RBLR is a motorcyclist's branch of The Royal British Legion, a veterans' organization. In 2018 the RBLR 1000 raised over UK£33,000 for the Poppy Appeal. 2019 it will be around the same. 2019 was the tenth running of the event
