= Hoka Hey Motorcycle Challenge =

North American motorcycle endurance challenge

The Hoka Hey Motorcycle Challenge is a motorcycle endurance challenge. Entry is limited to riders of American-manufacturer V-twin-style motorcycles. It is named after a rallying call of the Sioux Indians and is designed to test the participants’ physical, mental and emotional boundaries.

The inaugural 2010 Challenge took participants along a mandatory route on back roads across the United States and Canada. The route crossed multiple mountain ranges, 33 Indian reservations, 25 national forests, eight deserts and six national parks. Challenge routes travel secondary roads with directions revealed at a series of specific checkpoints. The event guidelines prohibit speeding and require contenders to navigate without the use of GPS and to sleep outside throughout the entire course.

== 2010 race ==
2010 Hoka Hey Motorcycle Challenge

Race details
- Date: June 20 - July 4, 2010
- Region: Key West, Florida to Homer, Alaska
- Discipline: Motorcycle road rally
- Type: Harley-Davidson motorcycles only
- Organiser: Jim Durham AKA Jim RedCloud
- Web site: www.hokaheychallenge.com

The 2010 Hoka Hey Motorcycle Challenge covered over 8,500 miles (13,700 km). It began in Key West, Florida on June 20 and ended in Homer, Alaska on July 4, 2010. Event organizers named the event after the Lakota language battle cry of legendary Sioux warrior, Crazy Horse, meaning "Let's go!" (and not "It’s a good day to die", as some have long thought).

Approximately 600 riders participated in the event and all were required to ride Harley-Davidson motorcycles. The exact route, which traveled primarily over secondary roads through some of the country's greatest scenic, historic and cultural spots, was revealed to riders at a series of checkpoints.

The poor economy impacted the anticipated number of participants in the 2010 Hoka Hey. With approximately half of the anticipated registrants, organizers had to dip into their own pockets to cover event expenses, including the $500,000 purse. As a result, no net proceeds were available to share with eight named non-profits as originally planned. The non-profits did, however, benefit from additional exposure by being associated with the 2010 Challenge and ancillary fundraising events undertaken by Hoka Hey challengers have contributed to still other charitable causes.

Less than twenty-four hours into the event there had been three separate crashes involving Hoka Hey participants on the same stretch of highway. One man had to be airlifted to a hospital due to multiple leg fractures. A number of riders complained that the maps they were given did not match the actual roads, that signs marking the routes were missing, and that the rules governing the race seemed to be engineered to make it impossible for anyone to claim the prize. Hoka Hey organizers acknowledge that the directions were difficult to follow and reminded riders that they have always said they "would not just give the prize money away."

Six days into the event participant Charles C. Lynn died in an accident in Wyoming, when he lost control of his bike and crashed into a drainage ditch. He was not wearing a helmet.

Eight days into the event, on June 28, riders Frank Kelly and Will Barclay crossed the finish line in Homer simultaneously with a total time of 190 hours and 20 minutes. The two men stated that they did not wish to get into a dangerous "road duel" and so they resolved to cross the line together. Race officials insisted on a battery of checks before declaring a winner, including drug testing, checking for speeding tickets during the event, and even a lie detector test.

On July 1, one of the challengers struck and injured two bicyclists on the Parks Highway who were training to participate in several triathlons. The cyclists sustained several injuries and the challenge participant, Vik Livingston, sustained serious injuries, including a punctured lung, and was hospitalized. Livingston was observed not to have applied the brakes at all before the crash, which is consistent with accidents involving drivers that have fallen asleep. Alaska State Troopers collected a blood sample for testing.

On July 2, a formal complaint against the race organizers was filed with the Florida Attorney General's office, against event organizer Jim Durham, also known as Jim Red Cloud, alleging that the event was fraudulent and that Red Cloud had admitted to the riders that part of the purpose for the event was to raise money for water wells and infrastructure reservations. Red Cloud did not communicate directly with the press or the riders during most of the event.

On the thirteenth day of the event, approximately 110 riders had arrived in Homer, including several female riders and at least one husband and wife team.

On July 4, participant Kenneth J. Green died in a crash on the Glenn Highway, which was not part of the prescribed route of the race. Green was apparently aware he would not win and was taking a shortcut. He was not wearing a helmet and was ejected from his bike in the crash and declared dead at the accident scene.

Despite repeated claims that a winner would be declared and the prize money awarded at the Fourth of July event in Homer, no winner was declared and no prize money was evident. Event organizers claimed that they were waiting for potential winners to take polygraph tests and that the prize would now be awarded during the Sturgis Motorcycle Rally. During Red Cloud's address to the crowd at the Fourth of July celebration, it was revealed that the Hoka Hey Challenge would be run again in 2011, but would have a different route and different organizers. At least two riders got married at the end of the event, including one rider who had special dispensation for his fiancée to ride with him the entire trip.

Despite being announced as the official winner, apparently because his front tire was slightly in front of Kelly's at the finish, Barclay agreed to honor their commitment to share the prize money, which was awarded to Barclay by Red Cloud in a ceremony at the Sturgis Motorcycle rally.

Publicists for the Hoka Hey 2010 characterized it as a success despite the various problems.

== 2011 ==
2011 Hoka Hey Motorcycle Challenge

Race details
- Date: August 5–21, 2011
- Region: Mesa, Arizona to Nova Scotia
- Discipline: Motorcycle road rally
- Type: Harley-Davidson motorcycles only
- Race director: Beth Durham
- Web site: www.hokaheychallenge.com

The 2011 event began August 5, 2011, in Mesa, Arizona and ended in Nova Scotia on August 21. The entry fee was $1,000 and riders had to be at least 18 years of age to participate. Two days of pre-race activities and events beginning August 3 in Mesa, Arizona. The race departed at 6:00 am on August 5 and covered 10,000 miles (16,000 km) through 48 states and Canada. There were celebrations and sponsor recognition at each of the 15 check points. An official Hoka Hey Challenge 2011 Road Glide was commissioned by Harley-Davidson was displayed in the Harley-Davidson Museum located in Milwaukee, Wisconsin. Additional events took place when riders arrived in Nova Scotia.

The 2011 Hoka Hey Motorcycle Challenge was directed by an organizing committee composed of various professionals and event stakeholders. A documentary, featuring footage and stories from the 2010 Challenge is in development.

== 2012 and 2013 ==
The Hoka Hey Motorcycle Challenge continued to be run as an annual event offering cash prizes to top finishers during this time.

In 2012, organizers united to work closely with the Seneca People to bring attention to the plight of Indian people around the U.S. This Event, beginning on August 5th, 2012 in Las Vegas, NV traveled just over 6,000 miles to end on the Seneca Indian Territory near Gowanda, NY. The owners of Wolf’s Run Transport welcomed Challengers by hosting the finish line and throwing one of the best End of the Road parties to date.

In 2013 the Hoka Hey Motorcycle Challenge began and ended in the heart of the Seneca Nation at Wolf's Run with Wolf’s Run Transport and Gowanda Harley-Davidson as the hosts once again. Challengers left Wolf's Run on the 23rd of June, 2013 and traveled into Quebec, Canada headed toward the Arctic Circle. Approximately, 7,600 miles later they had circled the Great Lakes, riding through the Black Hills, and the plains of Texas rolling along some of the most technically challenging roads the US has to offer before returning to the Seneca Territory where the End of the Road party surpassed even that of 2012.

== 2014 ==
The Challenge continued to be run as a race every year until 2014 when the Medicine Show Land Trust ceased to be the managing body. The Hoka Hey Motorcycle Challenge came under the direction of the Medicine Show LLC and a Board of Directors was selected from previous riders. The first order of business was to reformat the event from a "race" to strictly a long distance endurance ride where each participant would pit themselves against the road and not one another. A Mission Statement was adopted whereby the Medicine Show LLC endeavors to:

1. Enrich – to cultivate a philosophy of respect, honor, integrity and compassion
2. Empower – to promote self-determination and strength
3. Unite – to join together to incite positive action.

The frequency of the events was also changed to once every two years and riders are strongly encouraged to raise money for a charity of their choosing.

== Hoka Hey Rendezvous ==
In 2014 it was decided to orchestrate the Challenge every two years but, it was quickly realized there was a flaw; nobody wanted to wait two years. Hence the Hoka Hey Rendezvous was founded. During off years a quick weekend gathering was to be offered for old and new riders to get together and share stories, rekindle old friendships and create new ones. The first Rendezvous was a memorial ride for those who had fallen; starting in Red Cloud, NE and ending at Hot Springs, SD with a first every sanctioned procession down Main St in the city of Sturgis during the 2015 Sturgis Motorcycle Rally. Rendezvous in 2017, 2019, 2021, 2023 and 2025 were held at locations ranging from Eastern Kentucky to the Mountains of New Mexico. The Rendezvous has become the culmination of the previous year's Event when those who went above andbeyond are honored and recognized. Specifics about the next Challenge are also announced at this time.

== 2016 to date ==
As of 2026, the Hoka Hey Motorcycle Challenge continues to operate every other year, kicking off from a new location each time. Averaging about 10,000 miles long; the routes follow a different course each time, taking riders to the remotest corners of North America with vast amounts of technical riding, primarily on two lane roads.

The Hoka Hey Motorcycle Challenge started as a means for a single person to gain $500K. The concept of “cash as an incentive” wore out its welcome in 2013. As of 2024, riders of the Hoka Hey Motorcycle Challenge have raised over $2.5M for assorted charities across the United States. There is no doubt that the Challenge has been the catalyst for changing people's lives.

== Founder James Durham Red Cloud (1955 to 2017) ==
The Founder of the Hoka Hey Motorcycle Challenge was a prominent figure in the organization. Red Cloud believed that the stronger the warrior is – the stronger the people are. He believed that by facing and overcoming obstacles along the way, participants would be encouraged to journey into a deep and critical examination of their own motives, actions and beliefs and then translate their newfound strength and confidence into a willingness to act on behalf of others. Many believe the Challenge has surpassed even Red Clouds's expectations.

== See also ==
- List of long-distance motorcycle riders
