= Poker run =

Charity competition event

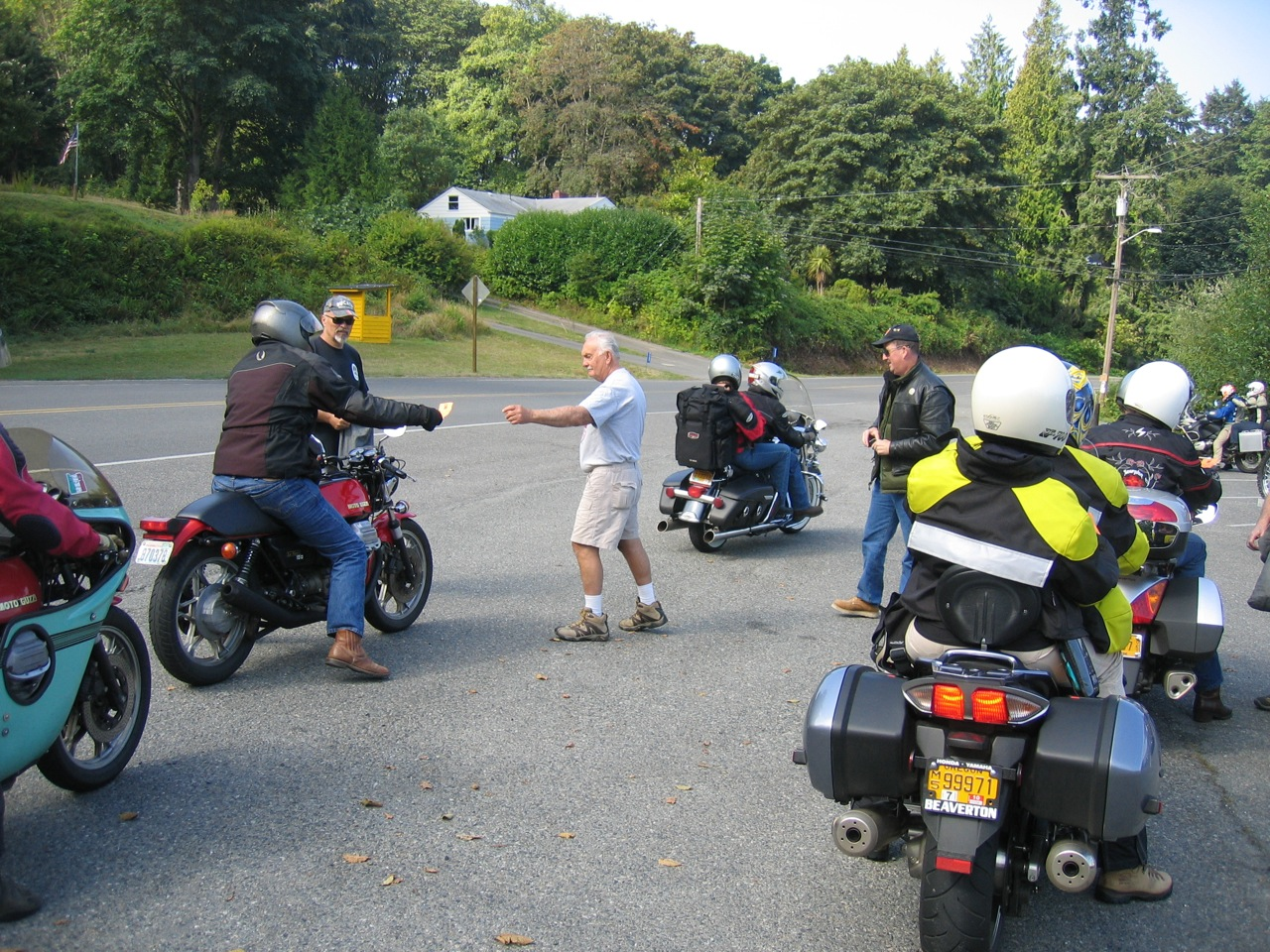
Riders at a checkpoint in the 2009 Isle of Vashon TT poker run.

A poker run is an organized event in which participants, usually using motorcycles, all-terrain vehicles, boats, snowmobiles, horses, on foot or other means of transportation, must visit five to seven checkpoints, drawing a playing card at each one. The object is to have the best poker hand at the end of the run. Having the best hand and winning is purely a matter of chance. The event has a time limit, however the individual participants are not timed.

According to the Guinness Book of World Records, the record for the largest event was set in 2009 with 2,136 motorcyclists benefiting the Fallen Firefighter Survivors Foundation (FFSF).

The record for the largest single venue event was set in 2012, with 586 motorcyclists raising money for Prostate Cancer research in Ottawa, Canada.

== Variations ==
Poker runs usually require a fee to enter and some for each additional hand; in some events a small part of the fee may go to funding the event, including the prizes, while the rest goes to the event's charity recipient or club treasury. In charity events usually most, if not all of the funds goes to the selected charity. Prizes, such as money, plaques, or merchandise donated by commercial sponsors of the event, are awarded for the best hand. Some runs will award smaller awards for lower hands or even the lowest hand.

Each checkpoint might offer food or entertainment, either covered by the entry fee or at additional cost. Each participant is responsible to maintain the integrity of their hand during the run. Hands are usually written down or marked with punched holes on a ticket, rather than assembled from actual cards given to the riders. The only requirement is that riders arrive at the final checkpoint by the time prizes are awarded, usually near the end of the day, typically at a party with food and refreshments. It might be required that participants collect all of the requisite number of cards, five or seven, or they might be allowed to miss checkpoints and use a hand with fewer cards, though the odds of a winning hand are much lower.

== Transport ==
Although most events are on motorcycles, off-road vehicles, boats, or horses, events involving small aircraft, ATVs, bicycles, golf carts, personal watercraft, snowmobiles, skateboards, running, canoeing and kayaking, and geocaching have been held.

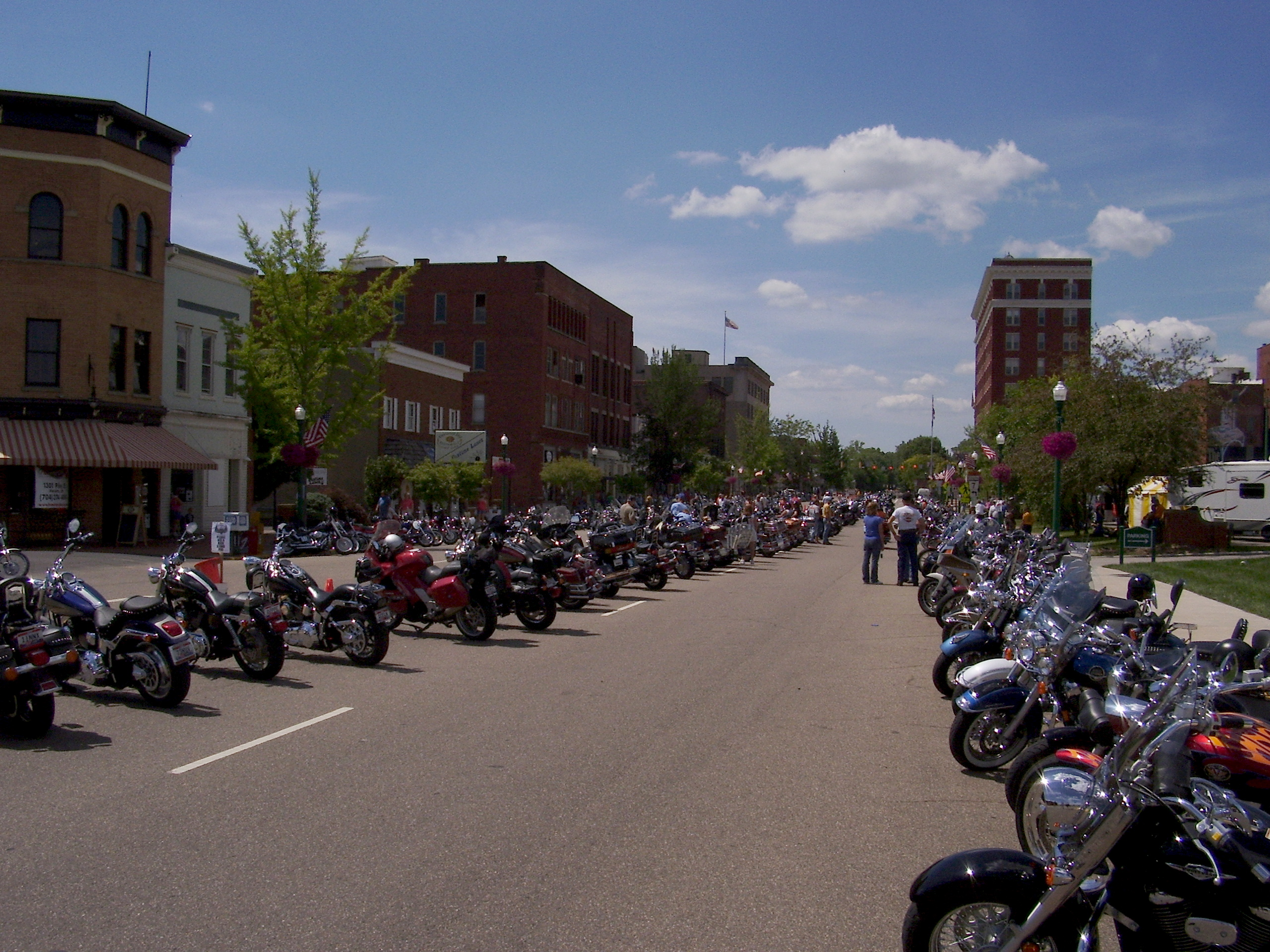
Street lined with motorcycles at a rally in Marietta, Ohio which incorporates a "Ride for the Red" dice run benefiting the American Red Cross.

== Dice run ==
A dice run is one variation, where instead of collecting cards, participants roll dice at each stop. The object is to have the highest score as determined by the sum of the dice rolls.

== See also ==
- Geocaching
- Motorcycle club
- Orienteering
- Rogaining
- Trail riding
