= Motorcycle rally =

Gathering of motorcycle enthusiasts

A motorcycle rally is a gathering of motorcycle enthusiasts. Rallies can be large or small, and one-time or recurring. Some rallies are ride-in events, whereas some like the Iron Butt Rally involve days of riding and an actual gathering only at the end of the ride.

== North America ==
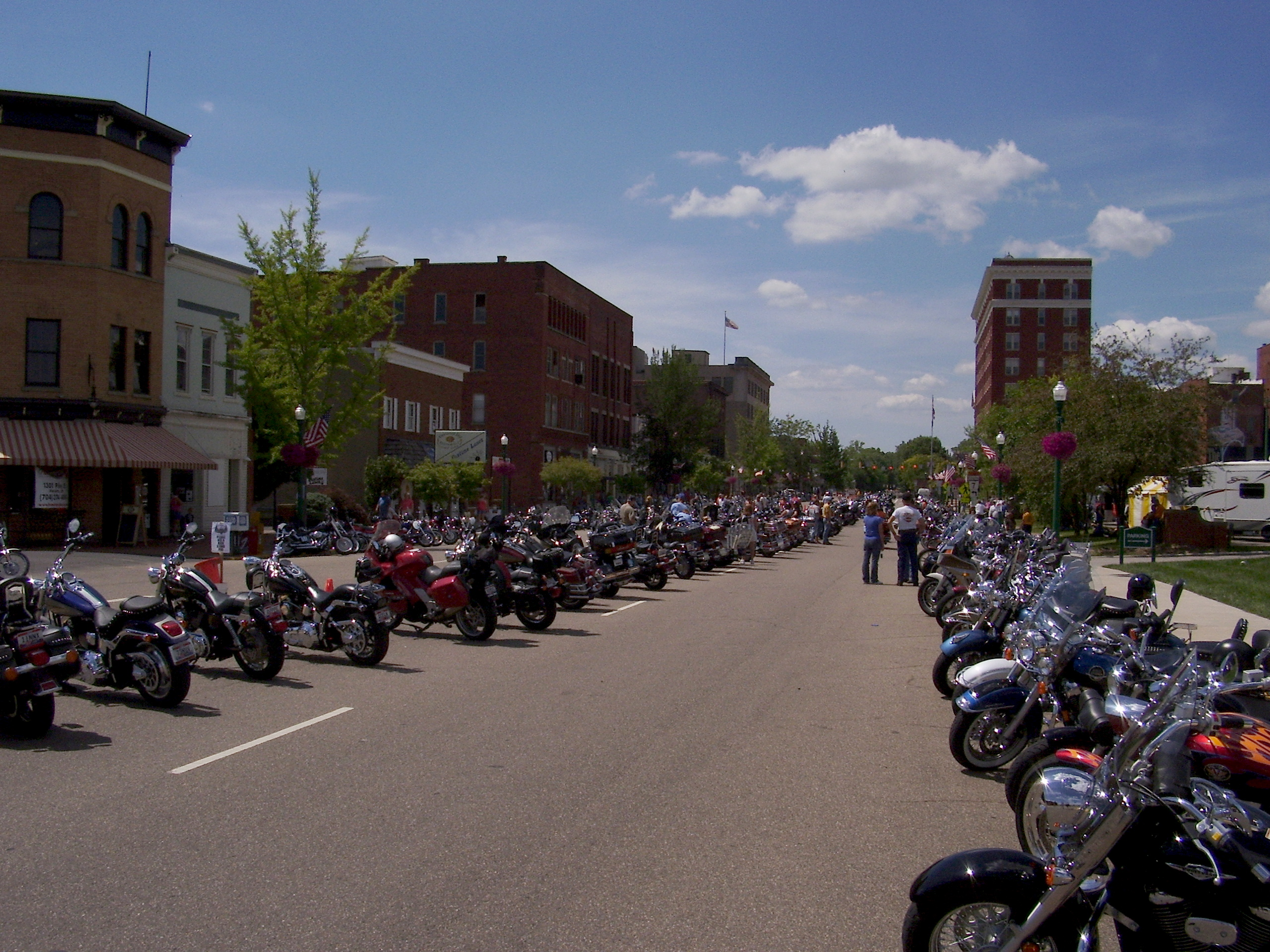
Street lined with motorcycles at a motorcycle rally in Marietta, Ohio.

Notable annual North American rallies include the Sturgis Motorcycle Rally, Laconia Motorcycle Week, Black Bike Week and Daytona Beach Bike Week, with each having thousands in attendance. The Republic of Texas Biker Rally is held each June in Austin, Texas and attracts over 200,000 bikers to the state capitol. There are innumerable smaller, regional rallies around the United States, including the annual BMW MOA international rally, the Oyster Run in the Pacific Northwest, the Golden Aspen Rally (formerly Aspencade) in the Southwest, the Route 66 Bike Week in the West, Americade in the Northeast, and Motorcycles on Meridian in the Midwest. A popular rally in the East takes place in the mountains of Maryland called Apple's East Coast Motorcycle Rally (formerly East Coast Sturgis).

Rallies will often incorporate entertainment such as a burnout pit, motorcycle contests, bike washes, motorcycle stunt performances like wheelie acts and the wall of death, live bands, and dice or poker runs. The Indianapolis and Daytona Beach motorcycle rallies have championship motorcycle racing at nearby circuits. In some cases, rallies are held as benefits for organizations or groups such as the American Red Cross, American Cancer Society, American Legion, or VFW.

Large rallies are associated with an increase in fatal traffic collisions and a rise in organ donations in the area where the rally is hosted.

== Europe ==
The oldest motorcycle rally in Europe is the Elefantentreffen (Elephant Rally) established in 1956 by former Wehrmacht motorcyclists and named in honour of the Zündapp motorcycle that was nicknamed the "green elephant". The growing reputation of the Elephant Rally led to the creation in 1962 of a British winter rally called the Dragon rally and is held each February in North Wales.

One of the largest motorcycle rallies in Europe is the Thundersprint, held annually in May in Northwich, Cheshire, England and usually has notable motorcycle champions or enthusiasts such as Giacomo Agostini and James May. Another large motorcycle rally is Glemseck 101. It takes place around the Glemseck at the Solitude Racetrack in Leonberg, Germany every first weekend in September. A special attraction are the 1/8 mile drag races, where customizers and motorcycle brands send their best bikes and bikers to the race (e.g. Triumph, BMW, Yamaha, Suzuki).

In the UK, the Iron Ore Rally is held annually in Egremont, Cumbria and the Rally of Discovery is held in Ireland. Rallies are held year round. Many motorcyclists (or bikers) prefer the winter rallies, such as the Mayflower MCCs Force Ten Rally or the Dean Vally MCCs Rallymans Rally. The usual order of the day is camping with a real ale tent and music. Rallies usually start on a Friday afternoon and finish at lunchtime on a Sunday. The point is to travel there by motorcycle, motorcycle and sidecar or trike (not cars or vans), meet friends from all over the country and sometimes further afield, claim a rally badge and enjoy the entertainment. Prizes are awarded for the furthest distance travelled, best bike, best rat bike, oldest person attending, youngest person attending, etc. There are usually planned ride-outs on the Saturday taking in good roads and sometimes historic sites, museums, etc.

In the UK, many people relate motorcycle rallies to the famous Bulldog Bash near Stratford-upon-Avon. This is a hugely popular event and attracts thousands of people including non-motorcyclists. There are many much smaller rallies that attract between 50 and 500 bikers to each event, organised and controlled by a host club. Rallies are still attended by motorcyclists that have been going to rallies for up to 40 or 50 years. In the UK motorcycle rallies began in earnest in the early 1960s as young, mainly working class men and women (usually on the pillion) gained freedom by motorcycle ownership and set off around the country camping. Some went in groups or clubs and thus the rally was born. Many were Ton-up boys, later Greasers and then Greebos.

== Gypsy tour ==
Gypsy tour is an American motorcycling term which originated before the 1920s; the term has been mostly but not entirely replaced by rally or run. Gypsy tours were organized where groups of riders all over the country converged on a favorite destination. The term gypsy was used because the riders would travel long distances and often sleeping in tents around a campfire along the way much like the Hollywood stereotype of Romani.

One Australian newspaper referring to a Gypsy Tour rally from Melbourne to Sydney in 1927, stated - "The idea of a "gypsy tour" originated in America. There these tours are usually being organised simultaneously in different cities and towns, and routes all converging on one centre, where a great rally is held by the touring parties". The term gypsy tour has been used for other activities, but predominantly motorcycle rallies, and the idea quickly spread around the world.

Many gypsy tours have been held over the years and are still a regular event for many vintage and modern motorcycle groups. The annual gypsy tour to Laconia, New Hampshire near Lake Winnipesaukee began in 1916 and is the oldest continuous motorcycle event in the U.S.

== Australia ==
A number of rallies are held throughout Australia throughout the year. These range from 'back to basics' rallies, usually held in remote locations with no facilities, to catered rallies held in country towns and other rural locations. Many rallies are held at a local recreation reserve, football ground, racecourse, or showground in country towns. These venues often have toilet/shower blocks, and bar/kitchen facilities. Often the motorcycle club organising the rally will arrange for a local service group like the Rotary club, or local sporting club to cater an evening meal and breakfast, and to run the bar. These events often provide much needed revenue sources for the communities in which the rallies are held, and the communities welcome the rallies to their towns.

Compared to European and American rallies, Australian rallies are often small affairs with attendance ranging from a few dozen to a few hundred bikes.

The Ulysses Club Annual General Meeting Event is a weeklong affair that brings in thousands of motorcyclists and millions of dollars to its host site, which can be different each year. The 2014 event in Alice Springs is expected to draw 5,000 to 7,000 participants.

== New Zealand ==
There are number of rallies held throughout New Zealand, most events taking place over the warmer months. There are a couple of cold weather rallies such as the Brass Monkey Motorcycle Rally.

== See also ==
- Biker bar
- Long-distance motorcycle riding
