= Results of the 2025 New Zealand territorial authority elections in Southland =

2025 New Zealand territorial authority elections (Southland)
- 11 October 2025
- Turnout: 31,731 (46.31% ▼5.38 pp)
- 3 of 3 local councils
Party	Councils	+/–
No majority	3	0
This lists parties that won seats. See the complete results below.
- 3 mayors and 35 local councillors
Party	Seats	+/–
Mayors
Independent	3	+2
Local councillors
Independent	35	+6
This lists parties that won seats. See the complete results below.

Elections for the territorial authorities of New Zealand were held from 9 September until 11 October 2025 as part of that year's nation-wide local elections. 709 local councillors and 66 mayors were elected across 66 of 67 councils.

3 territorial authorities are located in the Southland region. 3 mayors and 35 district and city councillors were elected. 1 of 3 mayors were re-elected and no group gained or held a majority on any council.

== Maps ==

Legend
Independent hold	Independent gain

== Summary ==
=== Overall ===
Council	Electoral system	Seats	Mayor	Councillors	Control	Turnout	Details	Refs
Southland	FPP	12	▌ Independent hold	▌ Independent 12 ( 0)	▌ No majority	8,744; 42.36% ▼5.79 pp	Details	
Gore	FPP	11	▌ Independent gain	▌ Independent 11 (▲2)	▌ No majority	4,991; 55.16% ▲1.79 pp	Details	
Invercargill	FPP	12	▌ Independent gain	▌ Independent 12 (▲4)	▌ No majority	17,996; 46.35% ▼6.84 pp	Details	
3 of 3 councils		35						

=== Mayors ===
Council	Incumbent	Elected	Runner-up	Details	Refs
Southland	Rob Scott (Ind)		Gary Tong (Ind)	Details	
Gore	Ben Bell (Ind)		Nicky Davis (Ind)	Details	
Invercargill	Nobby Clark^{R} (LGI)	Tom Campbell (Ind)	Alex Crackett (Ind)	Details	
^{R} did not run for re-election

=== Candidates ===
Party / ticket	Mayors				Councillors			
Party / ticket	2022	Candidates	Elected	+/−	2022	Candidates	Elected	+/−
Independent	1	13	3	▲2	29	57	35	▲6
Team Hokonui	1	0	0	▼1	2	0	0	▼2
LETS GO Invercargill	1	0	0	▼1	4	0	0	▼4
Seats:	3		3	0	35		35	0

== Southland District Council ==
2025 Southland District Council election
- 11 October 2025
- Turnout: 8,744 (42.36% ▼5.79 pp)
- Mayor
	Ind	Ind
Candidate	Rob Scott	Gary Tong
Party	Independent	Independent
Popular vote	6,734	1,418
Percentage	77.01%	16.22%
Mayor before election
Rob Scott
Independent
Elected mayor
Rob Scott
Independent
- Councillors
- 12 seats on the governing body of Southland District Council; 7 seats needed for a majority
Party	Seats	+/–
Independent	12	0
This lists parties that won seats. See the complete results below.

=== 2025 Southland mayoral election ===
2025 Southland mayoral election
Party	Candidate	Votes	%	±%
Independent	Rob Scott^{†}	6,734	77.01	+52.45
Independent	Gary Tong	1,418	16.22	−7.90
Independent	Wendy Joy Baker	465	5.32	+3.23
Informal votes		2	0.02	−0.18
Blank votes		123	1.41	+0.33
Turnout		8,744	42.36	−5.79
Registered electors		20,643		
Independent hold				
^{†} incumbent

=== Mararoa Waimea ward ===
2025 Mararoa Waimea ward election
Party	Candidate	Votes	%	±%
Independent	Sarah Greaney^{†}	elected unopposed		
Independent	Tom O'Brien^{†}	elected unopposed		
Independent	Matt Wilson^{†}	elected unopposed		
Registered electors		5,364		
Independent hold				
Independent hold				
Independent hold				
^{†} incumbent

=== Waiau Aparima ward ===
2025 Waiau Aparima ward election
Party	Candidate	Votes	%	±%
Independent	Don Byars^{†}	1,230	62.15	+28.60
Independent	Michael Weusten	1,177	59.47	(new)
Independent	Jaspreet Boparai^{†}	1,050	53.06	+19.31
Independent	Stevey Chernishov	419	21.17	(new)
Informal votes		0	0.00	−0.23
Blank votes		97	4.90	−0.41
Turnout		1,979	40.09	−7.99
Registered electors		4,936		
Independent hold				
Independent gain from Independent				
Independent hold				
^{†} incumbent

=== Ōreti ward ===
2025 Ōreti ward election
Party	Candidate	Votes	%	±%
Independent	Christine Menzies^{†}	1,937	73.54	+12.12
Independent	Brian Somerville	1,685	63.97	(new)
Independent	Phil Dobson	1,425	54.10	(new)
Independent	Katie Allan	895	33.98	−8.42
Informal votes		0	0.00	−0.15
Blank votes		72	2.73	+0.03
Turnout		2,634	44.10	−2.35
Registered electors		5,973		
Independent hold				
Independent gain from Independent				
Independent gain from Independent				
^{†} incumbent

=== Waihōpai Toetoe ward ===
2025 Waihōpai Toetoe ward election
Party	Candidate	Votes	%	±%
Independent	Paul Duffy^{†}	1,014	65.04	n/a
Independent	Julie Keast^{†}	833	53.43	n/a
Independent	Pamela Yorke	638	40.92	(new)
Independent	Phil Scothern	318	20.40	(new)
Informal votes		2	0.13	n/a
Blank votes		23	1.48	n/a
Turnout		1,559	38.74	n/a
Registered electors		4,024		
Independent hold				
Independent hold				
^{†} incumbent

=== Stewart Island/Rakiura ward ===
2025 Stewart Island/Rakiura ward election
Party	Candidate	Votes	%	±%
Independent	Jon Spraggon^{†}	elected unopposed		
Registered electors		346		
Independent hold				
^{†} incumbent

== Gore District Council ==
2025 Gore District Council election
- 11 October 2025
- Turnout: 4,991 (55.16% ▲1.79 pp)
- Mayor
	Ind	Ind
Candidate	Ben Bell	Nicky Davis
Party	Independent	Independent
Popular vote	3,392	1,508
Percentage	67.96%	30.21%
Mayor before election
Ben Bell
Team Hokonui
Elected mayor
Ben Bell
Independent
- Councillors
- 11 seats on the governing body of Gore District Council; 7 seats needed for a majority
Party	Seats	+/–
Independent	11	+2
This lists parties that won seats. See the complete results below.

=== 2025 Gore mayoral election ===
2025 Gore mayoral election
Party	Candidate	Votes	%	±%
Independent	Ben Bell^{†}	3,392	67.96	+19.16
Independent	Nicky Davis	1,508	30.21	(new)
Informal votes		1	0.02	+0.00
Blank votes		90	1.80	−0.55
Turnout		4,991	55.16	+1.79
Registered electors		9,049		
Independent gain from Team Hokonui				
^{†} incumbent

=== At-large ===
2025 Gore at-large election
Party	Candidate	Votes	%	±%
Independent	Torrone Smith	2,998	60.07	(new)
Independent	Neville Phillips	2,803	56.16	(new)
Independent	Joe Stringer^{†}	2,647	53.04	−1.83
Independent	Steven Boko Dixon	1,881	37.69	−0.12
Independent	Gary McIntyre	1,718	34.42	(new)
Informal votes		12	0.24	+0.18
Blank votes		152	3.05	−0.39
Turnout		4,991	55.16	+1.79
Registered electors		9,049		
Independent gain from Independent				
Independent gain from Independent				
Independent gain from Team Hokonui				
^{†} incumbent

=== Rural ward ===
2025 Gore rural ward election
Party	Candidate	Votes	%	±%
Independent	John Gardyne	elected unopposed		
Independent	Stewart MacDonell	elected unopposed		
Registered electors		2,275		
Independent win (new seat)				
Independent win (new seat)				

=== Mataura ward ===
2025 Mataura ward election
Party	Candidate	Votes	%	±%
Independent	Nicky Coats	elected unopposed		
Registered electors		1,095		
Independent gain from Independent				

=== Gore ward ===
2025 Gore ward election
Party	Candidate	Votes	%	±%
Independent	Melanie Cupit	2,215	69.44	(new)
Independent	Paul Neil McPhail^{†}	2,149	67.37	+10.34
Independent	Andy Fraser	1,998	62.63	(new)
Independent	Robert (Caveman) McKenzie^{†}	1,805	56.58	+7.80
Independent	Donna Bruce	1,387	43.48	(new)
Independent	Jess Hudson	1,015	31.82	(new)
Informal votes		1	0.03	+0.00
Blank votes		51	1.60	+0.59
Turnout		3,190	56.17	+3.09
Registered electors		5,679		
Independent gain from Independent				
Independent hold				
Independent gain from Independent				
Independent gain from Team Hokonui				
Independent gain from Independent				
^{†} incumbent

== Invercargill City Council ==
2025 Invercargill City Council election
- 11 October 2025
- Turnout: 17,996 (46.35% ▼6.84 pp)
- Mayor
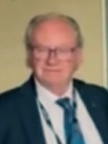
		Ind
Candidate	Tom Campbell	Alex Crackett
Party	Independent	Independent
Popular vote	6.948	5,202
Percentage	38.61%	28.91%
	Ind	Ind
Candidate	Ian Pottinger	Ria Bond
Party	Independent	Independent
Popular vote	2,322	1,803
Percentage	12.90%	10.02%
Mayor before election
Nobby Clark
Lets Go Invercargill
Elected mayor
Tom Campbell
Independent
- Councillors
- 12 seats on the governing body of Invercargill City Council; 7 seats needed for a majority
Party	Seats	+/–
Independents	12	+4
This lists parties that won seats. See the complete results below.
Control before	Control after
No majority	No majority

=== 2025 Invercargill mayoral election ===
2025 Invercargill mayoral election
Party	Candidate	Votes	%	±%
Independent	Tom Campbell	6,948	38.61	(new)
Independent	Alex Crackett	5,202	28.91	(new)
Independent	Ian Pottinger	2,322	12.90	(new)
Independent	Ria Bond	1,803	10.02	+5.44
Independent	Tom Morton	711	3.95	+2.41
Independent	Andrew Clark	291	1.62	(new)
Independent	Stevey Chernishov	229	1.27	+0.43
Independent	Gordon McCrone	66	0.37	(new)
Informal votes		75	0.42	+0.13
Blank votes		349	1.94	+0.87
Turnout		17,996	46.35	−6.84
Registered electors		38,829		
Independent gain from Lets Go Invercargill				

=== Invercargill at-large ===
2025 Invercargill at-large election
Party	Candidate	Votes	%	±%
Independent	Steve Broad^{†}	11,503	63.92	(new)
Independent	Alex Crackett^{†}	10,056	55.88	+24.49
Independent	Marcus Lush	8,396	46.65	(new)
Independent	Grant Dermody^{†}	8,321	46.24	+9.24
Independent	Trish Boyle^{†}	7,457	41.44	+8.94
Independent	Ria Bond^{†}	7,373	40.97	+6.51
Independent	Darren Ludlow^{†}	7,371	40.96	+2.52
Independent	Ian Pottinger	7,195	39.98	+2.89
Independent	Allan Arnold^{†}	6,105	33.92	−2.31
Independent	Andrea De Vries	5,920	32.90	(new)
Independent	Lisa Tou McNaughton	5,816	32.32	+6.08
Independent	Barry Stewart^{†}	5,710	31.73	+1.62
Independent	Ian Reeves	5,689	31.61	(new)
Independent	Lynley McKerrow	5,608	31.16	(new)
Independent	David Meades	5,414	30.08	(new)
Independent	Karl Herman	4,788	26.61	(new)
Independent	Terry King	4,691	26.07	−3.15
Independent	Chris Dawson	4,510	25.06	(new)
Independent	Jay Coote	4,137	22.99	(new)
Independent	Pania Coote	3,904	21.69	(new)
Independent	Tony Van Der Lem	3,749	20.83	(new)
Independent	Tom Morton	3,268	18.16	+5.82
Independent	Carl Heenan	2,979	16.55	(new)
Independent	Dan O'Connell	2,320	12.89	(new)
Independent	Amanda Laurie	2,128	11.82	(new)
Independent	Noel Peterson	1,301	7.23	+0.34
Independent	Carol (CJ) Jasperse	1,005	5.58	(new)
Informal votes		51	0.28	−0.14
Blank votes		132	0.73	−0.99
Turnout		17,996	46.35	−6.84
Registered electors		38,829		
Independent hold				
Independent hold				
Independent gain from Lets Go Invercargill				
Independent gain from Lets Go Invercargill				
Independent hold				
Independent hold				
Independent hold				
Independent hold				
Independent gain from Lets Go Invercargill				
Independent gain from Independent				
Independent gain from Independent				
Independent gain from Lets Go Invercargill				
^{†} incumbent

== See also ==
- 2025 Environment Southland election
