= Southern Waters =

Water services company in southern New Zealand

Southern Waters is a water services company in southern New Zealand that is jointly owned by four district councils: the Central Otago, Clutha, Gore and Waitaki District Councils. The entity received approval from the Department of Internal Affairs in October 2025 and is expected to take over management of drinking, wastewater and stormwater services in those districts from July 2027. Southern Waters was established under the framework of the Sixth National Government's Local Water Done Well programme. In April 2026, the Waitaki District Council joined the proposed water services entity after initially pulling out in July 2025.

== Leadership ==
Southern Waters's programme director is Fiona Smith, who had previously served as Executive Manager, Strategy and Performance at WaterNSW, a major Australian water utility provider. Board members include establishment chair Bruce Gemmell, directors Rob Hewitt, Fraser Jonker and Michael Sage.

== Background ==
In October 2024, Mayor of Central Otago Tamah Alley and Mayor of Gore Ben Bell urged local councils to develop a unified approach towards delivering local water services. The Central Otago District Council also contracted consultant company Morrison Low to develop a business case exploring regional delivery models including maintaining the status quo of running an in-house business unit, creating a specialised council-controlled organisation and a joint asset-owning entity in the Otago and Southland Regions. In early December, Alley and Bell announced that the Central Otago and Gore District Councils had agreed to work together to deliver water services.

In February 2025, the Timaru District Council considered joining the Southern Water Collective, a proposed joint water services council-controlled organisation (CCO) consisting of the Central Otago, Gore and Clutha District Councils. By late March 2025, Timaru instead decided to join the South Canterbury Water Collective. On 4 April, the Waitaki District Council met to consider joining the Southern Water Collective. On 7 April, the Waitaki Council endorsed the "Southern Water Done Well" partnership and sought public feedback from ratepayers.

On 9 July 2025, the Waitaki District Council voted by a majority to withdraw from the proposed Southern Water Done Well joint water services company in favour of managing its own water services. Mayor of Waitaki Gary Kircher and Cr Jim Hopkins were the only Waitaki councillors to support joining the joint council-control organisation. Public consultation across the four councils attracted 1,000 submissions; with 57.5% favouring maintaining in-house water services and 26.7% supporting the proposed joint CCO model. 54% of Waitaki respondents favoured their district council managing its own water services. By 15 July, the Central Otago, Clutha and Gore District Councils had voted to proceed with the Southern Water Done Well water services programme.

In late August 2025, Kircher claimed that the Waitaki District Council's decision to proceed with an alternative independent water plan would cause a 40 percent rise in rates. By contrast, the Waitaki Ratepayers and Residents Association chair Ray Henderson accepted that rate rises were inevitable but contended that a joint model would have created unnecessary administrative costs. On 28 August, the Waitaki District Council voted to continue providing water services in-house.

On 7 October 2025, the Department of Internal Affairs (DIA) approved the Southern Waters entity, which will assume responsibility of water services from July 2027. The following day, the DIA rejected the Waitaki District Council's standalone water services plan on the grounds its failed to meet regulatory requirements or include enough funding to cover the district's projected growth. On 21 October, Local Government Minister Simon Watts appointed a Crown facilitator to assist the Waitaki District Council with developing its own water services plan.

On 24 February 2026, the Waitaki District Council reapplied to rejoin the Southern Waters entity. Mayor of Waitaki Mel Tavendale said that joining the proposed regional water services entity would "deliver clear benefits in efficiency and cost savings." By 8 April, the Clutha, Gore and Central Otago District Councils had approved Waitaki's application to join the Southern Waters partnership.
