= Local Water Done Well =

New Zealand government policy

Local Water Done Well is the Sixth National Government's policy to address New Zealand's water infrastructural challenges. It is the successor to the previous Sixth Labour Government's controversial Three Waters programme. The policy focuses on local ownership and decision-making over the delivery of water services while meeting economic, environmental and water quality regulatory requirements.

Local Water Done Well consists of three laws repealing the previous Three Waters legislation; establishing the framework and preliminary arrangements for the new water services system; and establishing the endurance settings of the water services system. The repeal legislation passed on 14 February 2024 while a legislation establishing the framework of the council-owned new water services system passed into law on 28 August 2024. In mid August 2025, the Local Government (Water Services) Act 2025 and the associated Local Government (Water Services) (Repeals and Amendments) Act 2025 passed into law. These provide the legal framework for the Local Water Done Well programme.

== Background ==
As of December 2024, water services in New Zealand are provided by 64 local councils and council-controlled organisations (CCOs), three regional councils, three government departments and the New Zealand Defence Force. Key issues facing water service providers have included high operational and maintenance costs, chemical and E. coli contamination.

On 28 January 2020, the Minister of Local Government, Nanaia Mahuta, released Cabinet papers and minutes setting out intentions for reform of service delivery and funding arrangements for the three waters services nationwide. The Cabinet paper identified affordability and capability as two key challenges facing New Zealand's three waters service delivery infrastructure. The paper proposed transferring control and administration of three waters provision services from local councils to a new entity that would focus on the provision of water services. The Government indicated that it would work with local government bodies to explore options for transitioning councils to new service delivery arrangements and investigate opportunities for collaborative approaches to water service delivery.

On 27 October 2021, Mahuta confirmed that the Government would proceed with its "Three Waters reform programme" to transfer management of storm water, drinking water and wastewater to four new entities by July 2024. Under a co-governance structure, these entities would be managed by independent boards jointly elected by a group set up by councils and Māori iwi (tribes). These proposed reforms were criticised by several local council leaders including Mayor of Auckland Phil Goff, Mayor of Christchurch Lianne Dalziel, Mayor of Wellington Andy Foster, and the opposition National and ACT parties. By contrast, Ngāi Tahu's Te Maire Tau, the co-chair of Te Kura Taka Pini (the tribe's freshwater group), welcomed the Three Water reforms, saying they would improve water services and environmental outcomes.

From November 2021, a working group of mayors and Māori representatives reviewed issues of representation, governance and accountability, and reported back in March 2022 with 47 recommendations. In April 2022, the government accepted 44 of the recommendations. Key changes to the original proposals included providing shareholdings for councils in the four new water entities, and increased legislative protection against future privatisation of the water assets. The Water Services Entities Act 2022 was passed in December 2022.

In mid-April 2023, the Labour Government announced a major overhaul of its Three Waters reform programme, renaming it the Water Services Reform Programme. The proposed four water services entities were expanded into ten entities but would retain the same split co-governance structure consisting of representatives of local councils and mana whenua representatives. On 16 August 2023, Parliament passed the Water Services Entities Amendment Act, which implemented these changes into law but delayed the creation of the water services entities until 2026. On 23 August 2023, Parliament passed two further Three Waters bills into law: the Water Services Economic Efficiency and Consumer Protection Act 2023 and Water Services Legislation Act 2023. The third bill gave the Commerce Commission oversight over the water services entities' quality and efficiency while the fourth bill outlined the duties, functions and powers of the proposed water services entities.

While in opposition, the National Party campaigned on repealing Labour's Three Waters reforms and introducing its own "Local Water Done Well" policy. Under this plan, local councils would retain control over drinking water, stormwater and wastewater albeit with stronger government oversight, stricter water quality standards, and a requirement for councils to investment in the maintenance and replacement of water infrastructure. During the 2023 New Zealand general election held on 14 October 2023, Labour lost its parliamentary majority with Prime Minister Chris Hipkins conceding defeat. The National Party led by Christopher Luxon subsequently formed a coalition government with the support of ACT and New Zealand First. The National-led coalition government identified repealing the Three Waters reforms as part of its 100-day plan.

== Launch and legislative framework ==
The Local Water Done Well policy consists of three stages: repealing the previous Labour Government's Three Waters legislation; passing the Local Government (Water Services Preliminary Arrangements) Act 2024 to establish the framework and preliminary arrangements for the new water services system; and passing the Local Government (Water Services) Bill to establish the endurance settings, structural and operational arrangements, and regulatory backstop powers for the new water services system.

On 12 February 2024, Transport Minister Simeon Brown announced that the Government would create a "Technical Advisory Group" (TAG) to develop two "Local Water Done Well" laws by mid-2025 that would allow local councils to voluntarily establish their own water management groupings and council-controlled organisations along the lines of Wellington Water and Auckland's Watercare Services. The Technical Advisory Group's membership consisted of Castalia Limited's managing director Andreas Heuser (chair), New Zealand Infrastructure Commission director and former Watercare chief executive Raveen Jaduram, Porirua City Council chief executive Wendy Walker, Chapman Tripp partner Mark Reese, and Whangārei District Council chief executive Simon Weston. On 23 August, the New Zealand Treasury released its regulatory impact statement on the Local Waters Done Well legislation. It expressed concerned that the New Zealand Government had "limited consultation and engagement" with key stakeholders on the development of its policies including water services sector organisations, local councils, Māori iwi (tribes) and hapū (subgroups) and other interest groups. Treasury officials warned that inadequate consultation would affect the development and implementation of water policies.

=== Water Services Acts Repeal Act 2024 ===
On 14 February 2024, the Sixth National Government passed the Water Services Acts Repeal Act 2024 which repealed Labour's Three Waters programme under urgency. The repeal legislation was supported by National, ACT and New Zealand First but was opposed by the opposition Labour, the Green parties and Te Pāti Māori. The Government also unveiled details of the Local Water Done Well policy, reiterating it would maintain local councils' ownership of water assets.

=== Local Government (Water Services Preliminary Arrangements) Act 2024 ===
On 8 August 2024, Brown announced that council-controlled organisations would be able to borrow money for water infrastructure from the Local Government Funding Agency. The Government also introduced its first Local Water Done Well bill, the Local Government (Water Services Preliminary Arrangements) Act 2024. Under the legislation, local councils would have a year to develop plans for funding water, wastewater and stormwater services that they need and ensuring their financial sustainability. On 28 August, this bill passed its third reading in Parliament. Under the new legislation, water services regulator Taumata Arowai no longer has to consider Te Mana o te Wai and National Policy Statement for Freshwater Management when setting their wastewater standards. The bill was supported by the governing coalition parties but was opposed by the opposition Labour, Green and Māori parties. It received royal assent on 2 September 2024.

Under the Local Government (Water Services Preliminary Arrangements) Act 2024 (Act), all local councils need to produce a Water Service Delivery Plan (WSDP) to deliver "financially sustainable" water services by September 2025. A WSDP can be developed by either a local council or in collaboration with other councils. Water services can either be provided by a council-controlled organisation (CCO) or through a joint arrangement. The Commerce Commission will "economically regulate" the local councils through information disclosure requirements.

=== Local Government (Water Services) Act 2025 ===
On 17 December 2024, the Local Government (Water Services) Bill passed its first reading. The bill proposes a new framework for water services delivery; gives the Commerce Commission economic regulatory and consumer protection powers over water services; and changes to the water quality regulatory framework and Taumata Arowai (Water Services Authority). The Bill was referred to the Finance and Expenditure Committee, with public submissions on the legislation being held until 23 February 2025.

Other key provisions of the Local Government (Water Services) Bill include designating income generated by water organisations as tax exempt under the Income Tax Act 2007; creating a new framework for water service bylaws and their enforcement under the Local Government Act 2002; streamlining the process for accessing land for water services to match those for other utility providers; amends the Water Services Act 2021 and Resource Management Act 1991 to introduce national standards for wastewater and stormwater; and repeals references to the Treaty of Waitangi in the Water Services Act 2021 and Taumata Arowai – the Water Services Regulator Act 2020 in favour of consulting Māori perspectives.

On 19 August, the Local Government (Water Services) Bill passed its third reading, becoming law. That same day, the Government passed the Local Government (Water Services) (Repeals and Amendments) Bill. Together, these two laws provide the framework for local councils to manage drinking water, waste water and stormwater services. These bills were supported by the National, ACT and NZ First parties but were opposed by the Labour, Green and Māori parties. The Local Government (Water Services) (Repeals and Amendments) Bill had previously been part of the Local Government (Water Services) Bill but was separated during the Committee of the Whole House stage on 13 August.

== Implementation ==
=== 2024 ===
In early May Mayor of Auckland Wayne Brown and Simeon Brown jointly announced that Auckland would avoid a 25.8 percent rates increase as part of the Government's Local Water Done Well plan.

In May, the Wellington City Council (WCC) reached a memorandum of understanding with nine other councils in the Wellington Region to work together on exploring the creation of a regional water services organisation. By 11 December 2024, the various Wellington local councils had developed three options in consultation with elected members and local iwi (Māori tribes). The first option was a regional three-waters council-controlled organisation (CCO) working in conjunction with the Upper Hutt City, Hutt City, Porirua City and Greater Wellington Regional Councils. The second option was a WCC-run council controlled organisation while the third option was to continue the status quo of the WCC allowing outside contractors to manage its water assets and services.

In October, Mayor of Central Otago Tamah Alley and Mayor of Gore Ben Bell urged local councils to develop a unified approach towards delivering local water services. The Central Otago District Council also contracted consultant company Morrison Low to develop a business case exploring regional delivery models including maintaining the status quo of running an in-house business unit, creating a specialised council-controlled organisation and a joint asset-owning entity in the Otago and Southland Regions. In early December, Alley and Bell announced that Central Otago and Gore District Councils had agreed to work together to deliver water services.

By 10 December, Tauranga City Council had developed an indicative business case exploring options for delivering water services including creating a council-controlled organisation either alone or in coordination with another council.

By mid-December, Newsroom reported that many local councils were exploring options for providing water services while managing costs and chemical and E. coli contamination issues. Several councils have proposed creating their own water CCOs while others have proposed working with other councils to provide water services. Notable councils opting to provide their own water services have included the Ashburton District Council, the Auckland Council, Christchurch and Invercargill City Councils. Councils considering merging their water services with other councils have included the Nelson, Tasman, the Ruapehu, the Rangitīkei, Whanganui, the Horowhenua, Kapiti, Palmerston North and Manawatū, Central Otago, Waitaki, Gore and Clutha councils.

=== 2025 ===
On 11 February, the Hamilton City Council expressed concerns that the Government's Local Government Water Services Bill would override Treaty of Waitangi settlement obligations and would make it harder to protect the Waikato river. In mid-February 2025, the Christchurch City Council released its interim business case, which came up with three proposals. These included retaining an in-house delivery model, creating a council-controlled organisation or a council-controlled organisation managing water supply and waste water.

On 31 March, the Invercargill City Council sought public feedback on three options for delivering water services: establishing an in-house "council-operated enhanced service," establishing an Invercargill council-controlled organisation and creating a Southland-wide CCO. On 5 April, the Southland District Council sought feedback on two proposals: continuing to provide in-house water services and creating a CCO to deliver water services.

In February, the Timaru District Council considered joining the Southern Water Collective, a proposed joint water services council-controlled organisation (CCO) consisting of the Central Otago, Gore and Clutha District Councils. By late March 2025, Timaru instead decided to join the South Canterbury Water Collective.

On 4 April, the Waitaki District Council met to consider joining the Southern Water Collective, a proposed joint water services council-controlled organisation (CCO) consisting of the Central Otago, Gore and Clutha District Councils. On 7 April, the Waitaki Council endorsed the "Southern Water Done Well" joint CCO partnership with Central Otago, Gore and Clutha. The Council subsequently sought public feedback on the proposed partnership.

On 1 May, the Hastings District Council released three proposals: a regional council-controlled water services organisation owned by the Hastings, Napier, Wairoa and Central Hawke's Bay District Councils, a council-owned water services CCO, and retaining in-house control of water services via a new business unit. On 7 May, the Christchurch City Council voted to retain in-house control of its drinking water, wastewater and stormwater services.

On 26 May, the Dunedin City Council unanimously voted to continue with its in-house model of delivering water services. Two thirds of public submissions favoured the "in-house" model.

On 29 May, Queenstown-Lakes District Council voted by a margin of 8–2 to establish a council-controlled organisation to deliver water services in the district. The council announced plans to seek consultation from constituents before progressing with the plan. Following a full council meeting on 31 July 2025, the Queenstown-Lakes Council decided to proceed with establishing a council-controlled organisation. The Queenstown Council confirmed its decision in late August 2025.

In June, the Palmerston North City Council voted to partner with the Horowhenua and Rangitīkei District Councils to create a new regional water services entity. While the Whanganui and Ruapehu District Councils were invited to join, the two opted to form a separate water services entity. That same month, the Rotorua Lakes Council confirmed that it would continue with in-house water services until transitioning to a regional council-controlled organisation in July 2028, subject to a final decision by the Lakes Council in 2027.

On 30 June, the Upper Hutt, Porirua, Lower Hutt, Wellington City Councils and the Greater Wellington Regional Council announced that the council-controlled organisation Wellington Water would be replaced by a new water services entity that would own and manage the various councils' water infrastructure. The new entity would generate its own income independent of council funding and manage its own debts. This new entity is expected to come into existence on 1 July 2026.

On 8 July, the Selwyn District Council became the first district council in the country to establish a council-controlled organisation called Selwyn Water for the purpose of managing its water and waste water infrastructure. Selwyn Water was set up at a cost of NZ$2 million under the Government's Local Water Done Well programme. Mayor of Selwyn Sam Broughton along with Minister of Local Government Simon Watts and Member of Parliament for Selwyn Nicola Grigg attended the inaugural event at Pines Wastewater Treatment Plant.

On 9 July, the Waitaki District Council voted by a majority to withdraw from the proposed Southern Water Done Well joint water services company in favour of managing its own water services. Mayor of Waitaki Gary Kircher and Cr Jim Hopkins were the only Waitaki councillors to support joining the joint council-control organisation. Other councils involved in the Southern Water Done Well included the Clutha, Central Otago and Gore District Councils. Public consultation across the four councils attracted 1,000 submissions; with 57.5% favouring maintaining in-house water services and 26.7% supporting the proposed joint CCO model. 54% of Waitaki respondents favoured their district council managing its own water services. By 15 July, the Central Otago, Clutha and Gore District Councils had voted to proceed with the Southern Water Done Well water services programme. In late August 2025, Kircher claimed that the Waitaki District Council's decision to proceed with an alternative independent water plan would cause a 40 percent rise in rates. By contrast, the Waitaki Ratepayers and Residents Association chair Ray Henderson accepted that rate rises were inevitable but contended that a joint model would have created unnecessary administrative costs.

On 31 July, seven Waikato district councils–the Hauraki, Matamata Piako, Ōtorohanga, South Waikato, Waipā, Waitomo and Taupō District Council–signed a shareholders' agreement to incorporate Waikato Waters as a joint council-controlled organisation. The new entity was described as the largest water council-controlled organisation in New Zealand. An establishment board was expected to be established by August 2026.

On 14 August, the Rangitīkei District Council unanimously voted to proceed with plans to established a regional water services council-controlled organisation in partnership with the Horowhenua District and Palmerston North City Councils. On 28 August, the Timaru District Council formally decided to establish a council-controlled organisation with the option of joining other regional water council-controlled organisations. That same day, the Waitaki District Council voted to continue water services in-house.

The deadline for district councils to submit their water service delivery plans was 3 September 2025. On 4 September, RNZ reported that the Thames-Coromandel District Council's plan to join a regional water services entity consisting of Tauranga and the Western Bay of Plenty had collapsed due to unresolved matters with iwi members of the Tauranga City Council and the Western Bay of Plenty District Council. The Deputy Mayor of Thames-Coromandel Terry Walker said that his council's preferred option was to join the regional water services entity and sought assistance from the New Zealand Government and Crown in mediating the dispute.

On 7 October, the Department of Internal Affairs (DIA) approved the Central Otago, Clutha and Gore district councils' plan to create the Southern Waters entity, which will assume responsibility of water services from July 2027. On 8 October, the DIA rejected the Waitaki District Council's standalone water services plan on the grounds its failed to meet regulatory requirements or include enough funding to cover the district's projected growth. On 21 October, Watts appointed a Crown facilitator to assist the Waitaki District Council with its water services plan.

On 11 November, the Rangitīkei District, Horowhenua District and Palmerston North City Councils confirmed plans to establish a new joint water services council-controlled organisation called Central Districts Water. In mid December, Central Districts Water released details about its governance framework, which consisted of a shareholder committee representing the three councils. Each council would have three representatives on the shareholder committee consisting of an elected member, an appointed member (likely another elected member) and a mana whenua representative nominated through Ngā Tapuwae o Hau (the iwi) entity representing local Māori residing within the three districts. The three councils signed the foundation agreements enabling the transfer of three water services to Central districts Water from July 2027.

On 11 December, Local Government Minister Watts confirmed that water service and infrastructure plans made under the Government's Local Water Done Well scheme had cost a total of NZ$49.7 billion, nearly NZ$9 billion higher than the councils' previous long-term plans due to the inclusion of capital investment to meet government compliance policies. He also confirmed that 44 councils had handed control of their water services to separate companies while 23 had opted to retain in-house services. 19 council-controlled organisations were also established, with 38 councils combining their services to form 12 council-controlled organisations and seven establishing their own council-controlled organisations.

=== 2026 ===
In early February 2026, Radio New Zealand reported that a new water services entity called Tiaki Wai would be launched in the Wellington Region on 1 July 2026. Tiaki Wai replaces Wellington Water and will be responsible for providing drinking water, wastewater and stormwater services in that region. The entity will be jointly owned by five local government bodies: the Wellington City Council, Porirua City Council, Hutt City Council, Upper Hutt City Council and the Greater Wellington Regional Council. Under this arrangement, Wellington regional ratepayers will be expected to pay two sets of water bills.

On 16 February, former deputy pro-vice chancellor of Massey University Chris Gallavin was appointed as the chair of the Central Districts Water's shareholding committee. As the non-voting independent chair, Gallavin was tasked with serving as a liaison between the councils, iwi and the water services entity.

On 24 February, the Waitaki District Council reapplied to rejoin the Southern Waters partnership. Mayor of Waitaki Mel Tavendale said that joining the proposed regional water services entity would "deliver clear benefits in efficiency and cost savings."

On 27 February, the Commerce Commission's new disclosure rules for councils and water service entities on spending expenditure for water supplies, water rates and future water infrastructural plans came into effect.

On 17 March, Central Districts Water's shareholding committee approved the appointment of the proposed water services entity's governing board, which consisted of Chair Steve Maharey, Dave Chambers, Jon Nichols, Linda Robertson, Pahia Turia and Sue Bidrose.

By 8 April, the Clutha, Gore and Central Otago District Councils had approved Waitaki's application to join the Southern Waters partnership.

On 28 June, former Palmerston North City Council deputy chief executive Chris Dyhrberg was appointed as the foundation chief executive of Central Districts Water. He will assume full powers on 1 July 2027.

On 27 August, the Palmerston North, Horowhenua, and Rangītikei District Councils and the Nga Tapūwae o Hau iwi entity released their statement of expectations for Central Districts Water.

In early September 2026, the Queenstown Lakes District Council confirmed that a council-controlled water services company called Alpine Waters (previously 3Waters Ltd) would assume responsibility for three waters services from 1 July 2027.

On 30 September, Tāheke – Bay Waters Limited was confirmed as the name of a joint water services company in the Bay of Plenty region operated by the Western Bay of Plenty District Council and Tauranga City Council. The entity's name was selected following consultation between water services staff from both district councils, tangata whenua representatives, Māori language experts and Joint Committee representatives. Bay Waters is expected to assume operational responsibility for three water services in the Western Bay of Plenty and Tauranga from 1 July 2027.

In October 2026, Whanganui District Council chief executive Doug told councillors that recruitment of a governing board for a new council-owned water services entity servicing the Whanganui and Ruapehu Districts would commence before Christmas 2026. The joint Whanganui-Raupehu entity is expected to begin operating from 1 July 2027.

In November 2026, the Whakatāne District Council sought public feedback on whether to continue providing water services in-house or create a council-owned water services entity. Mayor of Whakatāne Nandor Tanczos argued that a specialised water services entity would save ratepayers $1.4 million over an eight-year period. While the Council had initially proposed a joint regional water services entity that would include the Rotorua Lakes, Kawerau and Ōpōtiki District Councils, the other councils were not interested in Whakatāne's proposal. On 16 November, Central Districts Water appointed three new executive team members: General Manager of Operations Mike Monaghan, General Manager Planning and Construction John Humphrey, and General Manager Finance and Corporate Les Montgomery.
