= List of by-elections to the Invercargill City Council =

By-elections to the Invercargill City Council occur to fill vacant seats in the City Council. The death, resignation, bankruptcy or expulsion of a sitting councillor can cause a by-election to occur. The most recent by-election in Invercargill was in 2023 triggered by the resignation of councillor Nigel Skelt.

There have also been four mayoral by-elections in 1887, 1938, 1942 and 1993.

== List of by-elections ==
=== 1912 by-election ===
William Benjamin Scandrett resigned from the council upon being elected mayor. The resulting by-election was won by Tom O'Byrne.

1912 Invercargill Borough Council by-election
Party	Candidate	Votes	%	±%
Labour	Tom O'Byrne	769	39.65	
Independent	Hugh Mair	545	28.10	
Independent	Robert Barbour McKay	443	22.84	
Independent	Andrew McCulloch	171	8.81	
Informal votes		11	0.56	
Majority		224	11.55	
Turnout		1,939		

=== 1913 by-election ===
In 1913 Councillor Robert Galbraith resigned after moving residence to Ashburton.

1913 Invercargill Borough Council by-election
Party	Candidate	Votes	%	±%
Independent	John Thomas Carswell	890	39.01	
Independent	Isaac Petrie	882	38.66	
United Labour	Alexander Glass	485	21.26	
Informal votes		24	1.05	
Majority		8	0.35	
Turnout		2,281		

=== 1916 by-elections ===
Councillor John Archer resigned to move to Wellington. Edward Sheehan won the by-election on 19 January but was forced to resign due to a contract he neglected to surrender prior to being nominated. He was again elected on 23 February.

January 1916 Invercargill Borough Council by-election
Party	Candidate	Votes	%	±%
Independent	Edward Sheehan	558	46.34	
Labour	John Winders	330	27.40	
Independent Labour	John Charles Mackley	316	26.24	
Informal votes		28	2.32	
Majority		228	18.93	
Turnout		1,204		

February 1916 Invercargill Borough Council by-election
Party	Candidate	Votes	%	±%
Independent	Edward Sheehan	547	39.46	−6.88
Independent	William Smith	360	25.97	
Labour	John Winders	315	22.72	−4.68
Independent Labour	Jacob Alsweiler	106	7.64	
Independent	Thomas Harrington	58	4.18	
Informal votes		9	0.64	−1.68
Majority		187	13.49	−5.44
Turnout		1,386		

=== 1920 by-election ===
William Baird's seat on the council lapsed in 1920 triggering a by-election.

1920 Invercargill Borough Council by-election
Party	Candidate	Votes	%	±%
Independent	Frederick George Blake	386	73.66	
Independent Labour	Jacob Alsweiler	135	25.76	
Informal votes		3	0.57	
Majority		251	47.90	
Turnout		524	5.87	

=== 1927 by-election ===
Councillor Arthur Geddes resigned due to poor health. The by-election was contested by former councillors Alexander Glass and Tom O'Byrne.

1927 Invercargill Borough Council by-election
Party	Candidate	Votes	%	±%
Labour	Tom O'Byrne	1,323	53.15	
Independent	Alexander Glass	1,159	46.56	
Informal votes		7	0.28	
Majority		164	6.58	
Turnout		2,489		

=== 1932 by-election ===
Councillor Edward Sheehan died on 21 June 1932. The resulting by-election was won by William Denham on 18 July.

1932 Invercargill City Council by-election
Party	Candidate	Votes	%	±%
Labour	William Denham	2,023	55.12	
Independent	William Rous Mabson	1,637	44.60	
Informal votes		10	0.27	
Majority		386	10.51	
Turnout		3,670		

=== 1938 by-election ===
1938 Invercargill City Council by-election
Party	Candidate	Votes	%	±%
Labour	Richard Thomas Parsons	1,011	30.28	
Independent	William John Thomas	1,003	30.04	
Independent	Albert Errol Crimp	956	28.63	
Independent Labour	D W Stalker	368	11.02	
Majority		8	0.24	
Turnout		3,338		

=== 1939 by-election ===
First term councillor Alfred McCarthy resigned after being appointed as Judge of the Native Land Court for the Cook Islands in February 1939.

1939 Invercargill City Council by-election
Party	Candidate	Votes	%	±%
Independent	William John Thomas	2,178	63.02	
Labour	Maurice William Grantham	1,275	36.89	
Informal votes		3	0.08	
Majority		903	26.12	
Turnout		3,456		

=== 1949 by-election ===
Councillor John Pickard died on 10 January 1949, prompting a by-election which was won by George Agnew. Councillor Agnew would later die suddenly during a council meeting that November. The council opted to fill the seat via an appointment rather than hold another by-election.

1949 Invercargill City Council by-election
Party	Candidate	Votes	%	±%
Independent	George Agnew	965	23.56	
Independent	Alan Herbert James Wyatt	752	18.36	
Independent	Sandy Jordan	596	14.55	
Independent	Albert Errol Crimp	502	12.25	
Independent	George William Adamson	419	10.23	
Independent	William Liddy Boyd	356	8.69	
Independent	Brian Vincent Liston Beadle	324	7.91	
Independent	John Charles Waters	233	5.68	
Independent	Thomas Philip Hackett	49	1.19	
Independent	James Millar Markey	32	0.78	
Informal votes		65	1.58	
Majority		213	5.20	
Turnout		4,095	22.75	

=== 1976 by-election ===
Councillor Norman Jones resigned after being elected to parliament, prompting a by-election. Jones was replaced on the council by J. B. Munro, whom he defeated at the parliamentary election. There was also another vacancy so the election was for two seats.

1976 Invercargill City Council by-election
Party	Candidate	Votes	%	±%
Labour	J. B. Munro	4,299	65.09	
Independent	Jim Fenton	1,969	29.81	
Independent	Ivall Moira Macdonald	1,400	21.19	
Values	Malcolm Blair	1,310	19.83	
Independent	Tom Brass	1,102	16.68	
Independent	Walter McGregor Watson	886	13.41	
Independent	Mervyn Charles Thomas Hughes	650	9.84	
Independent	Alan Francis King	492	7.45	
Independent	Rex Hawthorne	427	6.46	
Independent	Neville Green	351	5.31	
Independent	Ralph Thomas Webb	284	4.30	
Informal votes		39	0.59	
Majority		569	8.61	
Turnout		6,604	18.00	

=== 2006 by-election ===
The 2006 by-election was triggered by the resignation of councillor David Carter due to ill health.

2006 Invercargill City Council by-election
Party	Candidate	Votes	%	±%
Labour	Wayne Harpur	4,609	29.55	
Independent	Thelma Buck	3,935	25.23	
Independent	Anne McCracken	3,096	19.85	
Independent	Maree Wilks	1,995	12.79	
Independent	Karl Barkley	1,905	12.21	
Informal votes		56	0.35	
Majority		674	4.32	
Turnout		15,596		

=== 2012 by-election ===
The 2012 by-election was triggered following the resignation of Jackie Kruger.

2012 Invercargill City Council by-election
Party	Candidate	Votes	%	±%
Independent	Lindsay Thomas	2,845	20.60	
Independent	Karen Arnold	2,492	18.04	
Independent	Steve Broad	2,453	17.76	
Independent	Allan Arnold	1,890	13.68	
Independent	Debbie Jamieson	1,344	9.73	
Independent	Becs Amundsen	872	6.31	
Independent	Hunter Andrews	808	5.85	
Independent	Carl Heenan	702	5.08	
Independent	Charlie Te Au	314	2.27	
Majority		353	2.55	
Turnout		13,810		

=== 2021 by-election ===
The 2021 by-election was prompted by the resignation of deputy mayor Toni Biddle in October 2020. On 17 February 2021, broadcaster Marcus Lush was declared to have won in a landslide.

2021 Invercargill City Council by-election
Party	Candidate	Votes	%	±%
Independent	Marcus Lush	7,371	50.14	
Independent	Wayne Harpur	1,534	10.43	
Independent	Simon Edwards	1,134	7.71	
Independent	Kevin Mulrooney	1,115	7.58	
Independent	Tom Downey	1,028	6.99	
Independent	David Pottinger	975	6.63	
Independent	Wade Devine	894	6.08	
Independent	Carl Heenan	432	2.93	
Independent	Bernadine Goldsmith	146	0.99	
Informal votes		71	0.48	
Majority		5,837	39.70	
Turnout		14,700	36.58	

=== 2023 by-election ===
On the night of 4 May 2023, Invercargill City councillor Nigel Skelt resigned from his position after fellow councillor Ria Bond threatened to resign if Skelt did not resign following allegations of sexual harassment. On 2 May 2023, Radio New Zealand reported that a female teenage employee at the ILT Stadium Southland had resigned on 17 February 2023 in response to Skelt's remarks about her physical appearance, naked jelly wrestling, and sexual reproduction. The former employee said she was upset by Skelt's remarks and no longer wanted to work alongside Skelt. At the time, Skelt was working as a stadium manager at ILT Stadium Southland. Radio New Zealand also reported that the Mayor of Invercargill Nobby Clark tried to defuse the situation by paying the teenage employee's NZ$3,000 in lost income, offering the employee counseling and work, issuing a warning to Skelt, and negotiating a confidentiality agreement with the employee. The young woman's parent criticised Clark in a letter for allegedly prioritising Skelt and the stadium's reputation over the hurt and damage experienced by the employee. The incident became public knowledge following a Local Government Official Information Meeting Act media request filed on 29 March 2023.

Bond welcomed Skelt's decision to resign, stating that "no person should be forced to work with someone who has done the things that he's done." The Invercargill City Council stated that Skelt's resignation would trigger a by-election, which was expected to cost approximately NZ$120,000. Invercargill's last by-election was held in 2020–2021 in response to Toni Biddle's resignation. The by-election campaign launch began on 1 July 2023. The Holy Trinity Church hosted a campaign launch meeting that was attended by seven candidates and 20 members of the public. The campaign launch covered several topics including the Three Waters reform programme, soup kitchens, Invercargill's Splash Palace changing room policy and Mayor Clark's participation in Julian Batchelor's controversial "Stop Co-Governance" meeting. A further ten meetings were scheduled to be held in Invercargill before voting commences on 13 July.

2023 Invercargill City Council by-election
Party	Candidate	Votes	%	±%
Independent	Steve Broad	2,792	20.93	
Independent	David Meades	1,589	11.91	
Independent	Lisa Tou-McNaughton	1,559	11.69	
Independent	Graham Lewis	1,524	11.42	
Independent	Asha Dutt	1,505	11.28	
Independent	Ian Reeves	888	6.65	
Independent	David Pottinger	678	5.08	
Independent	Sebastien Fabre	652	4.88	
Independent	Terry King	507	3.80	
Independent	Andrea Murrell	460	3.44	
Independent	David Hicks	363	2.72	
Independent	Carl Heenan	362	2.71	
Independent	Rob Te Maiharoa	324	2.42	
Independent	Tom Morton	71	0.53	
Informal votes		61	0.45	
Majority		1,203	9.02	
Turnout		13,335	34.48	
