= 2025 Environment Southland election =

Local election in New Zealand

- 11 October 2025
- Turnout: 20,808 (46.1%)
- Council election
- 12 seats of Environment Southland; 7 seats needed for a majority
Party	Seats	+/–
Independents	12	
This lists parties that won seats. See the complete results below.

The 2025 Environment Southland election was a local election held between 9 September and 11 October 2025 in the Southland Region of New Zealand, as part of that year's regional council elections and other local elections held nation-wide.

Voters elected 12 regional councillors for the 2025–2028 term of Environment Southland (the Southland Regional Council). Postal voting and first-past-the-post voting were used.

== Key dates ==
- 4 July 2025: Nominations for candidates opened.
- 1 August 2025: Nominations for candidates closed at 12pm. Updates to the preliminary electoral roll closed at 5pm.
- 9 September 2025: Voting documents were posted and voting opened.
- 11 October 2025: Voting closed at 12pm and preliminary results released.
- 16-22 October 2025: Declaration of final results.
- October/November 2025: Swearing-in ceremonies for elected members.

== Background ==
Local body elections are held in New Zealand every three years. The last Southland Regional Council election was held in 2022, with 18 nominations for 12 vacancies. Elections were held in all but one ward.

By 1 August 2025, Environment Southland had received 18 nominations for 12 positions. Since the five candidates for the Fiordland, Eastern-Dome, Western and Southern regional constituencies are standing unopposed, elections will only be required for the Hokonui and Invercargill-Rakiura constituencies.

Other local body elections were also held for the Invercargill City Council, the Gore District Council, the Southland District Council, the Invercargill Licensing Trust and the Mataura Licensing Trust.

== List of candidates ==
=== Incumbents not seeking re-election ===
- Environment Southland chairman Cr Nicol Horrell of the Western regional constituency confirmed on 1 August 2025 that they would not be seeking re-election.
- Cr Neville Cooke of the Invercargill-Rakiura regional constituency.
- Cr Robert Guyton of the Invercargill-Rakiura regional constituency.

=== Councillors ===
==== Fiordland constituency ====
The Fiordland constituency returned one councillor to the regional council.

Candidate	Affiliation (Note: A candidate may leave their affiliation blank, run as an independent, or run with an affiliation to an organisation, local body ticket or political party. Environment Southland does not allow whānau, hapū, or iwi details to be used for the affiliation.)	Notes
Paul Evans	Independent	Incumbent councillor

As the only candidate, Evans was re-elected unopposed.

==== Eastern-Dome constituency ====
The Eastern-Dome constituency returned two councillors to the regional council.

Candidate	Affiliation	Notes
Alastair Gibson	None	Incumbent councillor
Jeremy McPhail	None	Incumbent councillor and deputy chair

As the number of candidates did not exceed the number of positions available, Gibson and McPhail were re-elected unopposed.

==== Western constituency ====
The Western constituency returned one councillor to the regional council.

Candidate	Affiliation	Notes
Ewan Mathieson	None	Incumbent councillor, dairy farmer and DairyNZ local leader

As the only candidate, Mathieson was re-elected unopposed.

==== Hokonui constituency ====
The Hokonui constituency returned one councillor to the regional council.

Candidate	Affiliation	Notes
Peter McDonald	None	Incumbent councillor
David Rose	None	Farmer and former President of the Southland chapter of Federated Farmers

==== Southern constituency ====
The Southern constituency returned one councillor to the regional council.

Candidate	Affiliation	Notes
Jon Pemberton	None	Incumbent councillor

As the only candidate, Pemberton was re-elected unopposed.

==== Invercargill-Rakiura constituency ====
The Invercargill-Rakiura constituency returned six councillors to the regional council.

Candidate	Affiliation	Notes
Joshua Cumberland	None	River engineer
Roger Hodson	Independent	Environmental scientist and member of the Southland Conservation Board (2024–2027 term)
Lyndal Ludlow	Independent	High School Relief Teacher, Incumbent councillor
Phil Morrison	Independent	Incumbent councillor and Southland Regional Climate Change Working Group co-chairman
Nick Perham	None	WorkSafe New Zealand safety assessor, former Southland District Councillor and unsuccessful National Party candidate for the Southland electorate
Maurice Rodway	None	Incumbent councillor
Eric Roy	None	Incumbent councillor and former National Party Member of Parliament for Awarua and Invercargill.
Nathan Surendran	Honesty, Responsibility, Resilience	Entrepreneur, tertiary tutor and 2019 Southland Regional Council election candidate
Roy Te Maiharoa	None	Tutor and instructor at the Southern Institute of Technology. He also contested the 2023 Invercargill City Council by-election.
Annette Trent	Independent	Agriculturalist and chair of the Southern Farmers Market
Geoffrey Young	None	Unsuccessful 2022 Southland District mayoral candidate, farmer and southern South Island director for the farming lobby group Beef + Lamb New Zealand.

== Results ==
Twelve councillors were elected to Environment Southland across six constituencies.

=== Fiordland constituency ===
2025 Fiordland constituency election
Party	Candidate	Votes	%	±%
Independent	Paul Evans^{†}	elected unopposed		
Registered electors		2,900		
Independent hold				
^{†} incumbent

=== Eastern-Dome constituency ===
2025 Eastern-Dome constitueny election
Party	Candidate	Votes	%	±%
Independent	Alastair Gibson^{†}	elected unopposed		
Independent	Jeremy McPhail^{†}	elected unopposed		
Registered electors		11,467		
Independent hold				
Independent hold				
^{†} incumbent

=== Western constituency ===
2025 Western constituency election
Party	Candidate	Votes	%	±%
Independent	Ewen Mathieson	elected unopposed		
Registered electors		4,921		
Independent gain from Independent				

=== Hokonui constituency ===
2025 Hokonui constituency election
Party	Candidate	Votes	%	±%
Independent	David Rose	1,378	52.32	(new)
Independent	Peter McDonald^{†}	1,142	43.36	−8.01
Informal votes		2	0.08	+0.04
Blank votes		109	4.14	−4.29
Turnout		2,634	44.11	+0.00
Registered electors		5,972		
Independent gain from Independent				
^{†} incumbent

=== Southern constituency ===
2025 Southern constituency election
Party	Candidate	Votes	%	±%
Independent	Jon Pemberton^{†}	elected unopposed		
Registered electors		4,016		
Independent hold				
^{†} incumbent

=== Invercargill constituency ===
2025 Invercargill-Rakiura constituency election
Party	Candidate	Votes	%	±%
Independent	Eric Roy^{†}	8,568	47.14	−7.32
Independent	Lyndal Ludlow^{†}	7,883	43.38	−3.02
Independent	Maurice Rodway^{†}	7,096	39.04	−7.15
Independent	Roger Hodson	5,921	32.58	(new)
Independent	Geoffrey Young	5,469	30.09	(new)
Independent	Phil Morrison^{†}	5,354	29.46	−9.53
Independent	Joshua Cumberland	5,316	29.25	(new)
Independent	Nathan Surendran	5,295	29.14	(new)
Independent	Annette Trent	4,923	27.09	(new)
Independent	Rob Te Maiharoa	4,686	25.78	(new)
Independent	Nick Perham	3,782	20.81	(new)
Informal votes		9	0.05	−0.01
Blank votes		1,953	10.75	+1.54
Turnout		18,174	46.45	−6.81
Registered electors		39,124		
Independent hold				
Independent hold				
Independent hold				
Independent gain from Independent				
Independent gain from Independent				
Independent hold				
^{†} incumbent

== See also ==
- 2025 Invercargill City Council election
