= Becs Amundsen =

New Zealand politician

Becs Amundsen KSM
- Amundsen in 2026

Deputy mayor of Invercargill
- In office 2017–2019
- Preceded by: Darren Ludlow
- Succeeded by: Toni Biddle

Personal details
- Born: Rebecca Rae Amundsen; 1977 or 1978 (age 48–49) Whanganui, New Zealand
- Spouse: Phil Orr
- Children: 2
- Education: Massey University

Rebecca Rae Amundsen KSM (born 1977 or 1978) is a New Zealand politician and community activist. She served on the Invercargill City Council from 2013 to 2022 and was deputy mayor to Tim Shadbolt from 2017 to 2019.

== Early life ==
Amundsen was born in 1977 or 1978 in Whanganui, where she was also raised, attending Whanganui Girls' College. At the age of 18 she gave birth to her first child. At 20 she moved to the South Island, living in Ashburton, Christchurch, and Oamaru before settling in Invercargill in 2001 so her partner Phil Orr could study at the Southern Institute of Technology via the Zero Fees Scheme. Amundsen studied social anthropology extramurally at Massey University.

== Career ==
Amundsen first ran for the Invercargill City Council in the 2012 by-election. She was unsuccessful, coming in sixth place. She was elected in 2013 as the lowest-polling councillor and also one of the youngest. In 2016 she was re-elected in fourth place. In May 2017, Tim Shadbolt appointed Amundsen deputy mayor following the resignation of Darren Ludlow.

On 12 March 2019, Amundsen announced she would challenge Shadbolt in the 2019 Invercargill mayoral election, officially launching her campaign on 25 July. Amundsen joined other councillors in calling on Shadbolt to retire, saying he could no longer effectively chair council meetings. With Amundsen's predecessor Darren Ludlow and former MP Ria Bond launching their own mayoral campaigns in April, there was concern that they would split the anti-Shadbolt vote. Though Bond ultimately did not make it to the ballot, these concerns were proven correct as Shadbolt's challengers collectively received more votes than him. Amundsen came third, however she was re-elected as a councillor. She wanted to continue as deputy mayor, but Shadbolt chose to replace her with Toni Biddle.

On 20 May 2022, Amundsen launched her campaign for the 2022 Invercargill mayoral election, still feeling that Shadbolt could no longer perform his duties. However on 8 August she withdrew her candidacy, citing the large number of candidates. She would still run for re-election to the council. Shadbolt was defeated in the election, but so too was Amundsen, placing sixteenth.

Both during and since her time on the council, Amundsen has been involved in leadership positions at numerous arts, cultural heritage, and women's rights organisations. In the 2026 King's Birthday Honours, she received the King's Service Medal for services to local government, arts and the community.
