= Paraparaumu College =

State secondary school in Paraparaumu, New Zealand

- Te Kāreti o Paraparaumu
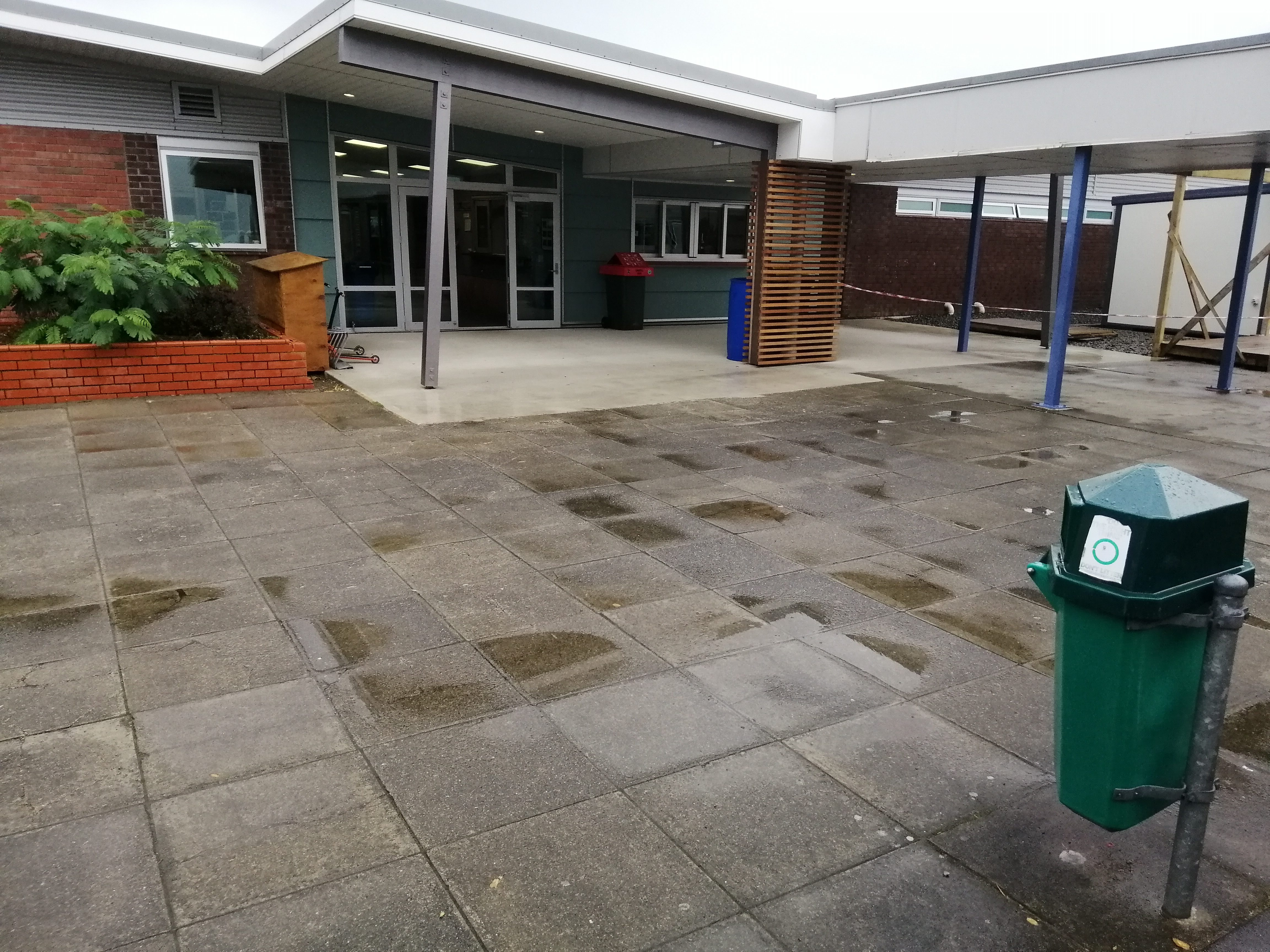
- Office building in 2019

Location
- Mazengarb Road, Paraparaumu, New Zealand, 5032; 40.8889°S 175.0044°E

Information
- Type: State Secondary (Year 9–13)
- Motto: A caring community of great learners
- Ministry of Education Institution no.: 248
- Principal: Mark Robinson (as of Term 2 2024)
- Years: 9–13
- Gender: Coeducational
- Enrolment: 1,488 (July 2026)
- Socio-economic decile: 8
- Website: paraparaumucollege.school.nz

Paraparaumu College (Māori: Te Kāreti o Paraparaumu) is a Year 9 to 13 co-educational state school on the Kāpiti Coast of New Zealand. There is an international student programme operating with students attending from different countries. The college was opened in 1977.

== History ==
In the late 1970s the Kapiti Borough Council gave a grant to the college of up to $70,000 for a gymnasium.

In 1987 the principal was Neil McDonald, and the roll was 940 students.

From 1988 to 2012, Richard Campbell was the school's principal. Over these 25 years, he oversaw the uniform change from brown and yellow to navy and green, the introduction of NCEA, the introduction of a zoning scheme, and numerous construction projects. The school roll grew to 1340 under his care.

From 2013 to 2018, Gregor Fountain was principal, resigning to become principal of Wellington College – his former school. During this period, the CARE values (Collaborative, Active learner, Respectful and Effective self-manager) were introduced as foundational principles modelling ideal student behaviour in the school.

In term 3 of 2018 Craig Steed arrived as principal in replacement of Gregor Fountain from Freyberg High School in Palmerston North.

In term 2 of 2024 Mark Robinson, the former principal of Waiopehu College in Levin succeeds Craig Steed as principal of Paraparaumu college as Mr Steed moves to philadelphia temporarily.

== Facilities ==
In February 2018, construction began on a $2.2 million upgrade to the administration block. It was completed in late 2018, and named "Te Manawa" (translating to 'The Heart' in English).

In June 2021, construction began on a $1.7 million cultural centre, and was finished in 2022. It is named "Te Whare Ahurea".

== Arts ==
The school has a jazz band that has attended the Manawatu Jazz Festival Youth Jazz Competition in 2019.

== Notable alumni ==
- Ben Bell, mayor of Gore
- Dane Coles (born 1986), All Blacks
- Michelle Seymour (born 1965), sprinter
- Paul Steinmetz, rugby union player, All Black (2002)
- Stephen Kearney, rugby league player and coach, New Zealand Warriors
- Andrew Knewstubb, Olympic rugby sevens player
