= Nora Poppelwell =

Former mayoress of Gore

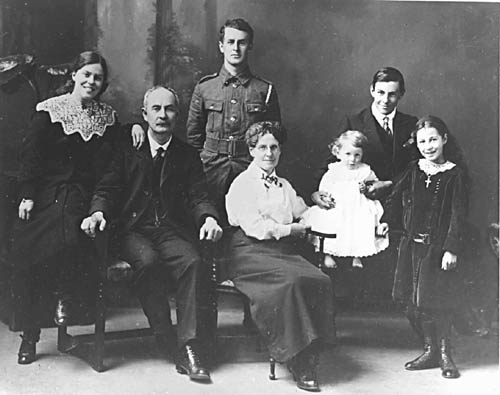
- Poppelwell and family
- Born: 1863; Gore, New Zealand
- Died: 1941 (aged 78); Gore, New Zealand
- Occupation: Mayoress
- Spouse: Dugald Poppelwell
- Children: William, Harold, Dugald, Moana and Mary Poppelwell
- Parent(s): Thomas Green (Father), Mary Green (Mother)

Nora Poppelwell (née Green, 1873–1941) was the mayoress of Gore, New Zealand, from 1895 for four terms.

== Early life ==
Poppelwell was born in Gore, the eldest daughter of Thomas and Mary Green. She attended a private school run by Miss Magdelena Orchiston, then was a first day pupil at Gore Public School when it opened in 1878. Through her role as church harmonium player she met Dugald Poppelwell, who conducted the choir, and they married on 10 April 1894.

== Adult life ==
Poppelwell's husband was elected Mayor of Gore in 1895. and served four terms in office. As mayoress, Poppelwell was well-respected for her contribution to the community. She performed ceremonial roles, such as in 1896 when she opened the new Gore traffic bridge, and also led the community in charitable works, such as in 1913, when she and a group of helpers fed evacuees in her own home after a flood destroyed their homes. During World War I Poppelwell was president of the Gore Patriotic League.

Poppelwell had eight children, although three died young. Of the five who survived, three were sons (William, Harold and Dugald) and two were daughters (Moana and Mary). Both her daughters went on to become Sisters of Mercy.
