= Nobby Clark (politician) =

New Zealand politician (born 1950s)

44th Mayor of Invercargill
- In office 8 October 2022 – 11 October 2025
- Preceded by: Tim Shadbolt
- Succeeded by: Tom Campbell

Personal details
- Born: William Stuart Clark; 1951 or 1952 (age 74–75) Nelson, New Zealand

William Stuart "Nobby" Clark (born 1951 or 1952) is a New Zealand politician who served as the mayor of Invercargill from 2022 to 2025. He had served on the Invercargill City Council since 2019 and as deputy mayor from 2020 to 2022.

== Early life and career ==
Clark was born in Nelson, New Zealand and moved to Auckland after leaving school. He served as a medic during the Vietnam War, and subsequently moved to Invercargill in 1975. He has been described as a blue-collar worker and worked at Child, Youth and Family, Stopping Violence Southland, and IHC New Zealand.

He was employed by Idea Services the company owned by IHC, until he was sacked as their Southland regional manager. He initially lost a wrongful dismissal case, but on appeal won $15,500 compensation and repayment of costs.

== First term, 2019–2022 ==
Prior to being elected to council in 2019, Clark was spokesman of the Invercargill Ratepayers Advocacy Group. He was the highest polling Invercargill city council candidate in 2019, with 10,802 votes. He was selected by mayor Tim Shadbolt to be deputy mayor on 12 October 2020, following the resignation of Toni Biddle. Following clashes with Shadbolt, Clark announced his intention to resign as deputy in March 2022, but was eventually convinced to stay on.

=== 2022 Invercargill mayoral election ===
On 30 May 2022, Clark announced his candidacy for the 2022 Invercargill mayoral election. In June, he announced the formation of a group of ten council candidates he would run alongside. The group mostly consists of new candidates, though incumbent councillor Allan Arnold was among them. This ticket was revealed in July to be called "Let's Go Invercargill".

On 8 October, Clark won the Invercargill mayoral election, winning 6,537 votes. The incumbent Shadbolt only won 847 votes while the second-highest candidate Newstalk ZB broadcaster Marcus Lush won 3,785 votes.

== Mayor of Invercargill, 2022–2025 ==
Following his election as Mayor, Clark announced that he would focus on opposing the Government's Three Waters reform programme, building a new museum in Invercargill and reviewing project spending. He also detailed plans to cut $50 million from the city's $115 million budget. He stated that he would not wear the mayoral robes and would not be addressed as "Your Worship" as his predecessor had. On 14 October, he appointed newly elected councillor Tom Campbell as his deputy.

On 1 November, Clark attempted to remove the speaking rights of mana whenua representatives at full council meetings, as they did not have voting rights. This proposal was defeated in a council vote.

Clark made national headlines in March 2023 for his use of the word nigger in a speech at an arts event. He argued that he was questioning the line between artistic expression and hate speech in response to a controversial poem by Tusiata Avia.

The incident was covered in an episode of New Zealand Today in March 2024, during which Guy Williams attempted to convince Clark not to use the word nigger.

On 23 July 2024, an independent investigation found that he had breached the code of conduct on four counts. At an extraordinary meeting on 26 July 2024, the council voted to censure Clark and requested an apology. On 30 July, Clark issued a public apology for breaching the council's code of conduct by using racist and homophobic slurs along with "insulting and degrading behaviour" during the New Zealand Today television interview.

On 6 April, Clark hosted a three-hour meeting at Invercargill's Civic Theatre where civic leaders heard community feedback and discussed solutions to the city's crime problems. Victims of crimes including local business owners and former perpetrators shared their stories including ram raids and organised shoplifting. During the meeting, Clark and local Police area commander Mike Bowman discussed efforts to combat crime including a new security camera system worth NZ$2.2 million.

On 16 March 2024, Clark was invited to attend a United Fire Brigades' Association (UFBA) prize-giving dinner. His conduct at the dinner resulted in UFBA chief executive William Butzbach filing a complaint with the council. According to an independent investigation, Clark made disparaging remarks about volunteer firefighters and repeated personal attacks against one female MC. He also disparaged young people in positions of authority, understood to be a dig at Gore mayor Ben Bell. Clark disagreed with the alleged severity of his comments, but admitted that some of them were inappropriate and wrote an apology to the UFBA. He also apologised to Bell after Bell reached out to him. Clark placed blame on "brain fade" following his heart surgery, which he said could last up to two years. Clutha mayor Bryan Cadogan questioned this diagnosis, having dealt with his own cardiac issues.

After the investigation was completed, an extraordinary council meeting was called for 21 June to address the complaint. At the beginning of the meeting, Clark stated that he would not resign and left the room. The council unanimously voted to accept the findings of the investigation that Clark had breached the code of conduct, however a motion for the council to formally ask Clark to resign failed 5–6. The council instead voted to send a letter of censure, require that Clark specifically apologise to the MC he offended, and ask that he delegate future public engagements to the deputy mayor. The next day, Clark agreed to the further apology but stated that he would continue to speak at public engagements.

On 24 June, Clark announced that he would take another month off work, saying that he came back too soon following his surgery.

In late October 2024, Clark expressed disagreement with the Invercargill City Council regarding upgrades to Bluff's waste water network.

=== 2025 local elections ===
In mid-October 2024, Clark confirmed that he would not be contesting the 2025 Invercargill City Council election as Mayor, telling the Otago Daily Times he wanted to spend more time with his partner Karen Carter. He confirmed that the 2022–25 term would be his final term as Mayor and that he would focus on the construction of the new Southland Museum and Art Gallery, the development of Wachner Pl and waste management consents for Bluff and Clifton.

== Personal life ==
Clark has the distinction of being the first person to run the Kepler track 30 times. In 2004 he became just the fourth person to donate a kidney anonymously in New Zealand. Cancer runs in Clark's family, and in 2022, he was diagnosed with follicular thyroid cancer. In December 2023 Clark suffered a minor heart attack. Originally scheduled for a quadruple bypass surgery, he only required a double bypass on 3 January 2024. He took a break from council duties until March 2024.

In late June 2025, Clark experienced a minor stroke and took leave from work for a week.

== Views and positions ==
He is a self-described "socialist at heart" and lifelong supporter of the New Zealand Labour Party. However, he switched his support to the right-wing ACT New Zealand party at the 2023 general election.
