= Dane Coles =

NZ international rugby union player

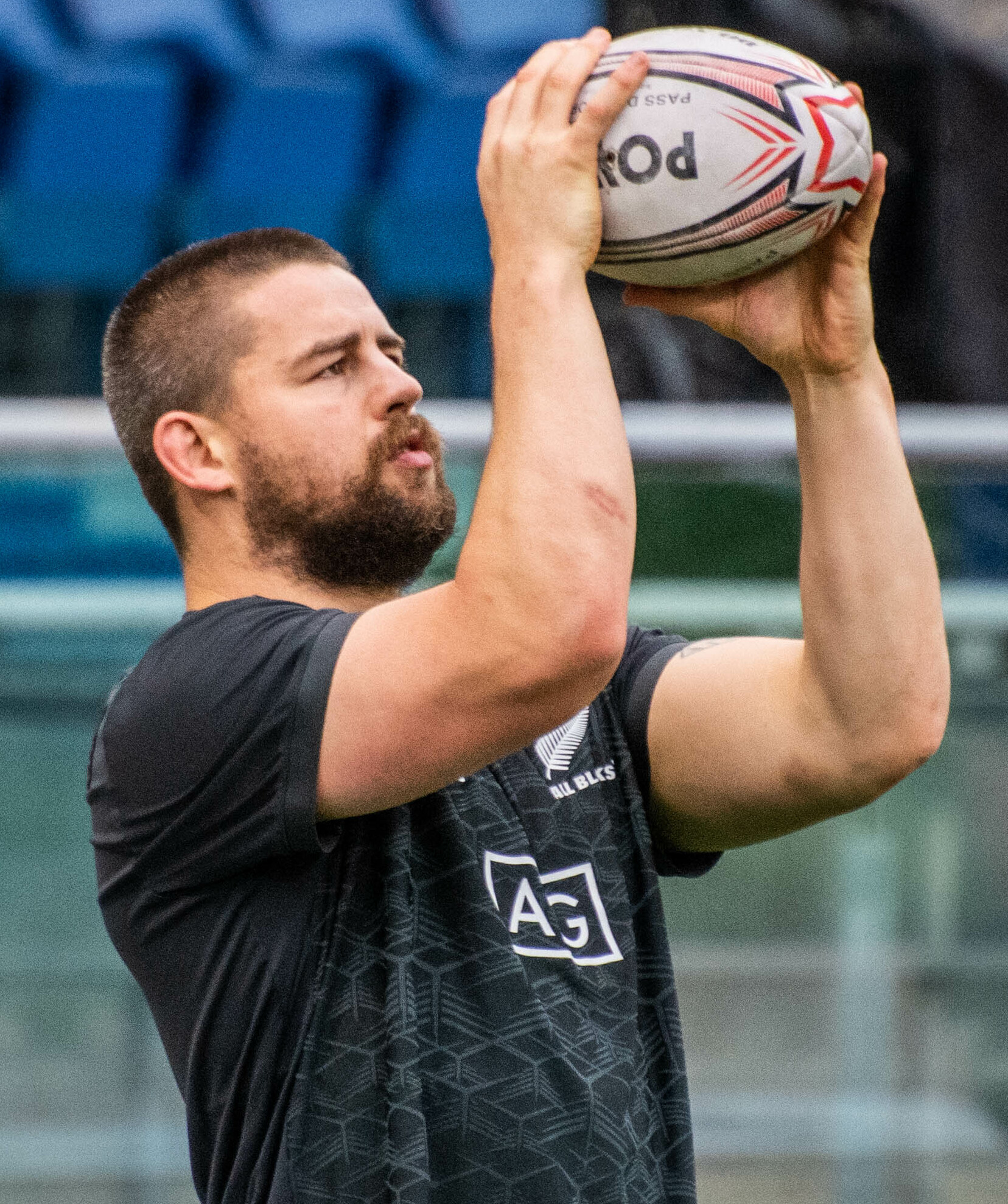
- Coles representing New Zealand during the November Internationals
- Full name: Dane Stuart Coles
- Born: 10 December 1986 (age 39) Paraparaumu, New Zealand
- Height: 1.84 m (6 ft 0 in)
- Weight: 110 kg (243 lb; 17 st 5 lb)
- School: Paraparaumu College; Wellington College

Rugby union career
- Position: Hooker
Senior career
Years	Team	Apps	(Points)
2007–2022	Wellington	71	(90)
2009–2023	Hurricanes	141	(145)
2024	Kubota Spears	10	(20)
- Correct as of 11 July 2024
International career
Years	Team	Apps	(Points)
2007	New Zealand U21	1	(0)
2010	New Zealand Māori	3	(0)
2012–2023	New Zealand	90	(115)
- Correct as of 29 October 2023
Medal record
Men's Rugby union
Representing New Zealand
Rugby World Cup
Gold medal – first place	2015 England	Squad
Silver medal – second place	2023 France	Squad
Bronze medal – third place	2019 Japan	Squad

Dane Stuart Coles (born 10 December 1986) is a New Zealand former professional rugby union player.

Coles was a key member of the 2015 Rugby World Cup winning team. He also captained the Hurricanes to their maiden Super Rugby title in 2016. He was widely regarded as one of the best hookers in the world at the height of his career and was a nominee for World Rugby Player of the Year in 2016.

== Early life ==
Coles attended Paraparaumu Beach School. He later attended Paraparaumu College and Wellington College.

== Rugby career ==
In 2012, Coles made his All Blacks debut against Scotland. He came on in the 62nd minute: New Zealand 51, Scotland 22. Coles made three more appearances off the bench in 2012, earning his first start for New Zealand in 2013 against France.

Coles scored his first try against South Africa in 2014 in a 25–27 loss and had also become a regular starter for New Zealand by 2014, supplanting long-serving All Black great Keven Mealamu from the starting XV.

Coles started in the knockout rounds of the 2015 Rugby World Cup, including the final against Australia, where the 34–17 victory saw New Zealand become the first team to win back-to-back World Cup titles.

Of Ngāti Porou descent, Coles was awarded the Tom French Memorial Cup in 2016 as the Māori rugby player of the year. After scoring four tries that year, which made him the highest-scoring forward in the squad for 2016, Coles was also nominated for New Zealand Rugby Player of the Year and World Rugby Player of the Year earlier in 2016, losing both awards to Hurricanes teammate Beauden Barrett.

Following the 2015 Rugby World Cup, Hurricanes midfielder and Captain Conrad Smith announced that he would leave New Zealand for Pau in France. Smith's departure saw Coles named as the captain of the Hurricanes for 2016.

Coles played in the first three games of the 2017 Super Rugby season for the Hurricanes but after a concussion on 18 March missed an extended period of time, including the drawn British and Irish Lions test series. Coles lost the Hurricanes captaincy to halfback TJ Perenara but returned to play in the Super Rugby quarter final on 21 July against the Brumbies in Canberra, coming off the bench for Ricky Riccitelli in the Hurricanes dominant 35–16 victory. He started the following week's semi-final against the Lions at Ellis Park Stadium, which the Hurricanes lost. Due to concussion he missed the first Bledisloe Cup test of 2017 but earned his 50th test in a 35–29 win against Australia in the second Bledisloe Cup test on 26 August. Coles was retained as a starting player for the rest of the 2017 Rugby Championship despite the form of Codie Taylor who had started against the Lions in his absence. Coles scored a try in the 38–18 win against France but was subbed off after 20 minutes, due to tearing his ACL, in what was only his 11th professional rugby game of 2017.

Coles missed all of the 2018 Super Rugby season due to his ACL injury. Coles was expected to be back in time for the playoffs but was physically unable to run until June. England international, Brad Shields, captained the Hurricanes in 2018 in Coles' absence. After finally recovering from injury at the back-end of the 2018 Mitre 10 Cup, Coles, as well as his teammate Nepo Laulala were both recalled for New Zealand after a long injury-enforced absence. Coles played four tests for New Zealand during the 2018 end-of-year rugby union internationals, but was on the bench for the All Blacks against England and Ireland, having been surpassed as the first-choice hooker by Codie Taylor.

In 2021 Coles led the haka for the All Blacks side a total four times. For all four the Ka Mate version was performed. On 10 July 2021 versus Fiji Coles scored four tries which is a record for an All Blacks forward in one match.

After the 2023 Rugby World Cup Coles signed with Japanese club Kubota Spears.

== Style of play ==
Coles is a modern-game hooker who, without sacrificing mass or power for breakdown phases, is also extremely mobile across the field and capable of producing high-quality passing. Such set of skills, traditionally unusual in a front-rower, allow him to join setplays as an extra centre and even to deliver impressively fast runs on the wing. His effectiveness has been praised after his international debut, "with many experts describing Coles as having 'revolutionised' the role of the modern hooker".

== Honours ==
New Zealand

- Rugby World Cup / Webb Ellis Cup
  - Winner: 2015
  - Third-place: 2019
  - Second-place: 2023

Hurricanes

  - Winner Super Rugby - 2016

=== Individual ===
IRB player of the year nominee - 2016

Awards
Preceded by Nehe Milner-Skudder	Tom French Memorial; Māori rugby union player of the year 2016	Succeeded by Rieko Ioane
