= Selwyn Water =

Selwyn Water Limited is a council-controlled organisation (CCO) owned by the Selwyn District Council that is responsible for managing drinking and wastewater services in the Selwyn District. It was the first water services entity established in July 2025 under the New Zealand Government's Local Water Done Well programme.

== Functions and responsibilities ==
Selwyn Water is responsible for managing and delivering drinking and waste water services in the Selwyn District. It serves about 30,000 households and over 8,000 businesses in the district. Selwyn Water has a governing board. As of July 2025, it was eligible to borrow up to 500 percent of its revenue through the Local Government Funding Agency.

== History ==
=== Background ===
In April 2025, the Selwyn District Council voted to establish a water services council-controlled organisation despite 87% percent of 424 submissions opposing the proposal and opting to retain in-house water services. Rolleston Residents Association chair Mark Alexander criticised the Council for ignoring public opposition to the proposed entity, saying that ratepayers would be responsible for the cost of creating such a company, governing board, and paying board members and staff. In response to criticism, Mayor of Selwyn Sam Broughton said that the council had addressed concerns about higher costs and reduced local control. The Council also said that retaining an in-house model would limit its ability to borrow for large-scale infrastructure projects within the Selwyn District.

=== Launch ===
Selwyn Water was established on 8 July 2025 after the Sixth National Government approved the Selwyn District Council's Water Services Delivery Plan. The Selwyn District Council was the first district council in New Zealand to establish a company to manage drinking and wastewater services under the New Zealand government's Local Water Done Well programme. Selwyn Water was established at a cost of NZ$2 million, with the CCO supported by a 14.2 percent increase in rates within the Selwyn District. The organisation's inauguration ceremony at the Pines Water Treatment Plant was attended by Mayor Broughton, Local Government Minister Simon Watts and Member of Parliament for Selwyn Nicola Grigg. Over the following six months, the Council transferred relevant staff, assets and systems to Selwyn Water while retaining responsibility for managing stormwater services. This process was completed in mid-December 2025, with Selwyn Water expected to start billing customers in July 2026.

In mid-February 2026, the Otago Daily Times reported that Selwyn Water was conducting a review of customer, asset and financial information and sorting issues identified through the transfer of assets and services from the Selwyn District Council prior to billing customers in July 2026. In response to strong community opposition, the District Council issued a statement defending Selwyn Water's work.

In mid-March 2026, Selwyn Water submitted its draft ten-year plan (including 2026/27 pricing) to the Selwyn District Council. The CCO proposed an 18 percent rates hike for drinking and wastewater services. In early May 2026, the company sought public consultation on raising rates to fund plans to spend $24.19 million on upgrading the Selwyn District's wastewater network to keep up with population growth. On 1 July 2026, The Press reported that the Selwyn District's total rates for the 2026/27 year had risen by 8.8% percent to account for an 18% increase in drinking and wastewater services provided by Selwyn Water.
