= 2019 Invercargill mayoral election =

2019 mayoral election in Invercargill, New Zealand

- 12 October 2019
- Turnout: 20,022 (53.01%)
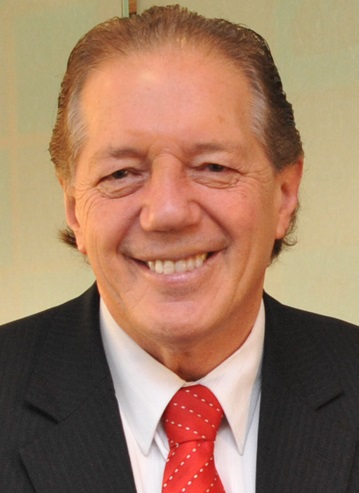
Candidate	Tim Shadbolt	Darren Ludlow	Becs Amundsen
Party	Independent	Independent	Independent
Popular vote	9,672	6,425	3,302
Percentage	48.30	32.08	16.49
Mayor before election
Tim Shadbolt
Elected mayor
Tim Shadbolt

The 2019 Invercargill mayoral election was part of the New Zealand local elections that were held on 12 October 2019 to elect the Mayor of Invercargill. Incumbent mayor Tim Shadbolt was re-elected to his ninth term with a reduced majority.

== Key dates ==
Key dates for the election were:

- 1 July: Electoral Commission enrolment campaign starts.
- 19 July: Nominations open for candidates. Rolls open for inspection.
- 16 August: Nominations close at noon. Rolls close.
- 21 August: Election date and candidates' names announced.
- 20 to 25 September: Voting documents delivered to households. Electors can post the documents back to electoral officers as soon as they have voted.
- 12 October: Polling day. Voting documents must be at the council before voting closes at noon. Preliminary results will be available as soon as all ordinary votes are counted.
- 17 to 23 October: Official results, including all valid ordinary and special votes, declared.

== Candidates ==
=== Declared candidates ===
- Becs Amundsen, incumbent Deputy Mayor of Invercargill
- Steve Chernishov, candidate for city council in 2016
- Darren Ludlow, Invercargill City Councillor and former Deputy Mayor of Invercargill
- Tim Shadbolt, incumbent Mayor of Invercargill

=== Rejected candidates ===
- Ria Bond, former New Zealand First list MP

=== Withdrawn candidates ===
- Toni Biddle, Invercargill City Councillor

=== Declined to be candidates ===
- Paddy O'Brien, ILT board member and former international rugby union referee
- Ian Pottinger, Invercargill City Councillor

== Results ==
The following table gives the election results:

2019 Invercargill mayoral election
Party	Candidate	Votes	%	±%
Independent	Tim Shadbolt	9,672	48.30	−7.19
Independent	Darren Ludlow	6,425	32.08	
Independent	Becs Amundsen	3,302	16.49	
Independent	Steve Chernishov	623	3.11	
Majority		3,427	16.22	−10.05
Turnout		20,022	53.01	−1.89
