= Queen Elizabeth College, Palmerston North =

Queen Elizabeth College

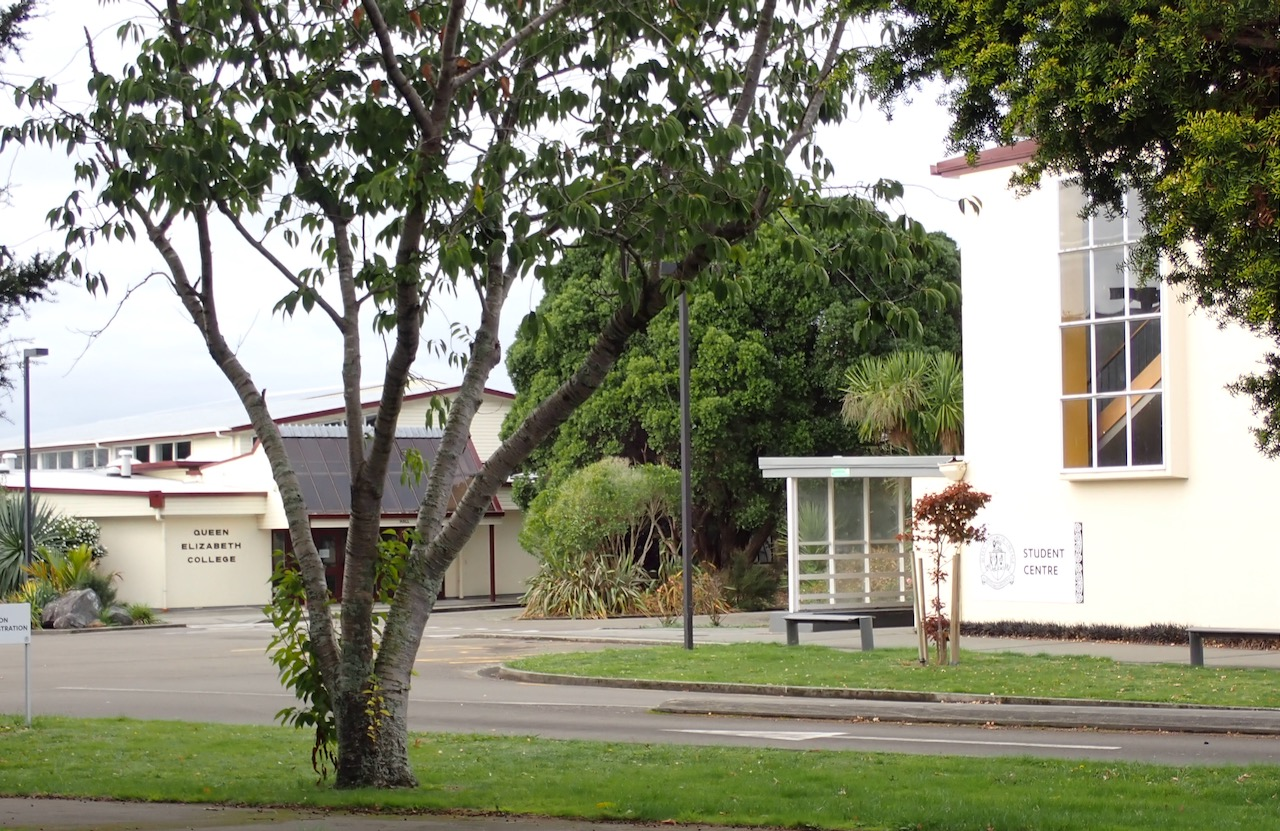

Location
- Rangitikei Street, Palmerston North, New Zealand; 40.3463°S 175.6051°E

Information
- Type: State
- Motto: Scientia est Potentia; Knowledge is Power
- Established: 1906; 120 years ago
- Ministry of Education Institution no.: 201
- Principal: Chris Moller
- Years: 7–13
- Gender: Coeducational
- Enrolment: 415 (July 2026)
- Socio-economic decile: 3G
- Website: qec.school.nz

Queen Elizabeth College (simply known as QEC) is a state Co-Educational secondary school for Years 7-13 in the city of Palmerston North, New Zealand.

== Location ==
The school is located on Rangitikei Street, Palmerston North.

== Enrolment ==
As of July 2026, Queen Elizabeth College has a roll of 415 students, of which 250 (60.2%) identify as Māori.

As of 2026, the school has an Equity Index of 556, placing it amongst schools whose students have the most socioeconomic barriers to achievement (roughly equivalent to deciles 1 and 2 under the former socio-economic decile system).

== Facilities ==
Queen Elizabeth College has many facilities and resources for its students, such as:

- Two gyms
- A music suite
- Te Matui (Kitchens, sleeping and classroom)
- Arts suite

QEC is the home of ACE Night School (Adult Continuing Education)

== Colours ==
The colours of Queen Elizabeth College are black, maroon and gold.

== History ==
Queen Elizabeth College was founded in 1906 as Palmerston North Technical School. However the school was 4 years in the making, from a public meeting held in the city in 1902, gauging public interest in technical classes. The first classes were held at the Palmerston North High School (which was also split into two single gender secondary schools) and also at Campbell Street School.

In 1903, the High School and the Technical School were separated.

In 1908, land was bought at Princess Street, when in 1909 a building was opened to house the school (this is now the main campus of UCOL).

== Notable alumni ==
- Ria Bond, New Zealand First MP
- Jacqui Dean, former television and radio host. National MP for Otago, Waitaki.
- Nehe Milner-Skudder, rugby union player. All Black, Hurricane and Manawatu Turbo.
