= 2025 Invercargill City Council election =

Elections in New Zealand

- 11 October 2025
- Turnout: 17,996 (46.35% ▼6.84 pp)
- Mayor
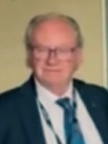
		Ind
Candidate	Tom Campbell	Alex Crackett
Party	Independent	Independent
Popular vote	6.948	5,202
Percentage	38.61%	28.91%
	Ind	Ind
Candidate	Ian Pottinger	Ria Bond
Party	Independent	Independent
Popular vote	2,322	1,803
Percentage	12.90%	10.02%
Mayor before election
Nobby Clark
Lets Go Invercargill
Elected mayor
Tom Campbell
Independent
- Councillors
- 12 seats on the governing body of Invercargill City Council; 7 seats needed for a majority
Party	Seats	+/–
Independents	12	+4
This lists parties that won seats. See the complete results below.
Control before	Control after
No majority	No majority

The 2025 Invercargill City Council election was a local election held from 9 September to 11 October in Invercargill, New Zealand, as part of that year's territorial authority elections and other local elections held nation-wide.

Voters elected the mayor of Invercargill, 12 city councillors, and other local representatives for the 2025–2028 term of the Invercargill City Council. Postal voting and the first-past-the-post voting system were used.

Tom Campbell, councillor and deputy mayor since 2022, was elected to the mayoralty, replacing retiring mayor Nobby Clark.

== Key dates ==
- 4 July 2025: Nominations for candidates opened
- 1 August 2025: Nominations for candidates closed at 12 pm
- 9 September 2025: Voting documents were posted and voting opened
- 11 October 2025: Voting closed at 12 pm and progress results were published later that day
- 11–12 October 2025: Preliminary results released
- 16–19 October 2025: Final results were declared.

== Background ==
=== Positions up for election ===
Voters in the city elected the mayor of Invercargill, 12 city councillors at-large, the members of the Bluff Community Board, and the members of the Invercargill Licensing Trust. They also elected six members of Environment Southland.

== Campaign ==
=== Debates ===
A mayoral candidates debate hosted by broadcaster Duncan Garner was held at the Ascot Park Hotel. Candidates participating in the debate included Alex Crackett, Ian Pottinger, Ria Bond, Tom Campbell, Steve Chernishov, Tom Morton, and Andrew Clark. The debate covered a range of topics including boosting the local economy and infrastructure. Mayoral candidate Gordon McCrone was excluded by the organiser due to his connection to a controversial website.

== List of candidates ==
=== Incumbents not seeking re-election ===
- Nobby Clark, mayor since 2022
- Peter Kett, councillor
- Lesley Soper, councillor since 2016

=== Mayor ===
Candidate	Affiliation (Note: A candidate may leave their affiliation blank, run as an independent, or run with an affiliation to an organisation, local body ticket or political party. Invercargill City Council does not allow whānau, hapū, or iwi details to be used for the affiliation.)	Notes
Ria Bond	Independent	Councillor since 2022. Also ran for re-election as a councillor.
Tom Campbell	None	Deputy mayor since 2022
Stevey Chernishov	None	Brand developer. Previously ran for mayor in 2022.
Andrew Clark	None	Brother of incumbent mayor Nobby Clark. Also ran for mayor in the Tasman District under the name Maxwell Clark.
Alex Crackett	Independent	Councillor since 2016. Also ran for re-election as a councillor.
Gordon McCrone	Advanced Task Force Political Party	
Tom Morton	Independent	Previously ran for mayor in 2022. Also ran for council.
Ian Pottinger	None	Councillor since 2010. Also ran for council.

==== Withdrawn ====
- Lynley McKerrow, former Invercargill town crier, had announced her intention to run for the mayoralty in June. She withdrew her candidacy for mayor in July, citing not wanting to split the vote, and indicated she would instead just run as a councillor.

=== Council ===
Twelve councillors were elected at-large to the city council.

Candidate	Affiliation	Notes
Allan Arnold	None	Incumbent councillor since 2016
Ria Bond	Independent	Incumbent councillor since 2022. Also ran for mayor.
Trish Boyle	Integrity, Independence	Incumbent councillor since 2022
Steve Broad	None	Incumbent councillor since 2023
Jay Coote	Independent	
Pania Coote	Consumer Advocate	Incumbent mana whenua representative for Te Rūnanga o Awarua
Alex Crackett	Independent	Incumbent councillor. Also ran for mayor.
Chris Dawson	None	
Grant Dermody	None	Incumbent councillor since 2022
Andrea de Vries	None	
Carl Heenan	None	Previously ran in the 2023 council by-election
Karl Herman	None	Previously ran for council in 2022
Carol (CJ) Jasperse	None	
Terry King	Advocate and Lobbyist for Invercargill	
Amanda Laurie	None	
Darren Ludlow	None	Incumbent councillor
Marcus Lush	None	Broadcaster and former councillor (2021–2022)
Lynley McKerrow	None	Former Invercargill town crier
David Meades	Independent	Previously ran in the 2023 council by-election
Tom Morton	Independent	Also ran for mayor
Dan O'Connell	None	
Noel Peterson	Independent- Serving Community	Previously ran for council in 2022
Ian Pottinger	None	Incumbent councillor since 2010. Also ran for mayor.
Ian Reeves	None	Previously ran in the 2023 council by-election
Barry Stewart	None	Incumbent councillor
Lisa Tou-McNaughton	Positivity, Partnership and Progress	Previously ran in the 2023 council by-election
Tony van der Lem	None	

== Results ==
=== Mayor ===
2025 Invercargill mayoral election
Party	Candidate	Votes	%	±%
Independent	Tom Campbell	6,948	38.61	(new)
Independent	Alex Crackett	5,202	28.91	(new)
Independent	Ian Pottinger	2,322	12.90	(new)
Independent	Ria Bond	1,803	10.02	+5.44
Independent	Tom Morton	711	3.95	+2.41
Independent	Andrew Clark	291	1.62	(new)
Independent	Stevey Chernishov	229	1.27	+0.43
Independent	Gordon McCrone	66	0.37	(new)
Informal votes		75	0.42	+0.13
Blank votes		349	1.94	+0.87
Turnout		17,996	46.35	−6.84
Registered electors		38,829		
Independent gain from Lets Go Invercargill				

=== Council ===
2025 Invercargill at-large election
Party	Candidate	Votes	%	±%
Independent	Steve Broad^{†}	11,503	63.92	(new)
Independent	Alex Crackett^{†}	10,056	55.88	+24.49
Independent	Marcus Lush	8,396	46.65	(new)
Independent	Grant Dermody^{†}	8,321	46.24	+9.24
Independent	Trish Boyle^{†}	7,457	41.44	+8.94
Independent	Ria Bond^{†}	7,373	40.97	+6.51
Independent	Darren Ludlow^{†}	7,371	40.96	+2.52
Independent	Ian Pottinger	7,195	39.98	+2.89
Independent	Allan Arnold^{†}	6,105	33.92	−2.31
Independent	Andrea De Vries	5,920	32.90	(new)
Independent	Lisa Tou McNaughton	5,816	32.32	+6.08
Independent	Barry Stewart^{†}	5,710	31.73	+1.62
Independent	Ian Reeves	5,689	31.61	(new)
Independent	Lynley McKerrow	5,608	31.16	(new)
Independent	David Meades	5,414	30.08	(new)
Independent	Karl Herman	4,788	26.61	(new)
Independent	Terry King	4,691	26.07	−3.15
Independent	Chris Dawson	4,510	25.06	(new)
Independent	Jay Coote	4,137	22.99	(new)
Independent	Pania Coote	3,904	21.69	(new)
Independent	Tony Van Der Lem	3,749	20.83	(new)
Independent	Tom Morton	3,268	18.16	+5.82
Independent	Carl Heenan	2,979	16.55	(new)
Independent	Dan O'Connell	2,320	12.89	(new)
Independent	Amanda Laurie	2,128	11.82	(new)
Independent	Noel Peterson	1,301	7.23	+0.34
Independent	Carol (CJ) Jasperse	1,005	5.58	(new)
Informal votes		51	0.28	−0.14
Blank votes		132	0.73	−0.99
Turnout		17,996	46.35	−6.84
Registered electors		38,829		
Independent hold				
Independent hold				
Independent gain from Lets Go Invercargill				
Independent gain from Lets Go Invercargill				
Independent hold				
Independent hold				
Independent hold				
Independent hold				
Independent gain from Lets Go Invercargill				
Independent gain from Independent				
Independent gain from Independent				
Independent gain from Lets Go Invercargill				
^{†} incumbent
