= Ben Bell =

Mayor of Gore, New Zealand (born 1999)

5th Mayor of Gore District
- Incumbent
- Assumed office 9 November 2022
- Preceded by: Tracy Hicks

Personal details
- Born: Benjamin Ryan Bell; 11 May 1999 (age 27)
- Occupation: Business entrepreneur

Benjamin Ryan Bell (born 11 May 1999) is a New Zealand politician who is the mayor of the town of Gore in the South Island. In October 2022, Bell was elected as Gore's youngest mayor at the age of 23 years, defeating the incumbent Tracy Hicks. In mid November, the Gore District Council rejected Bell's request to hire a personal executive assistant named Shanna Crosbie. Bell subsequently went on leave after his fellow councillors submitted a requisition requesting the removal of deputy mayor Stewart MacDonell.

In May 2023, Bell's opponents abandoned an attempted vote of no confidence in his mayoral leadership. Following a mediation process involving an external facilitator, Bell and his fellow councillors mended their working relationships with the Gore District Council CEO Stephen Parry in August 2023.

== Early life and business career ==
Bell's mother is Rebecca Tayler and his biological father is Simon Bell. He grew up in Ōtaki and received his education at Paraparaumu College. When he was 12 years old, he invented a GPS-enabled wristband that allowed hospitals and visitors to trace the whereabouts of patients. In September 2016, he presented his wristband at the Medicine X conference organised by Stanford University in California. In November 2016, this invention won him the youth category of the Wellingtonian of the Year award.

During 2017, Bell worked at Ōtaki Countdown supermarket to save money for a 2018/19 northern hemisphere winter gap year in Canada, where he worked as a ski instructor despite having to learn to ski himself first. In his own words, "it was crazy... I knew the very basics." In 2019, Bell started to work at Horizons Regional Council as an environmental data analyst. In July 2021, he registered his own company—Random42 Limited—with himself as the sole director. His mother is a 49 per cent shareholder in that company. The company dealt with water-monitoring technology, portable wind turbines, and promoted Bell's wristband invention.

== First mayoral term, 2022–2025 ==
=== 2022 mayoral election ===
During the 2022 Gore mayoral election, which was held as part of the 2022 New Zealand local elections, Bell positioned himself as the "change" candidate and campaigned on fixing rural roads, water infrastructure, and promoting recycling. During his campaign, Bell reached out to both young voters via social media and canvassed older voters through the Returned Services Association and other organisations. When the full local election results were released on 13 October 2022, Bell defeated the incumbent mayor Tracy Hicks by a narrow margin of 8 votes; winning 2,371 votes to Hicks' 2,363 votes. Hicks applied for a recount but a judge rejected his bid for a recount.

=== Conflict with Gore councillors ===
In mid November, several Gore councillors including Bret Highsted, Neville Phillips, Bronwyn Reid, and Richard McPhail boycotted Bell's retreat in Cromwell for elected members. The retreat was intended as a team-building exercise to introduce Bell's leadership strategy for the next three years of his mayoral term. Highsted criticised the decision to hold the retreat in Cromwell as disrespectful to the Gore community, ratepayers, businesses and the Mataura Licensing Trust. Deputy mayor Stewart MacDonell defended the retreat, stating that there had been "good, robust discussion" among the attendees. He also claimed that Bell had unsuccessfully tried to book facilities at Gore's Croydon Lounge for the retreat.

On 22 November 2022, the Gore District Council rejected Bell's bid to hire an assistant. Councillor Bret Highsted opposed Bell's request for a personal assistant, describing it as a "vanity project". That same day, seven councillors including Richard McPhail, Reid, Highsted, Paul McPhail, Glenys Dickson, Phillips and Joe Stringer submitted a notice that they planned to meet on 15 December to vote on the removal of deputy mayor MacDonell and elect a new deputy. Following the mayoral election, Bell had designated MacDonell as deputy mayor, citing his "wealth of knowledge and experience in finances". On 24 November, the Gore District Council confirmed that Bell had gone on leave.

On 29 November, Gore District Council chief executive Stephen Parry estimated that Bell's proposed governance structure would cost the district council between NZ$140,000 and 300,000 per year. Bell's proposed governance structure would include 10 mana whenua representatives and several independent representatives. In late November, Bell returned following a three-day break and reaffirmed his commitment to his mayoral duties following a week of "challenging conversations". Following a workshop held on 1 December 2022 to discuss Bell's proposed governance structure, MacDonell resigned as deputy mayor.

In December 2022, Stuff reported that six Gore District councillors Highsted, Reid, Dickson, Phillips, Paul and Richard McPhail had expressed concerns about Bell's management style and leadership to the Council's acting chief executive Parry on 19 November. In response, Parry submitted a letter to Bell claiming that his lack of engagement with staff and misrepresentation of issues was having a demoralising effect on Council staff. Key grievances raised by the councillors included Bell and Crosbie's planning of a staff retreat, a pōwhiri at the Council's swearing-in ceremony which was organised without staff input, and issuing their own press releases without consulting the Council's communications department. Bell had defended his actions, citing Section 41A of the Local Government Act 2002 and told the councillors to refer their grievances to Parry. Bell stated he was shocked to have received Parry's letter following his swearing in but later stated he was developing a "different working relationship with staff."

In February 2023, Bell's opponent Tracy Hick's social media manager Natasha Chadwick shared several private photos of Bell following the 2022 mayoral election with several media outlets including the Otago Daily Times. Chadwick defended her actions, stating that "what he [Bell] does socially is absolutely the people's business. Chadwick had suggested that Hicks share the photos during the 2022 mayoral election but Hicks had refused. In response, Bell dismissed rumors about his sexuality. When questioned by Radio New Zealand about an Instagram photo showing a male friend kissing him on the cheek, Bell stated that "the next generation would think nothing about it." Gore councillor John Gardyne described the 2022 Gore mayoral election as one of the "dirtiest campaigns" due to the significant antagonism between Hicks' and Bell's camps.

=== Conflict with Stephen Parry and attempted vote of no confidence ===
In late March 2023, Stuff reported that Bell's relationship with chief executive Stephen Parry had deteriorated and the two were no longer on speaking terms, requiring councillor Richard McPhail to act as an intermediary. Following this controversy, long-serving councillor Bret Highsted resigned from council citing high stress levels and "unsustainable anxiety", triggering a by-election.

On 11 May 2023, Bell rejected a resignation request from seven of Gore's ten councillors including deputy mayor Keith Hovell, Richard McPhail, Stewart MacDonell, Neville Phillips, Glenys Dickson, Paul McPhail and Bronwyn Reid. The ten councillors claimed that they had lost confidence and trust in Bell's ability to act in the best interests of the council and Gore community. In response, Gore resident Sean Burke circulated a petition calling for the resignation of Gore Council chief executive Stephen Parry. Burke expressed support for Bell and claimed that Parry "presided over a bullying culture." On 16 May, the seven councillors abandoned their attempts to hold a vote of no confidence in Bell's leadership. Instead, Hovell successfully tabled an amended motion calling for the Gore District Council to work with Local Government New Zealand (LGNZ) to develop terms of reference for an independent review to restore confidence in the Council.

On 13 June 2023, Bell submitted a petition calling for the resignation of CEO Parry. The petition was rejected by his fellow councillors, with Bell being the sole supporter. According to the Otago Daily Times, the 4,800-strong petition was dominated by non-Gore residents, with Gore residents only accounting for 9% of signatures. On 21 June, Bell and his fellow councillors apologised to Parry.

On 11 July, Bell apologised to the Gore community after a Resident's Opinion Survey found only 19% had confidence in the Mayor and Gore District Council's leadership due to the recent internal conflict. On 9 August, Radio New Zealand reported that the Gore District Council had spent NZ$11,000 in hiring an external facilitator to mediate relations between Bell, the District Council, and Parry.

=== Policies and actions ===
In response to heavy rainfall and flooding in Gore during the 2023 southern New Zealand floods, Bell declared a state of emergency for the Southland Region on 21 September 2023. The following day, Bell confirmed that Gore District Council staff and the fire service had managed to save 20 buildings in the town from flooding through pumping. Bell and the Council stated that the roads were safe to travel but advised motorists to look out for flood debris.

In late November 2024, Bell and Mayor of Central Otago Tamah Alley confirmed that their two councils would partner together to deliver water services to their communities in response to rising costs and the Government's Local Water Done Well policy. Joseph Mooney, the Member of Parliament for Southland, welcomed the partnership between the Gore and Central Otago District Councils. In early October 2025, the Department of Internal Affairs approved the creation of a joint Otago-Southland water services entity called Southern Waters, which is expected to launch in July 2027.

On 21 May 2025, Bell proposed increasing the Gore District Council's rates by 6.1% as part of its long-term plan. Ultimately, the council endorsed a 9.9% base rates increase for 2026, which he opposed. As mayor, Bell had also supported asset sales as a means of reducing the council's debts. The following day, Bell confirmed that the Gore District Council would be working with Local Government New Zealand to lobby against the central government's pressure on local councils to increase rates to offset reduced government funding.

=== 2025 Gore mayoral election ===
On 22 February 2025, Bell confirmed that he would seek a second term as mayor of Gore during the 2025 Gore mayoral election. Bell was re-elected for a second term as mayor. According to preliminary results, he received 2,917 votes, defeating his sole opponent, Gore businesswoman Nicky Davis (who received 1,270 votes).

== Second term, 2025–present ==
On 19 November 2025, the Gore District Council introduced a new portfolio-based governance structure with Mayor Bell and Cr Neville Peat heading the regional relationships portfolio. In mid November 2025, Bell and Greenpeace New Zealand clashed over Gore's nitrate level measurement methodology, with the latter recording a higher level of nitrates in drinking water than the Gore Council.
