= Tom O'Byrne =

New Zealand trade unionist and politician

The Honourable Tom O'Byrne
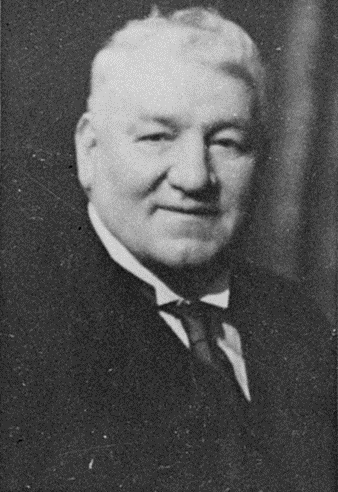

Member of the Legislative Council
- In office 22 June 1934 – 31 December 1950

Personal details
- Born: 30 August 1871 Westbury, Tasmania, Australia
- Died: 30 September 1952 (aged 81) Invercargill, New Zealand
- Party: Labour Party

Thomas Francis O'Byrne (30 August 1871 – 30 September 1952) was a New Zealand timber worker, trade unionist and politician. He was born in Westbury, Tasmania, Australia in 1871 to Catholic immigrants Ellen Esther Ryan and her farmer husband Thomas O'Byrne. From 1934 onwards, he was a member of the Legislative Council.

In 1935, he was awarded the King George V Silver Jubilee Medal.
