= 2022 Invercargill mayoral election =

2022 mayoral election in Invercargill, New Zealand

- 8 October 2022
- Turnout: 20,502
Candidate	Nobby Clark	Toni Biddle	Marcus Lush
Party	Let's Go Invercargill	Independent	Independent
Popular vote	7,357	4,408	4,376
Percentage	35.88	21.50	21.34
Mayor before election
Tim Shadbolt
Elected mayor
Nobby Clark

The 2022 Invercargill mayoral election took place on 8 October 2022 as part of the New Zealand local elections. Incumbent mayor Tim Shadbolt unsuccessfully sought a tenth term against nine other candidates, losing to his deputy Nobby Clark.

The election was conducted under the first-past-the-post voting system using the postal voting system. Voting began on 16 September and ended at noon on 8 October 2022.

== Background ==
Tim Shadbolt has been mayor of Invercargill since 1998. In May 2021, former councillor and 2013 mayoral candidate Lindsay Dow began forming a coalition to defeat Shadbolt. This followed a scandal wherein Shadbolt's driving licence was suspended and deputy mayor Nobby Clark criticized him for not being forthcoming about the reason. Shadbolt has had a history of contentious relationships with his deputy mayors, even making reference to Brutus on two occasions.

Several councillors have expressed concern about Shadbolt's ability to perform his job. An independent report into council dysfunction in November 2020 found Shadbolt's lack of leadership as a key factor. Shadbolt publicly rubbished the report, despite earlier having voted with the council to accept the findings. A follow-up report released in September 2021 noted overall improvement in the council but still dubbed Shadbolt "an unavoidable and inconvenient distraction". An informal poll conducted by the Otago Daily Times in August 2021 found that 82% of respondents felt it was time for Shadbolt to resign. In May 2022, an anonymous survey of the mayor and eleven councillors found all but one believed the mayor was not on top of key council issues.

Gary Tong, the Mayor of Southland District since 2013, announced his candidacy on 28 October 2021, having decided to run about a year prior. He had informed Shadbolt of his intentions in September. After being elected to his third term as Southland mayor in 2019, he said it would be his last. On 14 July 2022, the day before nominations were to open, Tong dropped out and said that he would instead run for re-election as Southland mayor.

Noel Peterson, a Bluff Community Board member since 2019, announced his intent to stand in late 2021, but did not officially launch his campaign until May 2022. Originally from Tauranga, where he unsuccessfully ran for mayor in 2016, he moved to Bluff in 2017. He is known as the "Green Wizard", but has said he will retire the persona while he runs for mayor. He will also run for the council.

Ian Pottinger, a city councillor since 2010, announced his candidacy on 3 May 2022. He said he would not seek re-election to the council. He had considered running in 2019, but decided the time wasn't right then. He withdrew on 8 August and decided to run for re-election to the council. He endorsed Nobby Clark.

Becs Amundsen, a city councillor since 2013, announced her candidacy on 20 May. She would have concurrently run for re-election to the council. She was appointed deputy mayor by Shadbolt in 2017. She then challenged Shadbolt for the mayoralty in 2019, but placed third. Amundsen withdrew on 8 August, citing the growing pool of candidates as her reason and stating that she did not want to contribute to the success of a "worst-case scenario" candidate. She will continue to run for re-election to the council.

Nobby Clark, a city councillor since 2019 and deputy mayor since 2020, announced his candidacy on 30 May. He will not seek re-election to the council. He was the highest polling candidate in 2019, with 10,802 votes (more than the mayor with 9,672). He had previously said a year prior that he would not run for any office, and had even intended to resign early as deputy in March before being convinced not to by Shadbolt. Prior to being elected to council, Clark was spokesman of the Invercargill Ratepayers Advocacy Group. Upon Clark's announcement, Shadbolt once again decried the council as toxic and put out a plea to the public that if they won't re-elect him, they should elect someone completely new. In June, Clark announced the formation of a group of council candidates he would run alongside, unusual for local Invercargill elections. The group would mostly consist of new candidates, though incumbent councillor Allan Arnold was among them. This ticket was revealed in July to be called "Let's Go Invercargill".

Darren Ludlow, a city councillor since 1998 and deputy mayor from 2012 to 2017, announced his candidacy on 7 July. He previously contested the 2019 mayoral election and finished second, 3000 votes behind the mayor, he was also second highest polling councillor .

Ria Bond, a former New Zealand First MP, announced her candidacy on 22 July. She will also run for council. She had intended to contest the 2019 mayoral election, but her registration 15 minutes before the deadline was rejected because the correct address of one of her nominators was not on the electoral roll.

Tom Morton, a local "TikTok star", announced his candidacy in July 2022. He will also run for council. Morton moved to Invercargill in January 2022 and started posting TikTok videos in April, amassing nearly 5,500 followers as of 1 August.

Toni Biddle, a former city councillor from 2016 to 2020, announced her candidacy on 3 August. She will not run for council. Biddle served as deputy mayor from 2019 until her sudden resignation from council in 2020. She had intended to contest the 2019 mayoral election, but later withdrew.

Stevey Chernishov, a teacher at Aurora College, announced his candidacy on 10 August. He will also run for the Southland District and Queenstown Lakes District councils. Chernishov previously contested the 2019 mayoral election, coming last place.

Marcus Lush, a radio presenter and city councillor since 2021, announced his candidacy on 10 August. He pledged to continue his radio show if elected, as he has done as a councillor.

Tim Shadbolt, who has long maintained his intent to run for another term, submitted his nomination on 11 August and notably also filed to run for the council, the first time he has done so since the 1990s. In his candidate statement, he says it would be his final term. On 31 August, Shadbolt stated that he did not expect to win, based on various informal polls, and would scale back his campaign as a result. He subsequently did not attend any candidate forums or debates.

== Candidates ==
=== Declared candidates ===
- Toni Biddle, former Deputy Mayor
- Ria Bond, former New Zealand First MP
- Steve Chernishov, teacher and 2019 mayoral candidate
- Nobby Clark, incumbent Deputy Mayor
- Darren Ludlow, Invercargill City Councillor, former Deputy Mayor of Invercargill, 2019 mayoral candidate
- Marcus Lush, Invercargill City Councillor and radio presenter
- Tom Morton, TikToker
- Noel Peterson, Bluff Community Board member, Tauranga mayoral candidate in 2016, Green Party candidate for Tauranga in 2005 general election
- Tim Shadbolt, incumbent Mayor of Invercargill
- Jacqueline Walter

=== Withdrawn candidates ===
- Becs Amundsen, Invercargill City Councillor, former Deputy Mayor of Invercargill, 2019 mayoral candidate
- Ian Pottinger, Invercargill City Councillor
- Gary Tong, Mayor of Southland District

=== Declined to be candidates ===
- Lindsay Abbott, Invercargill City Councillor
- Allan Arnold, Invercargill City Councillor
- Alex Crackett, Invercargill City Councillor
- Peter Kett, Invercargill City Councillor
- Graham Lewis, Invercargill City Councillor
- John Prendergast, former Community Trust South chief executive
- Penny Simmonds, National MP
- Nigel Skelt, Invercargill City Councillor
- Lesley Soper, Invercargill City Councillor and former Labour list MP
- Melissa Vining, cancer charity advocate

== Results ==
The following table gives the election results:

2022 Invercargill mayoral election
Party	Candidate	Votes	%	±%
Independent	Nobby Clark	7,357	35.88	
Independent	Toni Biddle	4,408	21.50	
Independent	Marcus Lush	4,376	21.34	
Independent	Darren Ludlow	2,089	10.18	−21.9
Independent	Tim Shadbolt	958	4.67	−43.63
Independent	Ria Bond	610	2.97	
Independent	Tom Morton	323	1.57	
Independent	Steve Chernishov	176	0.85	−2.26
Independent	Jacqueline Walter	114	0.55	
Independent	Noel Peterson	91	0.44	
Majority		2,549	14.38	−1.84
Turnout		20,502		
