= Dugald Poppelwell =

New Zealand lawyer (1863-1939)

Dugald Louis Poppelwell
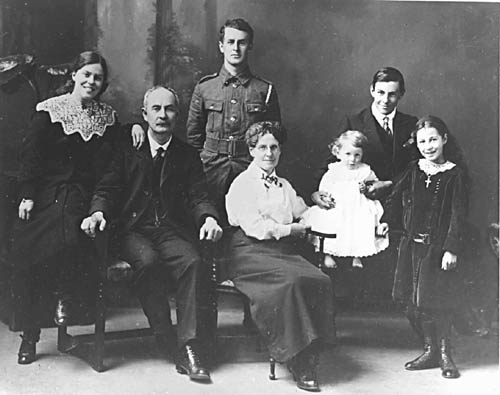
- Poppelwell and family (Poppelwell is second from left to right)
- Born: 2 July 1863; Otago, New Zealand
- Died: 23 September 1939 (aged 76); Gore, New Zealand
- Occupation(s): Lawyer, Mayor, City Councilman, Justice of the Peace
- Spouse: Nora Poppelwell
- Children: William, Harold, Dugald, Moana and Mary Poppelwell
- Parent: William Poppelwell (Father) Catherine Robertson McLachlan (Mother)

Dugald Louis Poppelwell (2 July 1863 – 23 September 1939) was a New Zealand lawyer, local politician and conservationist. He was born in Tokomairiro (now Milton), Otago, New Zealand in 1863.

== Early life ==
Poppelwell was the tenth of twelve children of his parents, William Poppelwell, a Scottish mariner turned farmer, and his wife, Catherine Robertson McLachlan. His family's house was known for their hospitality, as well as being a centre for local Catholics. He attended the Christian Brothers' Boys' School in Dunedin, and was awarded the Bishop Moran's Scholarship in 1878. He later became a law clerk in the office of Donald Reid in Milton. He was also appointed lieutenant in the Bruce Rifle Volunteers in 1887. From 1889 to 1891 he studied law at the University of Otago, and once he was admitted as a lawyer, he moved to Gore to establish a practice there.

== Career ==
Poppelwell was a liberal in politics, and was invited to stand for Parliament several times. He refused every time, but was elected to the Gore borough council in 1893. In 1895 he was elected mayor of Gore, as well as being elected for the borough council again from 1900 to 1903. He then served as mayor four more times from 1904 to 1931. After he had served as mayor, he was made a justice of the peace. Poppelwell was largely responsible for many public works in the city, including setting aside 200 acres of the undisposed part of Croydon Bush for a public reserve. He was president also of the Southland District Law Society, and in 1935 was awarded the King George V Silver Jubilee Medal.

== Botany ==
Poppelwell was also an amateur botanist, and spent some of his free time collecting plants. He had been interested in horticulture and conservation for some time, and his interest was greatly increased by reading Manual of the New Zealand Flora by T.F. Cheeseman in 1906, and also by Plants of New Zealand by R.M. Laing and E.W. Blackwell.

== Personal life ==
Poppelwell met Nora Green in Gore around 1892, and they were married on 10 April 1894. Of their eight children, three died young. The five who survived were William, Harold, Dugald, Moana and Mary. Moana and Mary both became Sisters of Mercy.
