= Marcus Lush =

New Zealand politician and television and radio presenter (born 1965)

Member of the Invercargill City Council
- Incumbent
- Assumed office 11 October 2025
- In office 17 February 2021 – 14 October 2022
- Preceded by: Toni Biddle

Personal details
- Born: July 3, 1965 (age 61) Auckland, New Zealand
- Spouse: Vanessa Underwood
- Occupation: Broadcaster
- Known for: Off the Rails: A Love Story, Breakfast with Marcus Lush

Marcus Lush (born 3 July 1965) is a New Zealand radio and television presenter and local-body politician. He hosts Marcus Lush Nights, a nationwide weeknight talkback programme on Newstalk ZB, and is known for presenting travel documentary series including Off the Rails: A Love Story, Ice, South and North. He is a member of the Invercargill City Council.

== Broadcasting ==
He made his first footsteps into television in the 1990s as a reporter co-presenting TV2's Newsnight alongside Simon Dallow and Alison Mau, but it was a 2003 episode of travel show, Intrepid Journeys, that set him on a new broadcasting path. Since then the longtime talkback radio host has won acclaim and awards for Off the Rails, which chronicles his journey along New Zealand's railway lines, and he spent a month in Antarctica for the series, Ice. In December 2008 Lush began work on a new television series, South, in which he explores Southland and Otago. South went to air in August 2009.

Lush was raised largely in Auckland, the fourth son of a printer and a speech therapist. He began his long career in talkback by presenting a show on student station Radio B (now 95bFM), where he worked alongside Eating Media Lunch co-creator Paul Casserly. At the age of 24, he went on to take over the graveyard talkback shift on 1ZB. During the late 1990s, he hosted the breakfast show on Auckland's 91ZM and from 2000 it was heard nationwide, except in Wellington and Christchurch. Lush's ZM programme was axed in 2001 when the 91ZM Wellington breakfast show hosted by Polly and Grant took over. In the early 2000s, Lush also appeared as a panellist on How's Life?.

Lush moved to Southland in 2002 to host the breakfast show on Foveaux FM, but left the station in 2004, and in 2005 began presenting an evening talkback programme on the newly established Radio Live. In 2007, he then became breakfast host on Radio Live. In 2014 it was announced Lush would come back to ZB and in January 2016 he started his new talkback programme, Marcus Lush Nights, broadcasting nationwide every weeknight on Newstalk ZB from 8pm to midnight.

Television shows presented by Lush include Newsnight, Off the Rails: A Love Story, South and North.

== Politics ==
Lush was a candidate at a 2021 by-election for the Invercargill City Council caused by the resignation of deputy mayor Toni Biddle. He stated that he would continue Marcus Lush Nights even if elected. He won the election in a landslide, winning more than half the votes counted. On 10 August 2022, Lush announced he would contest the 2022 Invercargill mayoral election. He again promised to continue his radio show if elected. On 14 October 2022 the official declaration of results for the Invercargill City Council showed Marcus Lush placing third place in the mayoralty election whilst not seeking election to council.

Lush again ran for council in the 2025 local elections, gaining election to the City Council.

== See also ==
- List of New Zealand television personalities
