= Ria Bond =

New Zealand politician

Member of the Invercargill City Council
- Incumbent
- Assumed office 14 October 2022

Member of the New Zealand Parliament for New Zealand First party list
- In office 28 April 2015 – 23 September 2017
- Preceded by: Winston Peters

Personal details
- Born: Ria Iris Daphne Shortland; 1976 (age 49–50) Palmerston North, New Zealand
- Relations: James Hēnare (great-uncle), Tau Henare, Peeni Henare
- Children: Two

Ria Iris Daphne Bond (née Shortland; born 1976) is a New Zealand politician and former hairdresser. She was appointed to the House of Representatives as a New Zealand First list MP following Winston Peters winning the March 2015 Northland by-election. She now serves as an Invercargill City councillor after an unsuccessful bid for the 2022 Invercargill mayoral election but a successful attempt to obtain a seat on the city council.

== Early life and family ==
Born in Palmerston North in 1976, Bond was born into a presumably abusive family, and was put into foster care a total of five times. She stated in her maiden speech, "Although the world was shocked by the movie Once Were Warriors, I was living it", indicating an abusive upbringing. Bond attended Highbury Primary School (now known as Somerset Crescent School) and Queen Elizabeth College. She has two children, is half-Scottish and half-Māori (of Ngāti Hine and Ngāpuhi descent), and is the great-niece of Sir James Hēnare, the commanding officer of the Māori Battalion by the end of World War II.

== Hairdressing and national boards ==
Bond was a hairdresser in Invercargill and served as president of the New Zealand Association of Registered Hairdressers, representing 8,000 owners and operators (2006–2012). She also had a dual role as a director on the Hairdressing Industry Training Organisation, which included being a New Zealand Qualifications Authority governance and advisory panel member.

== Political career ==
New Zealand Parliament
Years	Term	Electorate	List	Party
2015–2017	51st	List	12	NZ First

Bond joined New Zealand First in 2011 and was elected to the party's national board in 2012. She left her hairdressing salon in August 2014, just prior to the 2014 New Zealand general election, when she stood in the Invercargill electorate; this was her first election contest. She placed third in that election and was 12th on the party's list, with New Zealand First winning 11 list seats. Following the election, Bond moved to Wainuiomata, working at Parliament as an executive assistant to MPs Richard Prosser and Mahesh Bindra.

When Peters won the Northland by-election on 28 March 2015 and became an electorate MP, Bond was next in line and became a list MP for her party. Bond was sworn in on 28 April 2015. On 6 May 2015, Bond became a member of the Commerce Select Committee.

She left Parliament after the 2017 New Zealand general election, as New Zealand First did not receive enough votes for her to make it back into Parliament; she then returned to Southland.

On 15 April 2019, Bond announced her candidacy for the 2019 Invercargill mayoral election. However her registration 15 minutes before the deadline was rejected because the correct address of one of her nominators was not on the electoral roll. On 22 July 2022, she announced her candidacy for the 2022 Invercargill mayoral election. She was unsuccessful in the mayoral election but did win a seat on the city council.

Bond ran unsuccessfully for the Invercargill mayoralty again in the 2025 local elections, but retained her seat as a councillor.

In 2025, Bond took part in the unofficial cross-party People's Select Committee, led by Marilyn Waring, which investigated the pay equity changes by the National government.
