= Gore District Council =

Territorial authority of New Zealand

Coordinates: 46.1025554°S 168.939684°E

Type
- Type: Unicameral of Gore District, New Zealand
- Term limits: None

History
- Founded: 6 March 1989

Leadership
- Mayor: Ben Bell
- Deputy mayor: Joe Stringer

Structure
- Seats: 12 (1 mayor, 8 ward seats, 3 other seats)
- Length of term: 3 years

Website
- goredc.govt.nz

Gore District Council is the territorial authority for the Gore District of New Zealand.

The council is led by the mayor of Gore, who is currently Ben Bell. There are also eight ward councillors and three councillors elected at large.

== Composition ==
=== Councillors ===
Councillors for the 2025-2028 term are:

- Mayor: Ben Bell
- District-wide ward: Joe Stringer (deputy mayor), Torrone Smith, Neville Phillips
- Gore ward: Mel Cupit, Paul McPhail, Andy Fraser, Robert McKenzie, Donna Bruce
- Gore rural ward: John Gardyne, Stewart MacDonell
- Mataura ward: Nicky Coats

=== Community boards ===
- Mataura Community Board: Steven Dixon, Michelle Hamilton, Tanya Rowling, Laurel Turnbull

== History ==
The council was established in 1989, directly replacing the Gore and Mataura Borough Councils and part of Southland County Council (established in 1885.) as the Gore District, New Zealand

In 2020, the council had 334 staff, including 28 earning more than $100,000. According to the Taxpayers' Union lobby group, residential rates averaged $2,163.
