= Mayor of Gore =

- Incumbent; Ben Bell since 2022
- Style: His Worship
- Term length: Three years, renewable
- Inaugural holder: Thomas Green
- Formation: 1885
- Deputy: Joe Stringer
- Salary: $112,010
- Website: Official website

The mayor of Gore officiates over the Gore District Council. Prior to local government reorganisation in 1989, the mayor of Gore officiated over the Gore Borough.

The current mayor is Ben Bell.

== List of office holders ==
=== Gore Borough ===
	Name	Portrait	Term of office	Notes
1	Thomas Green		1885–1886	
2	John MacGibbon		1886–1887	
3	Ian S. Simson		1887–1888	
4	James Beattie		1888–1889	
(3)	Ian S. Simson		1889–1890	
5	Alfred Dolamore		1890	
(2)	John MacGibbon		1890–1892	
(3)	Ian S. Simson		1892–1893	
6	William Macara		1893–1894	
7	Thomas Brewer		1894–1895	
8	Dugald Poppelwell		1895–1896	
(4)	James Beattie		1896–1897	
9	James Copland		1897–1898	
10	Duncan McFarlane		1898–1899	
11	John Ballantine		1899–1901	
12	Archibald MacGibbon		1901–1902	
(10)	Duncan McFarlane		1902–1903	
(4)	James Beattie		1903–1904	
(8)	Dugald Poppelwell		1904–1906	
(12)	Archibald MacGibbon		1906–1910	
(8)	Dugald Poppelwell		1910–1913	
13	David McDougall		1913–1914	
(10)	Duncan McFarlane		1914–1915	
(13)	David McDougall		1915–1919	
14	Andrew Martin		1919–1921	
(13)	David McDougall		1921–1923	
(8)	Dugald Poppelwell		1923–1927	
(13)	David McDougall		1927–1929	
(8)	Dugald Poppelwell		1929–1931	
15	Alexander Newman		1931–1956	
16	Wilson C. Campbell		1956–1959	
17	W. G. Mackay		1959–	
	Hans Charles Hankey			
	J. C. Barron		?–1965	
	J. C. McLeod		1965–?	
	Ivan Elder		–1980	
	Hallam Smith		1980–1986	
	Gabriel Farry		1986–1989	

=== Gore District ===
	Name	Portrait	Term of office
1	Ian Tulloch		1989–1995
2	Mary Ogg		1995–2001
3	Owen O'Connor		2001–2004
4	Tracy Hicks		2004–2022
5	Ben Bell		2022–present
