= Water Services Reform Programme =

New Zealand Government water infrastructure reform programme

Official logo of the Water Services Reform Programme.

The Water Services Reform Programme (formerly known as Three Waters) was a public infrastructure restructuring programme launched by the Sixth Labour Government to centralise the management of water supply and sanitation in New Zealand. It originally proposed shifting control of stormwater, drinking water and wastewater management from the country's 67 local councils to several new publicly-owned regional entities by July 2024. Details of the proposed reforms were announced in October 2021. The Three Waters reforms were criticised by several mayors and the opposition National and ACT parties.

From November 2021, a working group of mayors and Māori representatives reviewed issues of representation, governance and accountability, and reported back in March 2022 with 47 recommendations. In April 2022, the government accepted 44 of the recommendations. Key changes to the original proposals included providing non-financial shareholdings for councils in the four new water entities, and increased legislative protection against future privatisation of the water assets. Regional representative groups would be established as part of the governance structure, with equal representation of council and tangata whenua. These representative groups would appoint the members of the boards of the four water entities, based on skill and competence.

In April 2023, the Government announced a major overhaul of the Three Waters programme, renaming it the Water Services Reform Programme. The proposed four water services entities were expanded into ten entities. These entities will still retain the split governance structure consisting of both local council and mana whenua representatives.

In late 2023, the newly-formed National-led coalition Government confirmed that it would repeal the Three Waters legislative framework in favour of a new regime that would favour local council control and ownership of water assets and infrastructure. On 14 February 2024, the National-led government passed urgent legislation repealing the previous Labour Government's Three Waters legislation.

== History ==
=== Three Waters Review ===
In mid 2017, the Fifth National Government launched a review of the regulation and supply arrangements of drinking water, wastewater and stormwater (three waters). This review ran in parallel with the later stages of the Inquiry into the Havelock North drinking water contamination of 2016. The Three Waters Review was published in January 2019.

In 2019, the Sixth Labour Government announced plans for regulatory changes in response to the Three Waters Review, including:

- establish a new, dedicated drinking water regulator
- extend regulatory coverage to all drinking water suppliers, except individual household self-suppliers
- provide a multi-barrier approach to drinking water treatment and safety
- strengthen government oversight and stewardship of wastewater and stormwater services
- provide transitional arrangements of up to five years to allow water suppliers to adjust to the regulations.

=== Water services legislation ===
The Taumata Arowai – the Water Services Regulator Bill was introduced to Parliament on 12 December 2019. The Government indicated a separate Water Services bill would be proposed at a later date to give effect to decisions to implement system-wide reforms to the regulation of drinking water and source water, and targeted reforms to improve the regulation and performance of wastewater and stormwater networks.

=== Mahuta's reform proposals ===
On 28 January 2020, Nanaia Mahuta, the Minister of Local Government, released Cabinet papers and minutes setting out intentions for reform of service delivery and funding arrangements for the three waters services nationwide.

The Cabinet paper referred to two key challenges facing New Zealand's three waters service delivery: affordability and capability. The paper referred to the cumulative effect of increasing capital and operating costs to meet infrastructure challenges, and constrained sector capability to address key public health and environmental challenges. It noted that these challenges are particularly acute for smaller council and non-council drinking water suppliers, with smaller ratepayer and consumer funding bases.

The paper described the current situation (in most regions), where individual councils supply and manage water systems and services alongside their other duties. There was specific reference to Wellington Water (which manages the water assets of six councils) as an example of one approach to service delivery that had successfully built capability through the scale of operations. However, the paper also noted that Wellington Water currently has no ability to make trade-offs between operating and capital expenditure, nor can it cross-subsidise between owners or ratepayers in different districts.

A transition is envisaged to a next stage where water services are fully 'ring-fenced' from other council services, with charges for ratepayers specifically identifying the water services in their rates. At this stage, councils may share service provision with other councils. The final stage envisaged in the paper is the full transfer of ownership of the water assets to a new entity governed by an independent board of directors, and with specialist employees who would focus on water services.

The Government indicated that it would work in partnership with local government to explore options for transitioning councils to new service delivery arrangements, seeking safer, more affordable and reliable three waters services. The first step was to support the investigation of opportunities within regions for collaborative approaches to water service delivery.

=== Initial plans for implementation ===
==== Hawke's Bay investigation ====
As an initial step towards implementing the proposed reforms, on 27 January 2020 the Government announced funding of $1.55m for an investigation of opportunities for greater coordination in three waters service delivery across the Hawke's Bay region, involving five councils: Napier City Council, Hastings District Council, Central Hawke's Bay District Council, Wairoa District Council and Hawke's Bay Regional Council.

==== Otago and Southland investigation ====
In May 2020, ten councils in the Otago and Southland regions commenced the development of a business case for a collaborative approach to managing the three waters assets. The business case was expected to take about eight months and would be followed by public consultation. The Government agreed to cover half of the cost, with a deadline for councils to consider changes to service delivery models by the end of 2021. The ten councils involved in the investigation were Dunedin City Council, Central Otago District Council, Clutha District Council, Queenstown Lakes District Council, Waitaki District Council, Otago Regional Council, Gore District Council, Invercargill City Council, Southland District Council and Environment Southland.

=== Advertising campaign ===
In late June 2021, the New Zealand Government launched a NZ$3.5 million multimedia advertising campaign called "Better Water is Better for Everyone" to promote its Three Waters reform programme. The advertising campaign was criticised by several mayors and local body councillors and officials including Mayor of Waimate Craig Rowley, Mayor of Waitaki Gary Kircher, Tasman District Council engineering services manager Richard Kirby, Councillors Kit Maling, David Ogilvie for alleged sensationalism, inaccuracies, and for portraying local councils' management of water resources in a negative light. In response, the Department of Internal Affairs reaffirmed the Government's commitment to working with local councils on the Three Waters reform programme. In addition, $500,000 was set aside by the Government for the development, maintenance, and hosting of the Three Waters reform programme's website.

By October 2021, the Advertising Standards Authority had received a total of 48 complaints about the Three Waters reform programme. The watchdog ruled that the advertisements were neither misleading or offensive in the context of advocacy advertising.

== Launch ==
Three Waters reform programme's logo

On 27 October 2021, Mahuta unveiled the Government's Three Waters reform programme. The plan involves the mandatory transfer of the management of stormwater, drinking water and wastewater from the country's 67 local councils and territorial bodies to four new water entities, with the goal of improving the quality and lowering the cost of water utilities. The Government planned to start creating these four new entities in late 2021, and they would assume control of water utilities in July 2024. Though the Government had initially stated that the Three Waters programme would be optional for local government bodies, they subsequently decided to mandate in July 2021.

During the announcement, Mahuta also created a working group to advise the Government on how the four water entities' governance would work. According to Mahuta, the group's findings would be placed into a supplementary order paper (SOP) to amend legislation creating the new entities that would manage the three waters systems. Despite its unpopularity with local councils and the public, the Government persisted with the Three Waters reform programme.

On 9 December 2021, the Government postponed until 2022, the introduction of legislation creating the new entities that would manage the Three Waters systems. The Government confirmed that it would wait until the working group had finished their findings, before introducing the new legislation. In mid-December, Mahuta argued that the Three Waters reform should proceed, despite opposition from several local governments, due to the under-investment in the country's water infrastructure. Mahuta also urged party leaders to prevent the privatisation of New Zealand's water assets, entrenching a safeguard requiring a supermajority of 75% of MP's support before a water asset could be sold.

=== Review by working group ===
A working group of mayors and Māori representatives was formed in November 2021, to review the planned reform programme, focussing on improvements in the three most contentious aspects of the original proposal: representation, governance and accountability. The working group reported back in March 2022, with 47 recommendations. On 29 April 2022, Mahuta announced that the Government had accepted 44 of the recommendations, with three that needed some further work. One of the key changes was that councils would be given non-financial shareholdings in the new water entities, with one share per 50,000 of population, and that there would be additional legislative protection against future privatisation. Co-governance will be established in regional representative groups, where there will be an equal number of seats for mana whenua and councils. These regional oversight groups will appoint the members of the boards of the four water entities, based on skill and competence. The regional representative groups will have a role in setting strategic direction, but will not be involved in operational matters.

=== Legislative entrenchment ===
On 2 June 2022, Mahuta introduced the Water Services Entities Bill as the first of several new bills to entrench the three water reforms in law. The Water Services Entities Bill would establish the four regional water services entities which would take over management of water infrastructure from the 67 local councils. Under the proposed law, councils would retain ownership of their water assets through a "community share" arrangement but effective control would pass to the four new water services entities, which would have both community and Māori iwi/tribal representation. Mahuta also claimed that there would be safeguards against privatisation. Mahuta also confirmed that further legislation would be introduced to facilitate the transfer of assets and liabilities from local authorities to the Water Services Entities, integrate entities into other regulatory systems, and to cover economic regulation of the water services entities and ensure consumer protection. A National Transition Unit would oversee the establishment of the new water services entities over the next two years.

On 23 November 2022, the Labour Government decided to push the Water Services Entities Bill under urgency to compensate for the loss of a week's worth of parliamentary sitting time caused by Queen Elizabeth II's death on 9 September 2022. The Bill passed its third and final reading on 7 December. Labour was able to pass the Bill without the support of other parties due to its majority status in the House, an unprecedented occurrence in New Zealand since MMP came into force. While National and ACT parties opposed the Bill due to their opposition to co-governance and centralisation, the Green and Māori parties opposed the Bill on the grounds that it lacked sufficient anti-privatisation safeguards and failed to promote co-governance.

Following the passage of the Water Services Entities Act 2022, Mahuta introduced two bills to further entrench the Three Waters reform programme: the Water Services Economic Efficiency and Consumer Protection Bill and the Water Services Legislation Bill, which passed their first readings on 13 December 2022. The Water Services Legislation Bill included 130 pages of amendments to the Water Services Entities Act. The new legislation includes provisions for charging for water services, institutes a system of fines for breaching water restrictions and disconnecting from stormwater systems, facilitate information-sharing between the water entities and councils, facilitates cooperation between the water services entities and mana whenua, clarifies the ownership of stormwater systems beneath roads, and outlines what rights the water services entities when working on different kinds of land including roads, railways, and marae.

On 16 August 2023, the Water Services Entities Amendment Act 2023 passed its third reading. The bill increased the number of water services entities from four to ten, and delayed the start of the entities from 2024 to 2026. While the Labour and Green parties supported the bill, it was opposed by the National, ACT and Māori parties. National and ACT have vowed to repeal the entire Three Waters reforms while retaining the water regulator Taumata Arowai.

On 23 August, the Government passed two final bills entrenching the Water Services Reform Programme: the Water Services Economic Efficiency and Consumer Protection Act 2023 and Water Services Legislation Act 2023. The first bill sets up an economic regulation regime overseen by the Commerce Commission as a watchdog over the water services entities' quality and efficiency, and mandates information disclosures. While the Economic Efficiency and Consumer Protection Act was supported by the Labour and Green parties, it was opposed by the National, ACT, and Māori parties. The second bill outlines the duties, functions, and powers of the new water services entities that would come into effect in 2026. The Water Services Legislation Bill was passed with the sole support of the Labour Party. National and ACT have opposed the water services reform programme and vowed to repeal them if elected into government following the 2023 New Zealand general election.

=== Funding ===
On 19 July 2022, the Government announced that it would give the 67 local councils a total of NZ$44 million to help them transition to the new Three Waters system. The Government had already allocated NZ$2.5 billion to compensate local councils for the reforms including infrastructure and other "wellbeing" investments. Associate Local Government Minister Kieran McAnulty stated that each local council would receive NZ$350,000 over the next 12 months. The opposition National and ACT parties' local government spokespersons Simon Watts and Simon Court described the funding as a "bribe" and a waster of taxpayer money.

== 2023 revamp ==
On 1 February 2023, Kieran McAnulty succeeded Mahuta as Minister of Local Government, which oversees the Three Waters reform programme. After succeeding Jacinda Ardern as Prime Minister in late January, the incoming Chris Hipkins had announced a cabinet reshuffle on 31 January 2023. Hipkins stated that the change was intended to allow Mahuta to focus on her foreign affairs portfolio but denied that it was motivated by controversy around the Three Waters programme. He also confirmed that the Labour Government would continue implementing the Three Waters reforms.

On 8 February, Hipkins reiterated that the Government would continue with the Three Waters reforms, arguing that disasters such as the 2023 North Island floods demonstrated the limits of infrastructure and the need for reform. However, he stated that the Government would be considering whether some of the Three Waters changes would be fit for purpose. Hipkins confirmed that Cabinet had asked McAnulty to consult with local government, Māori and the public and report back on options for "refocusing the reforms."

On 13 April 2023, the Government announced a major overhaul of the programme, renaming it the Water Services Reform Programme. The proposed four water services entities were expanded into ten entities. These entities be owned by local councils on behalf of the public, and their boundaries will be based on existing regional boundaries. Each entity will be run by a professional board, with members being appointed based on competency and skill. These boards will still retain the split governance structure consisting of both local council and mana whenua representatives. According to Local Government Minister McAnulty also announced that the entities are expected to start operating from 1 July 2026.

== Repeal ==
On 27 November 2023, the newly-formed National-led coalition government announced that it would scrap the Three Waters reforms as part of its plans to repeal several of the previous Labour Government's policies. The Government's announcement was welcomed by Mayor of Manawatu and co-chair of the Communities 4 Local Democracy group Helen Worboys and Mayor of Hastings Sandra Hazlehurst, who welcomed the Governments "stop work" order on transition activities and said that the water reforms were unaffordable for local councils respectively.

On 14 December 2023, the Minister of Local Government Simeon Brown confirmed that the Government would introduce new legislation in 2024 to repeal the Three Waters legislation with the goal of restoring council ownership and control of water assets. Brown reaffirmed the National-led coalition government's commitment to addressing New Zealand's water infrastructural challenges and implementing a new regime that he claimed would "recognise the importance of local decision making" and give flexibility to local communities and councils. On 21 December 2023, Newsroom reported that a letter from Brown to councils confirmed that Government planned to finance water and wastewater infrastructure by a new type of financially separate council-owned organisation. Instead of the ten proposed water service entities, local councils would be responsible for complying with water regulation rules and water infrastructural investment.

On 14 February 2024, the National-led government passed the Water Services Acts Repeal Act 2024 under urgency, repealing Labour's various Three Waters laws. The repeal bill was supported by the National, ACT and New Zealand First parties but was opposed by the Labour, Green parties, and Te Pāti Māori. During the third reading, Labour MP Willie Jackson claimed that former Local Government Minister and Three Waters architect Nanaia Mahuta had been subject to intense racist vilification. Similar criticism was echoed by Labour's Local Government spokesperson McAnulty, who claimed that the repeal of Three Waters would lead to a rise in local councils' rates and debt.

Local Government Minister Brown confirmed that the Government would introduce two new laws between 2024 and 2025 to roll out its own "Local Water Done Well" programme, which he claimed would give local communities and councils greater control over their water services and infrastructure. The National-led government also announced that same week that these new laws would allow local councils to voluntarily form their own water services groupings and council-controlled organisations similar to Wellington Water and Auckland's Watercare Services.

== Reactions ==
=== Advocacy groups ===
The farming advocacy group Groundswell NZ has voiced opposition to the Three Waters programme, claiming that it was part of a "tsunami" of unworkable government regulations and alleging that it was the theft of the assets of council ratepayers. In December 2021, the group sponsored a petition calling for the Three Waters programme to be scrapped, which attracted 3,000 signatures by 15 December.

In June 2022, the New Zealand Taxpayers' Union and Groundswell organised a nationwide "roadshow" to rally opposition against the Three Waters reforms. They toured 36 cities and towns including Christchurch, Alexandra, and Invercargill.

=== Government departments and public servants ===
The New Zealand Infrastructure Commission published an opinion piece in May 2020 supporting the reform of service delivery in the three waters sector nationwide. The chief executive advocated consolidation of asset management and service delivery functions from multiple councils into much larger entities. The main benefits would be to capture economies of scale and free up councils from the specialist technical requirements of managing utility services.

In late February 2023, Te Whatu Ora (Health New Zealand) chair Rob Campbell criticised National's proposal to scrap Three Waters in a LinkedIn post and accused Luxon of "dog whistling" on the issue of co-governance. Campbell's remarks were criticised by several National and ACT MPs including Simeon Brown and David Seymour, who accused him of breaching the Public Service Commission's policy requiring the directors of Crown entities to remain politically impartial. Campbell defended his remarks, stating that they were made in his capacity as a private citizen and rejected suggestions that he had violated the Commission's political impartiality policy. On 27 February, Prime Minister Chris Hipkins criticised Campbell's Three Waters remarks as "inappropriate." On 28 February, Health Minister Ayesha Verrall used her discretionary powers under section 36 of the Crown Entities Act 2004 to relieve Campbell of his position as head of Te Whatu Ora. Though Campbell had apologised to Luxon and Verrall, the latter had demanded that he resign by 10:30 am on 28 February. Campbell had refused to resign and defended his right to criticise National's Three Waters policy. On 2 March, Environment Minister David Parker removed Campbell from his positions as chair and board member of the Environmental Protection Authority (EPA) in response to Campbell's Three Waters remarks.

=== Local and regional councils ===
==== 2021 ====
In April 2021, the mayor of the small Hawke's Bay town of Wairoa expressed concerns that the transfer of the three waters assets from local councils into large regional entities would have serious consequences for local government.

In early September, Invercargill's deputy mayor Nobby Clark submitted a notice of motion that the Invercargill City Council advise the Government that it would not be making any decision on the Three Waters issue until it had consulted the local community. This notice of motion was supported by Mayor of Invercargill Tim Shadbolt. Clark's motion did not pass due to a six-to-six tie.

On 9 September, Mayor of Dunedin Aaron Hawkins published an op-ed column in the Otago Daily Times expressing concerns about the Three Waters programme's financial benefits, local consultation and the lack of safeguards against privatisation. However, Hawkins also objected to some opponents' objections to Māori iwi (tribes) being involved in the decision-making process.

In late October, the Government's decision to centralize water utilities and services was criticised by several local councils and mayors including Mayor of Auckland Phil Goff, Mayor of Christchurch Lianne Dalziel, Mayor of Hastings Sandra Hazlehurst, Mayor of the Far North District John Carter, Mayor of Dunedin Hawkins, and Mayor of Wellington Andy Foster.

In mid-November, the Whangārei District Council, Timaru District Council and Waimakariri District Council launched legal proceedings in the Wellington High Court seeking a judgement about the meaning of council "ownership" of the three waters assets under the planned reforms. By 16 November, the Wairoa District Council and the Napier City Council passed motions to sign "memorandums of understanding" with "partner councils" to oppose the Three Waters reform model. The New Zealand Herald reported that over 30 councils were prepared to sign the MOUs.

In mid-December, the "Communities 4 Local Democracy He hapori mō te Manapori” group converged on Parliament and met with politicians to express their opposition to the Three Waters programme. The group represented 23 mayors and local councils including Manawatū District Council Mayor Helen Worboys, the Christchurch City Council, and the Waimate District Council. The delegation met with representatives from various political parties, including the governing Labour and National parties. The "Communities 4 Local Democracy" group had emerged in response to the local government advocacy body Local Government New Zealand not reflecting the views of their membership on the issue. However, the Communities group did not include any councils from Otago and Southland. The Invercargill City Council had voted against joining the group due to the $15,000 contribution fee. Dunedin Mayor Hawkins said incorrectly that the Dunedin City Council (DCC) had declined to join the group since its rules would have required Dunedin residents to fund what he regarded as a futile legal action.

==== 2022 ====
On 23 February 2022, the Dunedin City Council voted to join "Communities 4 Local Democracy" by a margin of eight to seven. By that time, the number of local authorities involved in the advocacy group had risen to 28. In response to the DCC's decision to join "Communities 4 Local Democracy," two local Māori runanga (tribal councils) Kati Huirapa ki Puketeraki and Te Runanga o Otakou withdrew from their partnership with the city council; citing a breakdown in their relationship. On 29 March, the DCC voted by a margin of seven to six to reverse their earlier decision to join "Communities 4 Local Democracy." Supporters including Mayor Hawkins argued that joining the pressure group adversely affected the Council's relations with local Māori while opponents like Councillor Lee Vandervis criticised the Council's reversal as a rejection of local democracy in favour of "centralised control."

In April, the mayors of the Gore District and the Southland District expressed support for the revised plans announced by government in response to the working group recommendations, including the shareholdings to be allocated to councils. The Mayor of Porirua expressed similar support. The President of Local Government New Zealand supported the need for change and the certainty provided by the government's announcements. However, the mayor of Auckland, although supporting much of the reforms, complained that Auckland was being disadvantaged and losing control of its water assets, because of the failure of other local bodies.

In early July, Waimakariri District Mayor and Communities 4 Local Democracy deputy chair Dan Gordon urged the Invercargill City Council to reconsider its decision not to join the lobby group. On 4 July, the Southland District Council confirmed that it would oppose the Government's Three Water reforms and seek to retain control over its water assets. On 6 July, the Wellington City Council voted against joining the anti-Three Waters Communities 4 Local Democracy. However, Mayor Andy Foster used his casting vote to express his disagreement with the Government's Three Water reforms.

Despite its stated opposition to the Three Waters reforms, the Taupō District Council applied for NZ$4.93 million in funding from the Government for an upgrade to Owen Delany Park. These funds come from the Government's Better Off Funding programme, which supports local government transition through the Three Waters reforms. Taupō District Mayor David Trewavas justified the funding application on the grounds that the Park upgrade would benefit the community.

Following the release of 2022 New Zealand local elections results in early October 2022, surveys by online media organisations Newsroom and The Spinoff found that a majority of elected mayors opposed the Three Waters reforms. Newsroom's survey of 220 newly-elected mayors and councillors found that 76% of respondents opposed the Three Water reforms. Similarly, The Spinoff's survey of 66 elected mayors found that 43 mayors were opposed to the Three Waters reforms, 14 were undecided, and that nine supported them.

During the 2022 Auckland mayoral election, mayoral candidate Wayne Brown campaigned on halting the Three Water reforms programme in Auckland. Following his election as Mayor of Auckland, Brown instructed the region's water management company Watercare Services to stop working on the programme on 17 October, describing it as a "doomed proposal". In addition, other newly-elected mayors including Mayor of Invercargill Nobby Clark and Mayor of Nelson Nick Smith have expressed opposition to Three Waters.

On 31 October 2022, Brown along with the Mayor of Christchurch Phil Mauger and the Mayor of Waimakariri Dan Gordon proposed an alternative Three Waters plan which would maintain the national water regulator Taumata Arowai but would maintain local ownership, control and accountability over water resources including stormwater assets, transport and drainage. Other proposed changes have included providing affordable finance to support high standard investments in water infrastructure and encouraging local water services entities to consolidate into regional water entities.

==== 2023 ====
Mayoral responses to the Government's Three Waters revamp in mid-April 2023 were mixed. Local Government New Zealand President Stuart Crosby stated that "a number of questions remained" but added that the vast majority of local councils agreed that water reform was necessary. Mayor of South Wairarapa Martin Connolly said that the changes would give local councils more say compared to the previous model. Mayor of Wellington Tory Whanau defended the need for water reform but wanted it to go faster. She also welcomed the retention of mana whenua representation on the water services entities. Mayor of New Plymouth Neil Holdom expressed support for the water reforms and urged the Labour and National parties to put aside their political differences. The mayors of the Hawke's Bay region including Mayor of Hastings Sandra Hazlehurst, Mayor of Wairoa Craig Little, Mayor of Central Hawke's Bay Alex Walker, Mayor of Napier Kirsten Wise, Hawke's Bay Regional Council chair Hinewai Ormsby, and Ngāti Kahungu iwi chair Bayden Barber issued a joint statement welcoming the changes to the Three Waters reform as a "win-win" for the Hawke's Bay region.

Several Mayors including Mayor of Ashburton Neal Brown, Mayor of Dunedin Jules Radich, and Mayor of Gore Ben Bell adopted "a wait and see approach."

By contrast, critics including Mayor of Manawatū and Communities 4 Local Democracy co-chair Helen Worboys, Mayor of Grey Tania Gibson, Mayor of Clutha Bryan Cadogan, Mayor of Hurunui Marie Black, Mayor of Upper Hutt Wayne Guppy, Mayor of Invercargill Nobby Clark, Mayor of Southland Rob Scott, Mayor of Central Otago Tim Cadogan, and Mayor of Queenstown-Lakes Glyn Lewers argued that the Government's changes failed to address their concerns with Three Waters including property rights, local governance, and regional representation.

==== 2024 ====
In early February 2024, the Central Otago District Council voted to renew its Three Waters' maintenance contract with Fulton Hogan despite the Government's plans to scrap the Three Waters programme.

=== Repeal responses ===
In response to the National-led coalition government's announcement that it would repeal the Labour Government's Three Waters reforms, Mayor of Far North Moko Tepania and Mayor of Buller Jamie Cleine expressed concerns that the repeal would cause council rates to rise. Mayor of Clutha Bryan Cadogan, who had initially supported Labours plans to merge all South Island water assets into one entity, stated that local councils would need to work together to manage their water assets despite the repeal. By contrast, Mayor of Auckland Wayne Brown, Mayor of Whanganui Andrew Tripe and Mayor of Manawatu and Communities 4 Local Democracy chair Helen Worboys, and Local Government New Zealand president Sam Broughton welcomed the return of water assets to local government controls' but urged the Government to work on introducing a replacement system that would address rising water prices.

=== Māori leaders and groups ===
In mid-May 2021, Te Maire Tau, the chair of Te Kura Taka Pini, the Māori tribe Ngāi Tahu's freshwater group, disputed claims by the opposition National Party leader Judith Collins that the Government was planning to transfer 50% of the publicly owned water assets in the South Island to Ngāi Tahu. He said Ngāi Tahu did not want to own water infrastructure, and believed that it should remain in public ownership, but that Ngāi Tahu was seeking a share of governance responsibilities.

In May 2021, some Māori leaders from Ruapehu District, Whanganui, South Taranaki and Rangitikei District, including Fiona Kahukura Chase and former Te Pāti Māori (Māori Party) Member of Parliament Dame Tariana Turia, said that the creation of large entities to manage water infrastructure would make it more difficult for local Māori to be part of policy making.

Following the launch of the Three Waters programme in late October 2021, Te Maire Tau, the co-chair of Te Kura Taka Pini, welcomed the Three Water reforms, claiming they would improve water services and environmental outcomes.

In mid April 2023, Te Pāti Māori vice-president John Tamihere rejected the idea of co-governance in favour of the idea that Māori owned the country's water resources.

=== Political parties ===
In mid May 2021, National Party leader Judith Collins claimed that the Government was planning to transfer 50% of the publicly-owned water assets in the South Island to the Māori tribe Ngāi Tahu.

In late October 2021, the opposition National and ACT parties vowed to repeal the Three Waters reforms if elected into government.

Christopher Luxon, who had replaced Collins as National Party leader, accused the Government of misleading local councils about Three Waters being optional. In response to criticism, Labour Party leader and Prime Minister Jacinda Ardern denied that the Government had misled local councils by pitching the Three Waters programme as optional but later determining that it was mandatory, claiming that the Government had worked with local councils to build a consensus for several months.

In response to the revised reform plans announced by government on 29 April 2022, opposition parties criticised the reforms because of the loss of control by local councils, and the design of the governance structure. They promised to repeal the proposed legislation if elected to government.

In late July 2022, Luxon stated that the Three Waters reforms could become an electoral issue at the 2023 New Zealand general election, claiming that the Government had not listened to local democracy, local government, and local voices when implementing the reforms.

On 25 February 2023, Luxon announced that a future National government would scrap the Three Waters reform programme and return water assets to local government control. In addition, Luxon confirmed that National would establish a Water Infrastructure Regulator within the Commerce Commission to set and enforce standards for long-term water infrastructure investment. Under National's water infrastructure plan, local councils would be required to "ring-fence" funds for water infrastructure and "Regional Council Controlled Organisations" would be established to help local councils borrow funds.

Following the launch of the Government's revamped "Affordable Water Reforms" programme in mid April 2023, Luxon claimed that the changes amounted to a name change and vowed to repeal the policy if National is elected into government. On 14 April, National's local government spokesperson Simon Watts disputed Local Government Minister Kieran McAnulty's debt figures around the Water Reforms programme and stated that the Government's rebrand of Three Waters would not fool anyone.

=== Public opinion ===
On 22 October 2021, a Curia-Taxpayers' Union poll found that 54% of voters opposed the scheme while 19% supported the scheme. Despite its unpopularity with local councils and the public, the Government persisted with the Three Waters reform programme.

On 22 November 2021, a Newshub–Reid Research poll found that 48% of people opposed the reforms while 27% supported, with 25% unsure. Of Labour voters, 40% were in support with 30% opposed and 31% unsure.

=== Protests ===
In mid-September 2021, about 25 protesters opposed to the Three Waters reforms stormed the offices of the Nelson City Council. The protest violated COVID-19 lockdown restrictions in force throughout New Zealand at the time.

In early October 2021, about 70 protesters opposed to the Three Waters reforms picketed the offices of the Tauranga City Council. The protest violated COVID-19 lockdown restrictions in force at the time.

On 21 May 2022, protesters opposed to the Three Waters reforms attempted to march across the Auckland Harbour Bridge. They assaulted police and disrupted traffic. In response, police arrested 11 protesters.
