= Earnscleugh =

- Rural community
- Interactive map of Earnscleugh
- Coordinates: 45.225°S 169.324°E
- Country: New Zealand
- Region: Otago
- Territorial authority: Central Otago District
- Ward: Vincent Ward
- Community: Vincent Community
- Electorates: Waitaki; Te Tai Tonga (Māori)

Government
  - Territorial authority: Central Otago District Council
  - Regional council: Otago Regional Council
  - Mayor of Central Otago: Tamah Alley
  - Southland MP: Joseph Mooney
  - Te Tai Tonga MP: Tākuta Ferris

Area
  - Total: 391.85 km^{2} (151.29 sq mi)

Population (June 2025)
  - Total: 840
  - Density: 2.1/km^{2} (5.6/sq mi)
- Time zone: UTC+12 (NZST)
  - Summer (DST): UTC+13 (NZDT)
- Local iwi: Ngāi Tahu

Earnscleugh is a small settlement and rural community, based alongside the Earnscleugh River in the Central Otago District, in the Otago region of New Zealand's South Island.

The area has vineyards and orchards.

== History ==
=== 19th century ===
The Earnscleugh Station farm was established in the area in 1862. Surveyor John Turnbull Thomson named it after Earnscleugh Water in south-east Scotland.

William Fraser ran the station between 1862 and 1893, first as farm manager and later as owner-operator. Rabbits were introduced to the farm in 1866 and infested the property. The property was abandoned to the Crown in 1985.

Dredging began in the area in 1863. The Earnscleugh Tailings Track has New Zealand's only complete record of dredging activity.

=== 20th century ===
Steven Spain farmed the Earnscleugh Station between 1902 and 1948, hiring rabbiters to try to bring the rabbit population under control. Further rabbit outbreaks were recorded, under various station owners, in 1948, the 1970s, and from 1981.

A Government-supported rabbit eradication programme, established in 1990, has kept the rabbit population under control since the late 1990s.

=== 21st century ===
Earnscleugh was affected by flooding in January 2021.

A tractor operator died in an incident later the same month.

== Demographics ==
Earnscleugh statistical area covers 391.85 km^{2} (151.29 sq mi) and had an estimated population of 840 as of June 2025, with a population density of 2.1 people per km^{2}.

Historical population
Year	Pop.	±% p.a.
2006	576	—
2013	609	+0.80%
2018	699	+2.79%

The statistical area had a population of 699 at the 2018 New Zealand census, an increase of 90 people (14.8%) since the 2013 census, and an increase of 123 people (21.4%) since the 2006 census. There were 252 households, comprising 378 males and 321 females, giving a sex ratio of 1.18 males per female. The median age was 47.1 years (compared with 37.4 years nationally), with 108 people (15.5%) aged under 15 years, 120 (17.2%) aged 15 to 29, 345 (49.4%) aged 30 to 64, and 129 (18.5%) aged 65 or older.

Ethnicities were 89.7% European/Pākehā, 5.6% Māori, 7.7% Pasifika, 2.1% Asian, and 1.7% other ethnicities. People may identify with more than one ethnicity.

The percentage of people born overseas was 19.7, compared with 27.1% nationally.

Although some people chose not to answer the census's question about religious affiliation, 53.2% had no religion, 39.5% were Christian, 0.4% were Buddhist and 0.9% had other religions.

Of those at least 15 years old, 141 (23.9%) people had a bachelor's or higher degree, and 93 (15.7%) people had no formal qualifications. The median income was $35,200, compared with $31,800 nationally. 117 people (19.8%) earned over $70,000 compared to 17.2% nationally. The employment status of those at least 15 was that 354 (59.9%) people were employed full-time, 120 (20.3%) were part-time, and 9 (1.5%) were unemployed.
