= Galloway, New Zealand =

Galloway
- Rural community
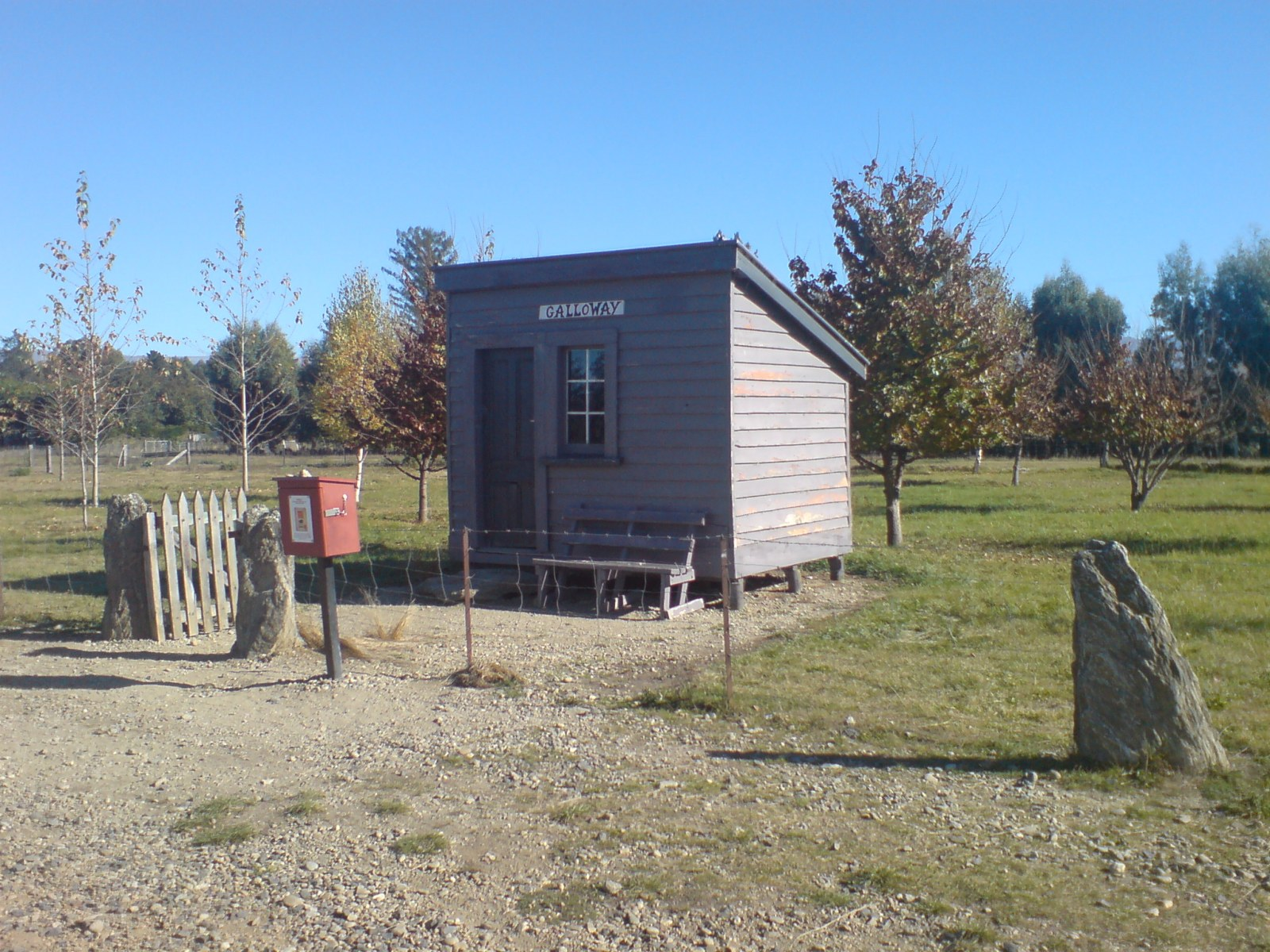
- Remaining part of the Galloway station
- Interactive map of Galloway
- Coordinates: 45.211°S 169.461°E
- Country: New Zealand
- Region: Otago
- Territorial authority: Central Otago District
- Ward: Vincent Ward
- Community: Vincent Community
- Electorates: Waitaki; Te Tai Tonga (Māori)

Government
  - Territorial authority: Central Otago District Council
  - Regional council: Otago Regional Council
  - Mayor of Central Otago: Tamah Alley
  - Southland MP: Joseph Mooney
  - Te Tai Tonga MP: Tākuta Ferris
- Time zone: UTC+12 (NZST)
  - Summer (DST): UTC+13 (NZDT)
- Local iwi: Ngāi Tahu

Galloway is a rural locality in the Central Otago District of Otago in New Zealand. It is about 6.5 km northeast of Alexandra, on the eastern bank of the Manuherikia River, opposite Springvale.

The Otago Central Rail Trail passes through Galloway.

== Demographics ==
Galloway is part of the Dunstan-Galloway statistical area, which covers 444.46 km^{2} (171.61 sq mi) and had an estimated population of 2,130 as of June 2025, with a population density of 4.8 people per km^{2}.

Historical population
Year	Pop.	±% p.a.
2006	1,233	—
2013	1,329	+1.08%
2018	1,695	+4.99%

Dunstan-Galloway had a population of 1,695 at the 2018 New Zealand census, an increase of 366 people (27.5%) since the 2013 census, and an increase of 462 people (37.5%) since the 2006 census. There were 612 households, comprising 867 males and 831 females, giving a sex ratio of 1.04 males per female. The median age was 49.0 years (compared with 37.4 years nationally), with 291 people (17.2%) aged under 15 years, 204 (12.0%) aged 15 to 29, 897 (52.9%) aged 30 to 64, and 303 (17.9%) aged 65 or older.

Ethnicities were 94.5% European/Pākehā, 5.5% Māori, 1.6% Pasifika, 0.7% Asian, and 2.7% other ethnicities. People may identify with more than one ethnicity.

The percentage of people born overseas was 14.7, compared with 27.1% nationally.

Although some people chose not to answer the census's question about religious affiliation, 57.0% had no religion, 35.2% were Christian, 0.2% had Māori religious beliefs, 0.5% were Buddhist and 0.9% had other religions.

Of those at least 15 years old, 276 (19.7%) people had a bachelor's or higher degree, and 243 (17.3%) people had no formal qualifications. The median income was $35,200, compared with $31,800 nationally. 285 people (20.3%) earned over $70,000 compared to 17.2% nationally. The employment status of those at least 15 was that 780 (55.6%) people were employed full-time, 288 (20.5%) were part-time, and 18 (1.3%) were unemployed.

== Education ==
A school flourished in Galloway in 1894 although it closed in 1896 due to concerns over scarlet fever.

A new school was built in 1912 and closed in 1941, with the building becoming a community hall.
