= Clyde, New Zealand =

Clyde
- Town
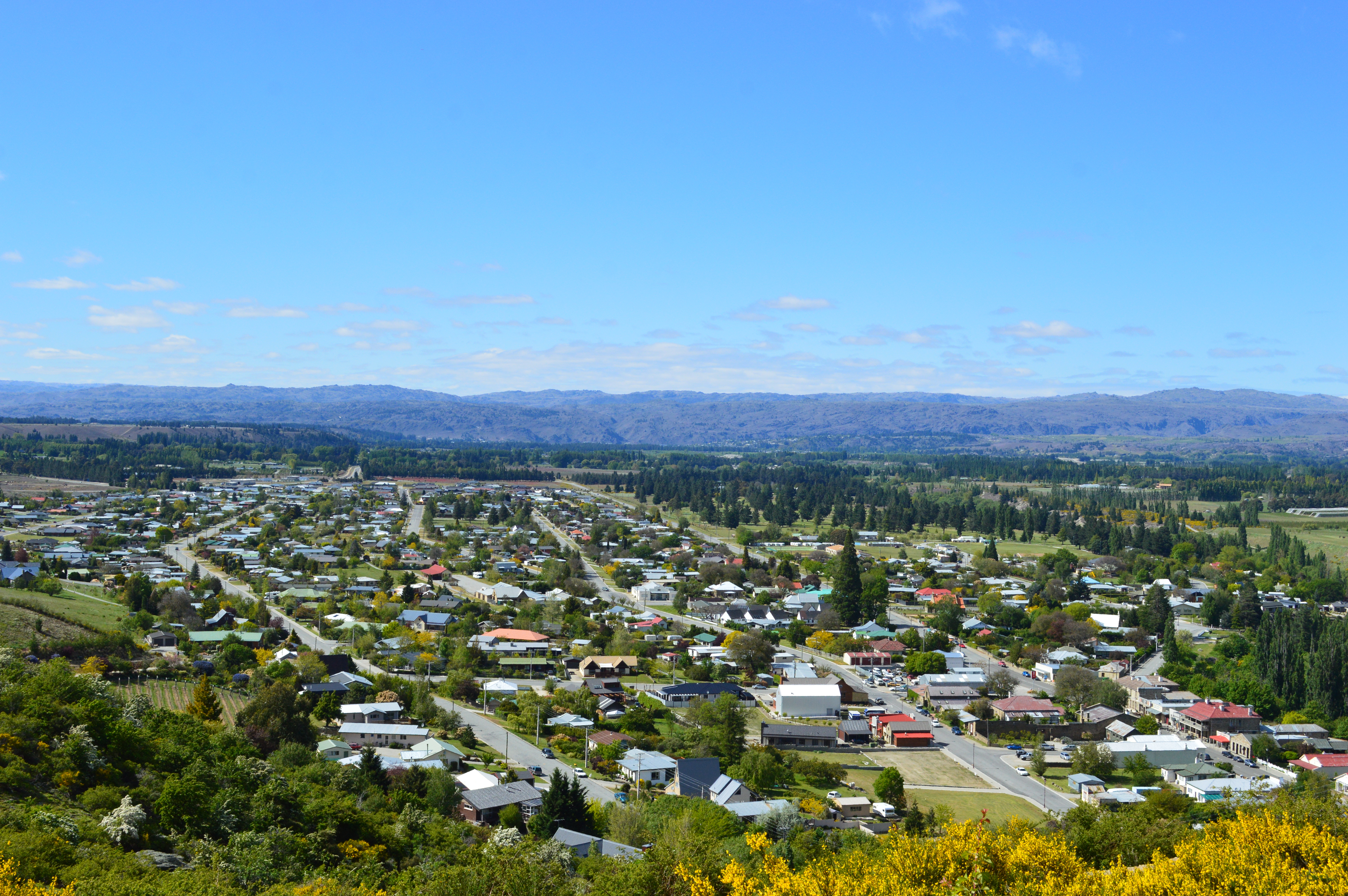
- Clyde, Central Otago, New Zealand
- Interactive map of Clyde
- Coordinates: 45°11′S 169°19′E
- Country: New Zealand
- Region: Otago
- Territorial authority: Central Otago District
- Ward: Vincent Ward
- Community: Vincent Community
- Electorates: Waitaki; Te Tai Tonga (Māori)

Government
  - Territorial authority: Central Otago District Council
  - Regional council: Otago Regional Council
  - Mayor of Central Otago: Tamah Alley
  - Southland MP: Joseph Mooney
  - Te Tai Tonga MP: Tākuta Ferris

Area
  - Urban area: 2.08 km^{2} (0.80 sq mi)

Population (June 2025)
  - Urban area: 1,200
  - Density: 580/km^{2} (1,500/sq mi)
- Time zone: UTC+12 (NZST)
  - Summer (DST): UTC+13 (NZDT)
- Local iwi: Ngāi Tahu

Clyde, formerly Dunstan, is a small town in Central Otago, New Zealand with a population of 1,200 in June 2025. It is located on the Clutha River, between Cromwell and Alexandra.

== History ==
The settlement was established during the Otago gold rush of the early 1860s with its post office building dating from 1863. Originally called Dunstan, the town could once claim to be the most populous in New Zealand during the height of gold fever. The town's post office (and thus the town) was officially renamed from Dunstan to Clyde on 22 May 1865, after Lord Clyde.

St Dunstan's Church was built in Clyde in 1903. Designed by the architect Francis William Petre in the early English Gothic revival style, it is now a heritage building.

== Geography ==
More recently the town has been known for the Clyde Dam, a giant hydroelectric dam at the north end of the town, behind which lies Lake Dunstan. The Clutha River is the swiftest river (per volume) in the southern hemisphere. The river then runs to the Roxburgh Dam before finally meeting the sea at Balclutha.

=== Climate ===
Climate data for Clyde (1991–2020 normals, extremes 1978–present)
Month	Jan	Feb	Mar	Apr	May	Jun	Jul	Aug	Sep	Oct	Nov	Dec	Year
Record high °C (°F)	37.6 (99.7)	36.0 (96.8)	33.1 (91.6)	28.7 (83.7)	25.3 (77.5)	19.7 (67.5)	19.0 (66.2)	22.0 (71.6)	25.9 (78.6)	28.6 (83.5)	32.5 (90.5)	34.2 (93.6)	37.6 (99.7)
Mean daily maximum °C (°F)	24.9 (76.8)	24.6 (76.3)	21.9 (71.4)	17.7 (63.9)	13.2 (55.8)	8.8 (47.8)	9.2 (48.6)	12.3 (54.1)	15.8 (60.4)	18.2 (64.8)	20.5 (68.9)	23.4 (74.1)	17.5 (63.6)
Daily mean °C (°F)	17.5 (63.5)	17.0 (62.6)	14.3 (57.7)	10.6 (51.1)	7.0 (44.6)	3.5 (38.3)	3.3 (37.9)	5.6 (42.1)	8.7 (47.7)	11.1 (52.0)	13.4 (56.1)	16.2 (61.2)	10.7 (51.2)
Mean daily minimum °C (°F)	10.0 (50.0)	9.4 (48.9)	6.8 (44.2)	3.5 (38.3)	0.8 (33.4)	−1.8 (28.8)	−2.6 (27.3)	−1.1 (30.0)	1.7 (35.1)	4.0 (39.2)	6.4 (43.5)	8.9 (48.0)	3.8 (38.9)
Record low °C (°F)	0.1 (32.2)	0.4 (32.7)	−2.1 (28.2)	−4.4 (24.1)	−8.3 (17.1)	−9.9 (14.2)	−9.8 (14.4)	−10.0 (14.0)	−7.0 (19.4)	−3.4 (25.9)	−1.7 (28.9)	0.4 (32.7)	−9.9 (14.2)
Average rainfall mm (inches)	47.4 (1.87)	41.6 (1.64)	30.9 (1.22)	32.3 (1.27)	34.7 (1.37)	33.4 (1.31)	22.9 (0.90)	24.4 (0.96)	25.7 (1.01)	34.7 (1.37)	39.5 (1.56)	42.8 (1.69)	410.3 (16.17)
Source: NIWA

== Economy and infrastructure ==
The town is a popular holiday spot. It lies at the western end of the Otago Central Rail Trail. The Otago Central Branch Railway originally terminated at Cromwell, but this section of the railway was closed in 1980, with the railway to Clyde used to bring materials for the dam project. The rail trail is nowadays often cycled and walked by visitors and locals alike.

The township is home to Dunstan Hospital, serving the surrounding district, including Alexandra and Cromwell. The hospital was rebuilt in 2006 with the original building remaining.

Clyde is fast becoming known as a tourist haven. The location is particularly attractive to those visiting the region's many vineyards and orchards. The regional weather is particularly warm and dry during the summer months due to the rain shadow effect caused by the Southern Alps (given New Zealand's westerly winds).

The Sydney Morning Herald described modern-day Clyde as having "movie-set good looks and ranked one of the best preserved gold-rush towns in New Zealand."

During the week beginning 22 September, the Clyde/Alexandra district hosts a Blossom Festival. This event celebrates the beginning of spring, which brings the blossoming of fruit trees in the area's orchards. Entertainment at the festival includes a parade with floats made by local businesses, fun park rides, and bands.

== Demographics ==
Clyde is described by Statistics New Zealand as a small urban area, and covers 2.08 km^{2} (0.80 sq mi). It had an estimated population of 1,200 as of June 2025, with a population density of 577 people per km^{2}.

Historical population
Year	Pop.	±% p.a.
2006	906	—
2013	999	+1.41%
2018	1,161	+3.05%

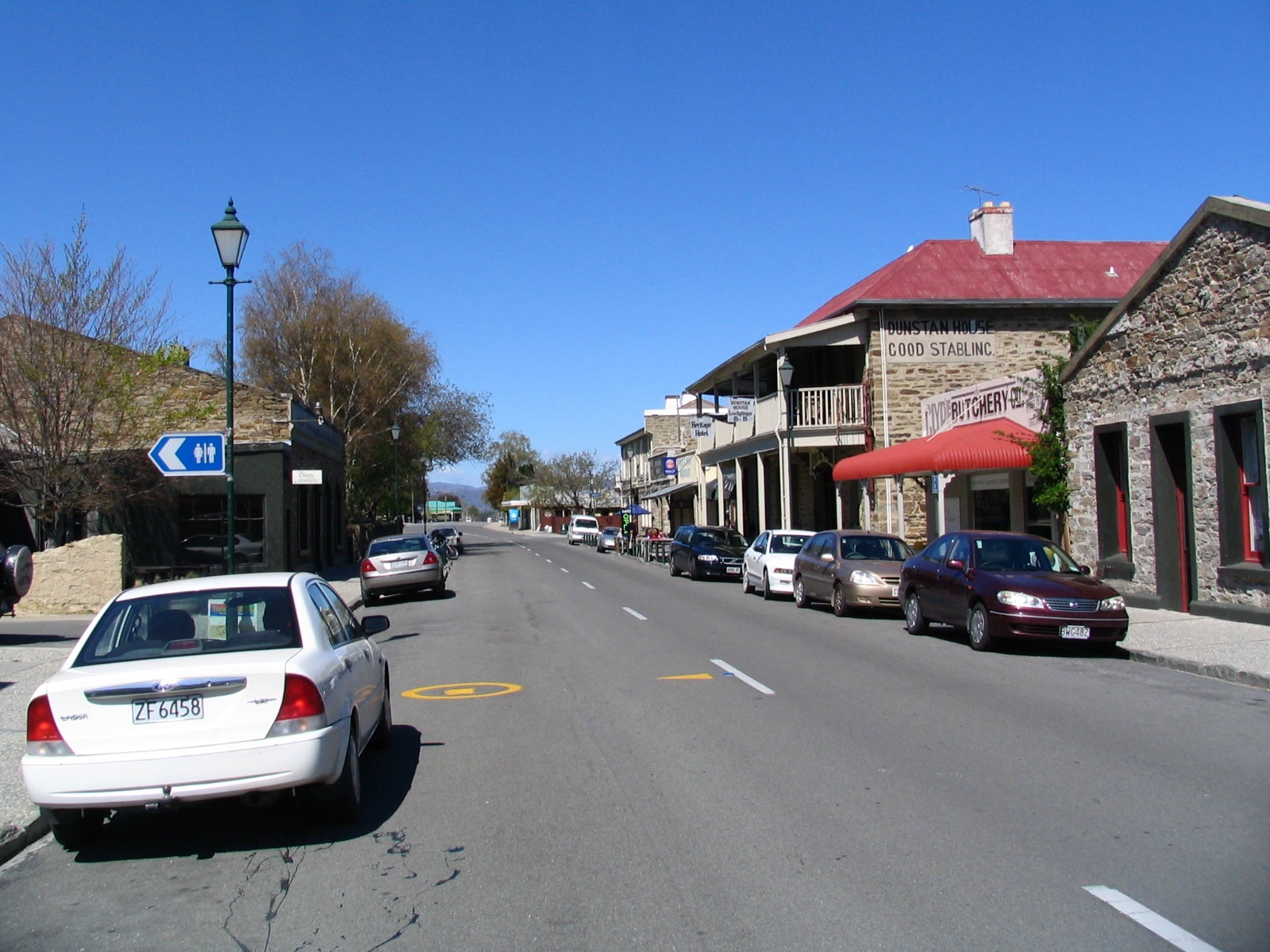
Sunderland Street

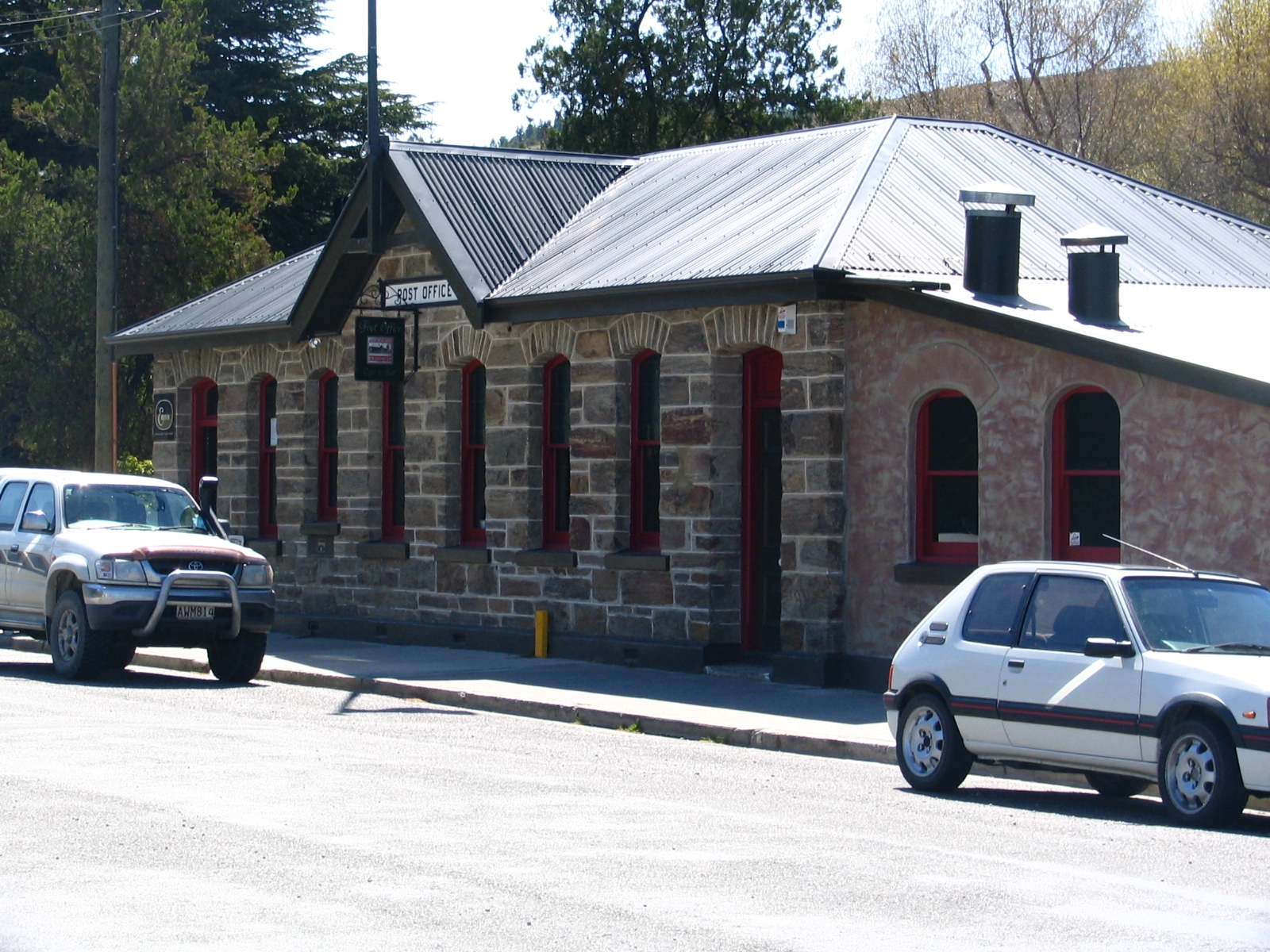
Former Clyde Post Office

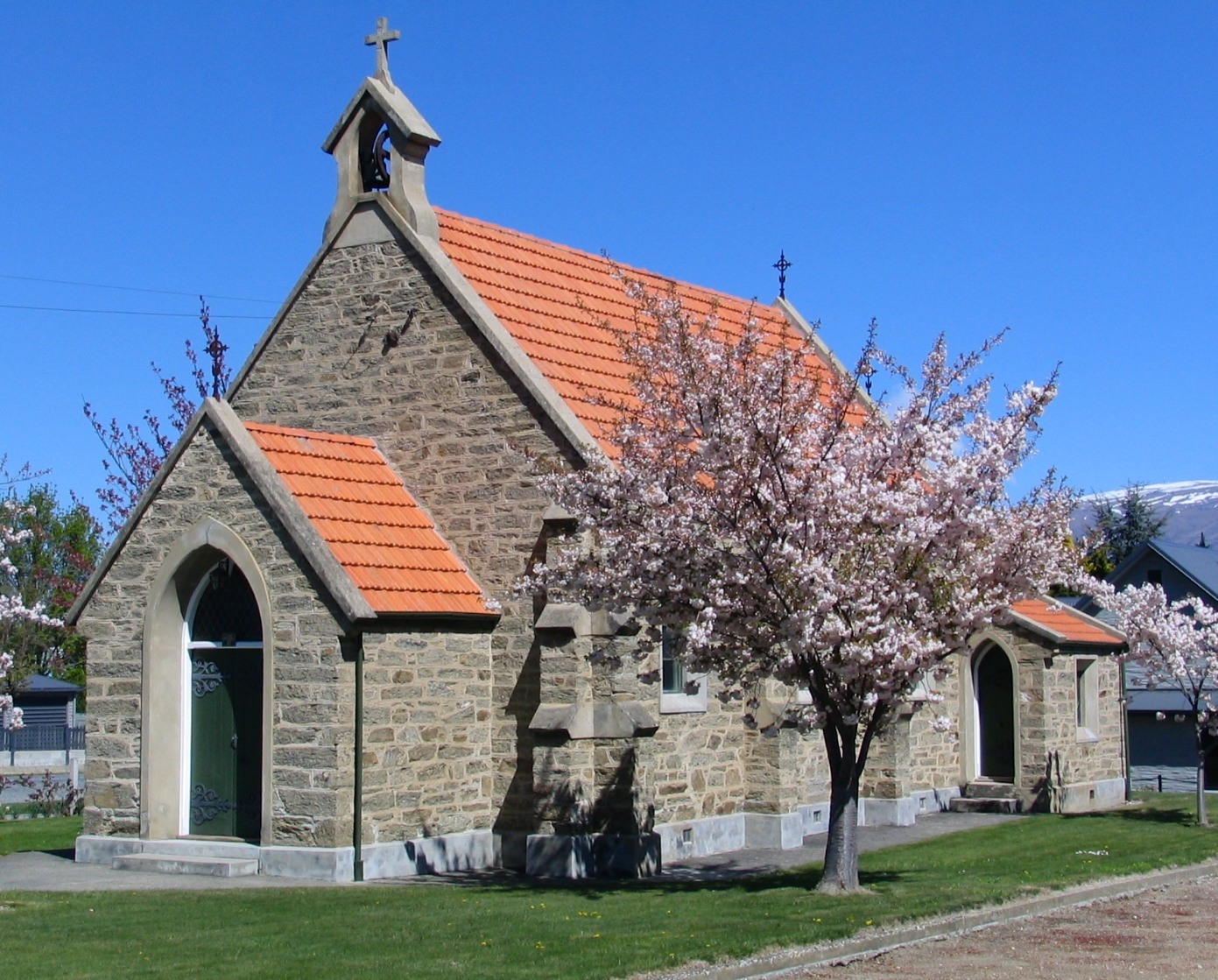
St Dunstan's Church (Catholic) Clyde, Otago

Clyde had a population of 1,161 at the 2018 New Zealand census, an increase of 162 people (16.2%) since the 2013 census, and an increase of 255 people (28.1%) since the 2006 census. There were 528 households, comprising 594 males and 564 females, giving a sex ratio of 1.05 males per female. The median age was 55.6 years (compared with 37.4 years nationally), with 165 people (14.2%) aged under 15 years, 99 (8.5%) aged 15 to 29, 558 (48.1%) aged 30 to 64, and 342 (29.5%) aged 65 or older.

Ethnicities were 93.8% European/Pākehā, 6.2% Māori, 1.8% Pasifika, 2.3% Asian, and 2.1% other ethnicities. People may identify with more than one ethnicity.

The percentage of people born overseas was 11.6, compared with 27.1% nationally.

Although some people chose not to answer the census's question about religious affiliation, 53.2% had no religion, 37.5% were Christian, 0.3% were Buddhist and 1.3% had other religions.

Of those at least 15 years old, 153 (15.4%) people had a bachelor's or higher degree, and 198 (19.9%) people had no formal qualifications. The median income was $31,000, compared with $31,800 nationally. 144 people (14.5%) earned over $70,000 compared to 17.2% nationally. The employment status of those at least 15 was that 477 (47.9%) people were employed full-time, 156 (15.7%) were part-time, and 21 (2.1%) were unemployed.

== Education ==
Clyde School is a co-educational state primary school for Year 1 to 8 students, with a roll of 173 as of July 2026. The school opened in 1863.

The nearest high school is Dunstan High School, which is situated 10 km away in Alexandra.

The nearest university is Otago University 200 km away in Dunedin.

== Notable people ==
- Steffan Browning, former Green Party MP
- Jason Hewett, All Black
- Benjamin Naylor, merchant
- Roy Scott, cricketer
- Emily Siedeberg, doctor
- Fleur Sullivan, restaurateur
