= Bryan Cadogan =

New Zealand local politician

His Worship Bryan Cadogan
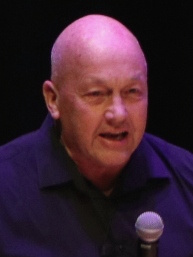
- Cadogan in 2024

3rd Mayor of Clutha
- In office 2010–2025
- Preceded by: Juno Hayes
- Succeeded by: Jock Martin

Personal details
- Born: Bryan Alexander Cadogan; 1959 or 1960 (age 65–66)
- Children: 2
- Relatives: Tim Cadogan (brother)
- Occupation: Shearer; retailer

Bryan Alexander Cadogan (born 1959 or 1960) is a New Zealand politician who served as the mayor of Clutha from 2010 to 2025. A retailer and former sheep shearer, he was first elected as a Clutha District Councillor in 1998. His younger brother, Tim Cadogan, was the mayor of Central Otago between 2016 and 2024.

== Early life and family ==
Cadogan was born in 1959 or 1960, and grew up in the South Otago town of Balclutha. He has been a retailer, sheep shearer and farm owner. He is married to Ally and the couple have two adult children. His younger brother, Tim, served as mayor of Central Otago from 2016 until his resignation in 2024.

In early February 2025, Cadogan attended Waitangi Day events at Waitangi for the first time in his life.

== Political career ==
In 1998, Cadogan was elected to the Clutha District Council as a councillor. At the time, he was one of the youngest councillors to be elected to that district council. In 2007, he ran for the Clutha mayoralty, but was defeated by the incumbent Juno Hayes by a margin of 958 votes. In 2010, Cadogan again contested the mayoralty, and unseated Hayes by a margin of 354 votes. Cadogan has remained mayor of Clutha for five terms, most recently being re-elected in 2022. As the mayor of Clutha, Cadogan has taken an interest in combatting youth unemployment in the Clutha District by launching the local programme Ready Steady Work.

In September 2016, Cadogan voiced opposition to ANZ Bank's proposal to close its branch in Milton, describing it as a "battle between a small community and a huge corporation". In October 2016, Cadogan contested the Mayoralty of Clutha unopposed and was re-elected for a third term.

In early 2018, Cadogan joined forces with several Otago mayors, including the mayor of Dunedin Dave Cull, Central Otago mayor Tim Cadogan, and mayor of Queenstown-Lakes Jim Boult, to promote Chinese tourism and flights to the Otago region by highlighting Chinese graves and settlements. In May 2019, Cadogan blamed several released North Island prisoners, who had served time at the Otago Corrections Facility in Milton, for a surge in local crime in the Clutha District.

In 2022, Cadogan served as chair of the lower South Island councils that lobbied against the Sixth Labour Government's proposed $100 million worth of cuts to the original design of the Dunedin Hospital redevelopment. Cadogan organised a gathering of politicians, clinicians and professionals involved in the hospital rebuild to initiate discussions on a campaign over the proposed cuts.

At the 2022 New Zealand local elections, Cadogan was elected for a fifth term as mayor of Clutha. In mid-May 2023, he voiced concern about the disparity in levies that residents of Waipori Falls Village were paying.

In late February 2024, Cadogan and the Clutha District Council declined to meet with members of the newly-formed Clutha Concerned Citizens ratepayers group to discuss proposed rate increases, claiming safety concerns. In response the rate payers group's leader Phil Barrett said that the meeting was an opportunity for the Council to hear local residents' concerns about rate increases and reiterated that the group would be planning further meetings.

In July 2024, Cadogan told the Otago Daily Times newspaper that he had experienced four cardiac events in the eight-month period between October 2023 and April 2024, related to his diabetes. He said that he was open to resigning if his health deteriorated. In mid-October 2024, it was reported that Cadogan would not contest re-election as mayor at the 2025 local elections.

In September 2024, Cadogan voiced opposition to Te Whatu Ora's (Health New Zealand) proposed cuts to the Dunedin Hospital rebuild. Cadogan cited his personal history of experiencing at least four cardiac events and said that the hospital not only served Dunedin but also the lower South Island. In early October 2024, Cadogan told Radio New Zealand that the Sixth National Government had told the Otago Mayoral Forum a month earlier that they would keep their election promise to build the hospital without cuts.

In early December 2024, Cadogan expressed interest in the Clutha District Council collaborating with the Gore District Council, Central Otago District Council and the Waitaki District Council in managing their water services amidst burgeoning costs.

In early July 2025, the water services authority Taumata Arowai released a report finding that the Clutha District had the highest number of water quality breaches in 2024; accounting for 338 (59.8%) of the 565 water safety breaches in 2024. Mayor Cadogan said the Clutha District Council accepted responsibility for the critical report and highlighted the Council's efforts to upgrade and maintain the district's water infrastructure.

== Views and positions ==
=== Boot camps ===
In August 2024, Cadogan opposed the Sixth National Government's efforts to reintroduce boot camps for youth offenders, citing the failure of borstal programmes during the 1960s and 1970s. Cadogan advocated youth work job schemes like the "Jobbortunities Expo" as an alternative to punitive boot camps.

=== Co-governance ===
In June 2023, Cadogan voiced opposition to anti-co-governance activist Julian Batchelor's Stop Co-Governance Tour, telling Batchelor that he was not welcome in Balclutha. In response, an online petition calling on Cadogan to apologise and accusing him of cancelling free speech was circulated. Cadogan refused to apologise and said that his actions aligned with his values and principles.

=== Term lengths ===
Cadogan has also supported extending term lengths for local government from three to four years, saying that it would allow local councils to do more long-term planning.
