= Tim Cadogan (politician) =

New Zealand lawyer and mayor

His Worship Tim Cadogan

4th Mayor of Central Otago
- In office 2016–2024
- Preceded by: Tony Lepper
- Succeeded by: Tamah Alley

Personal details
- Born: 1965; Balclutha
- Spouse: Linda Cadogan
- Children: are awesome
- Relatives: Bryan Cadogan (brother)
- Occupation: Broadcaster; Lawyer

Tim Cadogan (born 1965) is a New Zealand politician who served as the Mayor of Central Otago between 2016 and 2024. Cadogan worked as a radio broadcaster and lawyer before becoming Mayor. In late October 2024, Cadogan resigned as Mayor and moved to Wellington to work as the Local Government Engagement Specialist at the Taumata Arowai water services authority. He is the younger brother of Bryan Cadogan, the Mayor of Clutha.

== Early life and family ==
Tim Cadogan grew up in Balclutha, South Otago. He is the younger brother of Bryan Cadogan, the Mayor of Clutha. He later moved to Queenstown before settling in Clyde around 1996, where he lived for the next 28 years. Cadogan studied law at the University of Otago, graduating in 1991. After working for 12 years as a radio broadcaster, he started work as a family and criminal lawyer in 2005. In addition, Cadogan also worked as Disputes Tribunal Referee and owned a wine shop for one year.

Following a divorce, Cadogan had moved to Clyde as the single father of two children. Cadogan was a single father for eight years before marrying Linda Cadogan. The couple have a blended family consisting of four children.

== Political career ==
=== Vincent Community Board ===
Following the death of his friend and Vincent Community Board member John Shand, Cadogan contested Shand's vacant seat during the 2008 by-election and was elected to the Community Board. In 2013 Cadogan considered running for the Central Otago District Council (CODC) but decided to focus on running his law practice. Cadogan also served for a period on the Central Lakes Trust prior to his mayoral career.

=== First mayoral term, 2016–2019 ===
During the 2016 New Zealand local elections, Cadogan ran for the office of Mayor of Central Otago and unseated the incumbent Tony Lepper, winning 5,047 votes. During the election campaign, Cadogan capitalised on widespread unpopularity with Lepper's unpopular district-wide water rates and campaigned on improving communications between the Council and local community.

After assuming the Mayoralty, Cadogan introduced an affordable housing trust based on the Queenstown model in an attempt to address Central Otago's affordable housing shortage, which has been exacerbated by population growth, the increase in holiday homes, rising construction costs and interest rates. Between 2016 and 2024, the district's population rose from 18,000 to 26,700 people. Cadogan regarded the affordable housing shortage as his "biggest sense of failure" and expressed concern about its impact on young people in the region.

In early 2018, Cadogan collaborated with several Otago mayors including Mayor of Dunedin Dave Cull, Mayor of Clutha Bryan Cadogan and Mayor of Queenstown-Lakes Jim Boult to promote Chinese tourism and flights to the region by highlighting the Chinese graves and settlements dating back to the 19th century. Cadogan later credited that trip with piquing his interest in learning about Māori language and culture after seeing a bilingual screen while catching a flight from Christchurch to Guanzhou.

As Mayor of Central Otago, Cadogan promoted Māori language and culture within the CODC. He arranged for Māori language classes for staff members and also learnt enough of the language to perform mihi (speeches), pepeha (oral recitations) and whaikōrero during speeches. As Mayor, Cadogan also ensured that local council citizenship ceremonies incorporated the Māori language and culture.

=== Second mayoral term, 2019–2022 ===
During the 2019 New Zealand local elections, Cadogan was reelected as Mayor of Central Otago with a landslide majority of 7,094 votes; with his contender Victoria Bonham, only winning 839 votes.

In April 2020, Cadogan and several other Otago local government leaders including Mayor of Dunedin Aaron Hawkins, Clutha District Mayor Bryan Cadogan, Queenstown-Lakes Mayor Boult, Mayor of Waitaki Gary Kircher and Otago Regional Council chair Marian Hobbs agreed to donate ten percent of their salaries to charities in response to the COVID-19 pandemic in New Zealand. Cadogan donated his salary to the Central Otago Salvation Army Foodbank.

In May 2020, Cadogan issued a public apology for wearing blackface while dressed as African American jazz musician Louis Armstrong at a 2001 variety show hosted by New Zealand celebrities Taika Waititi and Jemaine Clement.

In April 2022, a Vincent Community Board deputy chairman wrote a letter of support for a newspaper column which had stated that the use of both English and Te Reo by a Radio New Zealand (RNZ) host was "educating no-one, patronising Maoridom and barking up a barren linguistic plum tree". In response, Cadogan emailed an RNZ journalist stating that the chairman's view was not that of the Central Otago District Council. After this email came to light on June 3rd, the chairman resigned and lodged a formal complaint with the council against Cadogan for misusing his official position, further stating in their complaint that they had "no issue with anyone wishing to learn the Maori language". An investigative report was ordered by the council from an independent lawyer who found that Cadogan had acted improperly and violated the council's code of conduct. Cadogan, following the recommendation of the report, issued apologies to the former chairman and the board stating that his actions were "improper" and that "I accept fully I should not have sent the email and I am disappointed with myself for having done so."

=== Third mayoral term, 2022–2024 ===
During the 2022 New Zealand local elections, Cadogan was reelected as Mayor of Central Otago again, this time unopposed.

In late May 2024, Cadogan was the sole member of the Central Otago District Council to support renaming the Maniototo Community Board to its correct Māori name Māniatoto. While the CODC acknowledged the error, the majority of councillors voted against the name change since it was not supported by the community board. According to board member and Councillor Stu Duncan, 90% of the community opposed the name change.

In June 2024, Cadogan attracted criticism from Central Otago ratepayers after suggesting ratepayers could consider reverse mortgages as a means of paying the proposed 18.3% rate increase; with some areas reporting a 30% rate increase due to hikes in water and waste water costs. He was also criticised for implementing a restructure of the district's rating system known as "districtisation." In September 2024, the CODC centralised ratings for parks, community facilities, pools and property, which had been previously rated at the ward level. Criticism of the centralisation of council rates range from suggestions that the CODC was attempting to take over Cromwell's endowment land and concerns about the loss of community input and representation.

On 30 September 2024, Cadogan announced that he would resign before the 2025 New Zealand local elections in order to take up a new job of local government engagement specialist at the national water regulator Taumata Arowai in Wellington. To avoid triggering a by-election, Cadogan said he resign as Mayor on 26 October during the Labour Weekend. District councillors will appoint his interim successor at a council meeting on October 30. On 30 October, Cadogan was succeeded as Mayor of Central Otago by second-term councillor and former policewoman Tamah Alley, who became the district's first female Mayor.
