= Minister of Local Government (New Zealand) =

New Zealand minister of the Crown

- Coat of Arms of New Zealand

- Flag of New Zealand

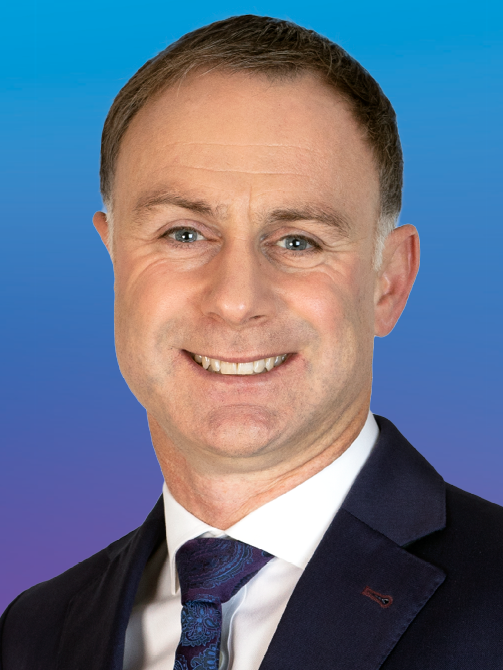
- Incumbent; Simon Watts since 24 January 2025
- Local Government Commission
- Style: The Honourable
- Member of: Cabinet of New Zealand; Executive Council
- Reports to: Prime Minister of New Zealand
- Appointer: Governor-General of New Zealand
- Term length: At His Majesty's pleasure
- Formation: 9 February 1972
- First holder: Allan Highet
- Salary: $288,900
- Website: www.beehive.govt.nz

The Minister of Local Government is a minister in the New Zealand Government with responsibility for supporting and overseeing New Zealand's local government system.

The current minister is Simon Watts.

== History ==
The portfolio was established in 1972, prior to which, local government had been within the purview of the Minister of Internal Affairs. Notwithstanding the separation of those responsibilities, the offices of Minister of Internal Affairs and Minister of Local Government were held by the same person for the first twelve years that a separate local government portfolio existed. The Minister of Local Government was supported by the Department of Internal Affairs until 1 July 2026, when administrative responsibility for the portfolio was transferred to the new Ministry for Cities, Environment, Regions and Transport.

== Responsibilities ==
The Minister of Local Government is responsible for New Zealand's system of local government and leads the government's relationship with councils. The Local Government Act 2002 confers powers on the minister to intervene at a council if it has a governance problem that the council is failing to address.

Because water services are a function of local government, the minister has been responsible for water policy (for example, the Water Services Reform Programme and Local Water Done Well) and is responsible for oversight of the Water Services Authority—Taumata Arowai, New Zealand's drinking water regulator.

The minister also has a role supporting the relationship between central government and local government, oversight of the Local Government Commission, and acts as the territorial authority for the 11 islands that are not part of a local authority's district and as the harbour authority for Lake Taupō.

== List of ministers ==
The following ministers have held the office of Minister of Local Government.

Key

Labour National Mauri Pacific Alliance ACT

No.	Name	Portrait	Term of office		Prime Minister
1	Allan Highet		9 February 1972	8 December 1972	Marshall
2	Henry May		25 November 1972	29 November 1975	Kirk
2	Henry May		25 November 1972	29 November 1975	Rowling
(1)	Allan Highet		29 November 1975	26 July 1984	Muldoon
3	Michael Bassett		26 July 1984	9 February 1990	Lange
3	Michael Bassett		26 July 1984	9 February 1990	Palmer
4	Philip Woollaston		9 February 1990	2 November 1990	Palmer
4	Philip Woollaston		9 February 1990	2 November 1990	Moore
5	Warren Cooper		2 November 1990	2 March 1994	Bolger
5	John Banks		2 March 1994	16 December 1996	Bolger
6	Christine Fletcher		16 December 1996	12 September 1997	Bolger
7	Maurice Williamson		12 September 1997	31 August 1998	Bolger
8	Tony Ryall		31 August 1998	9 August 1999	Bolger
8	Tony Ryall		31 August 1998	9 August 1999	Shipley
9	Jack Elder		9 August 1999	10 December 1999	Shipley
10	Sandra Lee		10 December 1999	15 August 2002	Clark
11	Chris Carter		15 August 2002	19 October 2005	Clark
12	Mark Burton		19 October 2005	5 November 2007	Clark
13	Nanaia Mahuta		5 November 2007	19 November 2008	Clark
14	Rodney Hide		19 November 2008	14 December 2011	Key
15	Nick Smith		14 December 2011	21 March 2012	Key
–	Gerry Brownlee (acting)		21 March 2012	2 April 2012	Key
16	David Carter		3 April 2012	31 January 2013	Key
17	Chris Tremain		31 January 2013	28 January 2014	Key
18	Paula Bennett		28 January 2014	14 December 2015	Key
19	Peseta Sam Lotu-Iiga		14 December 2015	20 December 2016	Key
20	Anne Tolley		20 December 2016	26 October 2017	English
(13)	Nanaia Mahuta		26 October 2017	1 February 2023	Ardern
(13)	Nanaia Mahuta		26 October 2017	1 February 2023	Hipkins
21	Kieran McAnulty		1 February 2023	27 November 2023	Hipkins
22	Simeon Brown		27 November 2023	24 January 2025	Luxon
23	Simon Watts		24 January 2025	present	Luxon

== See also ==
- Minister of Internal Affairs (New Zealand)
