= Central Otago District =

- Territorial authority district
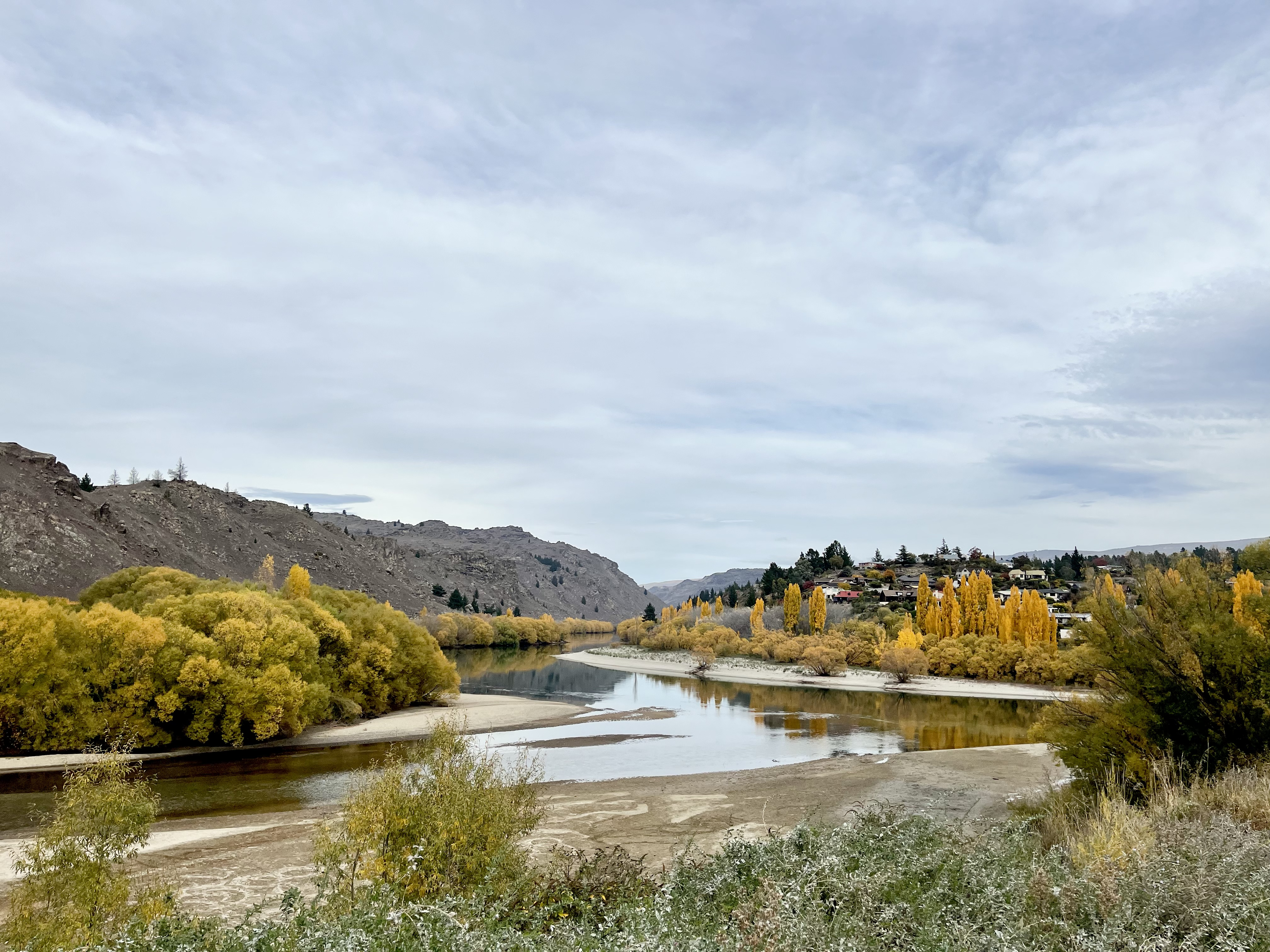

- Central Otago district in the South Island
- Coordinates: 45°14′S 169°22′E
- Country: New Zealand
- Region: Otago
- Wards: Vincent; Cromwell; Maniototo; Teviot Valley
- Seat: Alexandra

Government
  - Mayor: Tamah Alley
  - Deputy Mayor: Neil Gillespie
  - Territorial authority: Central Otago District Council

Area
  - Total: 9,968.38 km^{2} (3,848.81 sq mi)
  - Land: 9,933.27 km^{2} (3,835.26 sq mi)

Population (June 2025)
  - Total: 25,800
  - Density: 2.60/km^{2} (6.73/sq mi)
- Time zone: UTC+12 (NZST)
  - Summer (DST): UTC+13 (NZDT)
- Postcode(s): Map of postcodes
- Area code: 03
- Website: www.codc.govt.nz

Central Otago District is a local government district in New Zealand. It is administered by the Central Otago District Council, and it is in the Otago region, the top tier of local government in New Zealand. The major towns in the district are Alexandra (the seat of local government), Cromwell, Roxburgh, Clyde and Ranfurly. The district covers 9,968 km^{2} (3,849 sq mi), making it the fourth-largest district in New Zealand by area, and is home to 25,800 people as of June 2025.

The Central Otago District is part of what is informally known as Central Otago. It was formed in 1989 from the merger of the former Vincent and Maniototo Counties. The current mayor is Tamah Alley, who succeeded her predecessor Tim Cadogan in late October 2024. Cadogan had resigned in 2024 prior to the 2025 New Zealand local elections to move to Wellington.

== Demographics ==
Central Otago District covers 9,933.27 km^{2} (3,835.26 sq mi) and had an estimated population of 25,800 as of June 2025, with a population density of 2.6 people per km^{2}.

Historical population
Year	Pop.	±% p.a.
2006	16,644	—
2013	17,895	+1.04%
2018	21,558	+3.79%
2023	24,306	+2.43%

Central Otago District had a population of 24,306 in the 2023 New Zealand census, an increase of 2,748 people (12.7%) since the 2018 census, and an increase of 6,411 people (35.8%) since the 2013 census. There were 12,309 males, 11,937 females and 60 people of other genders in 10,212 dwellings. 2.0% of people identified as LGBTIQ+. The median age was 46.7 years (compared with 38.1 years nationally). There were 3,894 people (16.0%) aged under 15 years, 3,267 (13.4%) aged 15 to 29, 11,163 (45.9%) aged 30 to 64, and 5,982 (24.6%) aged 65 or older.

People could identify as more than one ethnicity. The results were 89.8% European (Pākehā); 9.5% Māori; 2.4% Pasifika; 4.5% Asian; 0.9% Middle Eastern, Latin American and African New Zealanders (MELAA); and 3.0% other, which includes people giving their ethnicity as "New Zealander". English was spoken by 97.8%, Māori language by 1.6%, Samoan by 0.1% and other languages by 7.4%. No language could be spoken by 1.8% (e.g. too young to talk). New Zealand Sign Language was known by 0.4%. The percentage of people born overseas was 17.6, compared with 28.8% nationally.

Religious affiliations were 32.0% Christian, 0.6% Hindu, 0.2% Islam, 0.2% Māori religious beliefs, 0.3% Buddhist, 0.4% New Age, and 1.0% other religions. People who answered that they had no religion were 58.4%, and 7.0% of people did not answer the census question.

Of those at least 15 years old, 2,946 (14.4%) people had a bachelor's or higher degree, 11,517 (56.4%) had a post-high school certificate or diploma, and 4,929 (24.1%) people exclusively held high school qualifications. The median income was $41,800, compared with $41,500 nationally. 1,941 people (9.5%) earned over $100,000 compared to 12.1% nationally. The employment status of those at least 15 was that 10,824 (53.0%) people were employed full-time, 3,084 (15.1%) were part-time, and 222 (1.1%) were unemployed.

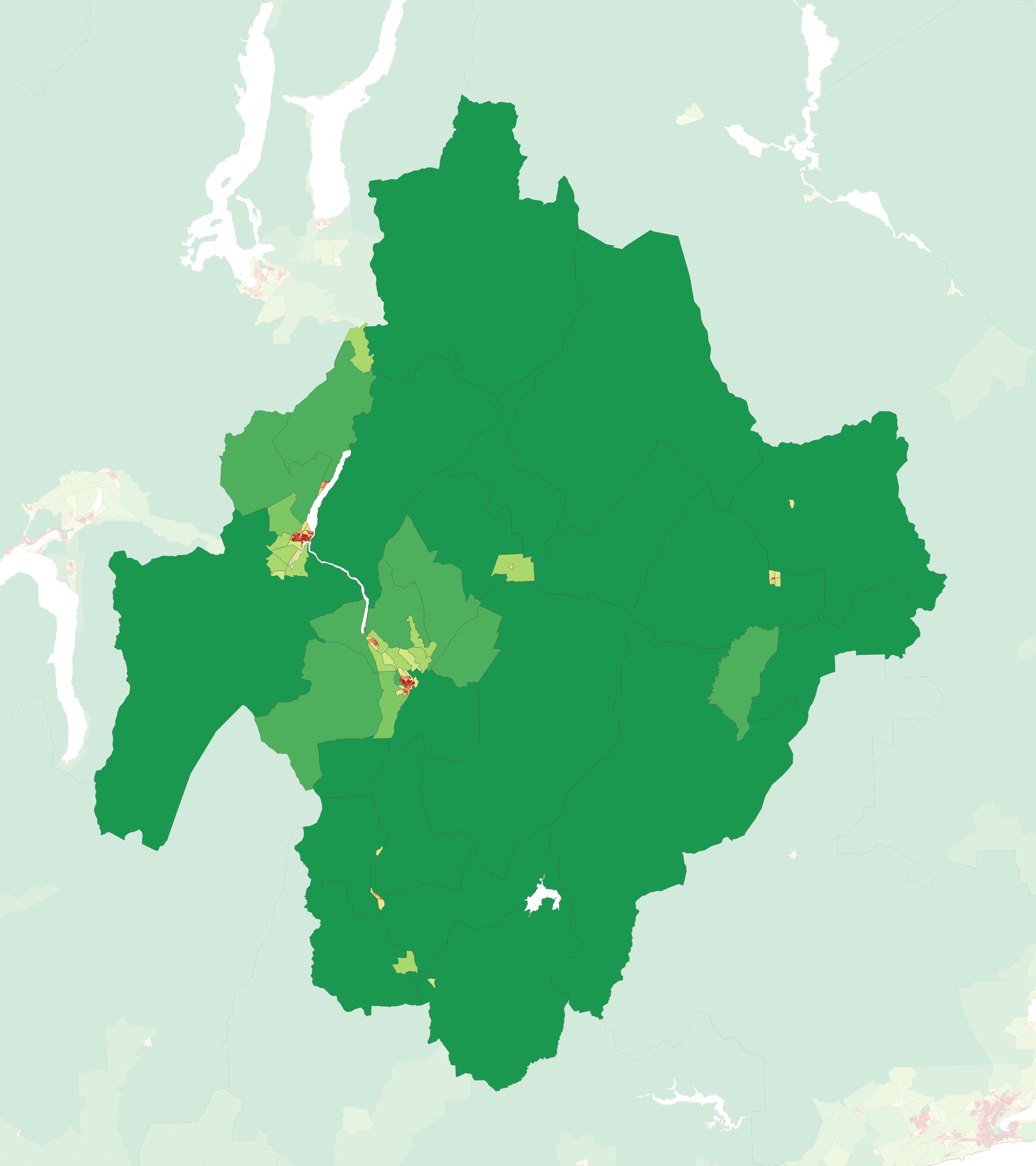
Population density in the 2023 census

Individual wards
Name	Area (km^{2})	Population	Density (per km^{2})	Dwellings	Median age	Median income
Cromwell Ward	2,900.23	10,014	3.45	3,960	42.1 years	$47,400
Vincent Ward	3,054.69	10,668	3.49	4,557	49.8 years	$40,000
Maniototo Ward	2,675.91	1,890	0.71	885	49.4 years	$34,700
Teviot Valley Ward	1,302.44	1,734	1.33	810	52.9 years	$33,300
New Zealand					38.1 years	$41,500

=== Urban areas ===
The Central Otago district has three towns with a population over 1,000: Cromwell (7,470), Alexandra (5,860), and Clyde (1,200). Together, they are home to 56.3% of the district's population.

== See also ==
- Territorial authorities of New Zealand
