= Territorial authorities of New Zealand =

Local government entities in New Zealand

Territorial authorities
- Map of current territorial authority areas
- Location: New Zealand
- Number: 67 (53 district councils, 12 city councils, and 2 other) (as of 2025)

The territorial authorities of New Zealand are the country's municipal local government entities, existing alongside the country's regional councils. There are 67 such authorities, including 12 city councils, 53 district councils and 2 sui generis councils (Auckland Council and Chatham Islands Council). Five territorial authorities (Note: Auckland Council, Gisborne District Council, Tasman District Council, Nelson City Council, and Marlborough District Council.) also have the powers of regional councils, and these are called unitary authorities.

Territorial authorities are not subservient to regional councils, and several of them have jurisdictions overlapping multiple regional council areas. Territorial authorities are responsible for the administration of local matters and resources. These include roads, building consents, water supply and sanitation, amongst other responsibilities. Non-unitary territorial authorities are not responsible for broader regional environmental management or public transport, as those are the responsibilities of the regional councils.

== History ==
In 1840 the Colonial Office was given the authority to divide New Zealand into counties, hundreds, towns, townships, and parishes. These divisions were to be of set sizes (similar to North American divisions, many of which are rectangular in shape) but this was rarely implemented.

=== 1989 local government reforms ===
For many decades until the local government reforms of 1989, a borough with more than 20,000 people could be proclaimed a city. The boundaries of councils tended to follow the edge of the built-up area, so little distinction was made between the urban area and the local government area.

New Zealand's local government structural arrangements were significantly reformed by the Local Government Commission in 1989 when approximately 700 councils and special purpose bodies were amalgamated to create 87 new local authorities. Regional councils were reduced in number from 20 to 13, territorial authorities (city/district councils) from 200 to 75, and special purpose bodies from over 400 to 7. The new district and city councils were generally much larger and most covered substantial areas of both urban and rural land. Many places that once had a city council were now being administered by a district council.

As a result, the term "city" began to take on two meanings.

City also came to be used in a less formal sense to describe major urban areas independent of local body boundaries. This informal usage is jealously guarded. Gisborne, for example, adamantly described itself as the first city in the world to see the new millennium. Gisborne is administered by a district council, but its status as a city is not generally disputed.

Under current law, an urban area has to be at least 50,000 residents before it can be officially proclaimed as a city.

=== Changes since 1989 ===
Since the 1989 reorganisations, there have been few major reorganisations or status changes in local government. Incomplete list:

- 1991: Invercargill re-proclaimed a city.
- 1992: Nelson-Marlborough Regional Council abolished by a Local Government Amendment Act. Of its territorial authorities, the Kaikōura District was transferred to the Canterbury Region, and Nelson City and Tasman and Marlborough districts became unitary authorities.
- 1995: The Chatham Islands County was dissolved and reconstituted by an Act of Parliament as the "Chatham Islands Territory", with powers similar to those of territorial authorities and some functions similar to those of a regional council.
- 2004: Tauranga became a city again on 1 March.
- 2006: The Banks Peninsula District merged into Christchurch as a result of a 2005 referendum.
- 2010: Auckland Council, a unitary authority, replaced seven local councils and the regional council.

Reports on completed reorganisation proposals since 1999 are available on the Local Government Commission's site (link below).

=== 2007–2009 Royal Commission on Auckland Governance ===
On 26 March 2009, the Royal Commission on Auckland Governance recommended the Rodney, North Shore, Waitakere, Auckland City, Manukau, Papakura and Franklin territorial councils and the Auckland Regional Council be abolished and the entire Auckland region to be amalgamated into one "supercity". The area would consist of one city council (with statutory provision for three Māori councillors), four urban local councils, and two rural local councils:

- Rodney local council would lose Orewa, Dairy Flat, and Whangaparaoa but retain the remainder of the current Rodney District. The split areas as well as the current North Shore City would form a Waitemata local council.
- Waitakere local council would consist of the current Waitakere City as well as the Avondale area.
- Tamaki Makaurau would consist of the current Auckland City and Otahuhu (excluding CBD)
- Manukau local council would consist of the urban parts of the current Manukau City and of the Papakura District.
- Hunua local council would consist of the entire Franklin District, much of which is currently in the Waikato Region, along with rural areas of the current Papakura District and Manukau City.
- The entire Papakura District would be dissolved between urban and rural councils.

The National-led Government responded within about a week. Its plan, which went to a Select Committee, accepted the proposal for supercity and many community boards, but rejected proposals for local councils and, initially, no separate seats for Māori.

Public reaction to the Royal Commission report was mixed, especially in regards to the Government's amended proposal. Auckland Mayor John Banks supported the amended merger plans.

Criticism of the amended proposal came largely from residents in Manukau, Waitakere and North Shore Cities. In addition, Māori Affairs Minister Pita Sharples spoke against the exclusion of the Māori seats, as recommended by the Royal Commission. Opposition Leader Phil Goff called for a referendum on the issue.

=== Creation of Auckland Council ===
Auckland Council was created on 1 November 2010—a unitary authority that is classed as both a region and a territorial authority. It incorporated the recommendations of the Royal Commission and was established via legislation. Auckland Council is uniquely divided into "local boards" representing the lowest tier of local government.

=== Failed proposed changes ===
- 2015: Proposals to amalgamate local councils in Wellington and Northland were accepted by the Local Government Commission for consideration, although following consultation they ultimately were not formed into a final proposal. The status quo remains.
- 2015: Amalgamation of four local councils and the regional council in Hawke's Bay was proposed by the Local Government Commission. A district wide referendum was held in Sep-2015, and the proposal was defeated by 66% of voters.
- 2015: The Local Government Commission received a proposal to review local government arrangements on the West Coast. In August 2016 the Commission decided to progress the application. The Commission then invited alternative applications to the original application. The Commission's call for alternative reorganisation applications or other proposals for change to West Coast local government arrangements closed on 15 March 2017. The Commission received 23 responses, 19 of which made specific proposals for change. In December 2017 the Local Government Commission determined its preferred option for local government reorganisation on the West Coast to be the transfer of district plan preparation from the Buller, Grey and Westland district councils to the West Coast Regional Council.
- 2017: The Local Government Commission received a proposal to amalgamate the Masterton, Carterton and South Wairarapa District Councils into a combined Wairarapa District Council. The proposal was defeated by referendum with 59% of voters rejecting the proposed merger.

=== Proposed amalgamation ===
By early May 2026, several district and regional councils in Northland, Taranaki, the West Coast, Waikato, the Bay of Plenty, Wellington Wairarapa, Hawke's Bay and Southland Regions were discussing options to merge into unitary authorities as part of the Sixth National Government's policy of "simplifying" local government. On 5 May, the Local Government Minister Simon Watts and the RMA Reform Minister Chris Bishop issued local councils with a three-month timeframe to come up with amalgamation plans under the new "Head Start" approach. These amalgamation plans replaced the earlier proposed "combined territorial boards" and would be assessed by the newly-established Ministry for Cities, Environment, Regions and Transport (MCERT).

The Government's 2026 amalgamation ultimatum received support from several local government leaders including Mayor of Nelson Nick Smith, Mayor of Southland Rob Scott, Mayor of Timaru Nigel Brown, Mayor of South Wairarapa Dame Fran Wilde, Mayor of Whangārei Ken Couper, Mayor of New Plymouth Max Brough, and Mayor of Invercargill Tom Campbell. By contrast, Mayor of Gore Ben Bell and Mayor of Rotorua Tania Tapsell expressed reservations about merger and the short time-frame. Meanwhile Mayor of Tasman Tim King preferred that the central government decide the local government model rather than delegating it to local councils. In addition, several Otago mayors including Mayor of Dunedin Sophie Barker, Mayor of Queenstown-Lakes John Glover, Mayor of Clutha Jock Martin, Mayor of Waitaki Mel Tavendale and Mayor of Central Otago Tamah Alley issued a joint statement that their councils were discussing merger options. Environment Southland chair Jeremy McPhail expressed disappointment that regional councils had been excluded from making proposals on the amalgamation process but said they would continue advocating.

On 24 September 2026, the Government announced that it would delay making decisions on amalgamating local councils until after the 2026 New Zealand general election. On 18 November, the Local Government Commission (LGC) proposed merging the Southland Region's three district councils (Gore District Council, Invercargill City Council, and the Southland District Council) with the regional council Environment Southland to create a new regional Southland Council. The LGC's proposal is separate from the Government's Head Start programme.

== List of territorial authorities ==
=== Current ===
There are currently 67 territorial authorities. Before the Auckland Council "super merge" in November 2010, there were 73 territorial authorities. Before the Banks Peninsula District Council merged with the Christchurch City Council in 2006, there were 74 territorial authorities.

| CoA | Territory | Authority | Seat | Area (km²) | Pop. (Note: Population as of June 2025) | Region (Note: Percentages, where shown, are of land area; otherwise 100%) |
|---|---|---|---|---|---|---|
| Link | Far North | District Council | Kaikohe | 6,684 | 73,700 | Northland |
| | Whangārei | District Council | Whangārei | 2,712 | 100,600 | Northland |
| None | Kaipara | District Council | Dargaville | 3,109 | 26,800 | Northland |
| None | Auckland | Council | Auckland | 4,941 | 1,816,000 | Auckland |
| None | Thames-Coromandel | District Council | Thames | 2,207 | 32,200 | Waikato |
| None | Hauraki | District Council | Paeroa | 1,270 | 22,100 | Waikato |
| None | Waikato | District Council | Ngāruawāhia | 4,404 | 91,100 | Waikato |
| None | Matamata-Piako | District Council | Te Aroha | 1,755 | 39,200 | Waikato |
| | Hamilton | City Council | Hamilton | 110 | 192,100 | Waikato |
| None | Waipā | District Council | Te Awamutu | 1,470 | 62,200 | Waikato |
| None | Ōtorohanga | District Council | Ōtorohanga | 1,999 | 10,700 | Waikato |
| None | South Waikato | District Council | Tokoroa | 1,819 | 26,000 | Waikato |
| None | Waitomo | District Council | Te Kūiti | 3,535 | 9,950 | Waikato (94.87%); Manawatū-Whanganui (5.13%) |
| None | Taupō | District Council | Taupō | 6,333 | 42,700 | Waikato (73.74%); Bay of Plenty (14.31%); Hawke's Bay (11.26%); Manawatū-Whanganui (0.69%) |
| None | Western Bay of Plenty | District Council | Greerton (Note: A suburb of Tauranga City) | 1,951 | 60,100 | Bay of Plenty |
| None | Tauranga | City Council | Tauranga | 135 | 161,000 | Bay of Plenty |
| | Rotorua | District Council | Rotorua | 2,409 | 78,000 | Bay of Plenty (61.52%); Waikato (38.48%) |
| None | Whakatāne | District Council | Whakatāne | 4,450 | 38,400 | Bay of Plenty |
| | Kawerau | District Council | Kawerau | 24 | 7,680 | Bay of Plenty |
| None | Ōpōtiki | District Council | Ōpōtiki | 3,090 | 10,300 | Bay of Plenty |
| | Gisborne | District Council | Gisborne | 8,385 | 52,700 | Gisborne |
| Link | Wairoa | District Council | Wairoa | 4,077 | 8,940 | Hawke's Bay |
| | Hastings | District Council | Hastings | 5,227 | 88,300 | Hawke's Bay |
| | Napier | City Council | Napier | 105 | 66,400 | Hawke's Bay |
| | Central Hawke's Bay | District Council | Waipawa | 3,333 | 15,950 | Hawke's Bay |
| None | New Plymouth | District Council | New Plymouth | 2,205 | 90,100 | Taranaki |
| None | Stratford | District Council | Stratford | 2,163 | 10,500 | Taranaki (68.13%); Manawatū-Whanganui (31.87%) |
| None | South Taranaki | District Council | Hāwera | 3,575 | 29,800 | Taranaki |
| None | Ruapehu | District Council | Taumarunui | 6,734 | 13,450 | Manawatū-Whanganui |
| | Whanganui | District Council | Whanganui | 2,373 | 49,200 | Manawatū-Whanganui |
| None | Rangitikei | District Council | Marton | 4,484 | 16,000 | Manawatū-Whanganui (86.37%); Hawke's Bay (13.63%) |
| Link | Manawatū | District Council | Feilding | 2,657 | 34,000 | Manawatū-Whanganui |
| | Palmerston North | City Council | Palmerston North | 395 | 90,500 | Manawatū-Whanganui |
| None | Tararua | District Council | Dannevirke | 4,365 | 18,950 | Manawatū-Whanganui (98.42%); Wellington (1.58%) |
| None | Horowhenua | District Council | Levin | 1,064 | 38,400 | Manawatū-Whanganui |
| None | Kāpiti Coast | District Council | Paraparaumu | 732 | 58,000 | Wellington |
| | Porirua | City Council | Porirua | 175 | 61,500 | Wellington |
| | Upper Hutt | City Council | Upper Hutt | 540 | 47,400 | Wellington |
| | Lower Hutt | City Council | Lower Hutt | 376 | 114,200 | Wellington |
| | Wellington | City Council | Wellington | 290 | 210,800 | Wellington |
| Link | Masterton | District Council | Masterton | 2,300 | 28,900 | Wellington |
| Link | Carterton | District Council | Carterton | 1,180 | 10,300 | Wellington |
| None | South Wairarapa | District Council | Martinborough | 2,387 | 12,200 | Wellington |
| None | Tasman | District Council | Richmond | 9,616 | 59,900 | Tasman |
| | Nelson | City Council | Nelson | 422 | 54,300 | Nelson |
| Link | Marlborough | District Council | Blenheim | 10,458 | 50,800 | Marlborough |
| None | Buller | District Council | Westport | 7,943 | 10,650 | West Coast |
| Link | Grey | District Council | Greymouth | 3,474 | 14,600 | West Coast |
| None | Westland | District Council | Hokitika | 11,828 | 9,430 | West Coast |
| None | Kaikōura | District Council | Kaikōura | 2,047 | 4,340 | Canterbury |
| None | Hurunui | District Council | Amberley | 8,641 | 14,350 | Canterbury |
| None | Waimakariri | District Council | Rangiora | 2,217 | 69,800 | Canterbury |
| | Christchurch | City Council | Christchurch | 1,416 | 419,200 | Canterbury |
| Link | Selwyn | District Council | Rolleston | 6,381 | 87,600 | Canterbury |
| | Ashburton | District Council | Ashburton | 6,182 | 37,400 | Canterbury |
| | Timaru | District Council | Timaru | 2,732 | 49,500 | Canterbury |
| Link | Mackenzie | District Council | Fairlie | 7,139 | 5,520 | Canterbury |
| None | Waimate | District Council | Waimate | 3,554 | 8,450 | Canterbury |
| None | Waitaki | District Council | Oamaru | 7,108 | 24,600 | Canterbury (59.61%); Otago (40.39%) |
| None | Central Otago | District Council | Alexandra | 9,933 | 25,800 | Otago |
| Link | Queenstown-Lakes | District Council | Queenstown | 8,720 | 53,800 | Otago |
| | Dunedin | City Council | Dunedin | 3,286 | 132,800 | Otago |
| None | Clutha | District Council | Balclutha | 6,335 | 18,800 | Otago |
| Link | Southland | District Council | Invercargill | 29,552 | 33,900 | Southland |
| None | Gore | District Council | Gore | 1,254 | 12,950 | Southland |
| | Invercargill | City Council | Invercargill | 390 | 58,000 | Southland |
| None | Chatham Islands | Council | Waitangi | 794 | 620 | Chatham Islands |

=== Former (post-1989 reforms) ===
| CoA | Territory | Authority | Existed | | Seat | Region | Successor |
| CoA | Territory | Authority | Created | Disbanded | Seat | Region | Successor |
|---|---|---|---|---|---|---|---|
| None | Banks Peninsula | District Council | 1 November 1989 | 6 March 2006 | | Canterbury | Merged into Christchurch City Council |
| | Auckland | City Council | 1 November 1989 | 1 November 2010 | | Auckland | Merged into Auckland Council |
| None | Rodney | District Council | 1 November 1989 | 1 November 2010 | | Auckland | Merged into Auckland Council |
| None | North Shore | City Council | 1 November 1989 | 1 November 2010 | | Auckland | Merged into Auckland Council |
| | Waitakere | City Council | 1 November 1989 | 1 November 2010 | | Auckland | Merged into Auckland Council |
| | Manukau | City Council | 1 November 1989 | 1 November 2010 | | Auckland | Merged into Auckland Council |
| None | Franklin | District Council | 1 November 1989 | 1 November 2010 | | Auckland | Merged into Auckland Council |
| Link | Papakura | District Council | 1 November 1989 | 1 November 2010 | | Auckland | Merged into Auckland Council |

== Governance ==
=== Mayors ===
The directly elected leaders of territorial authorities are called mayors. They chair local council meetings and have limited executive powers, including the ability to appoint a deputy mayor, establish committees, and select chairpersons for said committees. Their constitutional role, as laid out in the Local Government Act 2002, is to provide leadership to their councillors and citizens of their districts, and to guide the direction of council plans and policies.

=== Youth councils ===
Under the terms of the Local Government Act 2002, district councils have to represent the interests of their future communities and consider the views of people affected by their decisions. To fulfill that requirement and give young people a say in the decision-making process, many councils have a youth council. In late December 2023, the Ashburton District Council scrapped their youth council, stating they could engage better with younger people online and describing the current youth council as "a youth club where they ate pizza." In early January 2024, the Gore District Council opted to restructure its youth council and ruled out dismantling it. In April 2024, the Whanganui District Council proposed scrapping its youth council by June 2024 as part of budget saving measures.

== Elections ==
=== Current composition of elected members ===
| Council | Mayor (Note: Per relevant council website) | Deputy | Councillors | Composition (Note: Per 2025 New Zealand local elections unless indicated otherwise) | |
|---|---|---|---|---|---|
| Far North | Moko Tepania | Kahika Tepania | 10 | 9 | Independent |
| Far North | Moko Tepania | Kahika Tepania | 10 | 1 | Your Voice Our Community |
| Far North | Moko Tepania | Kahika Tepania | 10 | 1 | ACT Local |
| Whangārei | Ken Couper | Scott McKenzie | 13 | 13 | Independent |
| Whangārei | Ken Couper | Scott McKenzie | 13 | 1 | ACT Local |
| Kaipara | Jonathan Larsen | Gordon Lambeth | 8 | 8 | Independent |
| Auckland | Wayne Brown | Desley Simpson | 20 | 6 | Independent |
| Auckland | Wayne Brown | Desley Simpson | 20 | 5 | Labour |
| Auckland | Wayne Brown | Desley Simpson | 20 | 3 | Fix Auckland |
| Auckland | Wayne Brown | Desley Simpson | 20 | 2 | Manurewa-Papakura Action Team |
| Auckland | Wayne Brown | Desley Simpson | 20 | 1 | City Vision |
| Auckland | Wayne Brown | Desley Simpson | 20 | 1 | Putting People First |
| Auckland | Wayne Brown | Desley Simpson | 20 | 1 | Communities and Residents |
| Auckland | Wayne Brown | Desley Simpson | 20 | 1 | WestWards |
| Auckland | Wayne Brown | Desley Simpson | 20 | 1 | Team Franklin |
| Thames-Coromandel | Peter Revell | John Grant | 13 | 11 | Independent |
| Hauraki | Toby Adams | Paul Milner | 10 | 14 | Independent |
| Waikato | Aksel Bech | Eugene Patterson | 13 | 14 | Independent |
| Matamata-Piako | Ash Tanner | James Sainsbury | 12 | 13 | Independent |
| Hamilton | Tim Macindoe | Geoff Taylor | 14 | 10 | Independent |
| Hamilton | Tim Macindoe | Geoff Taylor | 14 | 4 | Better Hamilton |
| Waipā | Mike Pettit | Jo Davies-Colley | 11 | 11 | Independent |
| Waipā | Mike Pettit | Jo Davies-Colley | 11 | 2 | Better Waipa |
| Ōtorohanga | Rodney Dow | Katrina Christison | 9 | 10 | Independent |
| South Waikato | Gary Petley | Maria Te Kanawa | 10 | 11 | Independent |
| Waitomo | John Robertson | Eady Manawaiti | 6 | 7 | Independent |
| Taupō | John Funnell | Kevin Taylor | 12 | 12 | Independent |
| Taupō | John Funnell | Kevin Taylor | 12 | 1 | Let's Go Taupō |
| Western Bay of Plenty | James Denyer | Margaret Murray-Benge | 9 | 10 | Independent |
| Tauranga | Mahé Drysdale | Jen Scoular | 9 | 10 | Independent |
| Rotorua Lakes | Tania Tapsell | Sandra Kai Fong | 10 | 10 | Independent |
| Rotorua Lakes | Tania Tapsell | Sandra Kai Fong | 10 | 1 | Te Pāti Māori |
| Whakatāne | Nándor Tánczos | Julie Jukes | 10 | 11 | Independent |
| Kawerau | Faylene Tunui | Sela Kingi | 8 | 9 | Independent |
| Ōpōtiki | David Moore | Maude Maxwell | 7 | 8 | Independent |
| Gisborne | Rehette Stoltz | Aubrey Ria | 13 | 14 | Independent |
| Wairoa | Craig Little | Benita Cairns | 6 | 7 | Independent |
| Hastings | Wendy Schollum | Michael Fowler | 15 | 14 | Independent |
| Hastings | Wendy Schollum | Michael Fowler | 15 | 1 | Independent Green |
| Hastings | Wendy Schollum | Michael Fowler | 15 | 1 | CARE for Hastings |
| Napier | Richard McGrath | Sally Crown | 11 | 12 | Independent |
| Central Hawke's Bay | Will Foley | Jerry Greer | 9 | 10 | Independent |
| New Plymouth | Max Brough | Murray Chong | 14 | 14 | Independent |
| New Plymouth | Max Brough | Murray Chong | 14 | 1 | ACT Local |
| Stratford | Neil Volzke | Amanda Harris | 11 | 12 | Independent |
| South Taranaki | Phil Nixon | Rob Northcott | 13 | 14 | Independent |
| Ruapehu | Weston Kirton | Brenda Ralph | 9 | 10 | Independent |
| Whanganui | Andrew Tripe | Michael Law | 12 | 13 | Independent |
| Rangitikei | Andy Watson | Dave Wilson | 11 | 12 | Independent |
| Manawatū | Michael Ford | Grant Hadfield | 11 | 11 | Independent |
| Manawatū | Michael Ford | Grant Hadfield | 11 | 1 | ACT Local |
| Manawatū | Michael Ford | Grant Hadfield | 11 | 1 | Independent Green |
| Palmerston North | Grant Smith | Debi Marshall-Lobb | 15 | 13 | Independent |
| Palmerston North | Grant Smith | Debi Marshall-Lobb | 15 | 2 | Green |
| Palmerston North | Grant Smith | Debi Marshall-Lobb | 15 | 1 | Labour |
| Palmerston North | Grant Smith | Debi Marshall-Lobb | 15 | 1 | Te Pāti Māori |
| Tararua | Scott Gilmore | Sharon Wards | 9 | 10 | Independent |
| Horowhenua | Bernie Wanden | David Allan | 12 | 13 | Independent |
| Kāpiti Coast | Janet Holborow | Martin Halliday | 10 | 10 | Independent |
| Kāpiti Coast | Janet Holborow | Martin Halliday | 10 | 1 | Te Pāti Māori |
| Porirua | Anita Baker | Kylie Wihapi | 10 | 9 | Independent |
| Porirua | Anita Baker | Kylie Wihapi | 10 | 2 | Labour |
| Upper Hutt | Peri Zee | Corey White | 10 | 11 | Independent |
| Hutt | Ken Laban | Keri Brown | 12 | 11 | Independent |
| Hutt | Ken Laban | Keri Brown | 12 | 1 | Labour |
| Hutt | Ken Laban | Keri Brown | 12 | 1 | Independent Green |
| Wellington | Andrew Little | Ben McNulty | 15 | 6 | Labour |
| Wellington | Andrew Little | Ben McNulty | 15 | 5 | Independent |
| Wellington | Andrew Little | Ben McNulty | 15 | 4 | Green |
| Wellington | Andrew Little | Ben McNulty | 15 | 1 | Independent Together |
| Masterton | Bex Johnson | Craig Bowyer | 8 | 9 | Independent |
| Carterton | Steve Cretney | Grace Ayling | 8 | 9 | Independent |
| South Wairarapa | Fran Wilde | Rob Taylor | 10 | 11 | Independent |
| Tasman | Tim King | Brent Maru | 14 | 13 | Independent |
| Tasman | Tim King | Brent Maru | 14 | 2 | Sensible, Affordable and Ethical |
| Nelson | Nick Smith | Pete Rainey | 12 | 12 | Independent |
| Nelson | Nick Smith | Pete Rainey | 12 | 1 | Labour |
| Marlborough | Nadine Taylor | David Croad | 14 | 13 | Independent |
| Marlborough | Nadine Taylor | David Croad | 14 | 2 | ACT Local |
| Buller | Chris Russell | Shayne Barry | 10 | 11 | Independent |
| Grey | Tania Gibson | Allan Gibson | 8 | 9 | Independent |
| Westland | Helen Lash | Reilly Burden | 8 | 9 | Independent |
| Kaikōura | Craig Mackle | Vicki Gulleford | 7 | 8 | Independent |
| Hurunui | Marie Black | Fiona Harris | 10 | 11 | Independent |
| Waimakariri | Dan Gordon | Philip Redmond | 10 | 10 | Independent |
| Waimakariri | Dan Gordon | Philip Redmond | 10 | 1 | Standing Together |
| Christchurch | Phil Mauger | Victoria Henstock | 16 | 8 | Independent |
| Christchurch | Phil Mauger | Victoria Henstock | 16 | 4 | The People's Choice |
| Christchurch | Phil Mauger | Victoria Henstock | 16 | 2 | The People's Choice – Labour |
| Christchurch | Phil Mauger | Victoria Henstock | 16 | 2 | Independent Citizens |
| Christchurch | Phil Mauger | Victoria Henstock | 16 | 1 | Labour |
| Selwyn | Lydia Gliddon | Brendan Shefford | 10 | 11 | Independent |
| Ashburton | Liz McMillan | Richard Wilson | 9 | 10 | Independent |
| Timaru | Nigel Bowen | Scott Shannon | 9 | 10 | Independent |
| Mackenzie | Scott Aronsen | Scott McKenzie | 7 | 8 | Independent |
| Waimate | Craig Rowley | Sandy McAlwee | 8 | 9 | Independent |
| Waitaki | Melanie Tavendale | Rebecca Ryan | 10 | 11 | Independent |
| Central Otago | Tamah Alley | Tracy Paterson | 10 | 11 | Independent |
| Queenstown-Lakes | John Glover | Quentin Smith | 11 | 12 | Independent |
| Dunedin | Sophie Barker | Cherry Lucas | 14 | 11 | Independent |
| Dunedin | Sophie Barker | Cherry Lucas | 14 | 1 | Future Dunedin |
| Dunedin | Sophie Barker | Cherry Lucas | 14 | 1 | Building Kotahitaka |
| Dunedin | Sophie Barker | Cherry Lucas | 14 | 1 | Labour |
| Dunedin | Sophie Barker | Cherry Lucas | 14 | 1 | Green |
| Clutha | Jock Martin | Michele Kennedy | 9 | 10 | Independent |
| Southland | Rob Scott | Christine Menzies | 12 | 13 | Independent |
| Gore | Ben Bell | Joe Stringer | 11 | 12 | Independent |
| Invercargill | Tom Campbell | Grant Dermody | 12 | 13 | Independent |
| Chatham Islands | Greg Horler | Celine Gregory-Hunt | 8 | 9 | Independent |

== Community and local boards ==
Community and local boards
- Location: New Zealand
- Number: 111 community boards; 21 local boards; (as of 2025)

Any territorial authority can set up subdivisions of itself to represent specific communities, known as community or local boards. These were first established as part of the 1989 local government reforms, and are currently defined by the Local Government Act 2002.

Community boards are sub-district, unincorporated local government bodies that may be established for any contiguous area in a territorial authority district. They are intended to represent and advocate for specific communities within a council catchment area. As of 2025, there are around 110 community boards across New Zealand.

Local boards have greater powers than community boards. As of 2025, Auckland Council is the only territorial authority in New Zealand with local boards, which were established by the Local Government (Auckland Council) Act 2009.

Auckland Council has 21 local boards covering the entire city which provide governance at the local level and are responsible for libraries and other community facilities, local parks and events, and have the power to develop local by-laws or propose local targeted rates. Each local board has 5 to 9 elected members, with 149 local board members across all boards.
