= Water Services Authority—Taumata Arowai =

New Zealand water services regulatory agency

- Logo of Water Services Authority—Taumata Arowai

Agency overview
- Formed: 1 March 2021
- Jurisdiction: New Zealand
- Minister responsible: Hon Simon Watts, Minister of Local Government
- Agency executive: Allan Prangnell, Chief executive
- Website: www.taumataarowai.govt.nz

The Water Services Authority—Taumata Arowai is a Crown entity that serves as the national water regulator in New Zealand. It was established on 1 March 2021 following a water contamination outbreak in Havelock North in 2016.

== Mandate and functions ==
The Water Services Authority—Taumata Arowai is regulated by both the Water Services Authority—Taumata Arowai Act 2020 and the Water Services Act 2021. The Minister responsible for the authority is the Minister of Local Government; the authority's performance is monitored by the Department of Internal Affairs.

Its objectives include protecting drinking water safety and related public health outcomes, administrating the drinking water regulatory system and having oversight over the regulation, management and environmental performance of drinking water, wastewater, and stormwater networks. Its functions include providing national leadership, oversight, communication and coordination in relation to the regulation of drinking water, wastewater and stormwater networks.

The Crown entity is led by a leadership board and a Māori Advisory Group. The Water Services Authority—Taumata Arowai works with Māori whānau (families), hapū (sub-groups), iwi (tribes), other Crown entities, public health units, local government bodies, and drinking water supply companies, waste management companies on water infrastructure related issues.

== History ==
=== Formation ===
In July 2020, the Sixth Labour Government announced plans to establish a new water regulator. This new Crown entity assumed the water regulatory functions of the Ministry of Health. The Government also passed two laws, the Water Services Authority—Taumata Arowai Act 2020 and the Water Services Act 2021 to provide the regulatory framework for the new agency.

Originally the Water Services Authority was known primarily by its te reo Māori name, which refers to improving the authority's purpose of improving the performance of the water services sector over time. Taumata Arowai was established on 1 March 2021, and became fully operational on 15 November 2021. In addition to regulating the delivery and quality of drinking water, Taumata Arowai gained responsibility for overseeing the stormwater and wastewater systems of New Zealand in late 2023. The order of its names was reversed by the Sixth National Government on 27 August 2025.

=== Regulatory work ===
Following the Queenstown cryptosporidiosis outbreak in September 2023, Taumata Arowai advised 29 local district councils to install water treatment barriers by the end of 2025. By March 2025, 14 councils had taken steps to comply with Taumata Arowai's advisory while another 10 councils indicated they were unable to meet the late 2025 deadline, had deferred it, or opted for another compliance pathway.

In September 2024, Taumata Arowai's chief executive Allan Prangnell visited Greymouth to brief West Coast Region mayors about the Sixth National Government's plans to relax water services regulatory settings. Mayor of Buller Jamie Cleine and Mayor of Grey Tania Gibson welcomed these changes while Mayor of Westland Helen Lash expressed cautious optimism.

In late February 2025, Taumata Arowai intervened to assess Kaeo's water supply, which had been under a boil water notice since 2015 due to inadequate treatment and high Escherichia coli levels. Wai Care director Bryce Aldridge offered to resolve the matter with six water tanks and a UV light.

In May 2025, Taumata Arowai commissioned the Institute of Environmental Science and Research to investigate the presence of viruses in groundwater across the Canterbury Region. This investigation was done in cooperation with the Christchurch City Council and Environment Canterbury. That same month, the Central Otago District Council sought approval from Taumata Arowai for its safety plans for two council water supplies to avoid boil water notices.

In late June 2025, Taumata Arowai released a report which showed that 70 schools across New Zealand had water supplies that were contaminated by fecal matter. The water regulator urged the Ministry of Education to do more to improve its water quality.

In mid November 2025, the Water Services Authority took over the Northland town of Kāeo's drinking water supply from private contractor, Wai Care Environmental Consultants, and ordered the Far North District Council to operate it. The town had been under a boil water notice for the past ten years and lacked running water.

=== Leadership changes ===
In late August 2024, Local Government Minister Simeon Brown appointed former Watercare chief executive Raveen Jaduram as the new chair of the Water Services Authority's Board. He also appointed two new board members Amanda Singleton and Dr Frances Hughes for a three-year term. In addition, Brown renewed the terms of Māori Advisory Board members Riki Ellison and Bonita Bigham. He also appointed Ellison as the new chair of the Māori Advisory Board.
