= Tamah Alley =

New Zealand politician (born 1985)

Her Worship Tamah Alley

5th Mayor of Central Otago
- Incumbent
- Assumed office 2024
- Preceded by: Tim Cadogan

Personal details
- Born: 1985 (age 40–41) Oamaru
- Children: Three
- Occupation: Police officer; Councillor

Tamah Alley (/ˌteɪmə/ TAY-mə; born 1985) is a New Zealand local body politician who became the first female Mayor of Central Otago in late October 2024, succeeding the outgoing Tim Cadogan. She was previously a Police officer and Central Otago District councillor.

== Early life and career ==
Tamah Alley was born in Oamaru. She worked for 12 years as a Police constable in Auckland and Alexandra. In 2013, she moved to Alexandra in Central Otago.

== Local government career ==
By October 2024, Alley had served for two terms as a councillor for the Vincent Ward in the Central Otago District Council (CODC). Alley was re-elected as a CODC councillor during the 2022 New Zealand local elections. Following the election, Alley was appointed as the chairwoman of the Vincent Community Board. She was nominated by the outgoing chairman Martin McPherson.

She also served as chair of Local Government New Zealand's Zone 6, which covers all local government councils south of Waitaki. Prior to her appointment as Mayor of Central Otago, Alley was the only zone chair in New Zealand who was neither a mayor nor deputy mayor.

In late June 2024, the CODC voted to raise rates by 18.3%. During the meeting, Alley said that the rate increases had been brewing for several years and that it affected a wide cross-section of society including pensioners, families and students. She also expressed frustration with central government and the resource consent process.

== Mayor of Central Otago, 2024–present ==
Following the resignation of the incumbent Mayor Tim Cadogan in late October 2024, Alley was appointed as the next Mayor during a full council meeting in Alexandra on 30 October. Cadogan had resigned within a year of the 2025 New Zealand local elections to avoid triggering a by-election. Under the terms of the Local Government Act 2002, Central Otago councillors were able to elect a new Mayor from among their ranks. The sole nominee was Alley, who was nominated by Deputy Mayor Neil Gillespie. Following her appointment, Alley said that she and her fellow councillors would focus on "making democracy work" amid tough times for local governments, businesses, schools, jobs and families.

On 8 November 2024, Alley acknowledged local dissatisfaction with an 18.5% rates increase following the CODC's annual residential survey, which found that only 44% of residents were satisfied with councillors' performances. By comparison, the 2023 annual residential survey had recorded a 73% satisfaction rate. Alley attributed the steep rates increase to "decades of under investment" in the Central Otago District. In late November 2024, Alley and Mayor of Gore Ben Bell confirmed that their two councils would partner together to deliver water services to their communities, in response to rising costs and the Government's Local Water Done Well policy. Member of Parliament for Southland Joseph Mooney welcomed the partnership between the Central Otago and Gore District Councils. In early October 2025, the Department of Internal Affairs approved the creation of a joint Otago-Southland water services entity called Southern Waters, which is expected to launch in July 2027.

On 24 January 2025, Alley expressed support for a proposed joint regional economic deal between the CODC and the Queenstown-Lakes District Council to obtain central government funding to build a new gondola and regional hospital in Queenstown. The two councils, along with the Otago Regional Council, intend to make a joint bid for the infrastructural project by late February 2025. Alley described the proposed new regional hospital as "a win for health in our area."

On 14 April 2025, Alley confirmed that she would be standing as Mayor of Central Otago during the 2025 New Zealand local elections. On 11 October, was elected by a large majority with 5,990 votes (60.29%).

== Personal life ==
Alley is married with three children.
