= Mayor of Central Otago =

Administrative role

- Incumbent; Tamah Alley since 2024
- Style: His/Her Worship
- Term length: Three years, renewable
- Inaugural holder: Bill McIntosh
- Formation: 1989
- Deputy: Tracy Paterson
- Salary: $120,841
- Website: Official website

The mayor of Central Otago officiates over the Central Otago District of New Zealand which is administered by the Central Otago District Council. The first mayor of Central Otago was W.S. McIntosh who was elected in 1989, when following the local government reforms of that year, the Central Otago District Council was formed in the place of the previous county and borough councils of Central Otago.

The mayor of Central Otago serves a three-year term and acts as the chair of the council which comprises 11 other elected Councillors. The current mayor of Central Otago is Tamah Alley.

== List of officeholders ==
	Name	Term
1	Bill McIntosh	1989–2001
2	Malcolm MacPherson	2001–2010
3	Tony Lepper	2010–2016
4	Tim Cadogan	2016–2024
5	Tamah Alley	2024–present
