= Central Otago District Council =

Coordinates: 45.2568043°S 169.3874548°E

Type
- Type: Unicameral of Central Otago District
- Houses: Governing Body
- Term limits: None

History
- Founded: 6 March 1989

Leadership
- Mayor: Tamah Alley
- Deputy mayor: Tracy Paterson

Structure
- Seats: 11 seats (1 mayor, 10 ward seats)
- Length of term: 3 years

Website
- codc.govt.nz

Central Otago District Council is the territorial authority for the Central Otago District of New Zealand.

The council is led by the mayor of Central Otago, who is currently Tamah Alley. There are also 10 ward councillors.

== Composition ==
=== Councillors ===
Central Otago District Council, 2025–2028
Position	Name	Ward	Affiliation
Mayor	Tamah Alley	At-large	Independent
Deputy mayor	Tracy Paterson	Vincent	Independent
Councillor	Sarah Browne	Cromwell	Independent
Councillor	Andrew Dowling	Vincent	Independent
Councillor	Stu Duncan	Maniototo	Independent
Councillor	Cheryl Laws	Cromwell	Independent
Councillor	Nathan McLean	Vincent	Independent
Councillor	Martin McPherson	Vincent	Independent
Councillor	Curtis Pannett	Teviot Valley	Independent
Councillor	Charlie Sanders	Cromwell	Independent
Councillor	Bob Scott	Cromwell	Independent

Councillor-elect Dave McKenzie, who had been elected to the council for the Vincent ward in the 2025 elections, resigned shortly after the election following accusations of financial misconduct. McKenzie's resignation triggered a by-election held from 30 January to 3 March 2026, with the seat being won by veterinarian Andrew Dowling.

=== Community boards ===
- Cromwell Community Board
- Maniototo Community Board
- Teviot Valley Community Board
- Vincent Community Board

== History ==
The council was established in 1989, through the merger of Cromwell Borough Council (established in 1866), Alexandra Borough Council (established in 1867), Naseby Borough Council (established in 1872), Maniototo County Council (established in 1876), and Vincent County Council (established in 1876).

In 2020, the council had 154 staff, including 17 earning more than $100,000. According to the Taxpayers' Union lobby group, residential rates averaged $2,156.

== Elections ==
=== List ===
- 1989
- 1992
- 1995
- 1998
- 2001
- 2004
- 2007
- 2010
- 2013
- 2016
- 2019
- 2022
- 2025
- (2026)

=== 2026 by-election ===
2026 Central Otago District Council by-election – Vincent ward
Affiliation	Candidate	Vote	%	+/−
Independent	Andrew Dowling	1,226	40.42	(new)
Independent	Louise van der Voort	903	29.77	
Independent	Nat Jamieson	893	29.44	(new)
Informal		6	0.20	
Blank		5	0.16	
Turnout		3,033	(36.44)	
Registered		~8,323		
Independent gain from Independent				
