= Dunstan Mountains =

Mountains in South Island, New Zealand

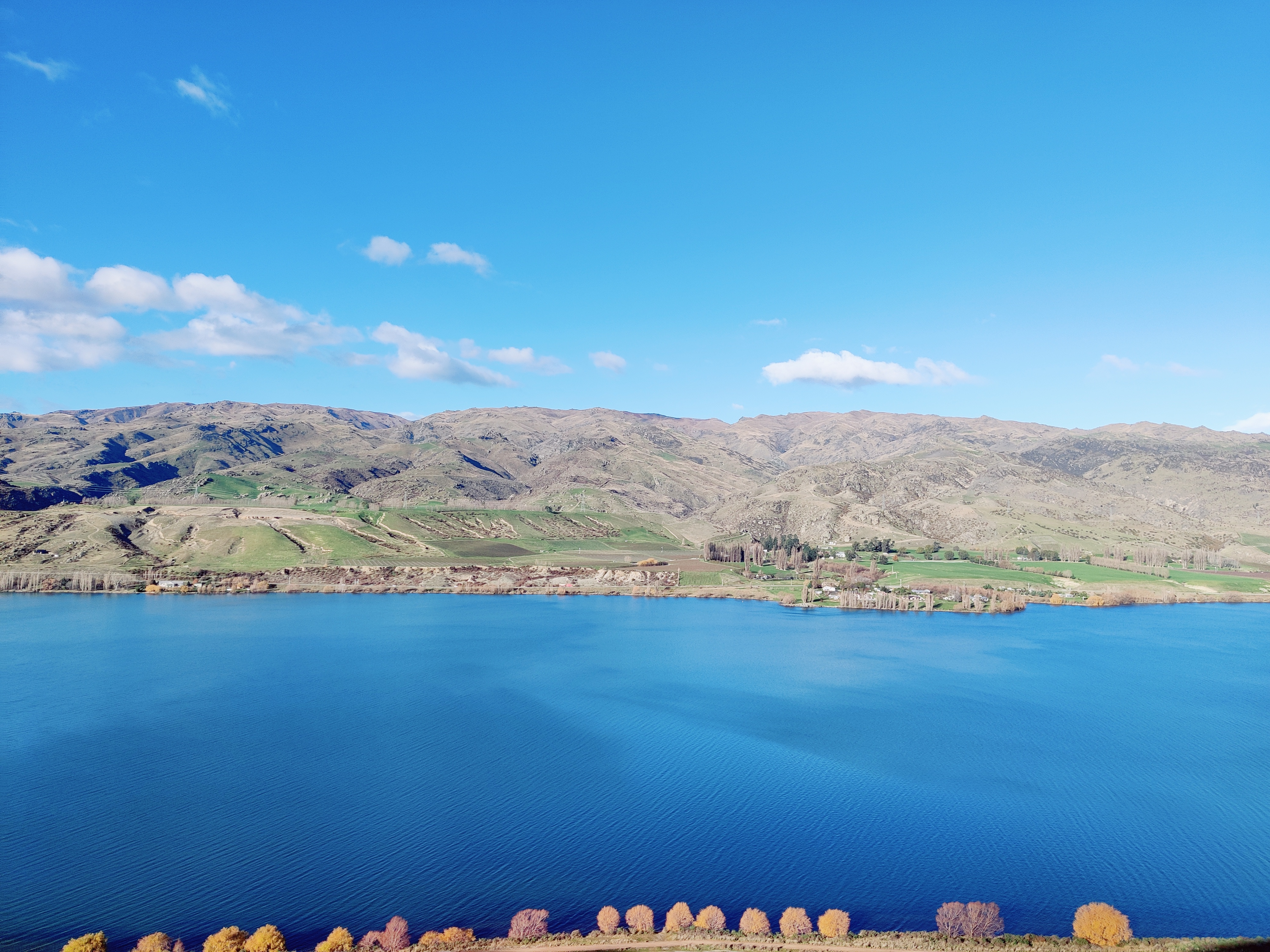
- The Dunstan Mountains as viewed from the Lowburn Sugarloaf

Highest point
- Peak: Dunstan
- Elevation: 1,667 m (5,469 ft)
- Coordinates: 45.049°S 169.376°E

Dimensions
- Length: 51 km (32 mi) 45°
- Width: 19 km (12 mi) 135°
- Area: 826 km^{2} (319 mi^{2})

Naming
- Native name: Mataki-nui, Neinei-i-kura, Tiko-umu (Māori)
- English translation: Matakanui translates as big burn on the face

Geography
- Location within New Zealand
- Location: Otago, South Island, New Zealand
- Country: New Zealand
- Region: Otago
- Range coordinates: 44.871°S 169.590°E
- Parent range: Dunstan Mountains
- Topo map: NZMS260 F41 Edition 1 1991 Limited Revision 1996

Geology
- Orogeny: Kaikoura Orogeny
- Rock age: 200 Ma
- Mountain type: Fault-block mountain
- Rock type: Schist

The Dunstan Mountains are a mountain range in Central Otago, in the South Island of New Zealand. The mountains lie on the eastern shore of the man-made Lake Dunstan and overlook the towns of Cromwell to the west, Clyde to the south and Omakau to the east. The highest named peak on the mountain range, a rocky knoll simply called Dunstan, is 1,667 m (5,469 feet).

Together with the Cairnmuir Mountains to the south, the Dunstan Mountains form the Cromwell Gorge which was dammed to form New Zealand's third-largest hydroelectric dam, (Note: List of power stations in New Zealand) the Clyde Dam.

The Dunstan Mountains should not be confused with the Dunstan Range, a small mountain range which lies approximately 20 km (12 mi) north of the Dunstan Mountains near the Lindis Pass.

== Geography ==
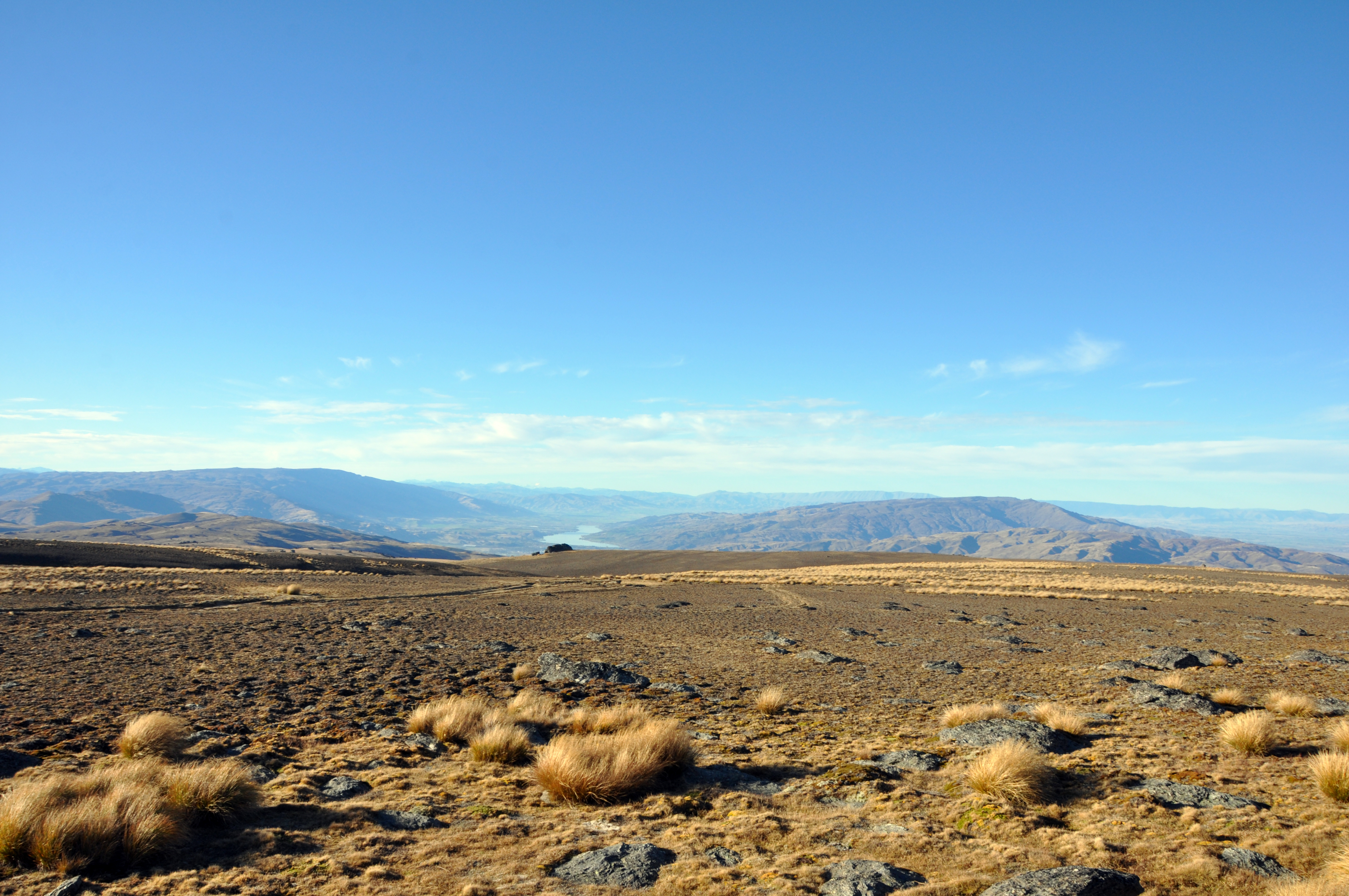
View of the Dunstan Mountains (at right) from the Old Woman Range illustrating the asymmetric form of the mountain range: a gentle dip to the left (west) and a steep dip to the right

The Dunstan Mountains form the entrance to the Upper Clutha Valley. The northwest flank of the range is bound by a combination of Cluden Stream in the Lindis Valley, the Lindis River, the Clutha River (Māori: Mata-Au) and Lake Dunstan. Lake Dunstan follows the former Clutha River through the Cromwell Gorge demarcating the southwest limit of the mountains. The mountain range is bound to the east by the Manuherikia Valley and to the northeast by Dunstan Creek, which joins the Manuherikia River at Saint Bathans.

The Dunstan Mountains are bisected by the 4-wheel drive Thomson Gorge Road which follows Thomsons Creek, incised into the eastern flank of the range and the Rise and Shine Creek on the western flank. Thomsons Saddle, between the two creeks, climbs to 980 m (3,220 ft) elevation.

The summit landscape is generally a broad, gently sloping undulatory surface which climbs steadily from the west and falls sharply to the Manuherakia Valley floor on the east. The asymmetric nature of the Dunstan Mountains is common with most of Central Otago's basin and range mountains.

== Geology ==
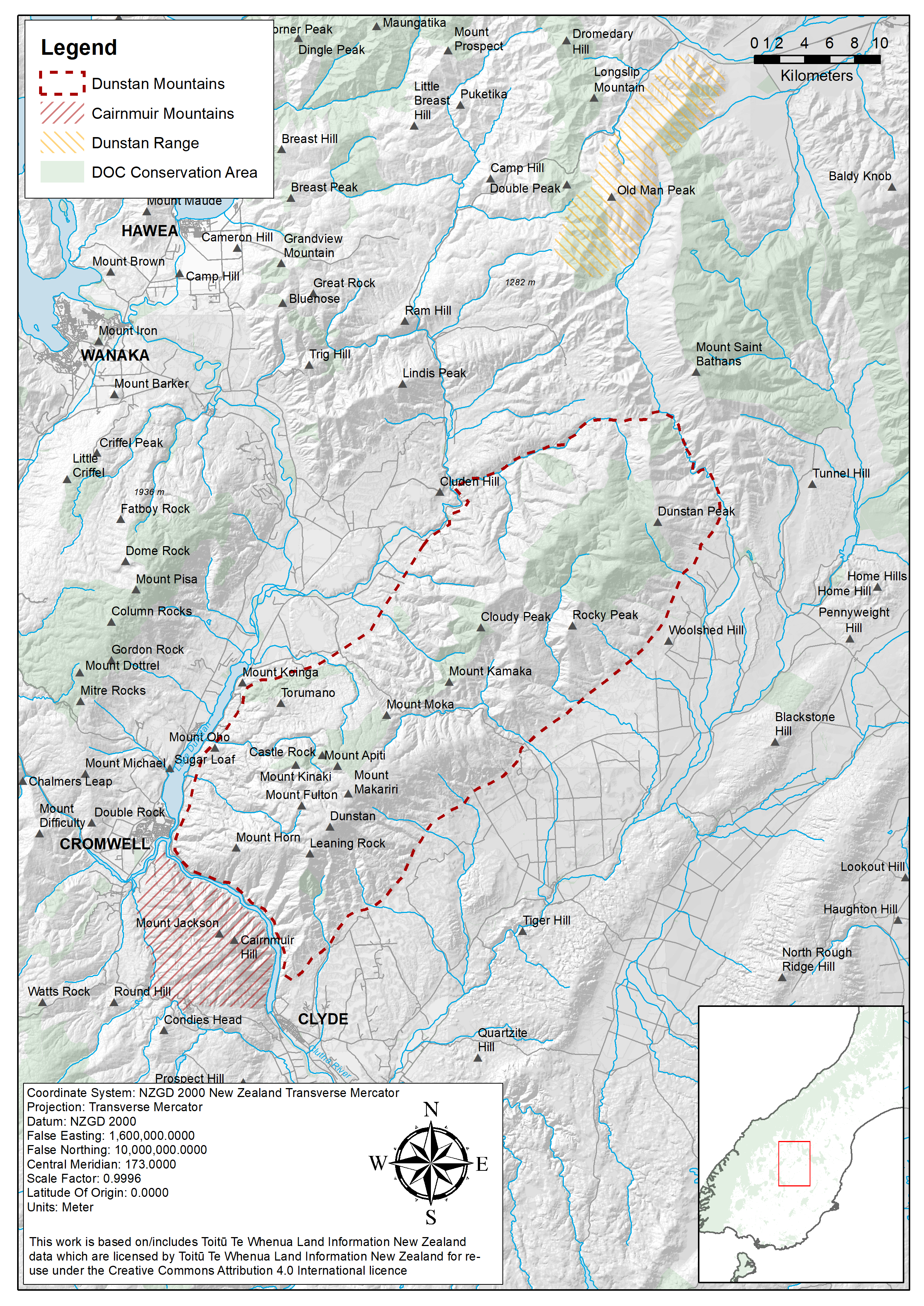
Map of the Dunstan Mountains in Central Otago, South Island

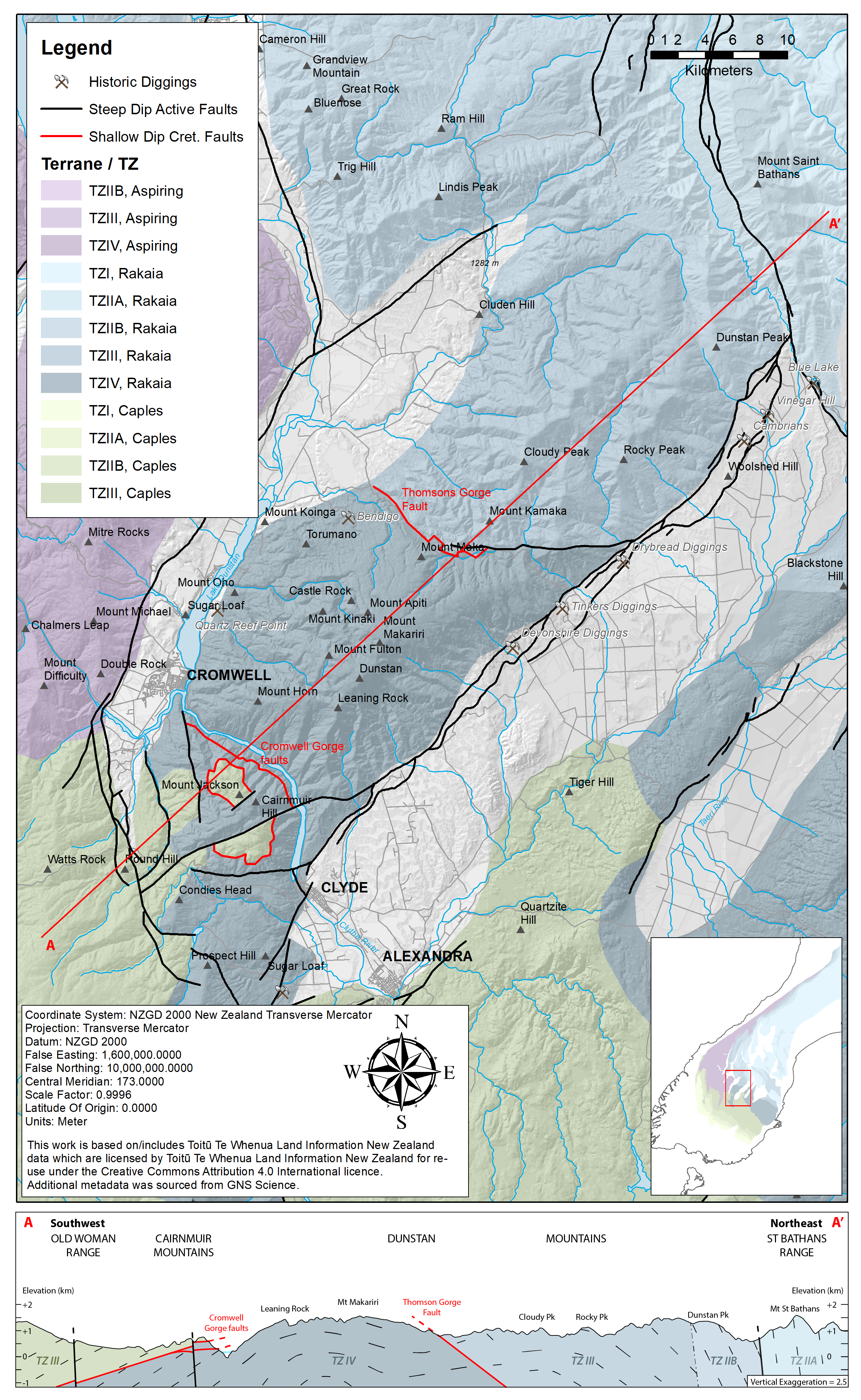
Map and cross section illustrating the textural zones of the Haast Schist in the Dunstan Mountains region, Otago, New Zealand

The Dunstan Mountains, like many Central Otago mountain ranges, are asymmetric antiforms which have formed since the Neogene.

The basement rock is formed from the Haast Schist Group, grey quartzofeldspathic metagreywacke interlayered with micaceous meta-argillite and greenschist formed during the Rangitata Orogeny. The schist in Central Otago has a well-defined pervasive schistosity, with shallow dips defining the broad regional-scale warps in schistosity caused during Miocene deformation (the Kaikoura orogeny). The warped geometries are antiformal over mountain ranges and synformal under the intervening basins. Associated reverse faulting (the Otago fault system) along the south-eastern flanks of many Central Otago mountain ranges (i.e. Taieri Ridge, Lammermoor Range, Rock and Pillar Range, Rough Ridge, Raggedy Range, Dunstan Mountains, Pisa Range) gives rise to the basin and range topography of parallel ridges and basins with steep south-eastern limbs and gently-dipping south-western flanks.

The Dunstan Mountains are a doubly-plunging domal culmination with limbs dipping to the north-west, north-east, south-east and south-west. The core of the mountains in the south are Textural Zone (TZ) IV strongly foliated and segregated garnet-biotite-albite zone schists of the Rakaia terrane. These schists are separated to the north by the gently northeast-dipping normal-slip Thomsons Gorge Fault which places chlorite zone TZ III schist against TZ IV. This low-angle fault zone has resulted in shear zone-hosted gold mineralisation in the form of the Rise and Shine Shear Zone near the Bendigo Goldfields. The Thomson Gorge Fault is a major metamorphic discontinuity, placing lower-grade TZ III schist against higher-grade TZ IV schists; similar low-angle faults are observed in the Cairnmuir Mountains on the south-western side of the Cromwell Gorge where the same relationships are observed. The TZ IV core of the Dunstan Mountains, including the Cairnmuir Mountains, are therefore considered a single range-scale footwall block with the TZ III schists of southern Cairnmuir Mountains and northern Dunstan Mountains as the southern and northern hanging wall blocks, respectively.

=== Landslides ===
Large-scale landslides are a common feature in the Cromwell Gorge and represent a significant geological hazard following the impoundment of the Clutha River behind the Clyde Dam. Seventeen large schist landslides have been mapped along the 18 km (11 mi) length of the gorge. These landslides underwent extensive geo-engineering in the early 1990s to mitigate their movement, and all now have extremely low movement rates as a result. Engineering works included extensive drainage to draw down the groundwater level, toe buttresses and in the case of the Cairnmuir Landslide, a drainage blanket. Thirteen large-diameter tunnels extend into the toes of several landslides in order to drain groundwater which otherwise lubricates the basal shear zone. Combined with smaller drainage tunnels (49 in total), the total extent of the tunnels is 18.5 km (11.5 mi).

On 13 July 2020 a new slip near Cromwell occurred above Deadman's Point Bridge on the true left of Lake Dunstan. The difficulty in accessing the slip resulted in a rather novel remediation technique; helicopters with monsoon buckets were used to sluice loose material and dislodge unstable rock by dropping large quantities of water directly onto the slip. With the establishment of a safe bench to work from, excavators and an abseiling team cleared the remaining loose material over the following days.

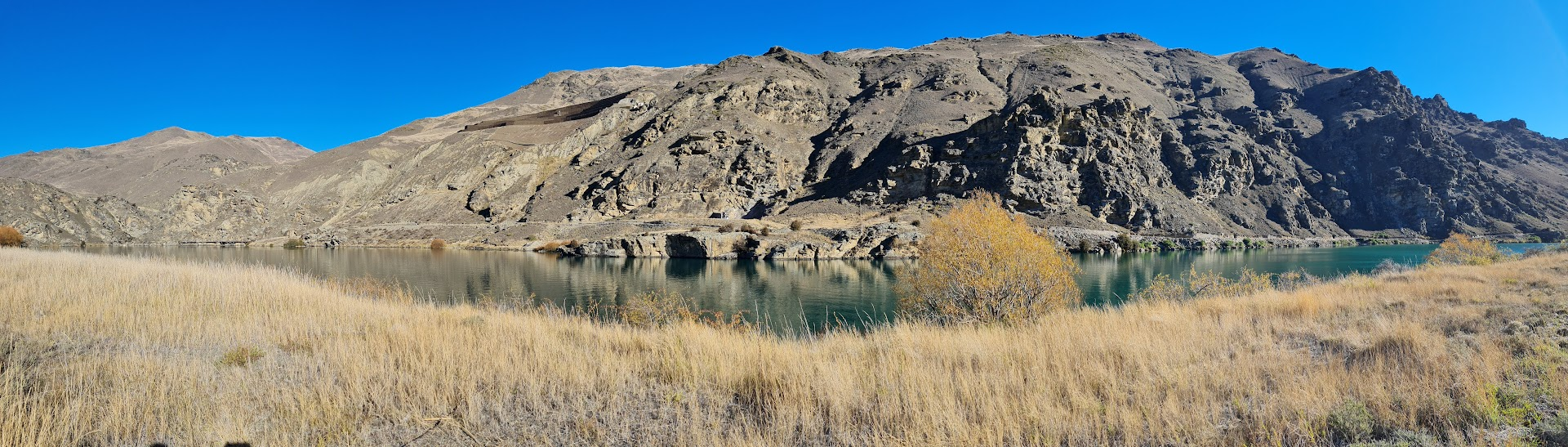
Cairnmuir Mountains from Lake Dunstan, Central Otago. The earthworks and terraces of the Cairnmuir Landslip is visible in the upper centre-left of the photo, while the Cairnmuir tunnel used to drain groundwater from the basal shear zone is visible in the centre of the photo, several metres above lake level.

== History ==
=== Etymology ===
The Dunstan Mountains was named in 1857 by the Chief Surveyor of the Otago Province, John Turnbull Thomson and his assistant Alexander Garvie. The origin of the name Dunstan, as used in Central Otago, is uncertain, but thought to originate either from Dunstanburgh Castle in Northumberland, England, or as a reference to Dunstan, the patron saint of goldsmiths.

Much of the Māori naming of the Dunstan Mountains has been lost to time with the best account being compiled in 1930 by Herries Beattie in the Otago Daily Times. Early Māori settlers referred to the Dunstan Mountains by geographic subdivision into lower (southern), central and upper (northern) portions of the range:

- Tiko-umu – southern end of the range including Leaning Rock. No translation is given for Tiko-umu although tiko has several definitions such as protrude or be conspicuous, while umu means an earth oven
- Mataki-nui – central portion of the range with Castle rock as its pivot. Sherwood-Roberts (1913) gives the translation for Matakanui (note difference in spelling) as big burn on the face
- Neinei-i-kura – northern portion of the range
- Kura-matakitaki – the extension from Dunstan Peak to the Old Man Peak on the Dunstan Range. Kura-matakitaki was apparently a celebrated woman of olden times

The very characteristic rocky tor on the southern end of the Dunstan Mountains, 'Leaning Rock', is called Haehaeata in Māori which means torn in the morning. Leaning Rock was known as 'The Old Woman' by early goldminers in the region, with the Dunstan Mountains being erroneously referred to as the Old Woman Range. (Note: The Old Woman Range is located some 20 km to the southwest of the Dunstan Mountains)

Other traditional Māori named peaks on the Dunstan Mountains are Ritua (Cloudy Peak), O-puaha (Dunstan Peak), Mt Makariri (meaning cold), Mt Kamaka (meaning rock), Mt Apiti and Mt Kīnaki.

=== Māori ===
The first settlers in the region of the Dunstan Mountains were the Māori as they travelled through Central Otago en route to the West Coast on pounamu expeditions, as well as in search of seasonal food resources. The low Thomson Gorge Saddle over the Dunstan Mountains was not the usual route for early Māori however, who used the Lindis Pass in preference to access their summer camps at Lake Hāwea and Lake Wānaka. The Cromwell Gorge was more-frequented, with early Māori archaeological sites concentrated through the gorge on the true left of the former Clutha River. These sites include small Moa hunter camps with associated Moa bones. Four sites have been identified at Rockfall I and II, Italian Creek, Muttontown Gully and Clyde West.

One of the most significant Māori archaeological finds was that of a paddle in Bendigo. Bendigo itself was not important in terms of Māori camp sites, but an established Māori path over Thomsons Saddle, likely used when the Clutha River was in flood, meant that the area had limited Māori artefacts. Early miners in Bendigo Gully reported in 1872 that they had found pounamu weapons and implements in the gravels they were sluicing. The Māori paddle was found by John Evan, who gave it to Vincent Pyke who then donated it to the Otago Museum, which recorded its acquisition in 1877.

=== Pastoral farming ===
Much of the Dunstan Mountains is used for pastoral farming with stations extending from the range spine to both the Clutha and Manuherikia Valleys. The larger pastoral leases on the north-west flank of the Dunstan Mountains are Northburn, Bendigo and Cluden Stations. On the south-east flank the leases are smaller and more numerous but the larger stations are Moutere, Matakanui, and Lauder.

=== Gold mining ===
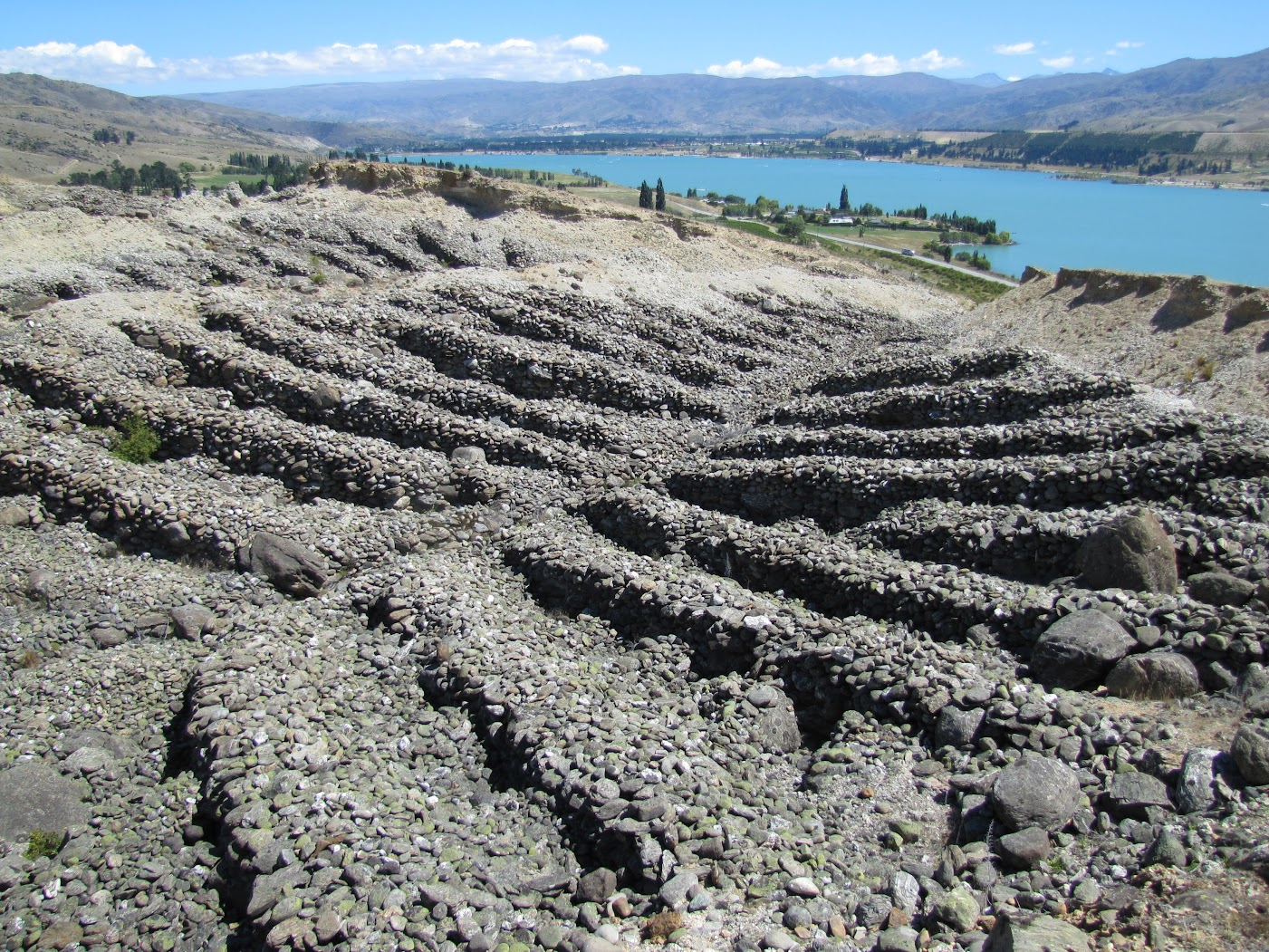
Quartz Reef Point, Northburn Station, Central Otago, New Zealand

Alluvial gold was first discovered in the Cromwell Gorge by prospectors Horatio Hartley and Christopher Reilly in 1862. Hartley and Reilly found 87 lb (32 kg) of gold on a bend of the Clutha River near Brewery Creek, spurring the first gold rush into the Central Otago region.

Historic gold diggings are primarily located along the foot of the south-eastern flank of the Dunstan Mountains (Manuherikia Valley) and include Tinkers, Drybread, Cambrians and Devonshire diggings. The most famous gold mining area on the Dunstan Mountains is that of Bendigo Goldfields, located on the north-western flank of the range. Gold was discovered in Bendigo Creek as a result of the rush to the Dunstan area in September 1862 following Hartley and Reilly's discovery. Close to Bendigo are the Quartz Reef Point Diggings on Northburn Station with their characteristic herringbone tailings.
