= Cromwell Gorge =

River gorge in New Zealand

- (Formerly: Dunstan Gorge)
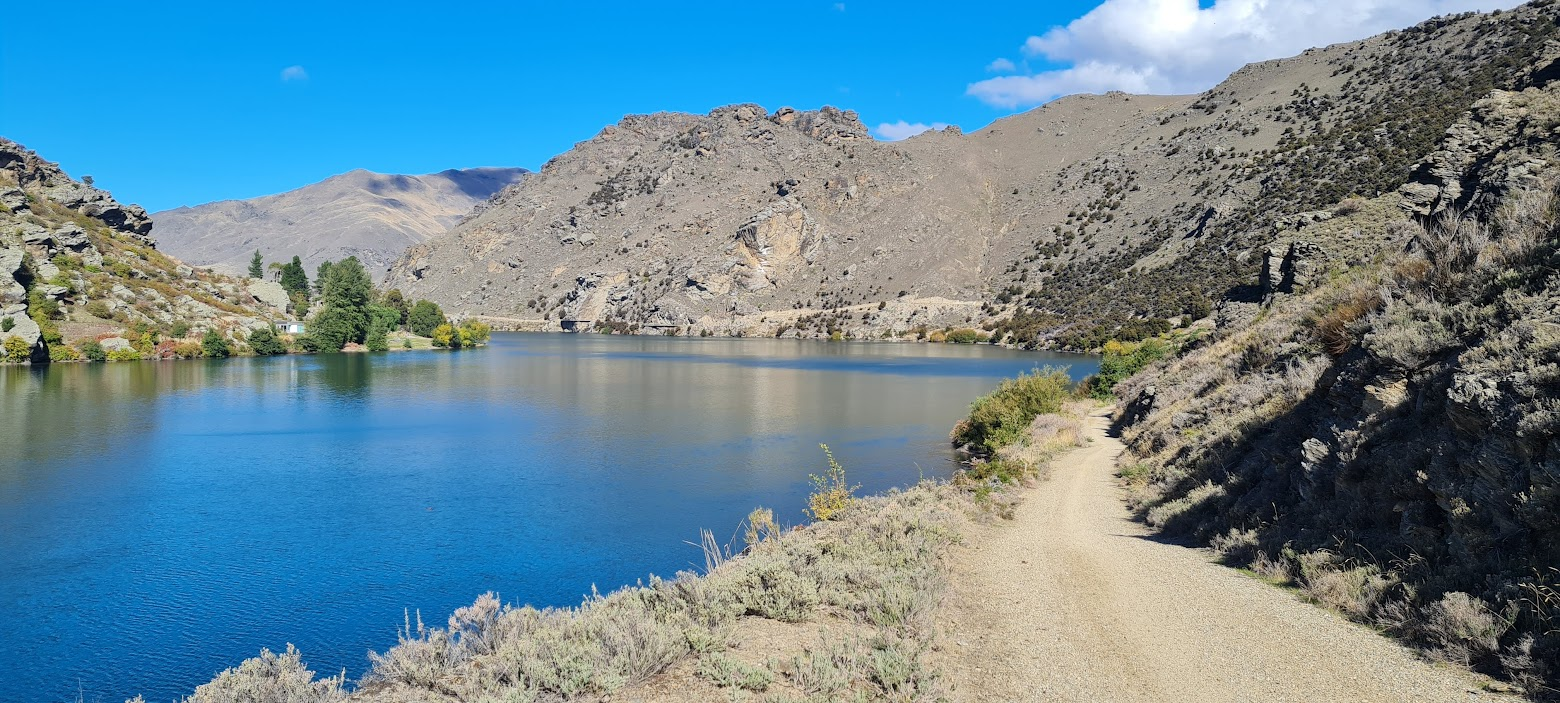
- Miners Rockfall overlooks Lake Dunstan at the northern entrance of the Cromwell Gorge

- Location within New Zealand
- Floor elevation: 194 m (636 ft)
- Length: 18.5 km (11.5 mi) Cromwell to Clyde Dam
- Width: 9 km (5.6 mi) Cairnmuir Hill to Leaning Rock
- Area: 84 km^{2} (32 mi^{2})
- Depth: 1,453 m (4,767 ft)

Geography
- Country: New Zealand
- State/Province: South Island
- District: Central Otago
- Coordinates: 45.104°S 169.292°E
- Topo map: NZMS260 G42 Edition 1 1990
- River: Clutha River / Mata-Au
- Interactive map of Cromwell Gorge
- Depth taken from Leaning Rock (1647 m) to Lake Dunstan (194 m)

The Cromwell Gorge is a steep gorge cut by the former Clutha River (Māori: Mata-Au) in the Central Otago region of New Zealand's South Island. It winds 19 km (12 mi) between the Dunstan and Cairnmuir Mountains, linking the townships of Cromwell and Clyde. It is one of three substantial river gorges in Central Otago, the others being the Kawarau Gorge to the west of Cromwell, and the Roxburgh Gorge south of Alexandra.

Long-associated with gold mining, orchards and the production of stone fruit, the gorge (including part of old Cromwell) was flooded in the early 1990s to form Lake Dunstan behind the hydroelectric Clyde Dam. The former Otago Central Railway which traced the river through the gorge from Clyde was removed, while State Highway 8 was realigned above the newly formed lake.

The Dunstan Trail, a major new cycle route, was opened on the lake's right bank in 2021.

== Geography ==
The Cromwell Gorge formed in response to the uplift of the Dunstan and Cairnmuir Mountains and simultaneous antecedent incision by the Clutha River. At the northern (upstream) entrance to the gorge lies the township of Cromwell, while the township of Clyde lies to the south. To the east, the gorge is bound by the Dunstan Mountains and to the west, the Cairnmuir Mountains. The overall relief from the highest point of the gorge (Leaning Rock, 1647 m) and the floor of the gorge (Lake Dunstan, 194 m) is 1,453 m (4,767 ft).

The Cromwell Gorge is the entrance to the Upper Clutha Valley and was historically an important thoroughfare for early Māori moa hunters, and later pastoralists and gold miners in the late nineteenth century. It remains an important access route into Central Otago's interior via State Highway 8 (SH8).

=== Geology ===
The Cromwell Gorge is dominated by the characteristic rocky tors and craggy outcrops of the Haast Schist Group; grey quartzofeldspathic metagreywacke interlayered with micaceous meta-argillite and greenschist formed during the Rangitata Orogeny. The schist in Central Otago has a well-defined pervasive schistosity, with shallow dips defining the broad regional-scale warps in schistosity caused during Miocene deformation (the Kaikoura orogeny). The warped geometries are antiformal over mountain ranges and synformal under the intervening basins. Associated reverse faulting (the Otago fault system) along the south-eastern flanks of many Central Otago mountain ranges (i.e. Taieri Ridge, Lammermoor Range, Rock and Pillar Range, Rough Ridge, Raggedy Range, Dunstan Mountains, Pisa Range) gives rise to the basin and range topography of parallel ridges and basins with steep south-eastern limbs and gently-dipping north-western flanks.

The Cromwell Gorge exits the Dunstan and Cairnmuir Mountains immediately to the north of Clyde. Both mountain ranges are controlled to the south-east by large reverse faults; the Dunstan Fault and Earnscleugh Fault, respectively. Investigations have found that geologically-recent deformation associated with the Dunstan Fault has extended south-west towards Clyde, rather than being translated along the southern margin of the Cairnmuir Mountains. This is important as it suggests that there is no recent activity on the transfer zone between the Dunstan and Earnscleugh Faults.^{†} This transfer zone is controlled by the well-documented River Channel Fault, a steeply dipping fault mapped as running down the centre of the gorge and directly beneath the Clyde Dam. The former Clutha River followed several of these faults as it coursed through the Cromwell Gorge.

=== Vegetation ===
Vegetation in the Cromwell Gorge has seen considerable change, as has the wider Central Otago region, since at least the Holocene (10,000 years until present). The arrival of humans in Central Otago resulted in particularly extensive changes in vegetation as Māori hunter-gatherers used clearance fires. Early Māori firing of woody cover from about the thirteenth century resulted in a vastly different vegetation in the Cromwell Gorge. Initial woody cover included totara (Podocarpus hallii) and beech forest (Nothofagus menziesii) over what is now a treeless Central Otago.

Grassland and scrub now cover most of Central Otago. On the former valley floor of the Cromwell Gorge, low tussock grassland of several varieties dominated, while manuka, kānuka and matagouri scrub patched the lower slopes. Uncontrolled burn-offs, over-grazing, and the introduction of the rabbit in the mid-1800s, have heavily modified the vegetation cover since European settlement. This is further worsened by Central Otago being the driest region in New Zealand. Those areas of the gorge which are the driest are dominated by cushions of scabweed, sweet briar rosehip, and thyme, all of which flourish. The introduction of thyme to Central Otago is most-often attributed to Jean Desire Feraud, a French goldminer and orchardist who was part of the Otago gold rush.

There is evidence of native plant regeneration (such as kōwhai) in areas where conservation has been put in place, though its reestablishment in the Cromwell Gorge is not nearly as extensive as the nearby Roxburgh Gorge. Forests of kōwhai (Sophora microphylla) have recently been postulated to have also been present in the Cromwell Gorge, upon which moa grazed.

In spring and summer, the gorge is replete with colourful wild flowers, including thyme, Vipers bugloss, Spur valerian, and Californian poppy and stone crop.

== History ==
=== Māori ===
The first settlers in the region were the Māori as they travelled through Central Otago en route to the West Coast on pounamu expeditions, as well as in search of seasonal food resources. Although the Lindis Pass was the usual route for early Māori to access their summer camps at Lake Hāwea and Lake Wānaka, there is sufficient evidence the Cromwell Gorge was used as an important thoroughfare. Early Māori archaeological sites are concentrated through the gorge, particularly on the true left of the former Clutha River, and include small moa hunter camps with associated moa bones. Four sites have been identified at Rockfall I and II, Italian Creek, Muttontown Gully and Clyde West.

Evidence for Māori occupation of specific sites in the Cromwell Gorge was well-documented during the Clutha Valley Archaeological Project resulting from the decision to build the Clyde Dam. Despite the limited number of samples available, rock shelters and adjacent sites showed the following finds to be culturally significant:

==== Italian Creek ====
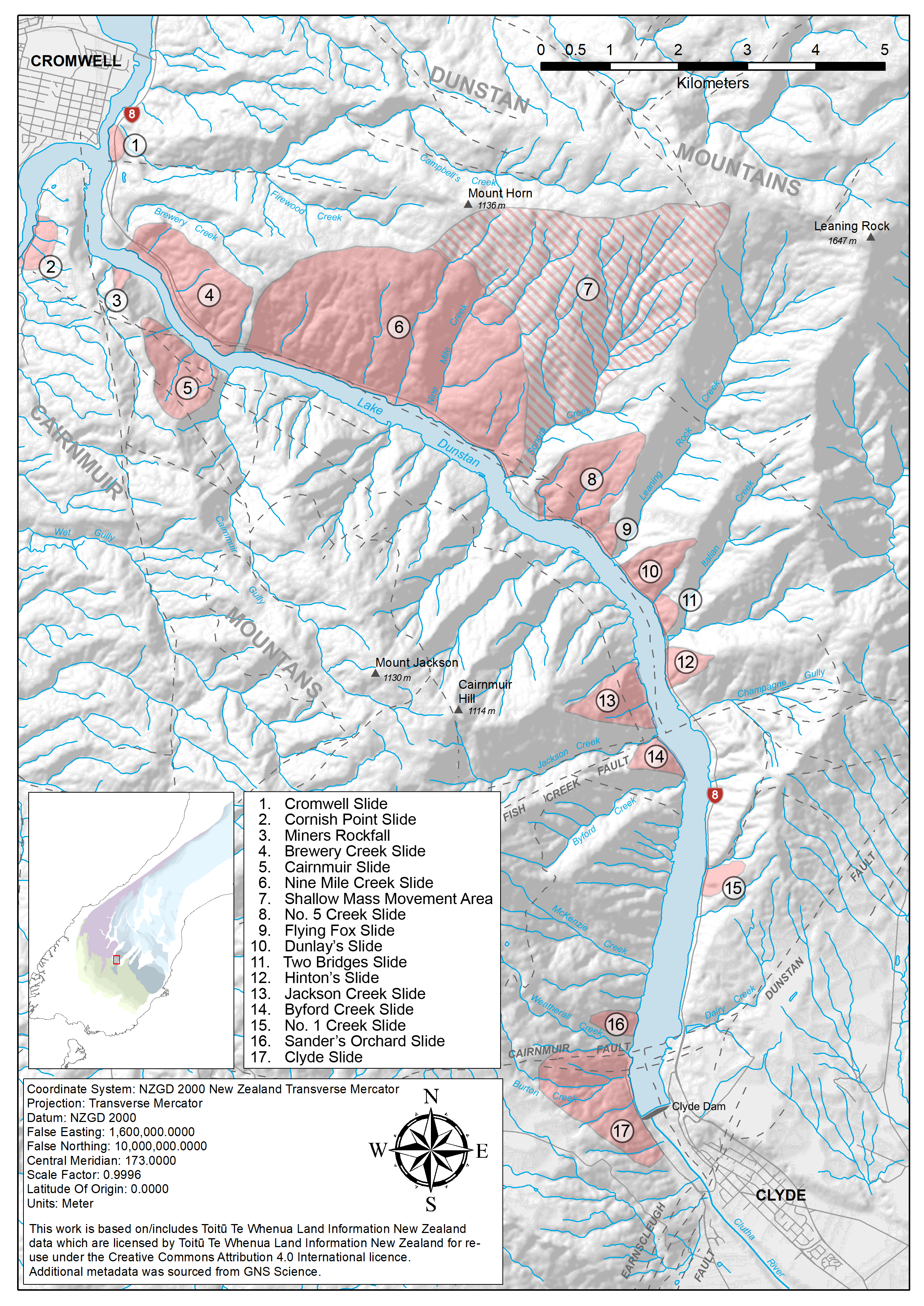
Map of the Cromwell Gorge illustrating Lake Dunstan, the Clyde Dam, faults and landslides.

- (45.1175°S 169.3146°E)
- Eel net (purangi) which may have been abandoned in transit, or left with the expectation of returning for it
- Cooked remains of a Kākā
- Moa bone and egg shell fragments

==== Rockfall I & II ====
- (45.0797°S 169.2365°E)
- Two prehistoric occupations
- Oven-charcoal identifications
- Tuatara bone fragments
- Moa bone and egg shell fragments

==== Muttontown Gully ====
- (45.14827°S 169.31279°E)
- A slab of flint from which about one dozen flakes lying beside it had been chipped

It has been suggested that the numerous overhangs within the craggy rock formations of the Central Otago river gorges may have been favoured moa nesting locations. Such locations abound in the Cromwell Gorge and eggshell fragments found in many shelters confirm their usage. If early Māori hunters recognised such a regularity in moa ecology, it seems likely that they would undertake seasonal or regular raids on nesting areas.

=== European settlement ===
The first European to set eyes on the Cromwell Gorge was Nathanael Chalmers who first traversed the valley in 1853, accompanied by two Māori guides: Reko, a Ngāi Tahu chief from Tuturau, and Kaikōura, a man who had run away from the Kaikōura ranges.

Chalmers made his trip into Central Otago's interior when no roads or tracks existed, hoping to retrace the steps that his guide, Reko, had made from the Waitaki some twenty years earlier. The trek from the Mataura River in Southland to Waitaki was some 400 km (250 mi) distance, climbing mountain passes in excess of 1,000 m (3,300 ft) – something Chalmers was blissfully ignorant of ahead of his expedition. Unfortunately for Chalmers, he contracted a bout of chronic diarrhoea early into his trip and suffered with it for many weeks. Having eventually made it as far as Lakes Wakatipu, Hāwea and Wānaka, his illness got the better of him and he realised he would not be able to make it to Waitaki.

In a letter to historian Herries Beattie, Chalmers recorded his account of the journey (some fifty seven years after the fact) stating that the shortest way back to Southland would be to build a flax fibre mokihi or raft and ride it all the way down the Clutha River. As they set off from Lake Hāwea and entered the Clutha Rive, Chalmers wrote that they:

... paddled down the river so rapidly that I could hardly credit our speed

— Nathanael Chalmers, 1910

Within half a day, they came to the Clutha's junction with the Kawarau River, leading Chalmers to write:

The water flow almost doubled and was suddenly confined in the great Cromwell Gorge ... I shall never forget the "race" through the gorge ... my heart was literally in my mouth, but those two old men seemed to care nothing for the current.

— Nathanael Chalmers, 1910

When they emerged from the gorge at the site of the present-day Clyde Dam, he wrote "then our troubles were over".

Chalmers' early foray into Central Otago was closely followed in the mid 1850s by early pastoralists and runholders searching for sheep grazing land in the vast, trackless interior. It was only after surveyor John Turnbull Thomson and Alexander Garvie lead a reconnaissance survey of the region in 1857-58, that pastoralists moved into the area in earnest; within a year of Turnbull's survey some 4×10^{6} acres (1.6×10^{6} ha) had been applied for.

=== Gold ===
The Cromwell Gorge was the site of Central Otago's first gold rush into the region's interior and followed soon after the discovery of gold at Gabriel's Gully near Lawrence. The initial rush to the gorge, referred to as the Dunstan goldfield, began on 16 August 1862 following an announcement in the Otago Daily Times that two men, Hartley and Reilly, had discovered 87 lb (1044 t oz) of gold.

The winter of 1862 was exceptionally severe and resulted in unseasonably low-levels of the Clutha River. Horatio Hartley and Christopher Reilly worked the sides of the Cromwell Gorge for three months until they were forced to take the huge hoard of gold they had secretly amassed to the Chief Gold Receiver in Dunedin in August 1862. Hartley and Reilly's discovery caused great excitement as they deposited some 87 lb (1,390 oz) of gold, sparking a gold rush to what would become known as Hartley's Beach. Hartley and Reilly, in divulging the location of their rich finds (approximately one mile downstream of the Clutha River's confluence with the Kawarau River), were rewarded with £2000 from the Otago Provincial Government. On 23 September 1862 the Dunstan goldfield was proclaimed, the selection of this name in preference to Hartley's being largely in deference to Reilly, who was 'jealous of the pre-eminence' accorded Hartley as the discoverer.

Within days of the announcement of Hartley and Reilly's discovery, 2000 miners had descended on the Dunstan goldfield with the first gold export to leave the goldfield on 6 October 1862 carrying some 6030 t oz (187.5 kg) of gold. Between 1 September 1862 and 1 April 1863, 120,886 t oz (3760 kg) of gold were recovered from Otago, with most of this coming from the Dunstan goldfield. By the end of 1864 the easily won gold had been mined and many had moved off to other more lucrative fields.

==== Dredges ====
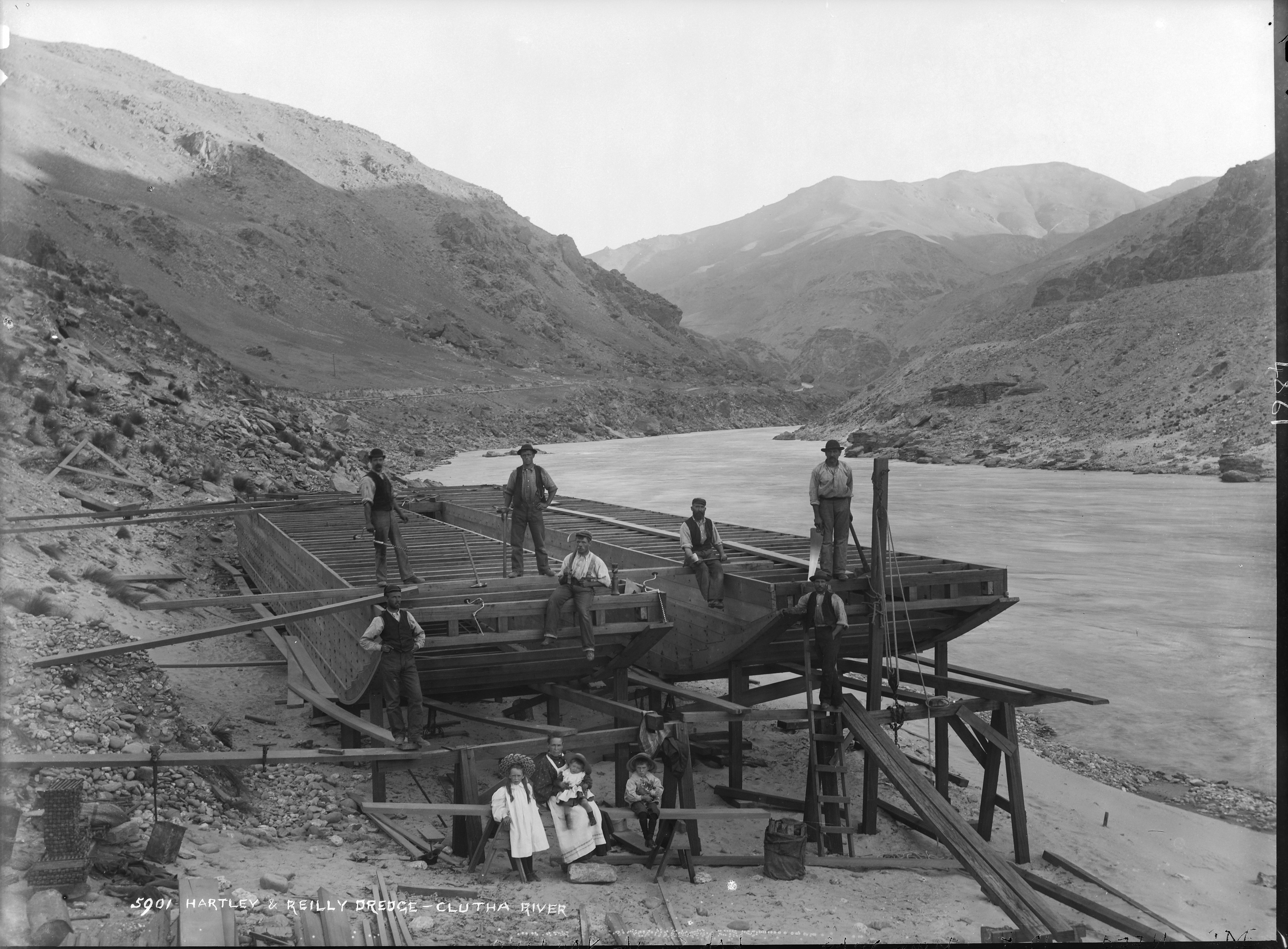
Construction of the Hartley and Reilly Dredge next to the Clutha River in the Cromwell Gorge, 1890s

At the turn of the twentieth century, the gorge would once again see a feverish gold rush, but this time on a more industrial scale as large mechanical dredges made large returns. In 1900 there were 187 dredges being operated on the Clutha River, but like the earlier gold rush, the times of the dredges drew to a close only several years later.

==== Chinese miners ====
In 1865, the Otago Provincial Council invited Chinese miners working on the Victorian goldfields in Australia, to rework the Otago goldfields. European miners had departed in their droves for more lucrative goldfields in Marlborough and the West Coast, opening the door for Chinese mining immigrants to come directly from China, particularly Guangdong province.

Many mined in the gorge where they lived a hard life in harsh conditions, often in rock shelters. The first camp established was near Gibraltar Rock (45.0773°S 169.2329°E) in the Cromwell Gorge, although a far more substantial settlement in the 1870s formed Cromwell's Chinatown. Deserted by the turn of the century, the wooden stores and businesses were demolished in 1930.

Chinese were not always popular or welcome, and often blamed for things they did not do. This was made more problematic due to the manner by which they were initially invited to New Zealand; the Chinese regarded themselves as temporary visitors seeking gold. As such they tended to have little interaction with Europeans, and the importance of their place in Central Otago's history has often been overlooked.

=== Railway ===
A railway to Cromwell had been proposed at least as early as 1877, although it was intended to link the Lakes District (Kingston/Queenstown) via the Kawerau Gorge and not the Cromwell Gorge at the time. Reference to a railway, presumably through the Cromwell Gorge, linking to the Taieri Railway was also made in 1877, but nothing would come of this for another thirty years.

The railway finally made it as far as Clyde in 1907, with the station's official opening on 2 April 1907 by the prime minister, William Hall-Jones. The Cromwell Railway and Progress League, having been formed in 1906 to influence the extension of the railway through the gorge to Cromwell, set about lobbying the Government with increasing frequency. However, work on the railway line stopped at Clyde until 1914. The lobby group stressed the high cost of transport between Cromwell and Clyde, the impact on the region's farmers and also pointed to the inadequacies of the road:

The road through the gorge is a narrow one, with some very sharp bends, and at the best of times it is dangerous with a considerable amount of horse traffic, and an accident at any point of the gorge means sudden death.

— Otago Central Railway League, Evening Star, 24 February 1911

"Irrigation first", was the Government's reply, reflecting their desire to harness the economic benefits of the Country's nascent agricultural potential. The Government's response was nothing new, having espoused this priority since at least 1899. This would not stop the representations, however.

An announcement to restart the railway extension was made in March 1914, and works were established in the following months with new surveys taking place. The railway started in earnest in September and by the end of 1916 some 8.5 mi (13.7 km) of rail had been laid. The line to Cromwell was not completed until July 1921 – significantly overrunning the predicted two to three years it would take. An E class (Double Fairlie locomotive), Josephine, which pulled all the trains in the gorge during the construction era, is now a museum piece in the Otago Settlers Museum.

Cromwell was the terminus of the Otago Central Railway and consisted of a railway station building, five staff houses, a 6000 gallon locomotive watering tank, stockyards, an engine-shed, turntable coal facilities and the station sidings were able to accommodate nearly 100 wagons. At the time, it was by far the most economic way to get the region's produce to Dunedin and was a boon for the runholders of Waenga Station and the orchardists in the gorge.

With the coming of the Clyde dam, the Cromwell-Clyde railway was closed in 1980. When the dam itself was completed, the line to Clyde had little other traffic and the section from Middlemarch to Clyde was closed on 30 April 1990. The line beyond Middlemarch was lifted during 1991, and the track-bed as far as Clyde was handed over to the Department of Conservation in 1993, becoming the Otago Central Rail Trail.

=== Orchards ===
Orchardists moved to the gorge because of its frost-free springs. Orchards, grown on both sides of the Clutha River, primarily produced stone fruits (particularly apricots, cherries, nectarines, peaches, plums) as well as a number of varieties of apples and pears. The Cromwell Gorge had a microclimate that meant that orchardists would not need to burn smoke pots to save the fruit from spring frosts and importantly, the crop ripened ahead of the apricots grown in orchards in (e.g.) Earnscleugh or Cromwell. This made the Cromwell Gorge unique in the region and subsequently it produced some of New Zealand's best fruit.

The Annan's were one of the first families to establish an orchard at the southern end of the gorge on what would become Fruitgrowers Road. In 1901 William Annan cleared his piece of land, built a cob shelter, and planted his fruit trees. Imported from Australia, the first trees Annan planted were a diverse mix to test what would be most suitable for the challenging Central Otago climate and included citrus, almond, walnut, cherry, apricot, apple, pear, peach, nectarine, quince and grape. By 1914 he had a healthy orchard and was mentioned in the Evening Star as part of an exhibition of fruit from Central Otago.

The last orchardist to leave the Cromwell Gorge ahead of inundation by Lake Dunstan, was Kevin Jackson, who had run an orchard in the gorge from 1969–1989. Jackson and many others whose livelihoods would be irrevocably damaged by the filling of the dam challenged the Government, but to no avail. Only a few trees from what was Jackson's orchard (45.0852°N 169.2637°E) still remain at the edge the lake.

The reservoir behind the Clyde dam flooded a total of 2,300 ha (5,700 acres) of productive land, including twelve large orchards on the river terraces along both sides of the Cromwell Gorge, five orchards at Lowburn, and fertile farmlands on both sides of the Clutha River in the Lowburn area.

== Clyde Dam project ==
Initial thoughts on harnessing the Clutha River for hydroelectric power occurred at least as early as 1904, but it was not until the 1940s that it began to be a more serious option for power in Otago. An examination of the Clutha River's potential in 1944 culminated in the selection and construction of the Roxburgh Dam with first power being produced in 1956. By 1968, the Government felt that the Clutha River was under-utilised, especially in comparison to the Waitaki River which by this time had the Waitaki Dam, Benmore Dam and Aviemore Dam. The same year, a committee was set up to investigate additional hydroelectric options on the Clutha River and by 1971 had come up with six potential options (Schemes A through F). These would later (1973) be added to by several additional schemes, in particular Scheme H which called for a low dam at Clyde that would minimise the size of the reservoir. The Labour Government in 1975 selected Scheme H but a change in government to Robert Muldoon's National Party in 1976 reversed this decision, opting instead for Scheme F, a high dam to be built at Clyde which would impact the Cromwell Gorge, Cromwell, the Kawerau Arm and Lowburn. The impact on existing activities from any scheme was recognised from the outset:

Any further Clutha Valley development poses a very complex problem as there are considerable areas of better lands, orchards, allied industries, communication routes, closer settlement, and whole townships or effects on townships and local bodies to be taken into account.

— Upper Clutha Hydro-Electric Interdepartmental Committee, December 1971

Protests that the dam would flood established orchards, the railway, State Highway 8 as well as parts of Cromwell were all ignored with the high dam becoming part of the National Government's Think Big policy.

=== Clyde Dam ===
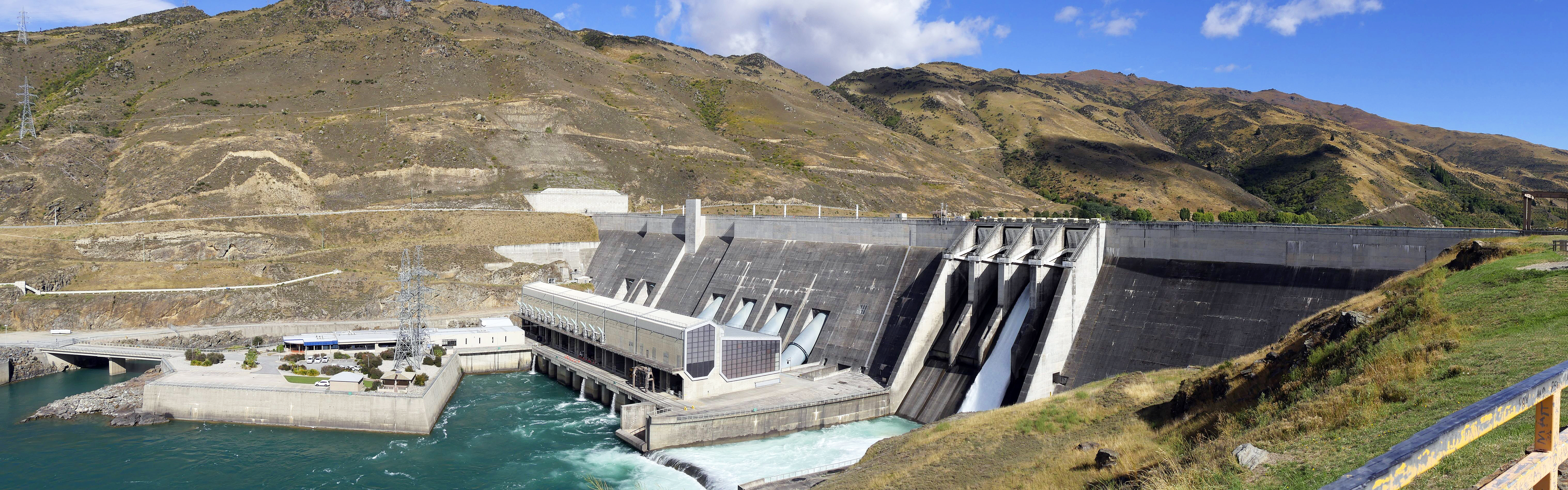
Clyde Dam with Power Station

Construction of the Clyde Dam was started in 1977 and first required the excavation of a diversion channel for the Clutha River. The diversion channel was cut down 22 m (72 ft) into the gravel and bedrock on the true right bank of the river. At 50 m (160 ft) wide and 700 m (2,300 ft) long, it facilitated the safe construction of the remainder of the dam. The river was diverted in 1982, at which point temporary coffer dams had been conducted to enable building of the dam's concrete superstructure. A cable crane attached to pylons delivered the majority of the 1.2×10^{6} m^{3} (42×10^{6} cu ft) of concrete required to build the dam and its associated powerhouse. At its peak between 1986 and 1987, approximately 1000 dam workers were on site. The dam was completed in 1990, however it was not commissioned until 1992 at a total cost of $955M NZD (September 1987). The cost of the dam was made up of Ministry of Works and Development civil works for Clyde: $591 million; Electricorp works, Clyde: $175 million; road realignment works: $100 million; property compensation: $24 million; Cromwell Township: $65 million. The roadworks figures would later significantly inflate due to costs incurred during landslide stabilisation in the gorge.

Work during the dam's early construction phase in 1982 identified numerous faults and shear zones beneath the dam – in particular, the River Channel Fault. Despite considerable amounts of concrete being pumped into tunnels across the fault to act as shear pins, the faults posed a significant risk and forced a redesign of the dam leading to the incorporation of a controversial slip joint. The slip joint is designed to accommodate up to 2 m (6.6 ft) of lateral fault movement and 1 m (3.3 ft) of vertical movement. Geologists at the time considered there was a low to very-low possibility of movement along the Dunstan Fault upstream of the dam in the event of a major earthquake; such a movement could lead to up to 200 mm (7.9 in) of relative movement on the River Channel Fault at the dam site.

=== Cultural and archaeological losses ===
The filling of the Clyde Dam resulted in the loss of significant sites of cultural interest in the Cromwell Gorge and other areas inundated by Lake Dunstan. Knowing this would be the case, the Ministry of Works commissioned archaeological surveys of the gorge and surrounding areas that would be impacted by the filling of Lake Dunstan. The initial studies in 1976–1977 revealed that more than 150 sites would be affected by the filling of the proposed dam(s) in the Cromwell Gorge. Given the large number of sites affected, a project archaeologist was employed for an initial period of five years, which was later increased to ten years due to the sheer enormity of excavating and cataloguing the sites which would be impacted by the damming of the Clutha River.

Unlike the Roxburgh Gorge, where no archaeological survey was ever undertaken before the Roxburgh Dam was built, the Cromwell Gorge would reveal a rich wealth of mining era (1862-1890) and some pre-European sites. In all, 44 rock shelters were recorded in the Cromwell Gorge.

Over the duration of the project, approximately 2000 sites were added to the national site recording scheme with almost every farm in the Upper Clutha being systematically surveyed.

Perhaps the greatest site of interest of the entire ten-year project was the excavation of Cromwell's Chinatown at the confluence of the Clutha and Kawarau Rivers. The site had been abandoned since the 1920s when it was excavated over a 10-week period in 1980, many of the artifacts going on display in the Cromwell Museum.

Ritchie (1989) presented a compilation of 617 sites of archaeological significance, 85 of which were submerged in the Cromwell Gorge due to the filling of Lake Dunstan. A total of 250 sites were lost in the greater Lake Dunstan area due to the filling of the lake.

Archaeological sites near and flooded by Lake Dunstan. Data source: Ritchie (1989)

=== Landslides ===
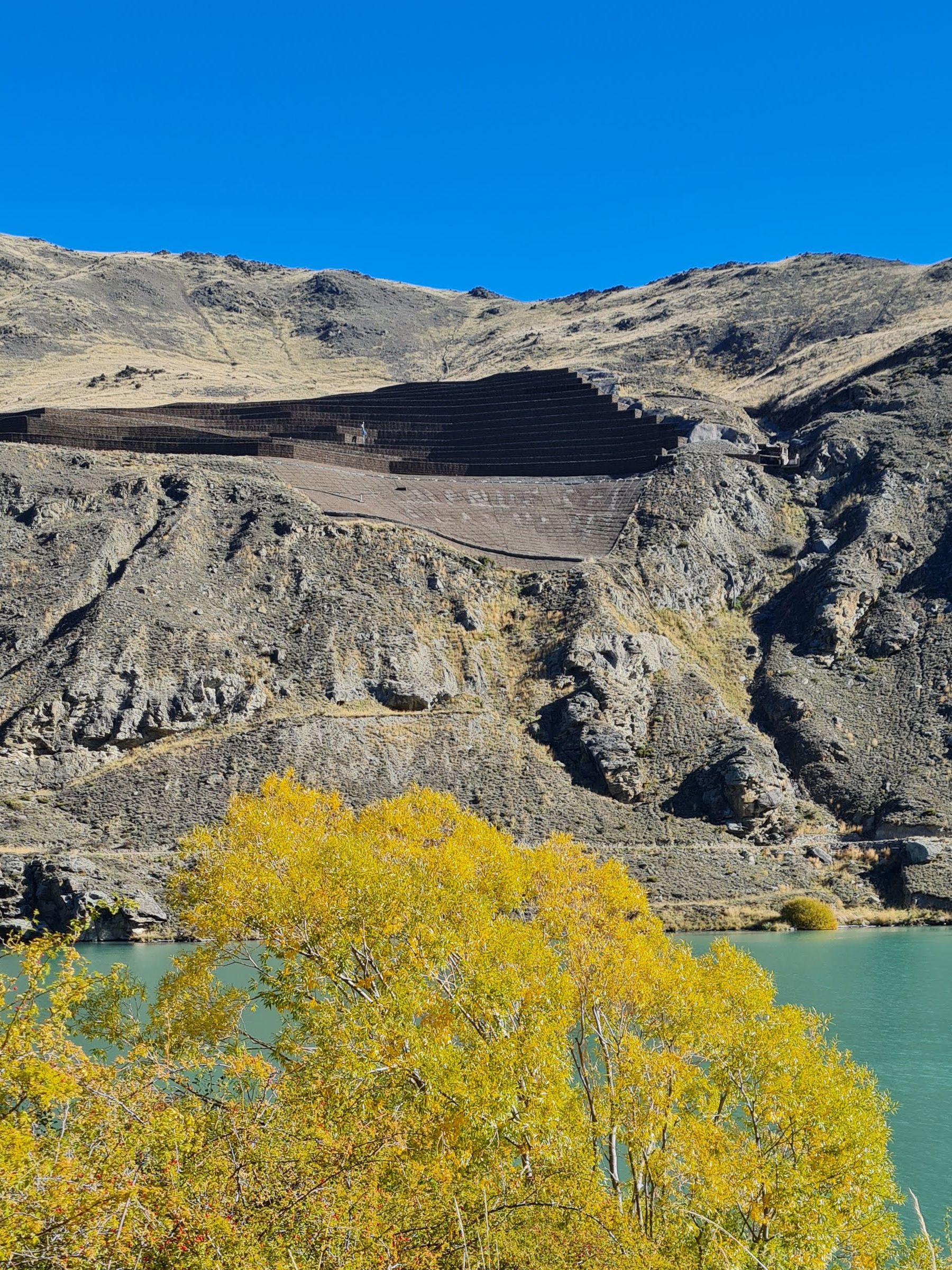
View of the Cairnmuir Landslide stabilisation terraces (drainage blanket) in the Cromwell Gorge

Large-scale landslides are a common feature in the Cromwell Gorge and represent a significant geological hazard following the impoundment of the Clutha River behind the Clyde Dam. Seventeen large schist landslides have been mapped along the length of the gorge. These landslides underwent extensive geo-engineering in the early 1990s to mitigate their movement, and all now have extremely low movement rates as a result. Engineering works included extensive drainage to draw down the groundwater level, toe buttresses and in the case of the Cairnmuir Landslide, a drainage blanket. Thirteen large-diameter tunnels extend into the toes of several landslides in order to drain groundwater which otherwise lubricates the basal shear zone. Combined with smaller drainage tunnels (49 in total), the total extent of the tunnels is 18.5 km (11.5 mi). In addition to the mitigation measures, some 6500 instruments have been installed to measure and monitor slide movement.

On 13 July 2020 a new slip near Cromwell occurred above Deadman's Point Bridge on the true left of Lake Dunstan. The difficulty in accessing the slip resulted in a rather novel remediation technique; helicopters with monsoon buckets were used to sluice loose material and dislodge unstable rock by dropping large quantities of water directly onto the slip. With the establishment of a safe bench to work from, excavators and an abseiling team cleared the remaining loose material over the following days.

=== Controversy ===
The Clyde Dam has rarely been without controversy since its inception. The dam has forever changed the landscape and the lives of people impacted by the filling of Lake Dunstan.

One of the Clyde Dam's most vocal critics was Gerald Lensen, a geologist and the former head of Earth Deformation at the DSIR. Lensen had argued on numerous occasions that the Clyde Dam was unsafe, having been built on an active fault zone.

The National Party's Think Big economic policy was heavily criticised and debated during the early stages of the dam construction, and the dam was protested extensively by all those affected by it. Workers unions during the construction of the dam held many strikes.

As the landslide stabilisation of the Cairnmuir Slide neared completion, a protest slogan was painted on the lower portion of the drainage apron which read Hands Off Beaumont referring to the potential of a further dam being built near Beaumont, downstream on the Clutha River. The remnants of this graffiti are still visible.

Wider impacts with the filling of Lake Dustan have continued to impact communities with the spread of lagarosiphon (lake weed), and the continued sedimentation and silting-up of the Kawerau Arm of Lake Dunstan.

== Access ==
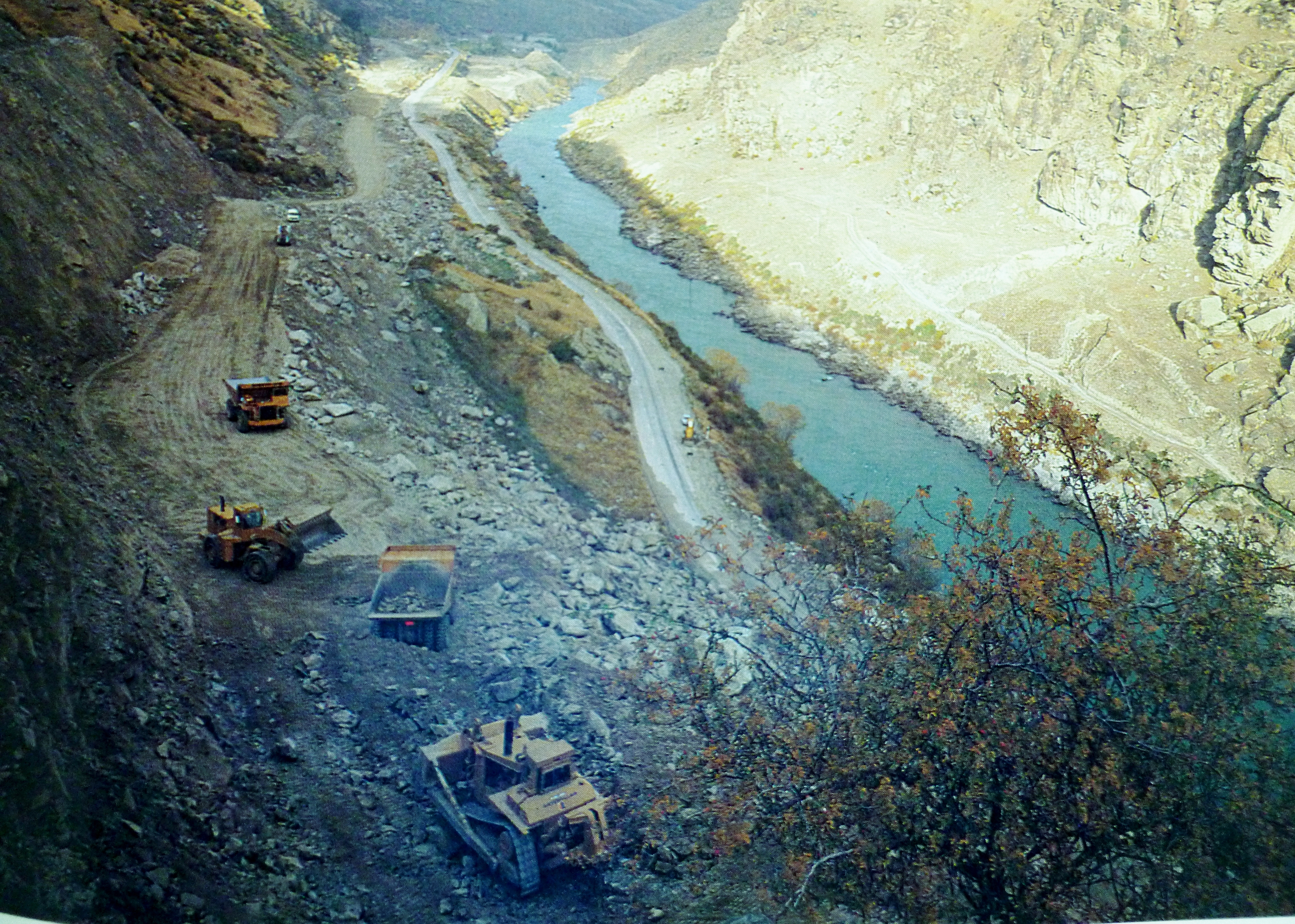
State Highway 8 realignment work underway near Gibraltar Rock in the Cromwell Gorge

The Cromwell Gorge is accessed primarily by two routes. On the true left bank of Lake Dunstan runs State Highway 8, a single carriageway linking Clyde to Cromwell via Deadman's Point Bridge. On the true right bank of Lake Dunstan is the Dunstan Cycle Trail, a purpose built cycle path which extends the existing Otago Central Rail Trail.

Lake Dunstan itself is navigable from the Clyde Dam through the gorge to Cromwell and beyond.

=== State Highway 8 ===
Lake Dunstan floods the site of the old State Highway 8 (SH8) and former rail line from Clyde to Cromwell. Rail services to Cromwell had ceased by 1980 and therefore a new line to Cromwell was not required ahead of Lake Dunstan being filled. The realignment of SH8 was necessary and was constructed above the shore line of the true left of the gorge (above the former SH8 on the floor of the gorge).

==== Road realignment ====
The Clyde power project roading construction took a total of ten years and involved 50 km (31 mi) of roading and several bridges and culverts. Twenty major contracts were involved and at least 20×10^{6} m^{3} (710×10^{6} cu ft) of rock and gravel moved. New bridges were constructed at Cromwell (Deadman's Point Bridge), Bannockburn and Lowburn. New road sections were required on both sides of Lake Dunstan out of Cromwell to the north:

- 4 km (2.5 mi) were realigned from Cromwell to Lowburn, and a further 4 km after Lowburn toward Wānaka
- 13 km (8.1 mi) were realigned between Cromwell and Tarras on the true left of Lake Dunstan
- 22 km (14 mi) were realigned through the Cromwell Gorge – the most challenging road section due to the stabilisation required for numerous slips

The final section of road through the Cromwell Gorge was opened in 1988.

The realignment of SH8 directly affected twenty nine sites of archaeological significance. The majority of the sites were associated with heritage gold mining activities (stone walled buildings, stone walls, dams, water races, stone stacks), although six sites were pre-historic rock shelters.

Moa finds continued during roadworks; the remains of at least five moas were successfully recovered when a wary bulldozer operator noticed moa bone fragments at the top of his blade while realigning the road section above the old Cromwell Railway site.

=== Lake Dunstan Trail ===
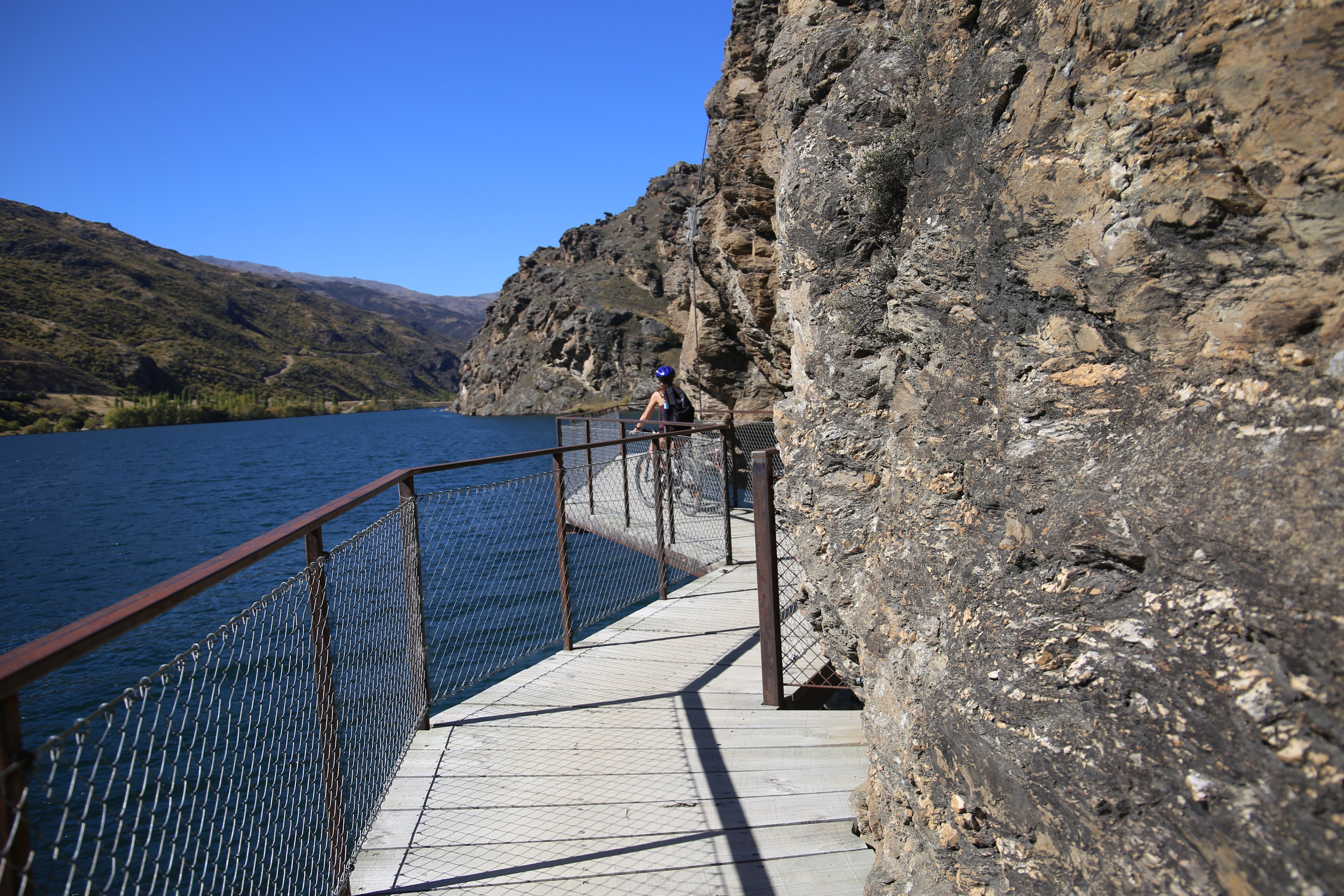
Cantilevered boardwalk section of the Dunstan Cycle Trail through the Cromwell Gorge. The boardwalk is attached to rock bluffs of the Cairnmuir Mountains which plunge into Lake Dunstan.

In May 2021 the Lake Dustan Trail was opened through the Cromwell Gorge. Although it does not form part of the existing Otago Central Rail Trail, it is a purpose-built extension on the opposite true right side of the gorge, running along the foot of the Cairnmuir Mountains. The Lake Dustan Trail links Clyde and Cromwell, offering cyclists and walkers a Grade 2–3 (easy–intermediate) route across bridges, switchbacks, cantilevered boardwalks pinned to sheer bluffs suspended above Lake Dunstan, or the gentle rolling vineyards of Bannockburn.

The trail through the gorge from Clyde to Cromwell's Historical Precinct is 41.2 km (25.6 mi), although the trail currently extends a further 16.4 km (10.2 mi) north of Cromwell along the western shore of Lake Dunstan.

=== Gorge guardian sculpture ===
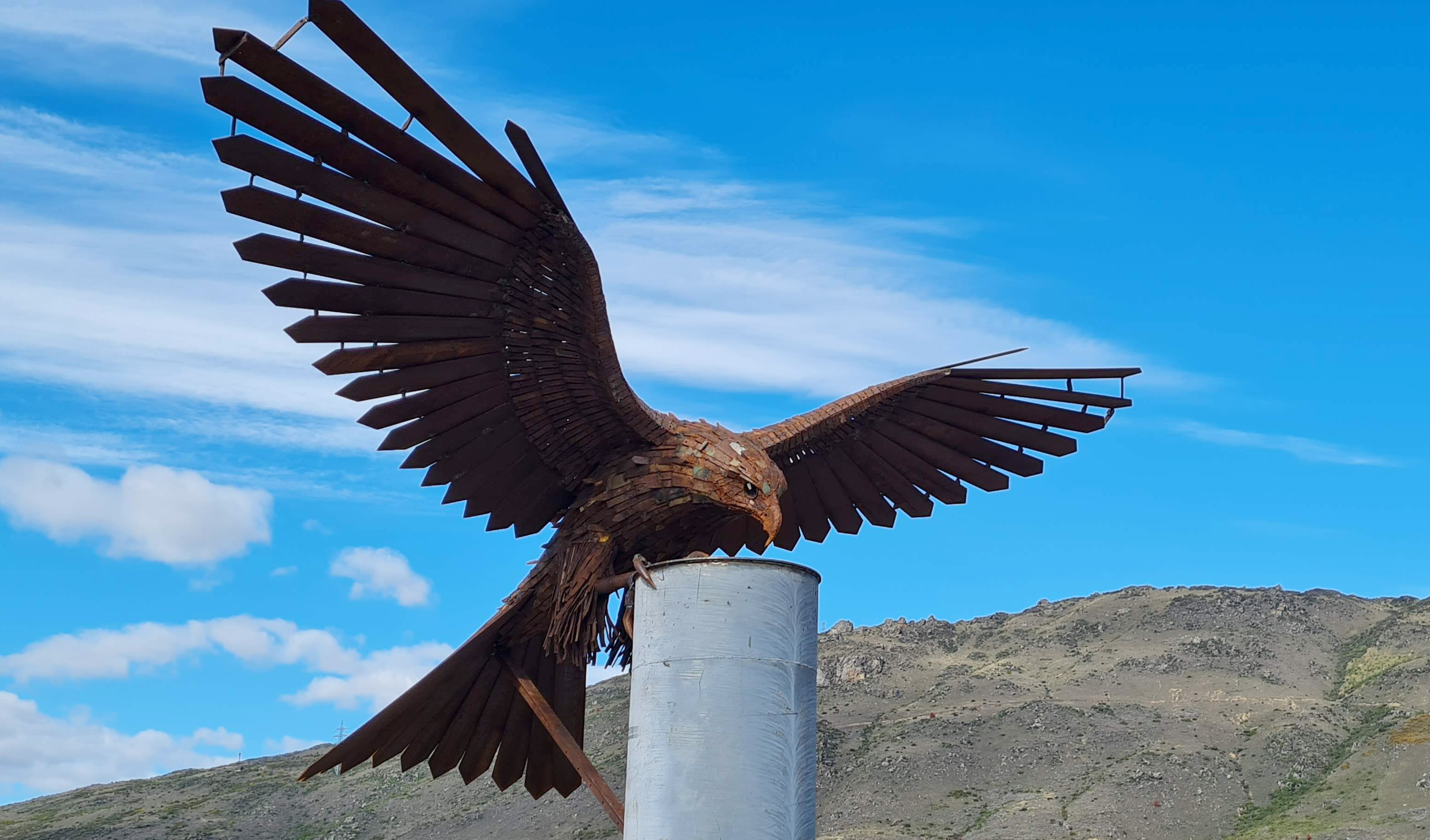
Kārearea (New Zealand Falcon) sculpture above Clyde Dam by artist Dan Kelly

On 21 October 2023 the Historic Clyde Incorporated Charitable Society unveiled a steel sculpture of a Kārearea (New Zealand falcon), erected overlooking the Clyde dam at the entrance to the gorge. The 5 m (16 ft) sculpture by artist Dan Kelly is fashioned from recycled steel, and will stand as guardian to the gorge and the township of Clyde below.

== See also ==
- Kawarau Gorge
- Otago Central Rail Trail
- Lake Dunstan

== Notes ==
^† Despite a lack of recent movement near the Clyde Dam, the recurrence interval for the Dunstan Fault is estimated to be ~7000 years
