= Lloyd Godman =

New Zealand ecological artist

Lloyd John Godman (17 January 1952 – 19 December 2023) was a photographer and ecological artist from New Zealand, later active in Australia. He used living plants within his artworks and installations. His work is included in the permanent collections of Te Papa Museum, Christchurch Art Gallery, Auckland Art Gallery and the Dunedin Public Art Gallery.

== Early life and education ==
Godman left school aged 15 to be an electrical apprentice at the Evening Star, a local newspaper in Dunedin (later bought by and merged with the Otago Daily Times), where he was introduced to photography. After this time he photographed touring rock bands by push processing colour film, and took images of The Rolling Stones, Led Zeppelin, Black Sabbath and Joe Cocker. Some of these photographs have since been published in Vogue magazine, Rolling Stones Gear and in The Gigs that Rocked New Zealand, and for the 2020 Deluxe edition of the Rolling Stones' Goats Head Soup.

Godman completed a Diploma of Photography from the Modern School of Photography at Rochester Institute of Technology, New York in 1983, attended a Bachelor of Arts at University of Otago, New Zealand between 1993 and 1997, and completed a Master of Fine Arts at RMIT University, Melbourne in 1999.

== Art practice ==
After 1983 Godman’s art practice centred around environmental issues, and he adapted his creative approach and use of mediums according to the needs of each project. Godman’s installations were the result of a unique blend of botanical science, environmental awareness and artistic expression. All three elements were intrinsic to the practical realisation of his polymathic vision.

== Work and exhibitions ==
The first major project Godman engaged in was The Last Rivers Song. This project focused on the imminent destruction of the wild rapids of the Clutha River that would become Lake Dunstan once the controversial Clyde Dam was complete. The work included large photo-murals over 6 metres long, with some prints gold-toned from gold extracted from the Clutha River, which were first exhibited at the Dunedin Public Art Gallery in 1984.

Another project in 1985-86: Secrets of the Forgotten Tapu, focused on the columnar basalt formations at Blackhead, Dunedin, which were under threat from quarrying. This project gained sufficient attention that “a group called Friends of Blackhead was formed to lead a protest against the wholesale quarrying of the area,” and was successful in obtaining a covenant in protecting part of the headland. In 1989 Godman was part of Southland Art Foundation's artist in residency program, which saw eleven artists spend time on New Zealand’s Subantarctic Islands, with an extensive touring exhibition that followed, and the work was included in the collections of Christchurch Gallery and Auckland Art Gallery. The experience at the remote Auckland Islands saw Godman move to camera-less photography and the use of photograms. A series of photogram projects followed, and in 1994 Godman was the winner of the Open Section of Agfa New Zealand Photokina Photography Award, and travelled to Germany to exhibit his photography. Photographs from this period are also part of the collection of the Te Papa museum.

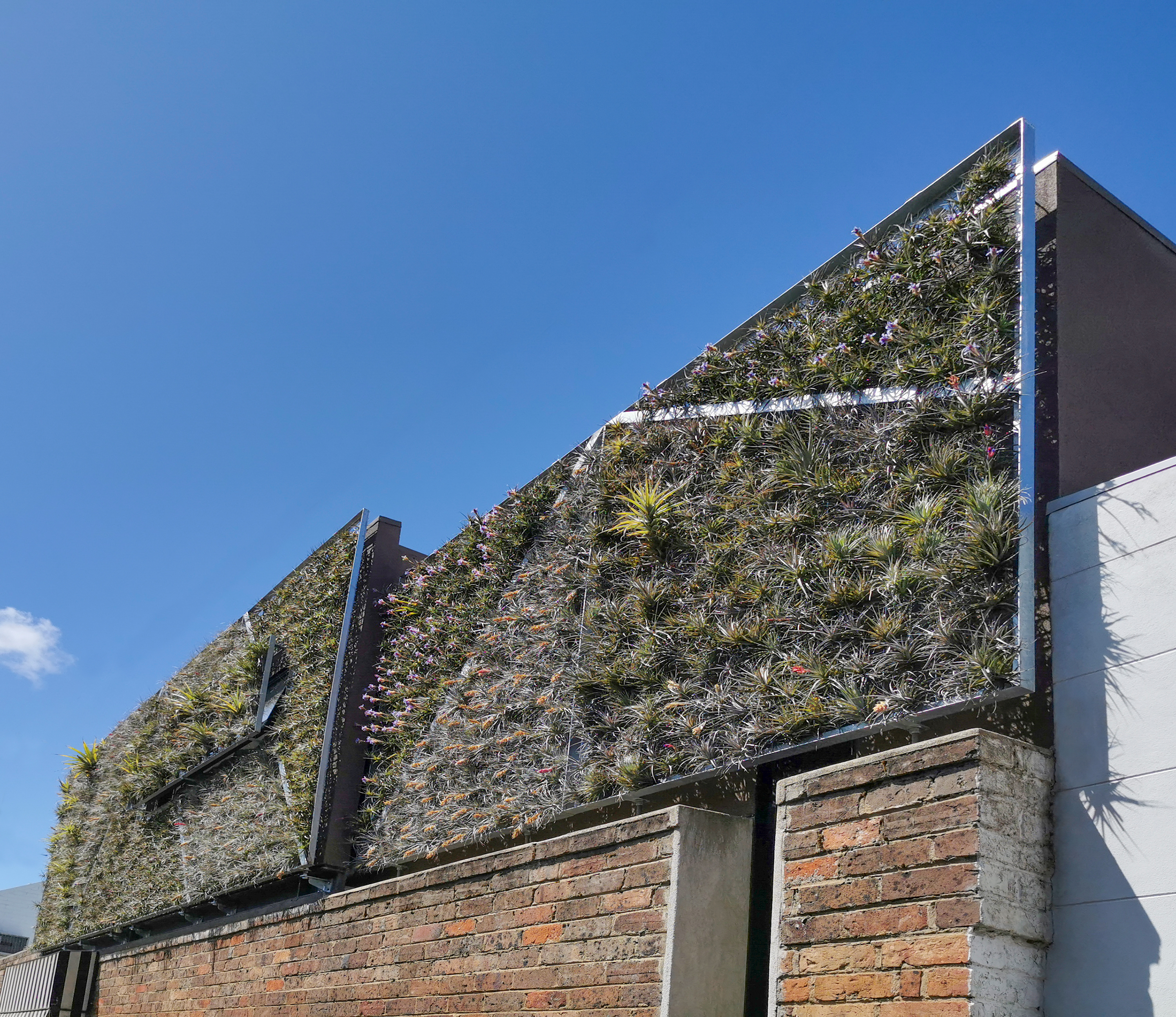
A green wall of tillandsia plants, by Lloyd Godman, East Melbourne

In 1996 he experimented with photosynthesis as a process to grow rudimentary images into the living tissue of Bromeliad leaves. From this time onwards, plants were also used for interactive gallery installations at the Temple Gallery in Dunedin, Burrinja Gallery in Melbourne, the Museum of Contemporary Art of Georgia in Atlanta USA, and at Deakin University Art Gallery in Melbourne, Australia. In 2008 Godman's photography was recognised in B&W Magazine, stating that "there couldn’t be in this part of the world a more protean, visionary and ecologically committed artist than Godman."

From 2010 Godman worked with Tillandsia plants as a living, self-sustaining, art medium by creating living sculptures and screens covered in these plants. Utilising a Media Free green wall system, he created plant experiments, sculptures, and permanent screens without any soil, water, or nutrient systems in more than fifty locations, including level 92 of Eureka Tower, the National Gallery of Victoria, Council House 2 and Montsalvat and TarraWarra Museum of Art. "In his own determined way for over thirty years, Godman has pondered and acted upon questions of how aesthetics might be involved in creating sustainable solutions to environmental problems."

== Awards and commissions ==
Godman’s plant sculptures received a Yering Station Sculpture Acknowledgement Award in 2005. His photographic work was a finalist in the 2010 National Photography Prize, Albury Art Gallery, Albury, NSW, Australia. In 2012 his work was a finalist in the Nillumbik Art Award, Victoria, Australia. In 2013 he received a City of Melbourne Arts Grant for his Airborne plant sculptures, and in 2022 he received a private commission to install a xeric green wall which uses more than three thousand Tillandsias.

== Collections ==
Godman’s work has been purchased for the collections of the Te Papa Museum, Wellington; Deakin University Gallery, Melbourne; Christchurch Gallery, Christchurch; Auckland Art Gallery, Auckland; Auckland Museum, Nillumbik Shire Council, Victoria, and is also held in private collections in U.S.A, France, Italy, Spain, England, Hungary, Russia, Poland, Portugal, Canada, and Germany, New Zealand and Australia.

== Residencies ==
Godman has undertaken environmental art residencies at New Zealand’s Auckland Island, and at L’Arbre de Vie, Chateau de Blacons, France, and at the Friends’ School, Hobart, Tasmania.

== Teaching ==
Alongside his career as an artist, Godman taught and ran the Photography section at the School of Art Otago Polytechnic for 20 years, taught photography at RMIT for 9 years, and was invited as a guest lecturer to the Sorbonne Paris North University, Paris, France, as well as the St Martins School of Art, London, England, and also offered photography workshops at the Baldessin Press in St Andrews, Victoria.
