= Deadman's Point Bridge =

Bridge in Cromwell, New Zealand

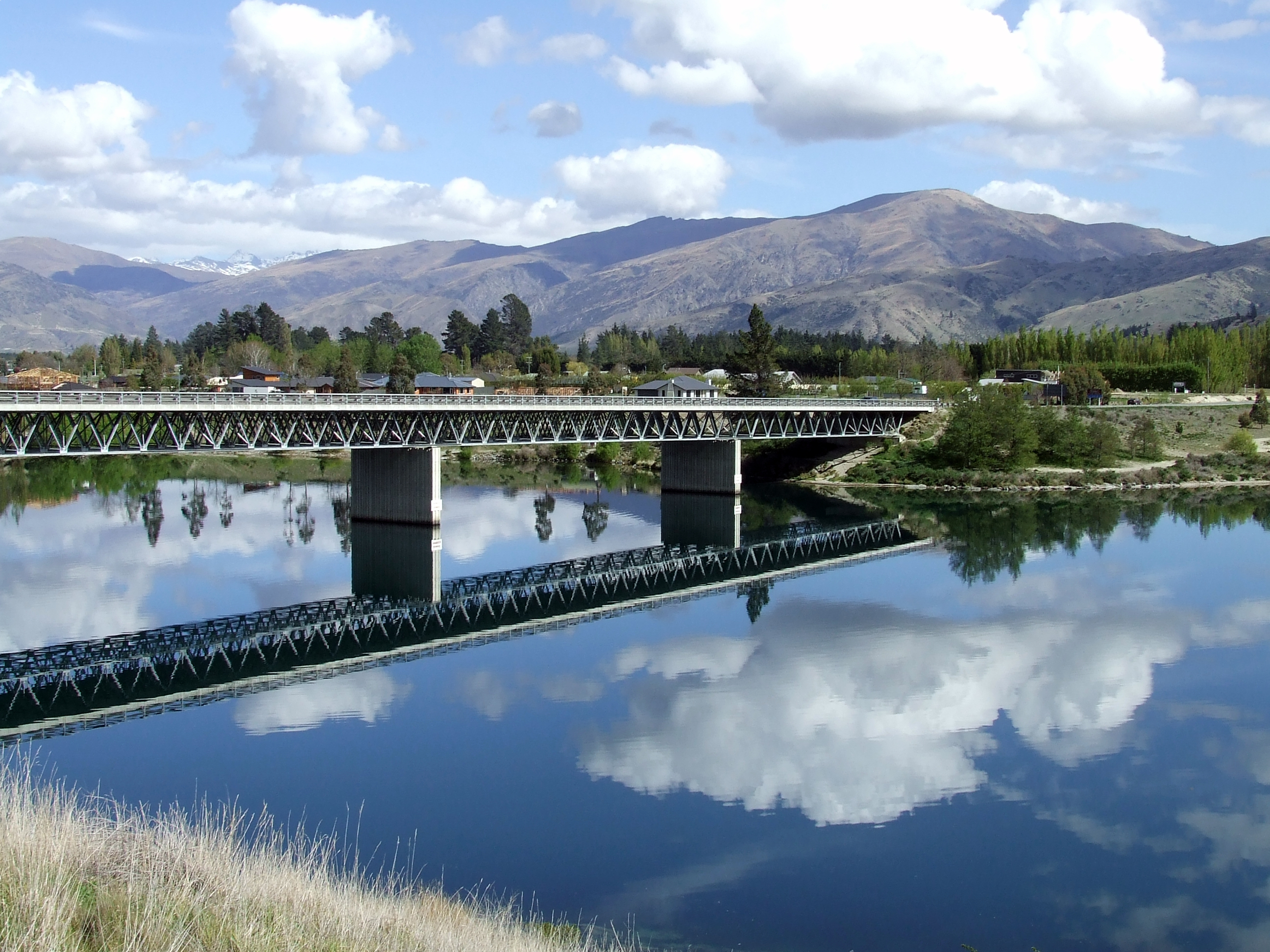
- Coordinates: 45°02′19″S 169°13′16″E
- Carries: 2 lanes of State Highway 8B
- Crosses: Lake Dunstan
- Owner: New Zealand Transport Agency
- Preceded by: Deadman's Point Footbridge

Characteristics
- Material: Steel
- Trough construction: concrete
- Total length: 272 metres (892 ft)
- Width: 12 metres (39 ft)
- Water depth: 35 metres (115 ft)
- Longest span: 40 metres (130 ft)
- Piers in water: 4
- Clearance below: 9 metres (30 ft) on true left of lake
- No. of lanes: 2

History
- Designer: Ministry of Works and Development
- Built: 1986
- Replaces: Cromwell Bridge

Location
- Interactive map of Deadman's Point Bridge

Deadman's Point Bridge crosses Lake Dunstan at Cromwell, Central Otago, as part of New Zealand's State Highway 8 (SH8). A short spur section, SH8B, joins SH8 on the true left bank of Lake Dunstan, crossing Deadman's Point Bridge to meet State Highway 6 immediately west of Cromwell.

== Background ==
=== Etymology ===
The origin of the name Deadman's Point appears uncertain, although an early account suggests the narrow headland of schist bedrock at Deadman's Point made the Clutha River (Māori: Mata-Au) a perilous crossing:

It is so-called because a man once fell from the suspension bridge which still spans the river there. He was found stiff and cold next morning, dead from heart failure. This grim story, and also the local legend that the bodies of the unfortunates who were drowned higher up the Clutha in the early days were invariably washed up at this point...

— Waipukurau Press, 28(173), 19 July 1933

=== Clyde Dam ===
Deadman's Point Bridge was built to replace Cromwell Bridge which was flooded in 1992–93 with the filling of Lake Dunstan. The Clyde Dam hydroelectric project caused the impoundment of the Clutha River at the mouth of the Cromwell Gorge near Clyde. With a head of 60 m (200 ft), the Cromwell Gorge and much of Cromwell's old town was flooded, necessitating a new highway through the gorge as well as a new bridge to cross Lake Dunstan.

Construction of Deadman's Point Bridge followed a lengthy debate on where the new bridge into Cromwell should be located. Numerous options were considered during the early design phases of the Clyde Dam, including a bridge at the same location as the old bridge (but higher), two bridges connecting Cornish Point, a bridge extending from Cromwell's Neplusultra Street, and the Deadman's Point location.

== Construction ==
The initial construction of Deadman's Point Bridge began in 1978 and continued until early 1982. The bridge is supported by four concrete piers, each 11 m (36 ft) wide, sunk into the schist bedrock either side of the (former) main Clutha River channel. Easton Industries (Napier) Ltd were charged with fabrication of the bridge's steel trusses, approximately 550 tonnes worth, having won a tender for 288,874 NZD in 1978. The total cost of Deadman's Point Bridge was 2.4 million NZD in 1984.

Given the slope instability noted during the construction of the Clyde Dam and the potential for earthquake-induced damage, the piers of Deadman's Point Bridge were fitted with rocking isolation hinges which allow the bridge piers to uplift and pivot during earthquake excitation. The bridge's design focuses on diminishing the structural deformation and damage caused during a seismic event.

Associated with the construction of Deadman's Point Bridge was road realignment and completion of State Highway SH8B. Re-sealing of this portion of road was completed in 1985.

== Associated development ==
With consented and projected residential development occurring on both sides of SH8B, this portion of road will eventually become an urban through-route. It is anticipated that the speed limit will be 50 km/h (31 mph), perhaps lower, for the overall distance between Deadman's Point Bridge and SH6.
