= Horatio Hartley =

American gold prospector (1826–1903)

- Born: 1826; Ohio, United States
- Died: 21 January 1903 (aged 77); Olympia, Washington, United States
- Burial place: Odd Fellows Memorial Park, Tumwater, Washington, United States
- Occupations: Gold miner, prospector
- Years active: 1849–1869
- Known for: Discovery of exceptional gold riches with his partner Christopher Reilly
- Spouse: Mary Ann Griffin

Horatio Hartley (1826–1903) was an American gold prospector who participated in the Otago gold rush in New Zealand in the 1860s.

In 1862, Hartley discovered gold near Clutha River with Christopher Reilly. The location was proclaimed as the Dunstan goldfield on 23 September 1862.

== Early life ==
Horatio Hartley was born in Ohio, United States, in 1826. Little has been recorded of his early life until he joined the gold rush to California in 1849. At this point, Hartley was 22 years old and it was in the goldfields of California he would befriend Christopher Reilly, a gold prospector from Ireland.

== Gold rushes ==
As much of his early life, Hartley's life during the California gold rush is equally poorly recorded. What is known is that both Hartley and Reilly followed the gold rush from California to the Victorian goldfields in Australia. Departing Victoria and travelling from Sydney to Auckland, the pair arrived in New Zealand in 1862.

=== New Zealand ===
Like many Victorian miners, Hartley and Reilly congregated at the Tuapeka goldfield (Lawrence) on the Clutha River (Māori: Mata-Au), although it is likely their past experience in California and Victoria drove them to search for gold in Central Otago's interior.

The winter of 1862 was exceptionally severe and resulted in unseasonably low-levels of the Clutha River. Hartley and Reilly worked the sides of the Cromwell Gorge for three months until they were forced to take the huge hoard of gold they had secretly amassed to the Chief Gold Receiver in Dunedin in August 1862. Hartley and Reilly's discovery caused great excitement as they deposited some 87 lb (1,044 t oz) of gold, sparking a gold rush to what would become known as Hartley's Beach. Hartley and Reilly, in divulging the location of their rich finds (approximately one mile downstream of the confluence with the Kawarau River), were rewarded with £2000 from the Otago Provincial Government. On 23 September 1862 the Dunstan goldfield was proclaimed, the selection of this name in preference to Hartley's being largely in deference to Reilly, who was 'jealous of the pre-eminence' accorded Hartley as the discoverer.

Immediately after the discovery, Hartley announced his intention to visit the Coromandel goldfields. Hartley assessed (and purchased into several claims) in the Coromandel goldfields on behalf of Otago miners, expressing that he had never seen anything better in quartz countries. Returning to Dunedin in February 1863, he would leave again on 18 March from Queenstown for the West Coast via the Dart River. On reaching the Awarau River, he was forced to turn back due to a shortage of provisions.

== Later life ==
Hartley's movements are uncertain following his return to Queenstown in March 1863. He appears to have led a prospecting party from Melbourne to New Guinea in the late 1860s or early 1870s.

Hartley returned to the United States and married Mary Ann Griffin (born 1828 in Vermont) in 1869, the couple settling in Olympia, Washington. Not forgetting his success in Central Otago thirty years prior, Hartley wrote to the Otago Daily Times in December 1893 requesting a subscription to the Otago Witness:

I was in New Zealand about 30 years ago. You may remember Hartley and Reilly, prospectors, who made quite a little stir in Dunedin for a few weeks.

Yours, H. Hartley

— Otago Daily Times, 20 December 1893,

Hartley's gold prospecting had earned him some considerable wealth and he subsequently owned a significant amount of property in Olympia, including a large ranch, but he would eventually become known as an eccentric.

In failing health for some time, Horatio Hartley died on 21 January 1903 in Gull Harbor, Washington. He was buried in the Odd Fellows Memorial Park in Thurston County near Olympia. Though his wife survived him, having no children, Hartley bequeathed the majority of his estate (US$30,000) to the Olympia School District and just US$2000 plus US$600 a year to Mary Ann, so long as she did not remarry.

Mary Ann died on 6 February 1915 and was buried alongside him.

== Legacy ==
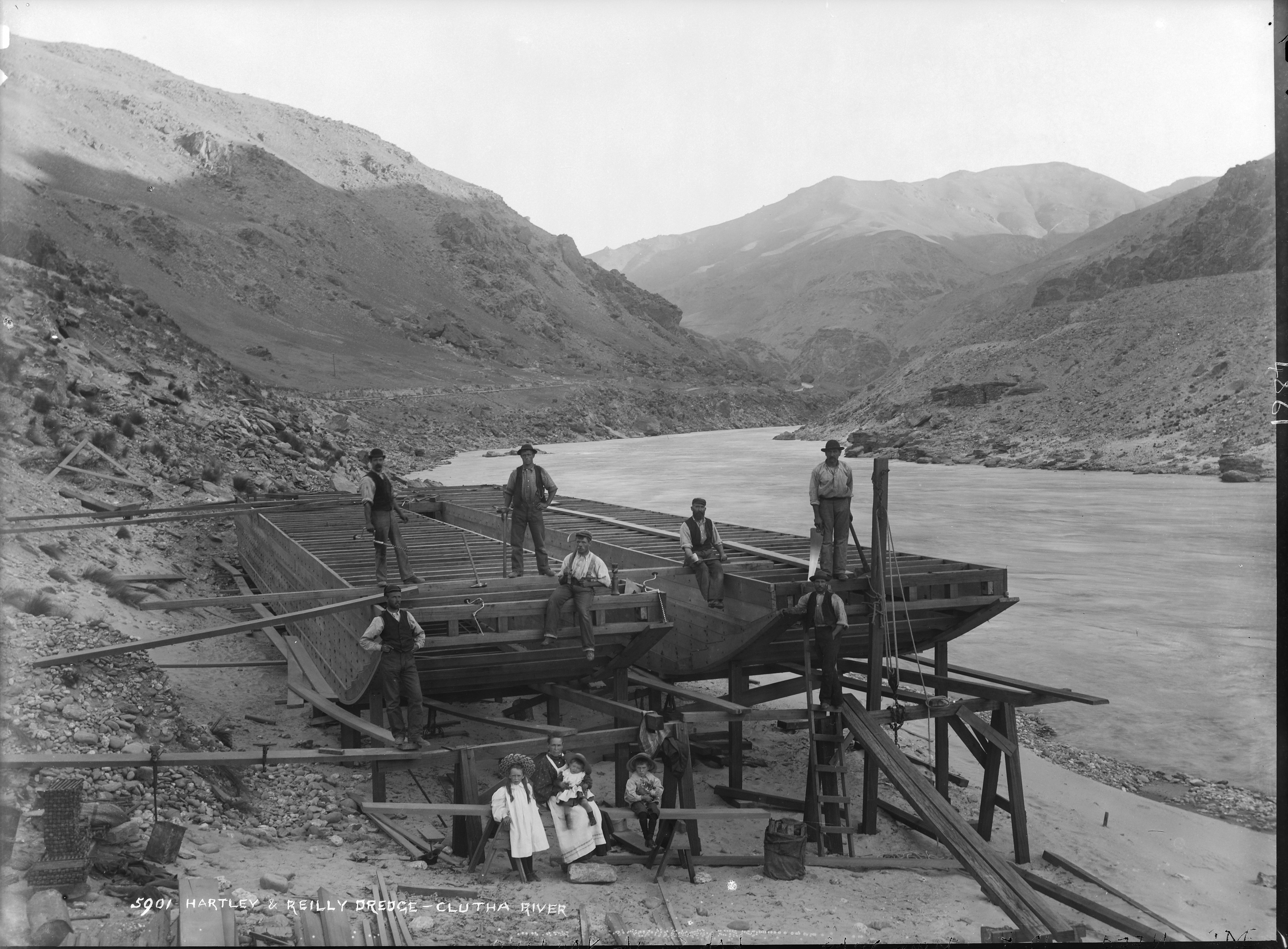
Construction of the Hartley and Reilly Dredge next to the Clutha River in the Cromwell Gorge, 1890s

Their names synonymous with the discovery of gold in the Cromwell Gorge, it was perhaps inevitable that with the introduction of gold dredges on the Clutha River in the 1890s that one would carry the eponym of Hartley and Reilly. The Hartley and Reilly Dredge had mixed success; it was mining Hartley's Beach when a drunken dredge-hand let the ladder down out of control crashing through a hard pan into an underlying layer richer in gold than Hartley and Reilly's original discovery. In a single week the dredge recovered £5000 worth of gold. Unfortunately, the Hartley and Reilly dredging company went into liquidation in 1913, and the dredge was sold at auction. It sank in 1914.

Horatio Hartley and Christopher Reilly are remembered on a plaque (45.063280°S 169.217262°E) in the Cromwell Gorge which was installed by the Otago Goldfields Heritage Trust. The plaque overlooks Hartley's Beach (now submerged beneath Lake Dunstan) and reads:

Beginning of Dunstan Goldfield 1862

"Our object was to work only the richest spots, as we did not know how soon we might be discovered and rushed. We did not wash anything unless we thought it would pay about a pound weight a day – that is six ounces each"
– Horatio Hartley & Christopher Reilly, August 1862

In this vicinity Hartley and Reilly found 87 lb (39.5 kg) of gold in only two months during the winter of 1862. Their find proved the richness of the gold deposits in the area and the rush to the Dunstan began.

While the river remained low gold yield was high. However, with spring the river rose and the miners moved further afield searching for gold. They went to Manuherikia, Bannockburn, Nevis, Bendigo, the Shotover and the Arrow, opening up the vast interior of Otago.
