= Christopher Reilly =

Irish gold prospector

- Born: Dublin, Ireland
- Died: 1887; Dublin, Ireland
- Other name: Christopher Riley
- Occupations: Gold miner, prospector
- Years active: 1849–1873
- Known for: Discovery of exceptional gold riches with his partner Horatio Hartley

Christopher Reilly (sometimes spelt Riley) was an Irish gold prospector who participated in the Otago gold rush in New Zealand in the 1860s.

In 1862, Reilly discovered gold on the Clutha River with Horatio Hartley. The location was proclaimed as the Dunstan goldfield on 23 September 1862.

== Early life ==
Christopher Reilly is thought to have been born in Dublin, Ireland, though this and many of the details of his early life remain vague and contradictory. Little has been recorded of his early life apart from the fact he may have attended the University of Dublin, later joining the gold rush to California in 1849. Here in the Barbary Coast goldfields of California he would befriend Horatio Hartley, a gold prospector from Ohio in the United States.

== Gold rushes ==
Consistent with much of his early life, Reilly's life during the California gold rush is equally poorly recorded. What is known is that both Reilly and Hartley followed the gold rush from California to the Victorian Goldfields in Australia. Departing Victoria and travelling from Sydney to Auckland, the pair arrived in New Zealand in 1862.

=== New Zealand ===
Like many Victorian miners, Hartley and Reilly congregated at the Tuapeka goldfield (Lawrence) on the Clutha River (Māori: Mata-Au), although it is likely their past experience in California and Victoria drove them to search for gold in Central Otago's poorly-explored interior.

The winter of 1862 was exceptionally severe and resulted in unseasonably low-levels of the Clutha River. Hartley and Reilly worked the sides on the Cromwell Gorge for three months until they were forced to take the huge hoard of gold they had secretly amassed to the Chief Gold Receiver in Dunedin in August 1862. Hartley and Reilly's discovery caused great excitement as they deposited some 87 lb (1,044 t oz) of gold, sparking a gold rush to what would become known as Hartley's Beach. Hartley and Reilly, in divulging the location of their rich finds (approximately one mile downstream of the confluence with the Kawarau River), were rewarded with £2000 from the Otago Provincial Government. On 23 September 1862 the Dunstan goldfield was proclaimed, the selection of this name in preference to Hartley's being largely in deference to Reilly, who was 'jealous of the pre-eminence' accorded Hartley as the discoverer.

Neither Reilly or Hartley remained very long to participate in the fevered gold rush into Central Otago's interior. Reilly's imagination had been captured by the notion of a deep-sea harbour at Port Molyneux, at the mouth of the Clutha River, to serve the goldmining industry. Abandoning a claim in the Dunstan Goldfield in October 1862, he led an expedition of 18 men and two lifeboats to prove the Clutha River was "nature’s highway to the Dunstan". Reilly's testimony of his feat received wide praise, described as "not less meritorious than that of his discovery of the field – although it has received no recognition". Reilly later admitted the expedition proved that the Clutha was "wholly unnavigable". The venture cost Reilly on the order of £600 and he asked the Otago Provincial Council for compensation for leading the expedition. The Provincial Council eventually decided not to recommend any compensation, but by this time Reilly had left New Zealand for Australia. He was reported in Tasmania in January 1863, where the Government wished to secure the services of Reilly to find a payable gold field. With a handsome reward on offer, but the Government having no funds with which to engage Reilly, he declined this offer and took leave of Tasmania.

== Later life ==
Reilly's movements after his brief period of fame in Central Otago become more uncertain from this point forward. He appeared in Nelson's Colonist newspaper on 31 January 1873 where he was reported to be back in Dunedin, having "done" both America and Australia. Reilly considered New Zealand to be:

... a far better country for an enterprising colonist than any part of the world he had visited, and that rich goldfields, yet to be worked, exist in it.

— Christopher Reilly, The Colonist, XVI:1603

Reilly intended to give practical proof of this faith by starting on a prospecting tour. However, little mention is made of him after this.

It is thought that he returned to his native Dublin and died there in 1887, although a conflicting account suggests he instead died a poor man in Australia.

== Legacy ==
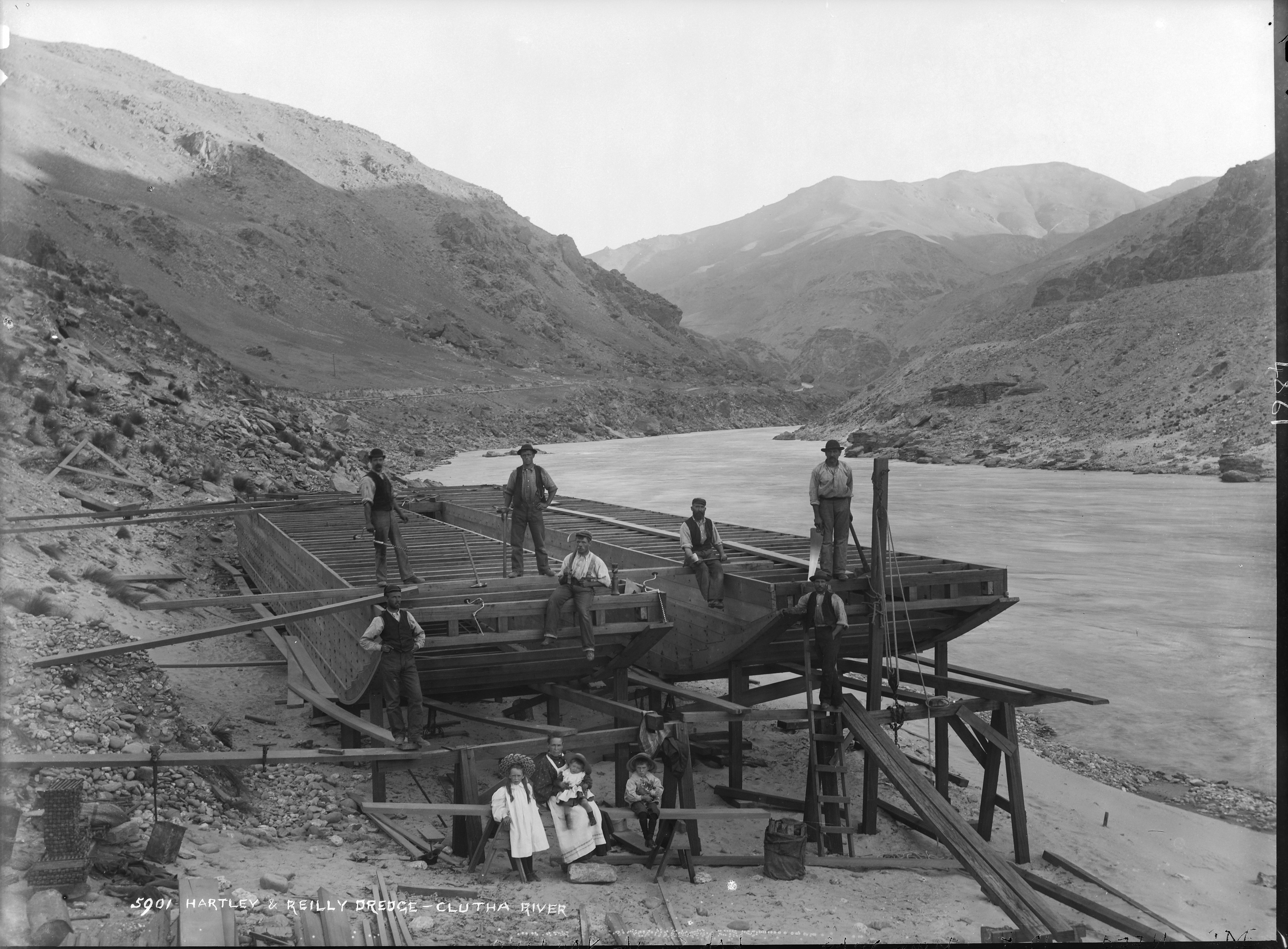
Construction of the Hartley and Reilly Dredge next to the Clutha River in the Cromwell Gorge, 1890s

Their names synonymous with the discovery of gold in the Cromwell Gorge, it was perhaps inevitable that with the introduction of gold dredges on the Clutha River in the 1890s that one would carry the eponym of Hartley and Reilly. The Hartley and Reilly Dredge had mixed success; it was mining Hartley's Beach when a drunken dredge-hand let the ladder down out of control crashing through a hard pan into an underlying layer richer in gold than Hartley and Reilly's original discovery. In a single week the dredge recovered £5000 worth of gold. Unfortunately, the Hartley and Reilly dredging company went into liquidation in 1913, and the dredge was sold at auction. It sank in 1914.

Horatio Hartley and Christopher Reilly are remembered on a plaque (45.063280°S 169.217262°E) in the Cromwell Gorge which was installed by the Otago Goldfields Heritage Trust. The plaque overlooks Hartley's Beach (now submerged beneath Lake Dunstan) and reads:

Beginning of Dunstan Goldfield 1862

"Our object was to work only the richest spots, as we did not know how soon we might be discovered and rushed. We did not wash anything unless we thought it would pay about a pound weight a day – that is six ounces each"
– Horatio Hartley & Christopher Reilly, August 1862

In this vicinity Hartley and Reilly found 87 lb (39.5 kg) of gold in only two months during the winter of 1862. Their find proved the richness of the gold deposits in the area and the rush to the Dunstan began.

While the river remained low gold yield was high. However, with spring the river rose and the miners moved further afield searching for gold. They went to Manuherikia, Bannockburn, Nevis, Bendigo, the Shotover and the Arrow, opening up the vast interior of Otago.
