= Lowburn =

- Location within New Zealand
- Coordinates: 45°0′S 169°12′E
- Country: New Zealand
- Region: Otago
- Territorial authority: Central Otago District

Lowburn is a small settlement in Central Otago, in the South Island of New Zealand. It is located close to the shores of the man-made Lake Dunstan, which was formed by the building of the Clyde Dam. Lowburn lies between the towns of Wānaka and Cromwell.

In the early days of European settlement, a ferry crossed the Clutha River at this point. The modern economy of the settlement is largely based on orcharding and livestock, though wine production is also becoming important to the area.
