= Rangitata orogeny =

The Rangitata orogeny (an orogeny named after the Rangitata River), was a long period of uplift and collision in New Zealand.

200 million years ago, sedimentary strata were being pushed along the sea floor as the result of seafloor spreading. The moving rocks were being pushed towards a gap in the crust or subduction zone. However, when the rocks reached this zone, the wet sediments were too buoyant to follow the heavier ones through the subduction zone. Instead of this the strata were scraped off the crust and squeezed against sediments in the volcanic sea to the west. This collision lasted for 50 million years.

However, the wet sediments could not just keep piling up. After 50 million years, there was simply too much rock and a 'log jam' in the process was formed. The rocks were squeezed together as they broke and crumpled up. As the compression intensified, the strata were slowly pushed up, creating new land.

The collision was also causing a great thickening of the crust, pushing the rocks down into the top of the mantle. The high pressures and temperatures of this occurrence metamorphosed the lower rocks into the Haast Schists.
