= Clyde Dam =

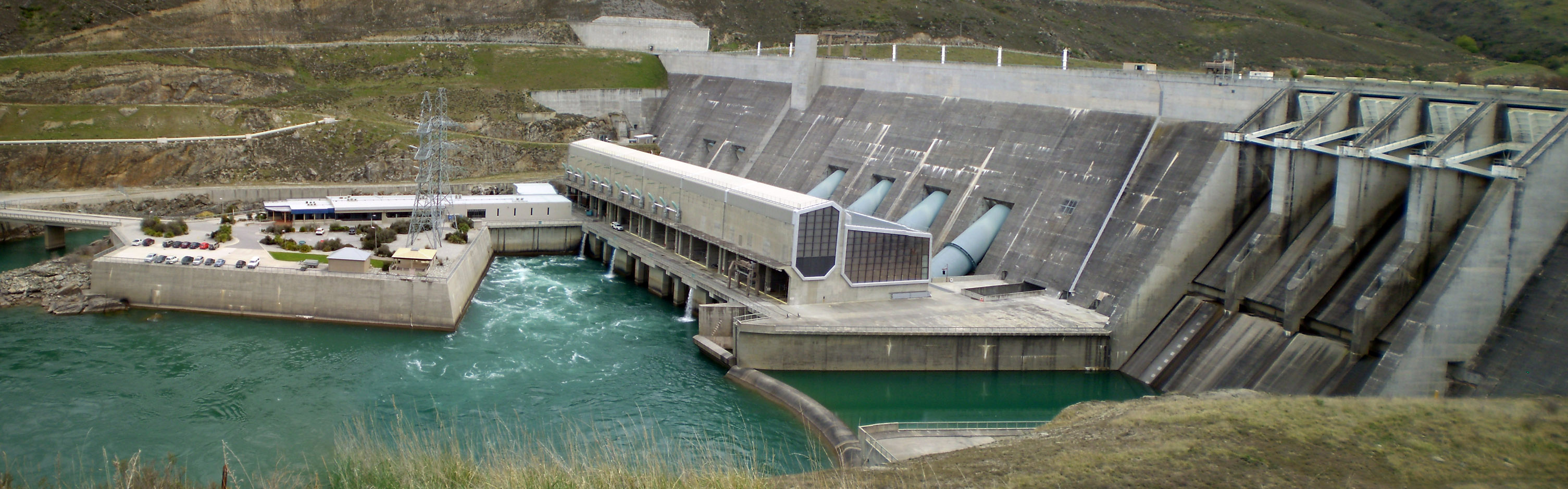
- Clyde Dam from the east, looking west

- Location within New Zealand
- Location: Clyde, Otago, New Zealand
- Coordinates: 45.179314°S 169.306955°E

Dam and spillways
- Type of dam: Concrete gravity dam
- Impounds: Clutha River
- Height: 100 m (330 ft)
- Length: 490 m (1,610 ft)
- Width (crest): 10 m (33 ft)
- Width (base): 70 m (230 ft)

Reservoir
- Creates: Lake Dunstan
- Surface area: 26 km^{2} (10 sq mi)

Power Station
- Operator: Contact Energy
- Commission date: 1992
- Turbines: 4× 108 MW (145,000 hp) Francis turbines
- Installed capacity: 464 MW
- Annual generation: 2,100 GWh

The Clyde Dam, is New Zealand's third-largest (by generating capacity) hydroelectric dam (Note: List of power stations in New Zealand). It is located on the Clutha River / Mata-Au near the town of Clyde. It is owned and operated by Contact Energy.

== History ==
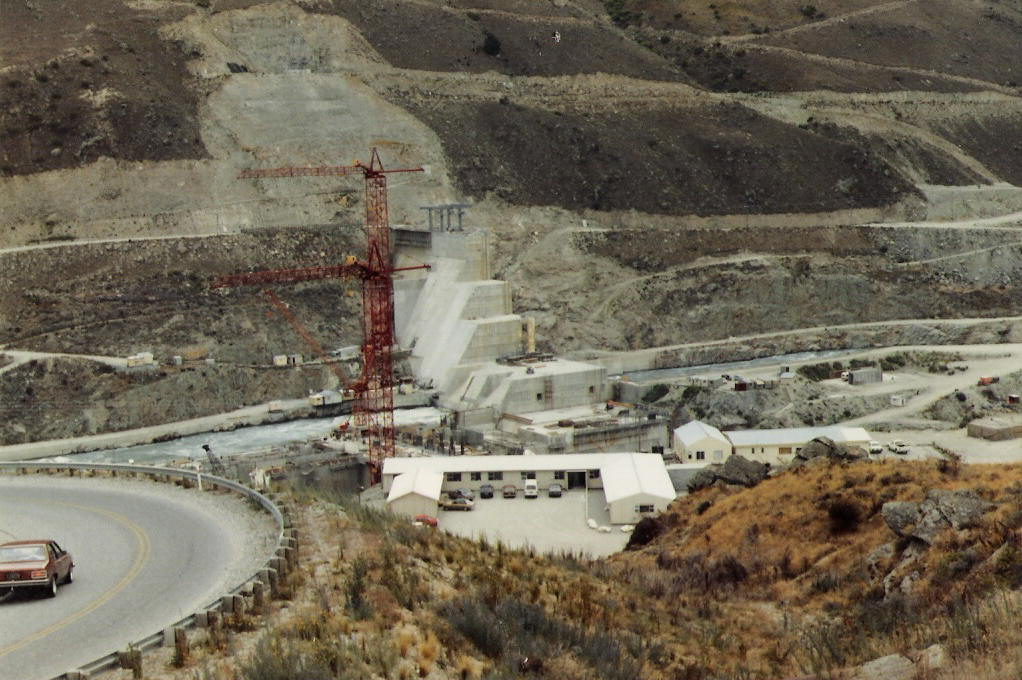
Clyde Dam under construction circa 1986

There was considerable controversy when the dam was planned because it would flood many houses and orchards upstream at Cromwell, as well as the scenic Cromwell Gorge, which was a highlight of the then young but growing New Zealand tourism industry. Construction also required replacement of a stretch of highway and the closure of the Otago Central Railway beyond Clyde, though materials for the dam would provide significant traffic for the rest of the line which was experiencing a drop in freight tonnage. To mitigate these problems, the Kirk Labour government decided a low dam should be built at Clyde. This decision was overturned by the following National government, who preferred a high dam.

There was also debate about whether the dam was needed. National's support for a controversial aluminium smelter at Aramoana, another of Prime Minister Sir Robert Muldoon's Think Big projects of the late 1970s and early 1980s, was one justification propounded for the dam. An initial grant of water rights for the dam was overturned by the High Court following an appeal by landowners. National overturned this decision, after bargaining for the support of Social Credit (who had initially opposed a high dam), in the Clutha Development (Clyde Dam) Empowering Act 1982. The Act was later repealed by the following National government on 1 October 1991, when it was superseded by the Resource Management Act 1991.

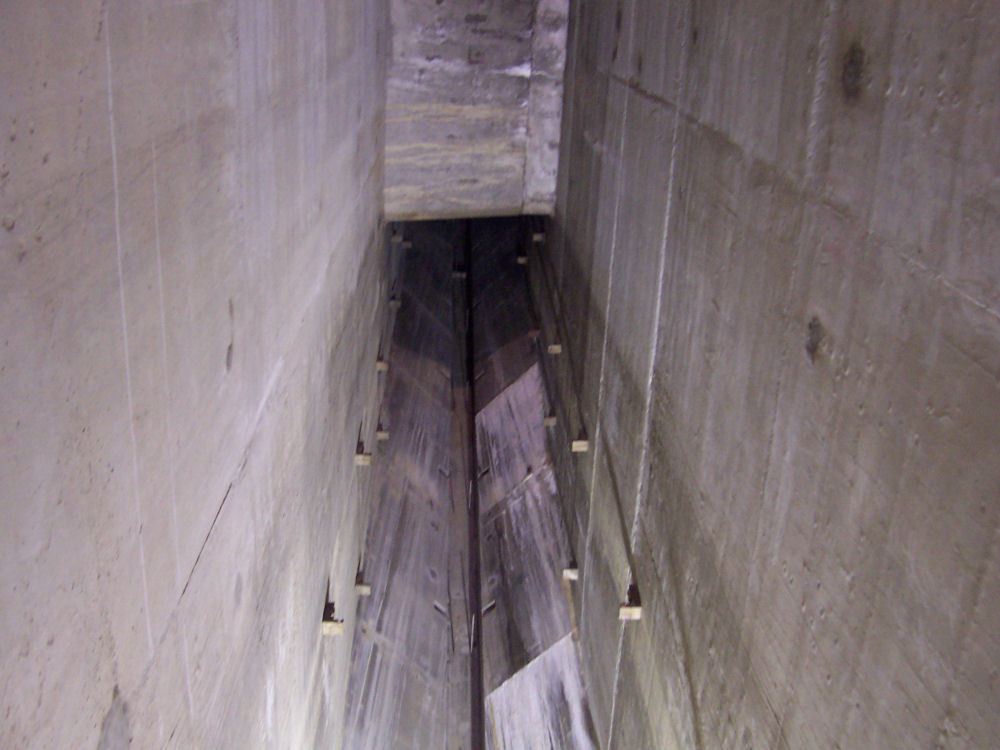
Expansion joint

The dam was constructed between 1982 and 1993. Filling it was done in four controlled stages beginning in April 1992, and completed the following year, creating Lake Dunstan. The power station has a capacity of four 120 MVA (116 MW) Francis turbines (for a total of 464 MW), but was only allowed to run 432 MW due to resource consent conditions. The dam was built with two additional penstocks, allowing additional turbines to be installed in future. The resource consent was changed in 2005 to allow the full 464 MW to be produced.

During construction, the adjacent rock was discovered to be microfractured, because of an earthquake fault running underneath the dam site. The dam was redesigned, losing a sluice channel and cutting its generation capacity from 612 MW to 464 MW. A slip joint was built into the dam to accommodate 1–2 metres of potential ground movement, and a large amount of slurry cement was pumped into the rock to stop water leaks. This additional work was one reason for a major project cost overrun, which made the dam the most expensive in New Zealand. The other areas of overrun were due to stabilisation of landslides in the Cromwell Gorge. There are over 18 km of tunnels throughout the gorge for draining purposes. Because of all this extra work it overran the budget by nearly an extra 50% and delayed the filling of Lake Dunstan by a few years.

Maintenance workers accidentally activated fire alarms in the dam on 15 December 2008. The alarms triggered the release of a large bank of CO_{2} cylinders at the generators, flooding the equipment with the gas. Extractor fans to clear the CO_{2} then activated, and firefighters with breathing apparatus and gas detectors checked through the dam to ensure it had cleared.

== Gallery ==
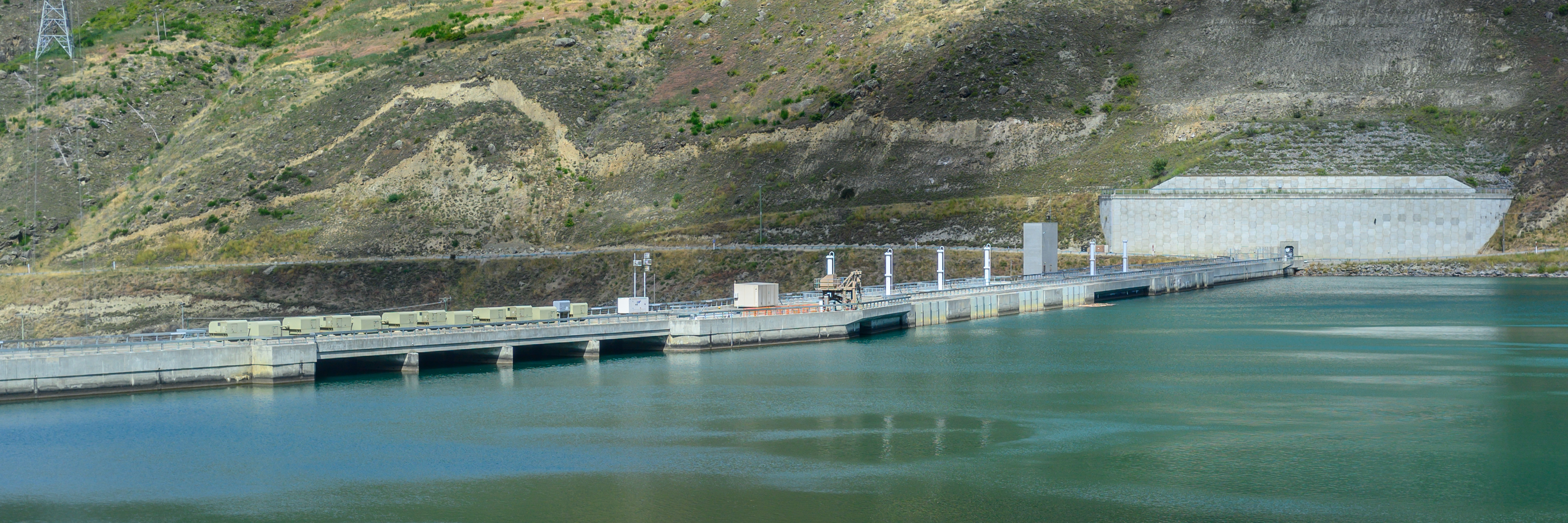

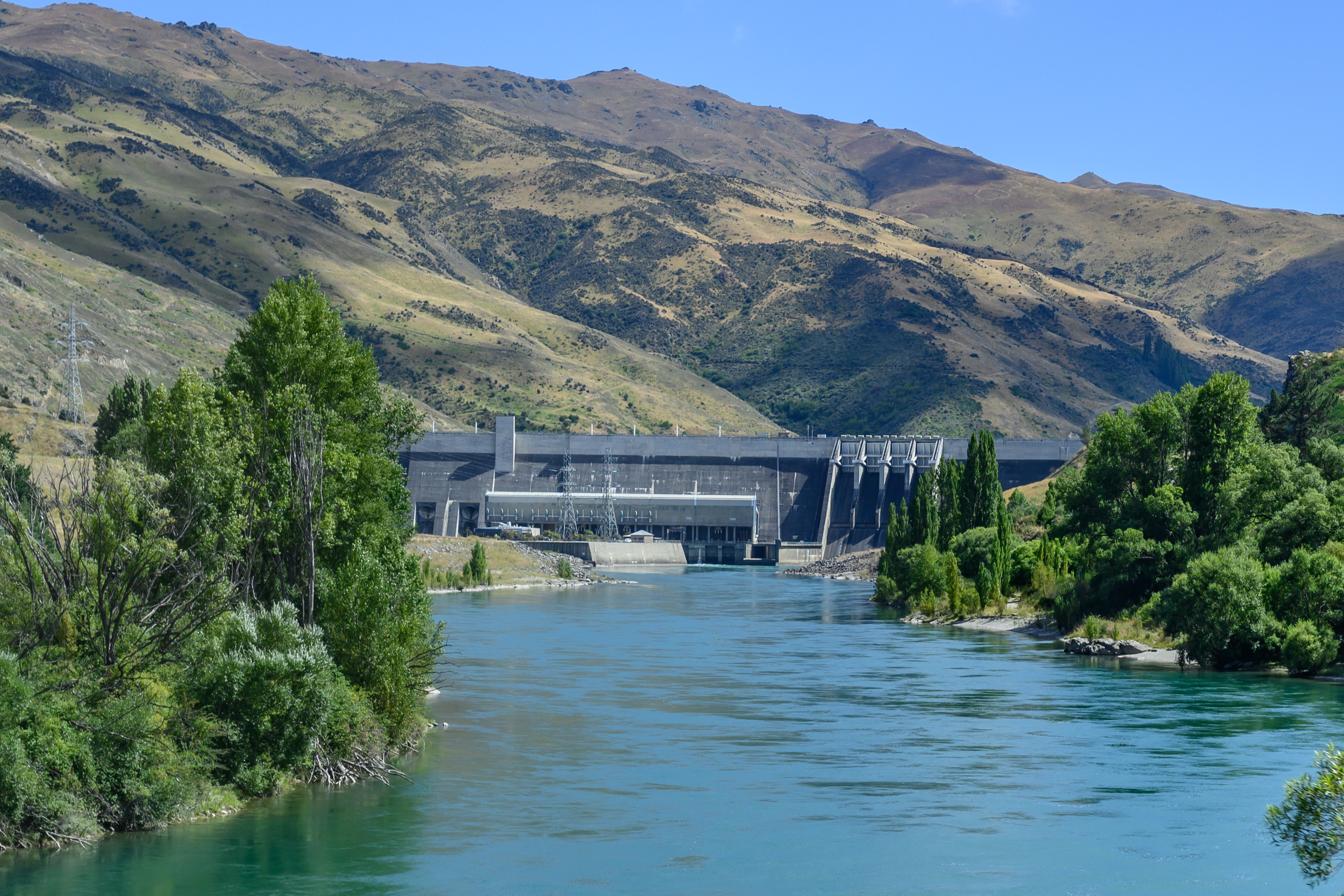

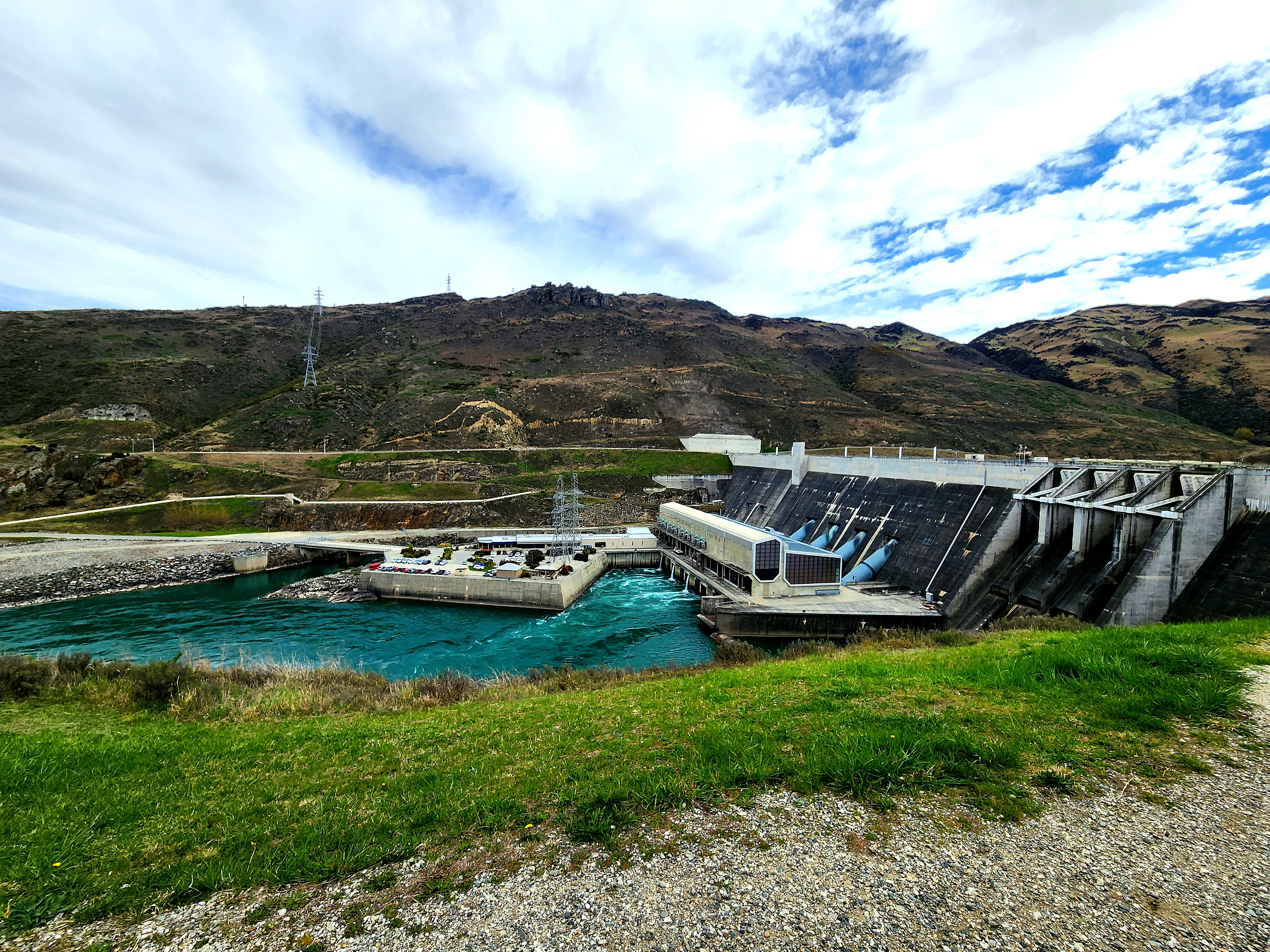

== Trivia ==
The Clyde Dam, while still under construction, was used for on-location filming in the 1985 movie Shaker Run.

== See also ==
- Hydroelectric power in New Zealand
- List of power stations in New Zealand
- Electricity sector in New Zealand
