= Lake Dunstan =

Artificial lake in Otago, New Zealand

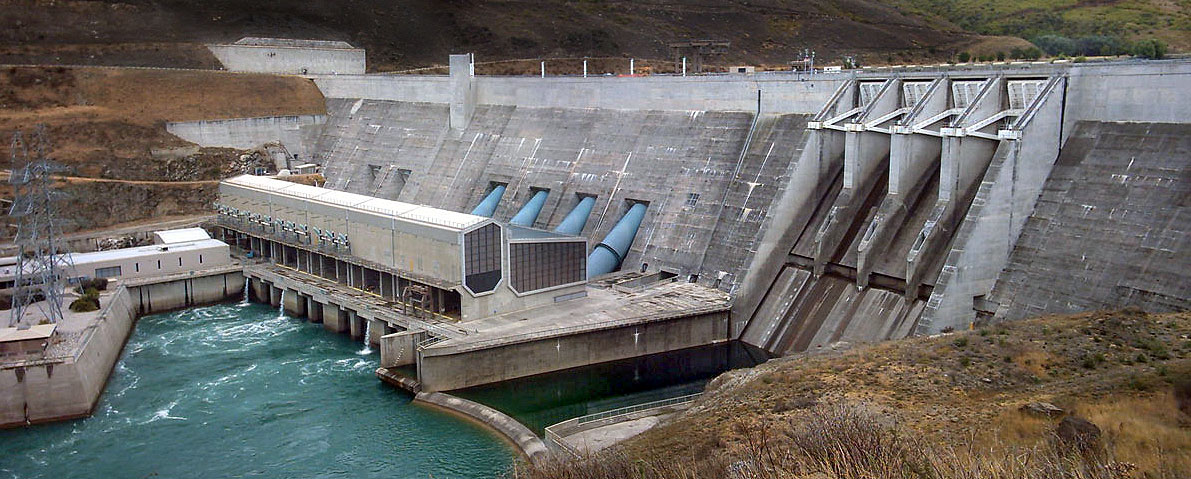
- The Clyde Dam

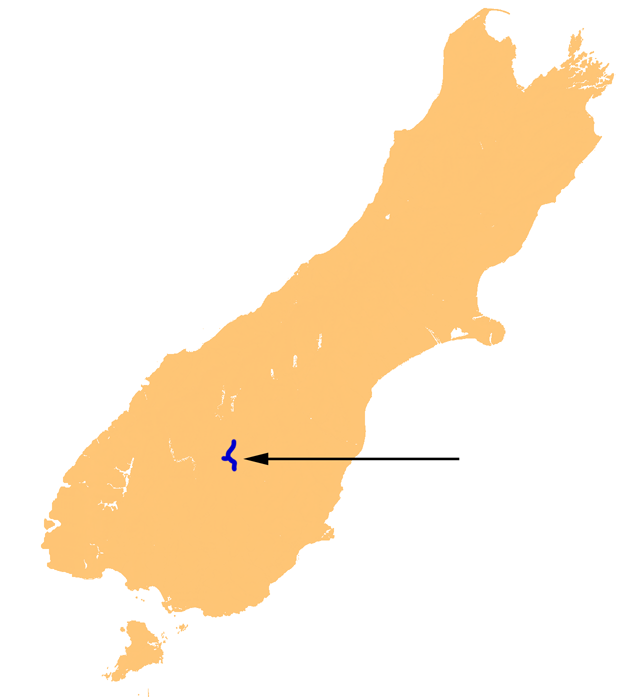
- Lake Dunstan

- Location within South Island
- Location: Central Otago District, Otago Region, South Island
- Coordinates: 45.022°S 169.218°E
- Lake type: reservoir
- Primary inflows: Clutha River
- Primary outflows: Clutha River
- Basin countries: New Zealand
- Surface area: 26 km^{2} (10 sq mi)

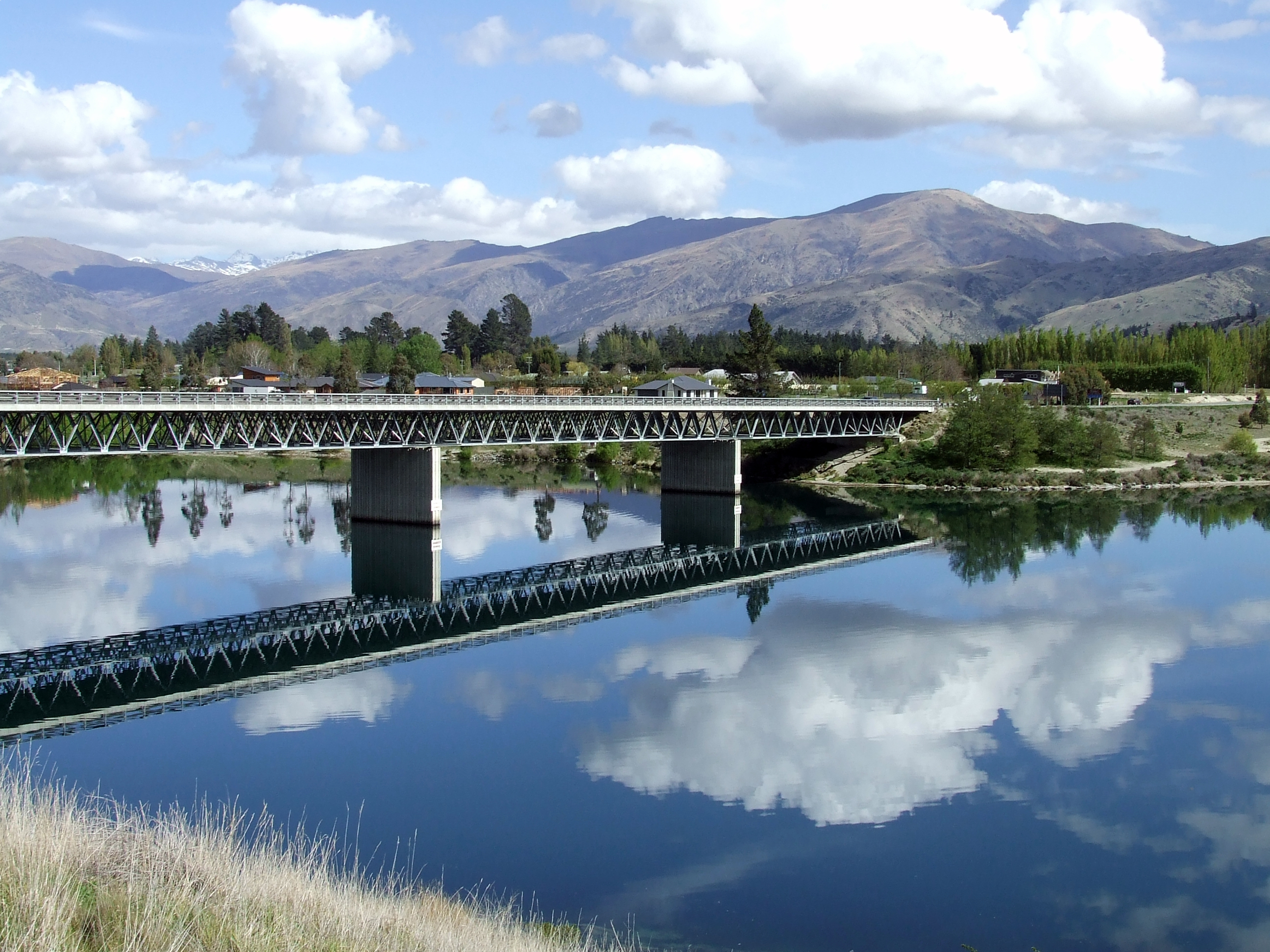
Deadmans Point bridge, crossing a narrow section of Lake Dunstan near Cromwell.

Lake Dunstan is a man-made lake and reservoir in the Otago Region of the South Island of New Zealand.

The lake was formed on the Clutha River as a result of the construction of the Clyde Dam, filling in four controlled stages beginning in April 1992 and completed the next year. Parts of the town of Cromwell were relocated to a new area above the new lake. Between the town of Cromwell and the Clyde Dam the lake passes through what is called the Cromwell Gorge.

Lake Dunstan provides irrigation for nearby stone fruit orchards and vineyards, and is a major recreational asset, with facilities for boating, waterskiing, fishing, parapenting, and rowing.

The dam and lake became well known in New Zealand due to media coverage of the geological problems during its construction. While the dam was being built at least one landslide occurred at Cairnmuir, a series of bluffs overlooking the gorge where the dam was built. All parties involved denied responsibility for not finding the problem.

Because of the expense of stabilising the gorge walls and the changing economic climate, this was also the last of the Third National Government's Think Big projects.

== Protests ==
There was vocal protest against the project from the local community, with calls for the planning and project to cease. Environmentalists, scientists, lawyers, recreational river users, families that had lived here for generations, and others that had recently moved to the area protested, none seemingly more poignantly than the artists.

There was a perception that the power from the dam was intended for an aluminium smelter near Dunedin. Prominent figures including Ralph Hotere, Andrew Drummond, Chris Cree Brown and Chris Booth did significant and powerful work that related to the smelter issue, gaining publicity and acclaim with exhibitions and appropriate comment in various art magazines. Other artists worked on the dam issue: Robin Morrison created a sensitive series of portraits on the residents affected by the flooding; Marilynn Webb a compelling series of prints called "Good Bye- Clutha Blue" in 1983; Bruce Foster a series of Ciba-chrome prints investigating the pre-construction lines painted on the land, and Lloyd Godman a significant series of large photo-mural prints, toned with gold from the Clutha River, entitled “The Last River's Song”. During the filling of the dam to form Lake Dunstan in 1992–93, Godman also completed a series of performance works entitled "Lake Fill", which involved using an underwater camera to take a series of photographs of a selected vista up the river showing its gradual obliteration due to the rising lake level.
