= Lake Hāwea =

Lake in Otago Region, New Zealand

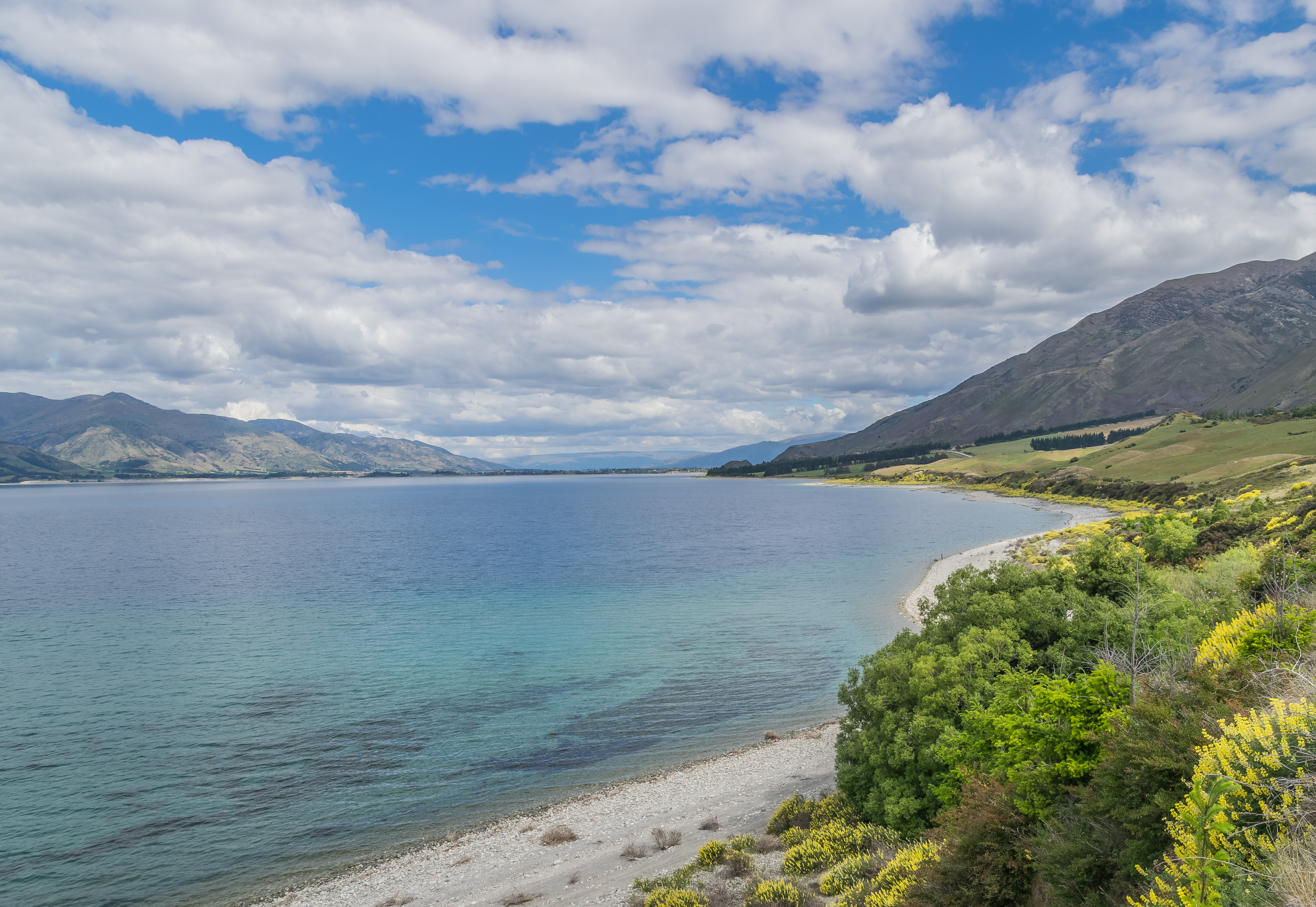
- Lake Hāwea, looking south

- Location within New Zealand Location within South Island
- Interactive map of Lake Hāwea
- Location: Queenstown-Lakes District, Otago Region, South Island
- Coordinates: 44°30′S 169°17′E
- Primary inflows: Hunter River
- Primary outflows: Hāwea River
- Basin countries: New Zealand
- Max. length: 35 km (22 mi)
- Surface area: 151.7 km^{2} (58.6 sq mi)
- Average depth: ~ 161 m (528 ft)
- Max. depth: 392 m (1,286 ft)
- Water volume: 24.49 km^{3} (5.88 cu mi)
- Surface elevation: 348 m (1,142 ft)
- Islands: Silver Island

Lake Hāwea is New Zealand's ninth largest lake located in the South Island's Otago Region at an altitude of 348 m. It covers approximately 151 km^{2} and is 392 m deep.

Lake Hāwea is named after a Māori tribe who preceded the Waitaha people in the area.

Lake Hāwea stretches 35 km from north to south. It lies in a glacial valley formed during the last ice age, and is fed by the Hunter River. Nearby Lake Wānaka lies in a parallel glacial valley 8 km to the west. At their closest point, a rocky ridge called The Neck, the lakes are only 1 km apart.

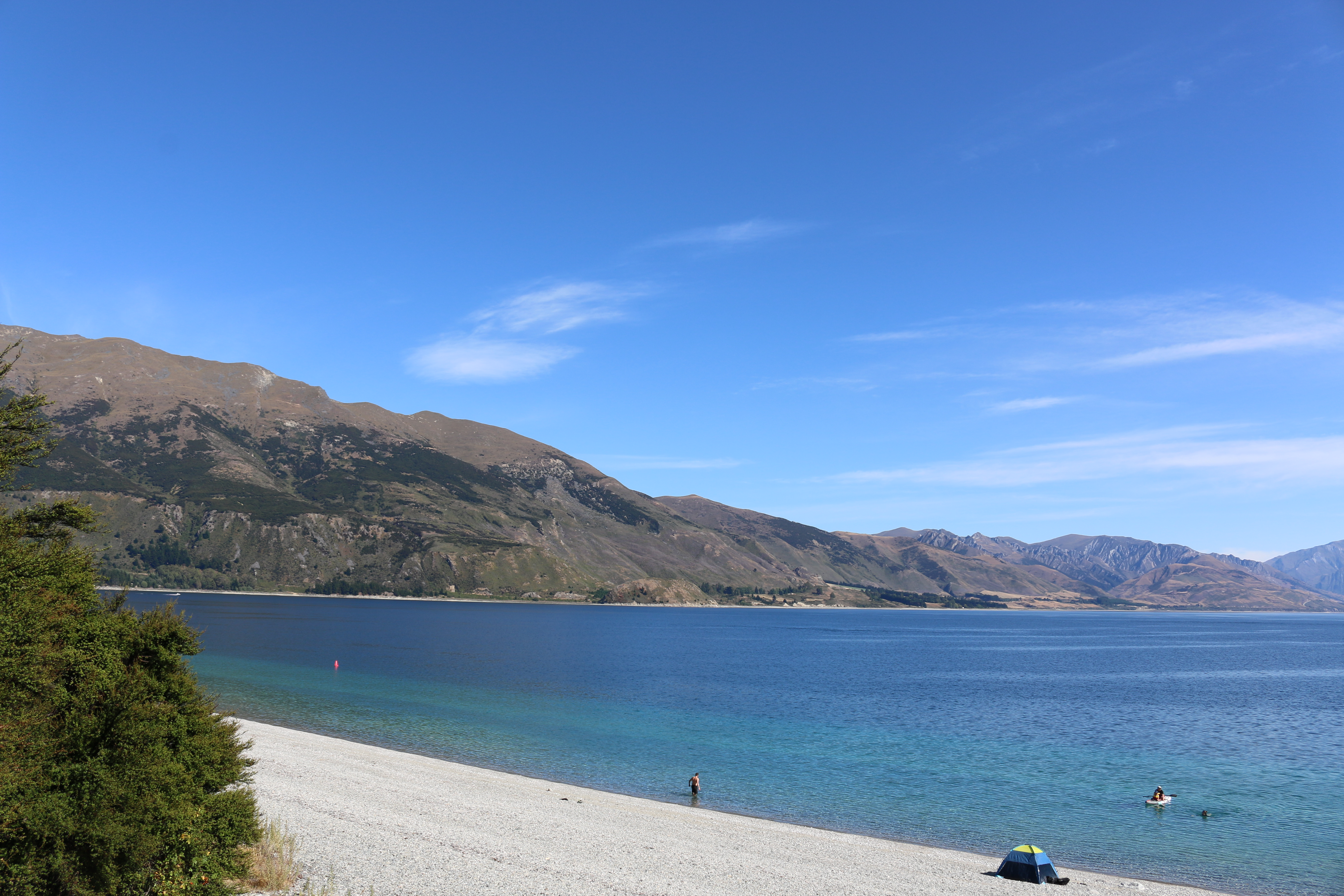
Lake Hāwea in summer

Lake Hāwea is dammed to the south by an ancient terminal moraine created 10,000 years ago. In 1958, the lake was artificially raised 20 metres to store more water for increased hydroelectric power generation at the Roxburgh Dam.

The only flat land around the lake is at its southern end, surrounding its outflow into the Hāwea River, a short tributary of the Clutha / Matau-au, which it joins near Albert Town. The settlement of Lake Hāwea is found at the lake's southern shore.

The lake is a popular resort, well used in the summer for fishing, boating and swimming. The nearby mountains and fast-flowing rivers allow for adventure tourism year-round, such as jetboating and skiing.

== Māori history ==
For Māori, the Wānaka and Hāwea area was a natural crossroads. The Haast Pass led to the West Coast and its pounamu (greenstone); the Cardrona Valley led to the natural rock bridge "Whatatorere" which was the only place that the Kawarau River and Clutha River / Mata-Au could be crossed without boats. Mōkihi reed boats enabled a swift return downriver to the east coast.

The Cromwell basin supported a large population of moa, which were hunted to extinction about 500 years ago.

Until the early nineteenth century, the area was visited annually by Ngāi Tahu who sought pounamu in the mountains above the Haast River and hunted eels and birds over summer, returning to the east coast by descending the Clutha River / Mata-Au in reed boats. Ngāi Tahu use of the land was ended by attacks by North Island tribes. In 1836, the Ngāti Tama chief Te Pūoho led a 100-person war party, armed with muskets, down the West Coast and over the Haast Pass: they fell on the Ngāi Tahu encampment between Lake Wānaka and Lake Hāwea, capturing 10 people and killing and eating two children. Although Te Pūoho was later killed by the southern Ngāi Tahu leader Tūhawaiki, Maori seasonal visits to the area ceased.

The first European to see the lake was Nathanael Chalmers in 1853. Guided by Reko and Kaikōura, he walked from Tuturau (Southland) to the lakes via the Kawarau River. He was stricken by dysentery, so his guides returned him down the Clutha in a reed boat.

== Hydropower ==
The lake's water level is managed by Contact Energy as part of the Clutha River's hydroelectricity system.

In 2025, the electricity company proposed reducing the lake's minimum operating level from 338 metres to 336m above sea level - and, in extreme circumstances, dropping it as low as 330m.

== Namesakes ==
There have been three Royal New Zealand Navy ships named after the lake, one of which is still in active service.

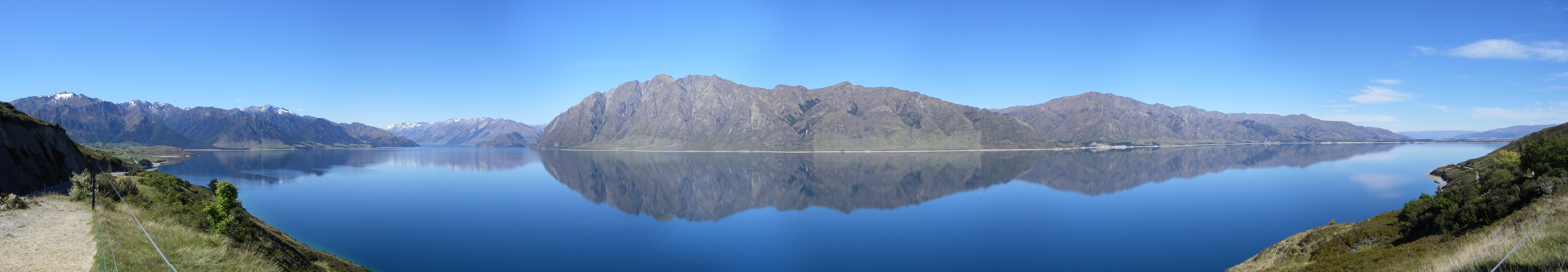
Lake Hāwea panorama

== See also ==
- List of lakes in New Zealand
- Lakes of New Zealand

== Other sources ==
- Hawea
- Wise's New Zealand guide: A gazetteer of New Zealand (4th ed.) (1969) Dunedin: H. Wise & Co. (N.Z.) Ltd.
- Encyclopædia Britannica. Retrieved February 2006, from Encyclopædia Britannica Premium Service.
- Cooper, Alan F.; Norris, Richard J. (3 July 2017). "Structural evolution of the semischist–schist transition in an accretionary complex: the Otago Schist section at Lake Hāwea, New Zealand". New Zealand Journal of Geology and Geophysics. 60 (3): 296–313. Bibcode:2017NZJGG..60..296C. doi:10.1080/00288306.2017.1331916.
