= Albert Town, New Zealand =

Albert Town
- Town
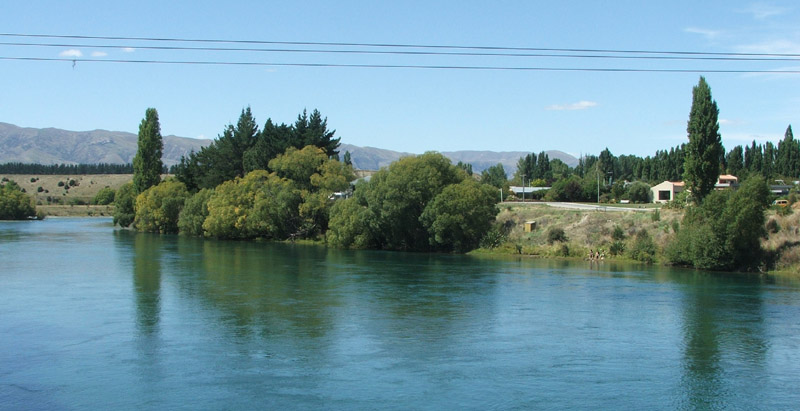
- The young Clutha River at Albert Town
- Interactive map of Albert Town
- Coordinates: 44.683°S 169.190°E
- Country: New Zealand
- Region: Otago
- Territorial authority: Queenstown Lakes District
- Ward: Wānaka Ward

Government
  - Local authority: Queenstown-Lakes District Council
  - Regional council: Otago Regional Council

Area
  - Total: 3.89 km^{2} (1.50 sq mi)

Population (June 2025)
  - Total: 2,360
  - Density: 607/km^{2} (1,570/sq mi)
- Postcode: 9305

Albert Town is located to the east of Wānaka in Otago, New Zealand. Until recently only a farming settlement, the population boom in this area has led to much new development. The confluence of the Clutha and Hāwea Rivers is located here. The town was named after Prince Albert of Saxe-Coburg and Gotha. Albert Town was formerly called Newcastle.

== Demographics ==
Albert Town covers 3.89 km^{2} (1.50 sq mi) and had an estimated population of 2,360 as of June 2025, with a population density of 607 people per km^{2}.

Historical population
Year	Pop.	±% p.a.
2006	705	—
2013	1,287	+8.98%
2018	2,031	+9.55%

Before the 2023 census, Albert Town had a larger boundary, covering 4.96 km^{2} (1.92 sq mi). Using that boundary, Albert Town had a population of 2,031 at the 2018 New Zealand census, an increase of 744 people (57.8%) since the 2013 census, and an increase of 1,326 people (188.1%) since the 2006 census. There were 687 households. There were 1,020 males and 1,014 females, giving a sex ratio of 1.01 males per female. The median age was 37.3 years (compared with 37.4 years nationally), with 468 people (23.0%) aged under 15 years, 282 (13.9%) aged 15 to 29, 1,080 (53.2%) aged 30 to 64, and 204 (10.0%) aged 65 or older.

Ethnicities were 95.4% European/Pākehā, 6.8% Māori, 0.7% Pacific peoples, 1.9% Asian, and 2.2% other ethnicities (totals add to more than 100% since people could identify with multiple ethnicities).

The proportion of people born overseas was 24.5%, compared with 27.1% nationally.

Although some people objected to giving their religion, 67.8% had no religion, 24.4% were Christian, 0.1% were Hindu, 0.1% were Muslim, 0.3% were Buddhist and 1.9% had other religions.

Of those at least 15 years old, 459 (29.4%) people had a bachelor or higher degree, and 126 (8.1%) people had no formal qualifications. The median income was $41,700, compared with $31,800 nationally. 354 people (22.6%) earned over $70,000 compared to 17.2% nationally. The employment status of those at least 15 was that 945 (60.5%) people were employed full-time, 303 (19.4%) were part-time, and 15 (1.0%) were unemployed.

== Climate ==
Climate data for Albert Town (1941–1970)
Month	Jan	Feb	Mar	Apr	May	Jun	Jul	Aug	Sep	Oct	Nov	Dec	Year
Mean daily maximum °C (°F)	24.5 (76.1)	24.5 (76.1)	21.0 (69.8)	17.0 (62.6)	12.0 (53.6)	8.5 (47.3)	8.5 (47.3)	11.0 (51.8)	15.5 (59.9)	17.5 (63.5)	19.5 (67.1)	22.5 (72.5)	16.8 (62.3)
Daily mean °C (°F)	17.3 (63.1)	17.0 (62.6)	14.3 (57.7)	10.3 (50.5)	6.5 (43.7)	3.3 (37.9)	3.0 (37.4)	5.0 (41.0)	8.5 (47.3)	10.8 (51.4)	12.8 (55.0)	15.5 (59.9)	10.4 (50.6)
Mean daily minimum °C (°F)	10.0 (50.0)	9.5 (49.1)	7.5 (45.5)	3.5 (38.3)	1.0 (33.8)	−2.0 (28.4)	−2.5 (27.5)	−1.0 (30.2)	1.5 (34.7)	4.0 (39.2)	6.0 (42.8)	8.5 (47.3)	3.8 (38.9)
Source: NIWA
