= Waiwera River =

Waiwera River may refer to:

- Waiwera River (Auckland)
- Waiwera River (Otago)
