= Lindis Pass =

Mountain pass in the South Island of New Zealand

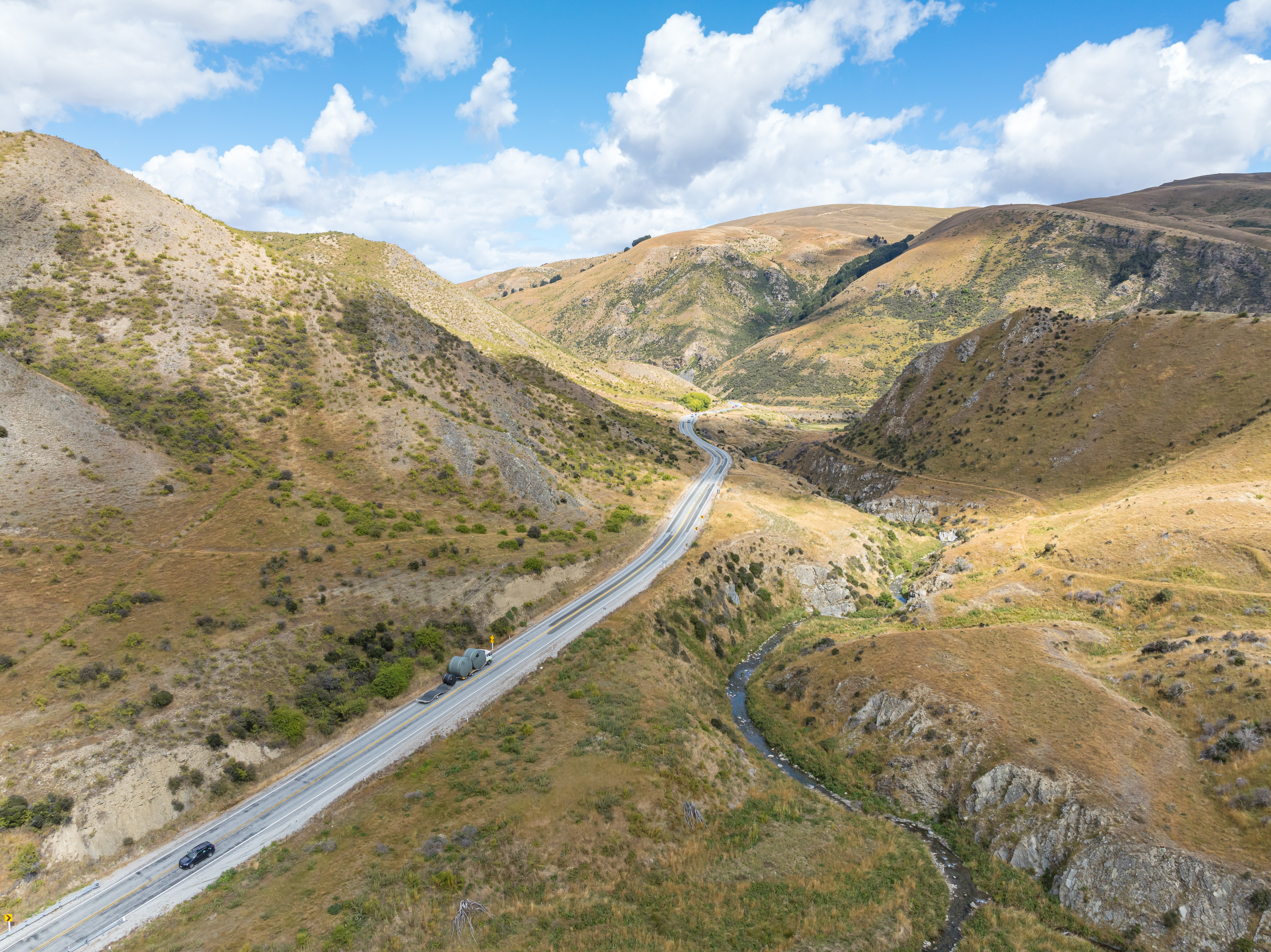
- Aerial Lindis Pass

- Location within New Zealand
- Elevation: 971 m (3,186 ft)
- Traversed by: State Highway 8

Location
- Location: New Zealand
- Range: Southern Alps
- Coordinates: 44°35′16″S 169°38′52″E

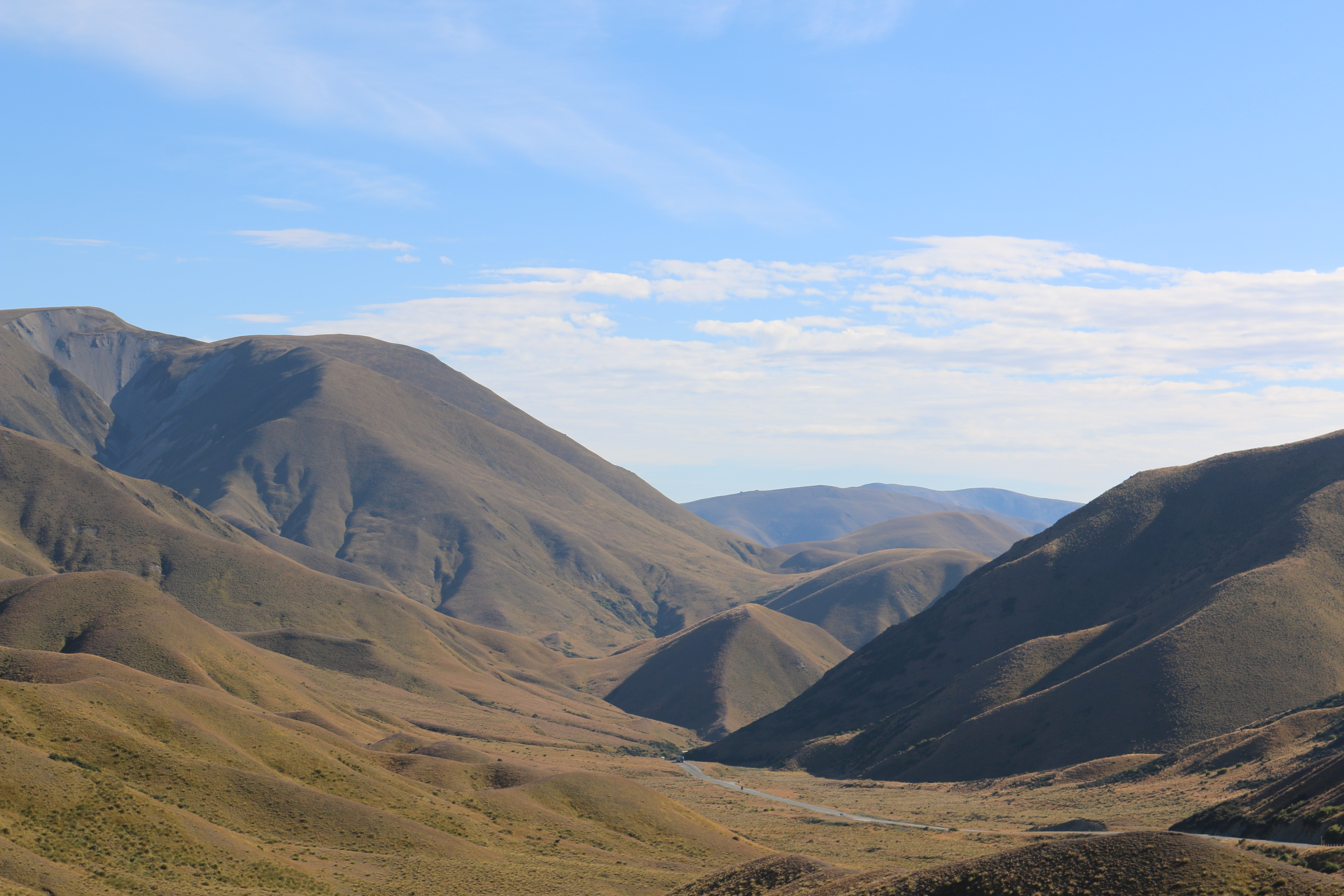
Lindis Pass in summer

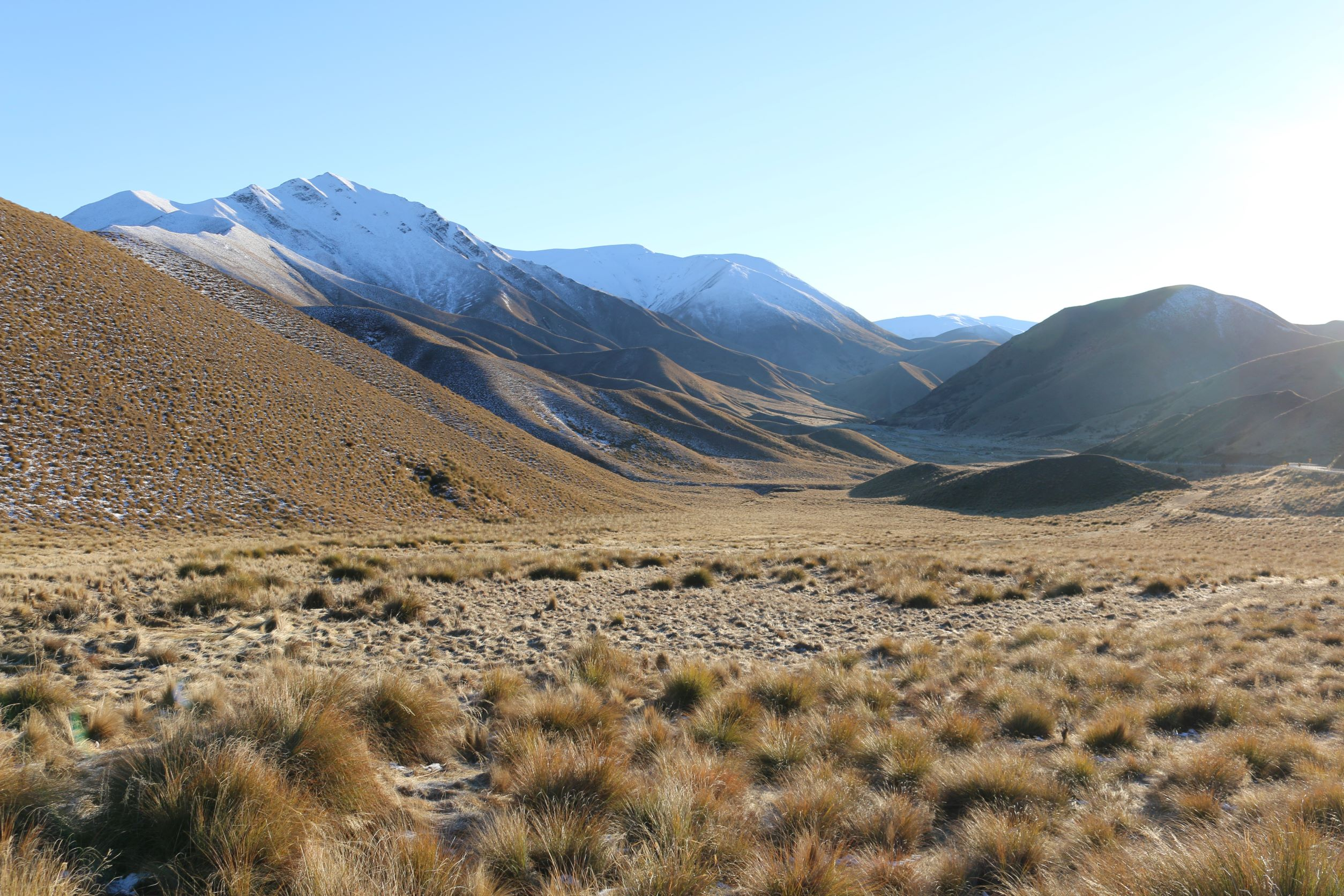
Lindis Pass in winter

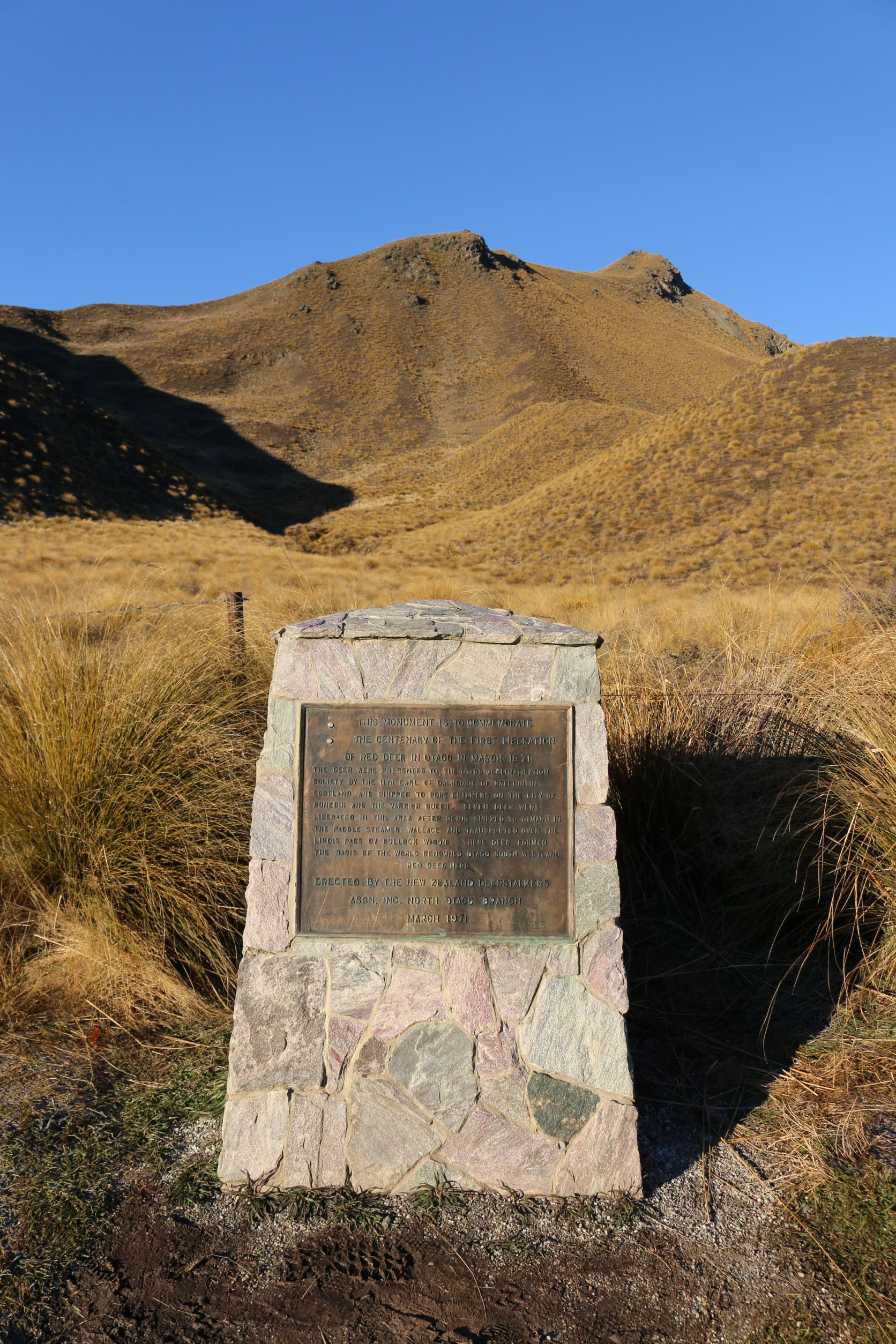
Monument erected in 1971 celebrating 100 years since red deer were first liberated in Otago

The Lindis Pass (Māori: Ōmakō; elevation: 971 m) is located in the South Island of New Zealand.

The Lindis Pass lies between the valleys of the Lindis and Ahuriri Rivers. It lies between the towns of Cromwell (78 km, 55 minutes drive) in Central Otago and Omarama (32 km, 21 minutes drive) in North Otago, on the main inland route to Canterbury's Mackenzie Basin.

State Highway 8 transverses the pass on its route from the Waitaki Basin to Central Otago. The pass is the highest point on the South Island's state highway network, and the second highest point on the New Zealand state highway network, after the Desert Road on SH 1 in the central North Island. Despite this, it is not considered one of the alpine passes as it located in the dry interior of the South Island. Summers are typically hot and dry while heavy snow and frequent ice are common in winter.

The Lindis Pass had a web camera installed in 2018 to help ensure traffic controllers and maintenance crews can monitor the highway, as well as informing travellers so they are prepared for road conditions. Vehicle crashes on the Lindis Pass have occurred regularly. The lack of cellphone coverage around the Lindis Pass adds to the danger of crashes, as rescue services may not learn of any crashes for some time. The New Zealand Transport Agency has upgraded aspects of SH 8 over the Lindis Pass by installing new wire-rope safety barriers, improving signage and installing electronic speed warnings in 2013.

A carpark at the top of the pass provides access to a viewpoint and two short trails to other viewing spots. The pass is surrounded on all sides by grassland which includes snow tussock. Buttercups (ranunculus haastii) are very common on nearby Longslip Mountain (elevation 1,494 metres (4,902 ft)). Kārearea (New Zealand falcon), pihoihoi (New Zealand pipit), and spotted skink can be seen in the Lindis Pass. The lower altitude beech forests and shrublands provide habitat for pīwakawaka (fantail), riroriro (grey warbler), and tītitipounamu (rifleman).
