= Clutha Mata-Au River Parkway Group =

New Zealand society

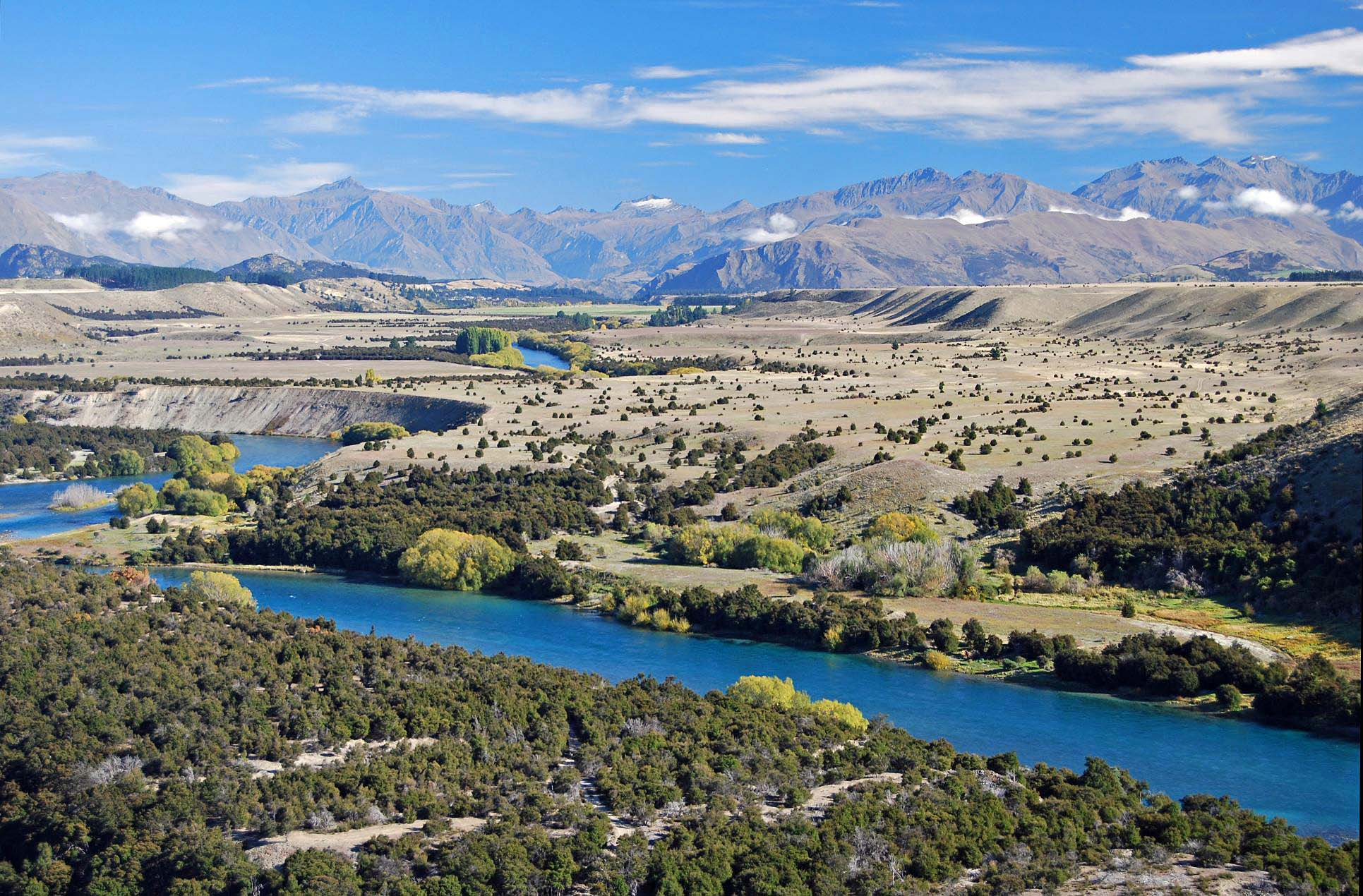
Upper Clutha Valley.

The Clutha Mata-Au River Parkway Group, New Zealand, was registered as an Incorporared Society in December 2003 and registered with Charities Services in 2008 The Group was set up in response to land development issues along the Clutha River / Mata-Au corridor, much of which has high scenic and recreational values. The project aims to establish a regional river parkway, including a river trail, along the entire 338 km river corridor from Lake Wānaka to the Pacific Ocean.

== Description ==
The mission statement of the group is: 'To protect and improve the natural, recreational, and cultural values of the Clutha Mata-Au River corridor, from Lake Wānaka to the Pacific, by establishing a Clutha Mata-Au River Parkway, including a Clutha River Trail, with an integrated management body to safeguard the public interest with a long-term vision.'

The Parkway Group is working with trail-focused community groups such as the Clutha Gold Trail Trust, and the Upper Clutha Tracks Trust, to create a contiguous trail that is expected to attract tourists, bringing economic benefits to the region and facilitating further river corridor improvements such as native restoration.

The Clutha Mata-Au River is New Zealand's largest and most powerful river. It carves 338 km from the Southern Alps to the Pacific Ocean, traversing the semi-desert interior of Otago known as Central Otago.

The waters of the Clutha Mata-Au are clear turquoise in the upper reaches, a characteristic that results from glacial and snow-melt filtering by upland lakes, especially Lake Wānaka. In global terms this is rare, because glacially fed rivers are normally discoloured by rock flour. The Clutha Mata-Au is also often listed among the world's swiftest rivers.

== History ==
Historically, the river has been the focus of intense gold-mining. The Otago gold rush began in 1861, and it was this influx of people that led to the establishment of many of the river towns that still exist today, such as Alexandra, Clyde, and Cromwell.

In 1956, a large hydro-electric dam was commissioned at Roxburgh, flooding the deep-sided Roxburgh Gorge and several well-known rapids, including the Molyneux Falls and the Golden Falls. Another large dam was commissioned at Clyde in 1992, flooding the Cromwell Gorge and the often photographed Cromwell Junction where the silty Kawarau River merged reluctantly with the clear Upper Clutha. The Clyde Dam was highly controversial, having been mistakenly built above an active fault, the River Channel Fault.

The owners of these dams, Contact Energy, announced in February 2009 that they were revisiting former plans for four more large dams on the Clutha Mata-Au. Some people believe that this development would provide jobs and new lakes for recreation, and that the industrialisation of the river valley is an acceptable consequence. However, the Clutha Mata-Au River Parkway Group strongly opposes further damming of the river, as do many people in the river communities.

In October, 2009, the Clutha Mata-Au River Parkway Group facilitated the formation of the Clutha River Forum, an alliance of conservation groups and concerned individuals throughout Otago and New Zealand, who have resolved to work together to prevent further Think Big dams on the Clutha River. Members of the Forum include: Upper Clutha River Guardians, Clutha Mata-Au River Parkway Group, Central Otago Environmental Society (Save Central), Beaumont Residents Group, Lower Clutha River Guardians, Forest & Bird (Dunedin / Central – Lakes). The Forum is campaigning for "Option 5 - NO More Dams".
