= Lake Roxburgh =

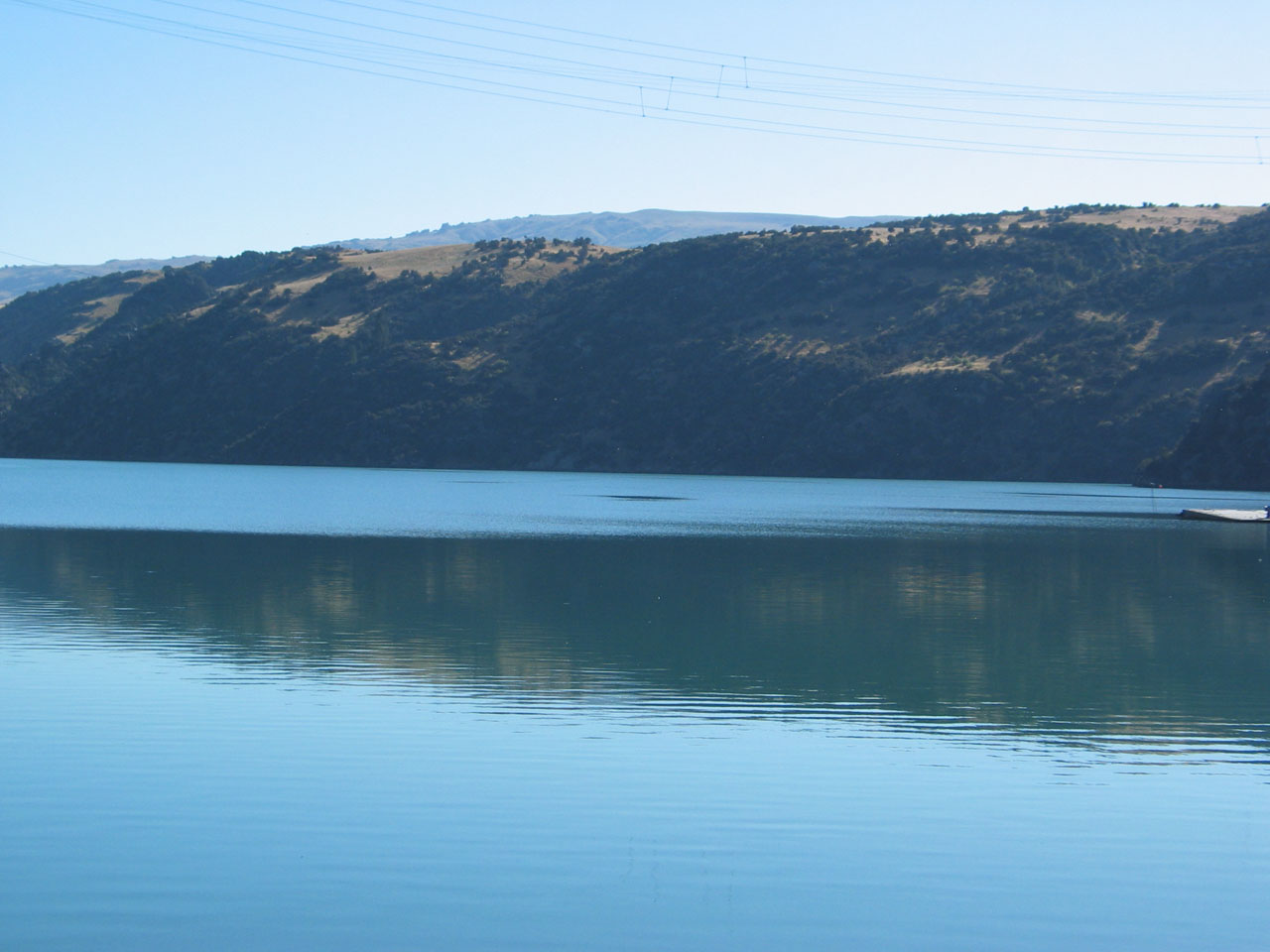
- Lake Roxburgh

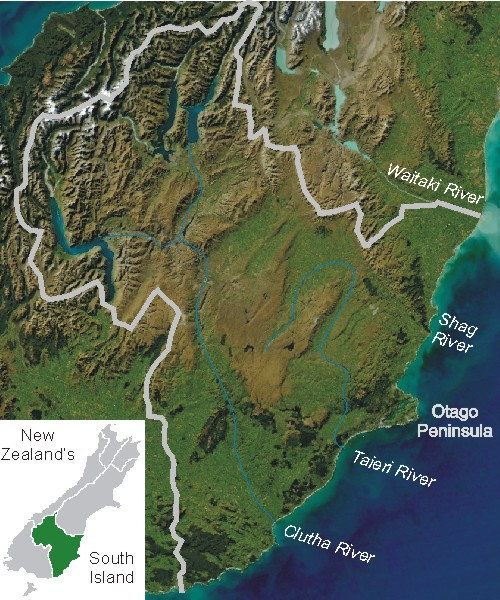
- Location within Otago peninsula
- Location: Central Otago District, Otago Region, South Island
- Coordinates: 45.471°S 169.328°E
- Type: Artificial lake
- Primary inflows: Clutha River
- Primary outflows: Clutha River
- Basin countries: New Zealand
- Surface area: 6 km^{2} (2.3 sq mi)
- Surface elevation: 132 m (433 ft)

Lake Roxburgh is an artificial lake, created by the Roxburgh Dam, the earliest of the large hydroelectric projects in the southern South Island of New Zealand. It lies on the Clutha River, some 160 km (99 mi) from Dunedin. It covers an area of some 6 km^{2} (2.3 sq mi), and extends for nearly 30 km (19 mi) towards the town of Alexandra. The town of Roxburgh lies 5 kilometres (3.1 mi) south of the Dam.

== Demographics ==
Lake Roxburgh Village is described by Statistics New Zealand as a rural settlement. It covers 0.69 km^{2} (0.27 sq mi) and had an estimated population of 90 as of June 2025, with a population density of 130 people per km^{2}. It is part of the much larger Teviot Valley statistical area.

Historical population
Year	Pop.	±% p.a.
2006	72	—
2013	75	+0.58%
2018	81	+1.55%

Lake Roxburgh Village had a population of 81 at the 2018 New Zealand census, an increase of 6 people (8.0%) since the 2013 census, and an increase of 9 people (12.5%) since the 2006 census. There were 36 households, comprising 39 males and 42 females, giving a sex ratio of 0.93 males per female. The median age was 59.2 years (compared with 37.4 years nationally), with 6 people (7.4%) aged under 15 years, 15 (18.5%) aged 15 to 29, 33 (40.7%) aged 30 to 64, and 24 (29.6%) aged 65 or older.

Ethnicities were 88.9% European/Pākehā, 18.5% Māori, 7.4% Pasifika, and 3.7% Asian. People may identify with more than one ethnicity.

Although some people chose not to answer the census's question about religious affiliation, 59.3% had no religion, and 37.0% were Christian.

Of those at least 15 years old, 3 (4.0%) people had a bachelor's or higher degree, and 24 (32.0%) people had no formal qualifications. The median income was $20,800, compared with $31,800 nationally. 3 people (4.0%) earned over $70,000 compared to 17.2% nationally. The employment status of those at least 15 was that 30 (40.0%) people were employed full-time, 15 (20.0%) were part-time, and 3 (4.0%) were unemployed.
