= Lindis River =

River in New Zealand

Coordinates: 44°53′S 169°21′E

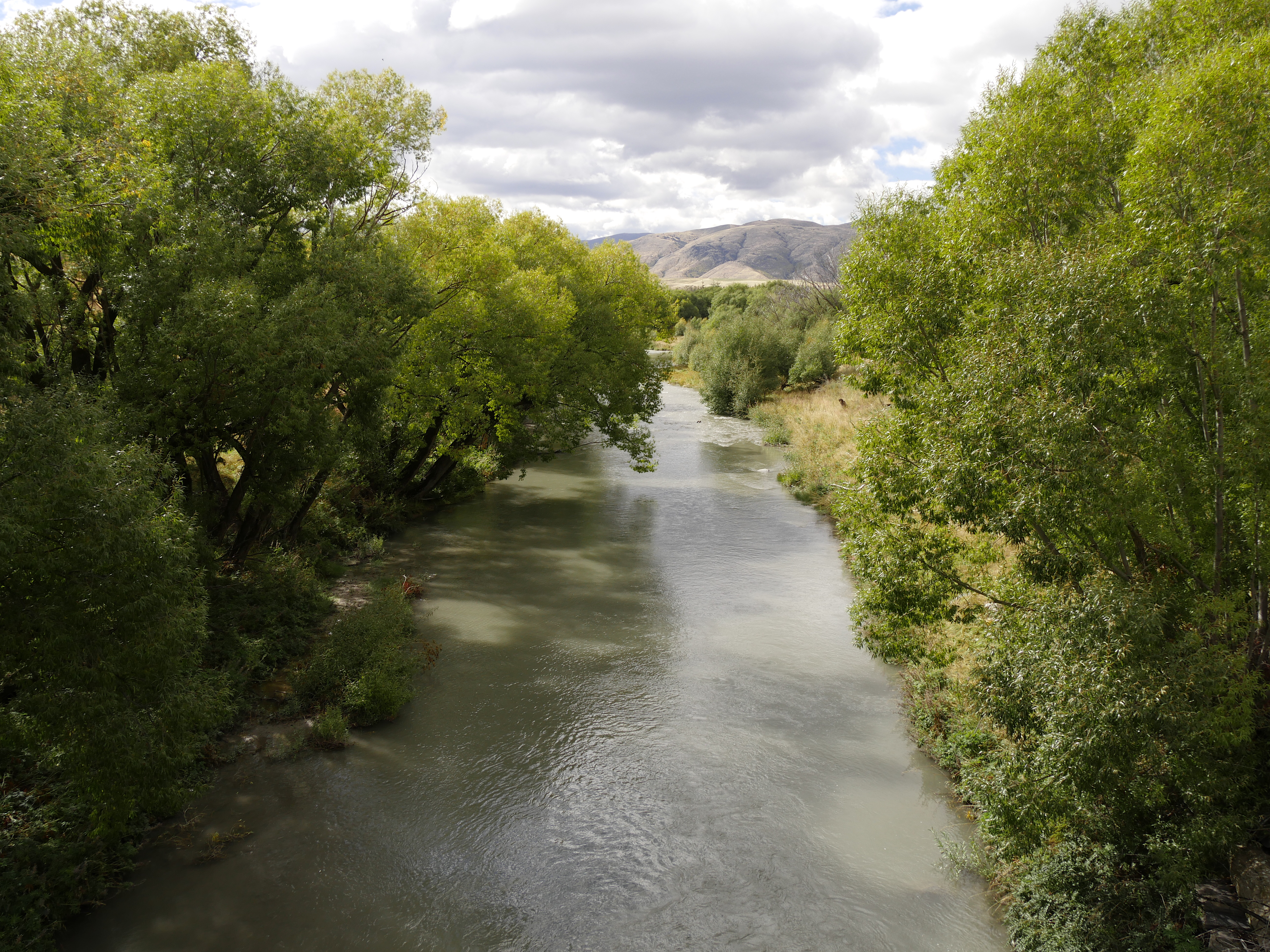

The Lindis River is found in Otago in the South Island of New Zealand. It is a tributary of the Clutha River / Mata-Au, flowing south for 55 kilometres (34 mi) through the Lindis Pass, site of the main inland road route between Otago and the Mackenzie Basin in Canterbury.

The Lindis river supports a number of fish species, including brown trout, Clutha flathead galaxiid, common bully, upland bully and longfin eel.
