= Nathanael Chalmers =

New Zealand politician and farmer (1830–1910)

Nathanael Chalmers (22 August 1830 – 2 December 1910) was a New Zealand pastoralist, explorer, politician, planter, sugar miller and magistrate. He was born in Rothesay, on the island of Bute, Scotland on 22 August 1830. He was a member of the Legislative Council of Fiji from 1879 to 1883.

Chalmers was the first European to see the South Island of New Zealand inland lakes of Wakatipu, Wānaka and Hāwea as well as the valleys of the Upper Clutha River in 1853.
