= Hunter River (New Zealand) =

Coordinates: 44°22′S 169°25′E

Hunter River, New Zealand

Location
- Country: New Zealand

The Hunter River, New Zealand is a river of New Zealand, flowing into Lake Hāwea.

== See also ==
- List of rivers of New Zealand
