= Roxburgh Dam =

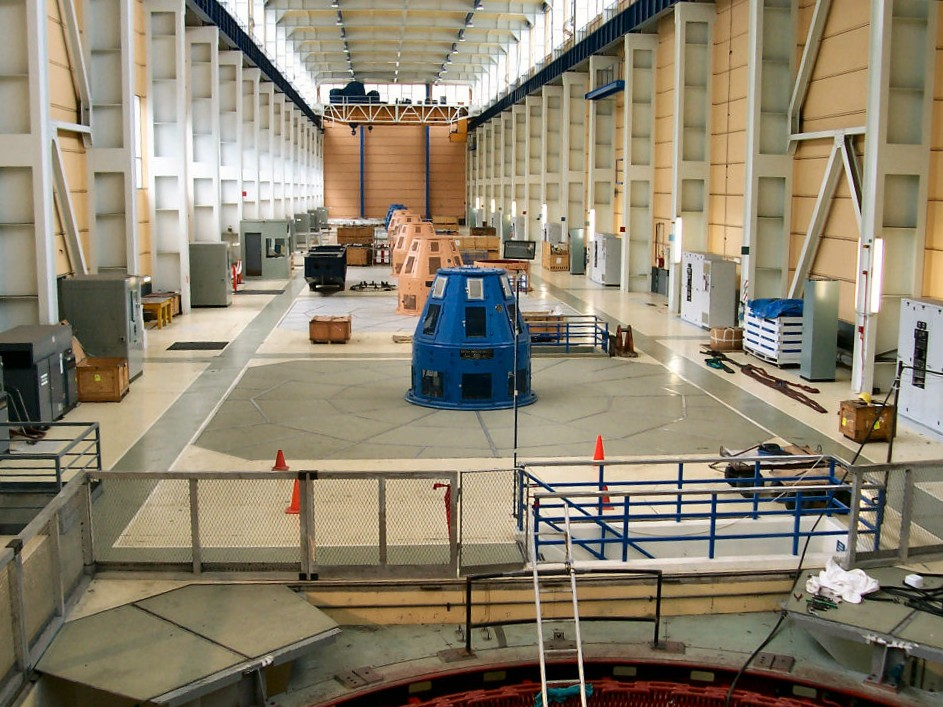
- Roxburgh Dam machine hall

- Location within New Zealand
- Location: Central Otago, New Zealand
- Coordinates: 45.475811°S 169.322555°E
- Construction began: 1949
- Opening date: 3 November 1956
- Construction cost: £24.1 million
- Owner: Contact Energy

Dam and spillways
- Type of dam: Concrete gravity dam
- Impounds: Clutha River / Mata-Au
- Height: 76 m (249 ft)
- Length: 358 m (1,175 ft)
- Width (crest): 10.7 m (35 ft)
- Width (base): 61 m (200 ft)
- Spillway capacity: 4,248 m^{3}/s (150,000 cu ft/s)

Reservoir
- Creates: Lake Roxburgh
- Surface area: 6 km^{2} (2.3 sq mi)
- Normal elevation: 132 m

Power Station
- Operator: Contact Energy
- Commission date: 1956 − 1962
- Turbines: 8
- Installed capacity: 320 MW (430,000 hp)
- Annual generation: 1,650 GWh (5,900 TJ)

The Roxburgh Dam is the earliest of the large hydroelectric projects in the lower half of the South Island of New Zealand. It lies across the Clutha River / Mata-Au, some 160 kilometres (99 mi) from Dunedin, some 9 kilometres (5.6 mi) to the north of the town of Roxburgh. The settlement of Lake Roxburgh Village is close to the western edge of the dam.

== History ==
=== Development ===
In 1944 the State Hydro Department estimated that even with the power stations currently under construction they would only be able to meet projected South Island load up until 1950 or 1951 and that a new large power station was required. Detailed investigations by the Public Works Department identified two alternatives, Black Jack's Point on the Waitaki River (where eventually Benmore Power Station would be built) and Roxburgh Gorge on the Clutha River. A power station at Lake Roxburgh had the advantage of being less remote, requiring less geological investigation, half the materials for the same power output and a better climate in which to undertake construction work, which were important considerations at a time of serious shortages of labour and cement.

Historical records showed that the long term flow of the river was 500 m^{3}/s (17,650 cu ft/s) and that a controlled flow of 420 m^{3}/s (15,000 cu ft/s) would be possible through the power station. The designers estimated that with an overall efficiency of 85% the mean output would be 160 MW and assuming an annual power factor of 50% the station could deliver a maximum output of 320 MW.

The Clutha River is fed from Lake Hāwea, Lake Wakatipu, and Lake Wānaka. There were already existing control gates on the Kawarau River at the outlet of Lake Wakatipu and it was decided to control the flows from the remaining lakes. After investigation found that the soil conditions were unsuitable at Lake Wanaka and only Lake Hāwea received new control structure. This was commissioned in 1958 and consists of four radial gates housed in an earth dam. The dam raised the existing lake level and currently provides approximately 290 GWh of storage.

In December 1947, the Labour Government approved plans to build a hydro power station on the Clutha River. Initially only three 40 MW generating units were to be installed with the station having an ultimate planned capacity of 320 MW. The Clutha River between Alexandra and Roxburgh runs through a deep gorge which offered a number of locations for a power station. Investigations identified five alternative schemes at the Pleasant Valley site, and one scheme at the Tamblyn's Orchard site. Initially Site No. 4 at Pleasant Valley, about 2.4 kilometres (1.5 mi) upstream from Tamblyn's Orchard was favoured. Subsequent detailed design studies however found that Tamblyn's Orchard at Coal Creek where the river exited the Roxburgh Gorge near the town of Roxburgh offered the fullest possible head and thus the most power output, better tailwater conditions, the best access and would be closest to suitable locations for both construction and permanent villages.

In March 1949 the government committed to building at Tamblyn's Orchard and plans were prepared to enable work on the diversion channel to start in June 1949. In October 1949 at the request of the Ministry of Works and Development (MOW), John Lucian Savage visited the site and provided advice on the proposed design options. While an earth dam was more suitable at the wider Pleasant Valley location after considering various options it was decided in October 1950 that due to the geology at Tamblyn's Orchard a solid-concrete gravity dam would be more appropriate. Another consideration was that the MOW had limited experience with the construction of earthen dams and its only engineers with the necessary experience were engaged on the Cobb Power Station.

Many of the design decisions were based upon results from studies undertaken from 1949 to 1954 on a 1:80 scale model of the dam at the Department of Scientific and Industrial Research's Hydraulics Laboratory at Gracefield, Lower Hutt.

Initially the project was known as the Coal Creek scheme but after the Geographical Board had been consulted the name Roxburgh was chosen as name of the power station in 1947.

=== Construction ===
==== Work commences on site ====
The MOW was the government department responsible for designing and constructing the government power station in New Zealand. Though it was still unresolved who would be designing and building the dam and power station Fritz Langbein the engineer in chief of the MOW assumed that his organisation would be undertaking the design and would at the least build the diversion channel. Therefore, he put in place plans to build a construction village and in July 1949 had the MOW commence work on the excavation of the diversion channel. This channel would eventually be 2,000 ft (610 m) long, 100 ft (30 m) wide and 70 ft (21 m) deep which required the removal of 255,000 cu yd (195,000 m^{3}) of material.

By the end of 1950, 720 workers were being employed on site.

==== Construction village ====
In 1947, to house the workforce, the Ministry of Works first built a single men's camp and cookhouse on the west bank of the river. In 1950, work began on erecting 100 workers' cottages. The following year began on building a YMCA hall, shops, a hospital and nurses accommodation and a further 225 cottages. Eventually the village grew to 724 houses complete with a 90-bed hostel, a 600-child primary school, a cinema, a social hall, 17 shops, three churches, a fire brigade and ambulance building, four tennis courts, a swimming pool and a piped sewage scheme. In addition there were four single men's camps (two on the east and two on the west bank) containing a total of 1000 huts. These facilities cost a total of NZ£2,241,925.

As the Otago Central Electric Power Board's network could not provide sufficient power to the village and the project, the government built a temporary power station containing two 1 MW and one 0.4 MW diesel generators, to supplement the supply.

==== Transportation of materials and equipment ====
In May 1946 the PWD and the New Zealand Railways Department held a meeting to determine what would be needed to transport materials to the proposed site of the power station. The main loads associated with the first four generating units were as follows: thirteen generator transformers, each 39.5 tons (40.1 tonnes), 15 ft 6 in (4.72 m) long, 10 ft 4 in (3.15 m) high, 8 ft 2 in (2.49 m) wide; twenty-four stator sections; each about 19 tons (19.3 tonnes) gross, 14 ft 9 in (4.5 m) by 9 ft 1 in (2.77 m) by 6 ft (1.83 m); four shafts and thrust plates, each 33½ tons (34 tonnes) gross, 20 ft (6.1 m) long by 6 ft 6in (1.98 m) by 7 ft 10 in (2.39 m); four turbine runners, each 25 tons (25.4 tonnes), 12 ft 10 in (3.91 m) diameter, 6 ft 7 in (2 m) high; four generator bottom bearing brackets, each 20 tons (20.3 tonne) gross, 12 ft (3.66 m) by 12 ft by 6 ft 1 in (1.85 m).

The most direct rail route was via the Roxburgh Branch line to its terminus at Roxburgh. However this line had an uncompensated 1 in 41 grades and five chain (100.6 metre) curves that would limit the loads to 180 tons per engine. As well, four tunnels including those at Manuka and Round Hill on the line restricted the physical size of what could be transported, leading to consideration being given to enlarging them. This would have been expensive and restricted use of the line while it was being undertaken. As an alternative, an investigation was undertaken into lengthening the Tapanui Branch line from its terminus at Edievale though a tunnel and some clay cuttings in the Dunrobin Hills to the Clutha River where it could connect with the Roxburgh branch line. Eventually, it was decided to use the Roxburgh branch line for all construction materials and smaller items of equipment wherever possible. These were transported on the Main South Line to Milton where they transferred to the Roxburgh branch which conveyed them to Roxburgh, and from there transported by road to the power station. Consideration was given to extending the line to the construction site but this wasn't proceeded with due to the difficulty of getting past the east end of the existing Roxburgh suspension bridge. To improve the line's carrying capacity, some curve easements were undertaken near Round Hill.

As the load carrying capacity of the existing roads was constrained by bridges at Henley (on State Highway 1 and Beaumont on State Highway 8) it was decided that due to the fact that the Waikaka Branch railway line had no constricting tunnels, it would be used to transport out of gauge heavy items such as the turbine runners and bottom bearing brackets. These items were transported on the Main South Line from the port at Bluff to the junction at McNab and then via the Waikaka branch line to its terminus at Waikaka. From there, they were transported by road to the power station using a specialised transporter. This assisted in the transfer from rail to road transport, and a 4-pole 30 ton (30.5 tonne) gantry was erected at the Waikaka railway station to aid with the transport. The road between Roxburgh and the construction site was upgraded, and a second bridge was built on the over the Teviot River on the eastern side of the Clutha River to supplement the existing bridge. At the construction site, a 220 ft (67 m) long single-lane Bailey bridge with a carrying capacity of 24 tons (24.4 tonnes) was installed in 1949 to provide access across the river.

Timber used in the construction of the power station and the village was sourced from the Conical Hills Mill at Tapauni and taken via the Tapanui Branch to the Main South Line which provided a connection via the Roxburgh branch line to Roxburgh. At its peak up to 15,000 to 20,000 ft of timber was being transported by rail on a daily basis.

At the Roxburgh railway station the PWD erected silos to store the expected 50,000 tons of cement a year that would be consumed at the project's peak as well as a six-pole 60 ton (61 tonne) lifting gantry It was expected that Shipments of bulk cement began in mid 1953 and by July of that year 600 to 1,100 tons were being shipped per week. By July 1955 demand had dropped to 800 tons per week with shipping of cement finishing in November 1956. By April 1956 Milburn had supplied 105,000 tons of cement with another 10,000 tons still to be delivered to complete the project.

NZR operated occasional sightseeing trains from Dunedin and Christchurch. The cost of a combined return rail and transfer bus ticket from Dunedin to the site of the power station was 16 shillings.

Wherever possible, equipment was shipped on the Dunedin-Roxburgh Railway Line to Roxburgh and from there transported by road to the power station. For instance, the transformers were railed from Port Chalmers to Roxburgh on the 40-ton well-wagons and then taken to the power station site on a Rogers 40-ton tank transporter. The stator sections and shafts followed a similar route.

Because of the line, larger tunnels on the Waikaka Branch railway line the turbine runners and generator bottom bearing brackets were transported on this line. From the line's terminus at Waikaka, they were transported by road to the power station using a specialised transporter.

==== Unsolicited offer ====
The Ministry of Works had identified that it had a shortage of the engineering and drafting staff to undertake the large amount of power station construction that the government had committed to in the North and South islands. Fritz Langbein believed that provided 1,000 workers could be obtained from overseas then the MOW would be able to complete the entire project in-house by 1954.

In May 1949, the government reluctantly accepted that overseas contractors may have to be employed to meet the planned construction programme. This admission lead to an unsolicited bid being received from a British consortium consisting of civil engineering contractors Richard Costain, electrical manufacturers and contractor English Electric and Insulated Callender Cables to design and build the Roxburgh and other New Zealand power stations.

The Ministry of Works had reservations about the lack of a guaranteed completion date, difficulties with divided responsibility if the consortium undertook both the design and construction, the potential for the cost to be higher than if competitive tenders were called and that it could give the consortium a monopoly over future projects of a similar nature.

The State Hydro-Electric Department didn't want to be restricted to one electrical equipment manufacturer and also saw the offer as a threat to their transmission line construction staff. Taking these concerns into account and wishing to avoid using up precious overseas funds the offer was formally rejected in September 1949 by the Minister of Finance in the Labour government.

Meanwhile, work continued on site on completing the construction village and creating the diversion channel. However progress was slow, with completion of the diversion not expected until 1953 instead of the planned 1951.

==== Call for tenders to contract the dam ====
In 1949 the newly elected national government, which ideologically favoured private enterprise, appointed Stan Goosman as both Minister of Works and Minister of the State Hydro-electric Department. By 1951, the projected project delays were serious enough to draw criticism from the Electrical Supply Authority. Now aware of the energy shortfalls, shortage of government resources to complete other hydroelectric projects as well as Roxburgh's own, Goosman's response was to announce on 25 September 1951 that tenders would be called from interested parties to undertake the civil aspects of the project.

This required the rapid production of tender documents and specifications by a short staffed government design staff. Bidders had the choice of offering on either a bill of quantities basis or by nominating a 'target estimate' plus a 4% fee. In this type of contract the Government met all costs and the contractor received a fee of 4% of the total cost up to the target estimate. If the cost varied from the estimate, then 25% of the change was added to or subtracted from the fee.

A 'no loss clause' meant that if the cost overruns where high enough the contractor could lose their entire fee but would not suffer any further loss, other than those for not meeting agree completion dates. Eight tenders were received. Three were fixed price with a bill of quantities and the remainder were target estimates. The Ministry of Works had estimated that the work would cost £10,198,000 and the average for seven of the bidders was £10,068,838. The lowest bid was £7,4412,419 from Holland, Hannen & Cubitts of England. The government engaged Sir Alexander Gibb & Partners of London to assess the ability of the bidders to undertake the work.

After negotiations with Holland, Hannen & Cubitts of England who were joined by S A Conrad Zschokke, a revised bid was received and on that basis a contract with a target estimate of £8,289,148 and a 4% fee of £331,566 was awarded on 25 July 1952. The contract had provision for a bonus of £350,000 for early completion. There was a penalty for late division of the river and a £1000 penalty for each day past July 1955 that the power station was not ready for service. The target completion date was 1 June 1955.

By late August 1952 the Ministry of Works had completed the two cableways that were to be used to carry concrete to the workface. To manufacture concrete on site the Ministry of Works purchased a Johnson concrete batching plant that had been used by the United States Navy in the reconstruction of Pearl Harbor after the Japanese attack in 1941. This came into operation in early April 1953. Upon completion of Roxburgh the plant was transported first to Benmore power station and then later to Aviemore power station and the Pukaki dam to mix aggregate for the penstocks, spillways and other concrete structures.

The consortium bought from overseas 82 engineers, supervisors and administration staff and 322 workmen to the project and took over the civil aspects from the Ministry of Works on 29 Sept 1952. By this stage, the Ministry of Works had completed the diversion channel and the consortium also took over these workers.

Prior to their involvement with the Roxburgh project Hannen, Holland & Cubitts experience had been limited to commercial and residential buildings. Zschokke who had expertise in the construction of hydraulic structures were limited to only providing engineering services while Cubitts personnel filled all the management roles.

==== Concerns mount ====
By March 1953 the Ministry of Works became concerned at the progress being made by the consortium and that their management team lacked the experience to construct a hydro power station, which was highlighted by the large amount of rework being undertaken. Progress was not helped by the Government directing the employment of a large number of assisted immigrants many of whom had little construction experience and limited English. In early 1953 at the government's expense the consortium flew out 309 workers from Great Britain.

By October 1953 it was clear that the consortium would not meet the contracted July 1955 date for generation of the first power. In an attempt to improve progress the contractor replaced a number of senior project staff. Labour relations were also deteriorating due to uncertainty over the management changes, reduction in working hours to 40 per week and the impact of cost overruns on the workers pay. In November 200 British workers demanded either a 70-hour working week or their tickets back to Great Britain.

==== Downers takeover ====
With it having been necessary in 1953 to introduce power rationing in the South Island due to a shortage of generation the government decided the slow progress couldn't continue and requested two directors of Downer & Co, a major New Zealand construction company to attend in two days time a meeting at the Prime Minister's summer cottage on 24 April 1954. At this meeting which was attended by representatives of the consortium, Arnold Downer and Arch McLean from Downer were requested by the government to enter the project as the managing partner with a 25% interest. After spending £4 million the existing contract was cancelled and a schedule of rates contract was agreed upon with the renamed Cubitts Zschokke Downer with a planned completion date of late 1956.

As a result of the forming of this new consortium Arnold Downer was put in charge of all site activities.

==== Diversion of the river ====
The preliminary works for the diversion of the river got off to a bad start when the explosive charge used in mid-June to remove the upstream dumpling damaged the steel sheet pile cofferdam downstream of it. This cofferdam has been constructed to ensure that water didn't carrying any blast debris from the upper dumpling into the sluice channel. Eventually the debris and the cofferdam were removed, allowing unrestricted flow down the diversion channel.

Now it was necessary to block off the river so all of the water flowed down the diversion channel. The river's average flow was 500 m^{3}/s (17,650 cu ft/s) and by June it had fallen to 170 m^{3}/s (6,000 cu ft/s), but by the time work had been completed to a stage that a firm date of 1 July had been selected to attempt the diversion the flow had increased to 340 m^{3}/s (12,000 cu ft/s). Extra bulldozers were allocated to the attempt as the steady increased to 420 m^{3}/s (15,000 cu ft/s) and then 510 m^{3}/s (18,000 cu ft/s). If the diversion couldn't be completed before the peak winter flows the project would have incurred a delay of between nine and twelve months. Despite studies that had indicated that the conditions were less than optimum Arnold Downer made the decision to go ahead. Using twelve bulldozers sufficient accumulated earth and rocks was moved at a rate of 570 m^{3} (750 cu yd) over twelve hours on 1 July 1954 to successfully divert the river into the diversion channel.

With the river diverted, cofferdams were constructed upstream and downstream of the dam and the water pumped out between them. The upstream cofferdam consumed 180,000 m^{3} (240,000 cu yd) of material, while the downstream cofferdam consumed 54,000 m^{3} (71,000 cu yd) of material.

There were expectations that gold would be found in the exposed river bed, but despite the MOW taking out a mining licence and employing two experienced gold miners, the results were disappointing. Once free of water work commenced on the excavation of the foundations for the main block of the dam. A large gravel filled hole was discovered in the centre channel or "gullet" of the river bed. This gullet which was 50 ft (15 m) deep and varied in width from 50 ft to 30 m (100 ft) was dug out and filled with a mix of pozzolana (fly ash) and cement under the dam while under the powerhouse Prepakt concrete was used as this reduced demand on the batching plant which was fully occupied supplying concrete for the dam blocks.

In July 1954 Downer replaced 20 senior contractor staff that he had inherited with people of this choosing, many from Morrison Knudsen. A significant appointment was that of A. I. Smithies, a very experienced hydro construction engineer from Morrison-Knudsen as construction superintendent. With management in place the workfare was able to be reduced from the 1,107 when Downer took over, to 850. Under Downer's management the pace of construction increased with the weekly concrete pour rapidly improving. In the first week of October 1954 5,400 cu yd (4,100 m^{3}) of concrete was poured, which had increased to 6,700 cu yd (5,100 m^{3}) poured over the course of the next week.

By May 1955 the project was meeting its target dates with work on the powerhouse six months ahead of schedule. The dam was constructed in 50 ft (15 m) wide concrete blocks with 5 ft (1.5 m) wide slots between them constructed in two profiles, those associated with the penstocks had an additional section containing intakes and screens as well as a downstream slope to support the penstock while the other profile had a flatter slope and were only wide enough at the top to house the road across the top of the dam. In conjunction with the block sizes, different concrete mixes and the passing of cold water through cooling coils were used to maintain the block temperature at 10˚C (50˚F) and thus cracking of the concrete. Cracking can allow water into the body of the dam which can lead to allow uplift and instability during earthquakes. Once the blocks had reached its final stable temperature the slots were filled with concrete.

Once the concrete in a block was stable the coils were filled with grout. A 20 ft (6.1 m) deep low pressure consolidation grout curtain was installed on the upstream side of the dame and extending into both abutments to improve the strength of the rock under the dam and prevent leaks. Drainage holes were constructed just downstream of the grout curtain as well as under the power house with 40 pressure gauges installed to record the up pressure on the structure.

A total of 700,000 cu yd (540,000 m^{3}) of concrete were used in the construction of the dam and spillway consuming 600,000 cu yd (460,000 m^{3}). Cement was mostly sourced from the Milburn Lime and Cement Company's factory at Burnside (near Dunedin) or via ship into Port Chalmers. A major expansion was undertaken by Milburn in order to supply the cement. Aggregate was obtained from the Clutha River at Commissioner's Flat, while water came from the river.

Fletcher Holdings subsidiary, Stevenson & Cook manufactured and installed the penstocks, the steel frame of the powerhouse and the spillway gate winches The rolled plates for the penstocks were transported by truck from their factory in Port Chalmers to site where a workforce of 80 men fabricated the plates using automatic submerged arc welders into sections in a purpose built workshop and then installed them in position. All welds were X-rayed during fabrication and radiographed after installation as well as pressure tested except for the concrete encased section at the intake. Stevenson & Cook lost money on the penstock contract, which contributed to the company being wound up in 1959. Fletcher Construction undertook the work to clad and roof the power house.

==== Supply and installation of the electrical equipment ====
The State Hydro-electric Department undertook the design, purchase and installation and commissioning of the electrical equipment. Tenders for supply of the major electrical plant were issued in October 1949 with contracts awarded in May 1950 at a cost of £1,000,000 for the first four generating units.

The State Hydro Department established itself on site in June 1953. Access to undertake their activities was first provided in August 1954 and erection of the first generating unit began with the first scroll case concreted in by March 1955.

In November the joints in the stator windings of the generators were discovered to be faulty. Fortunately sufficient time became available to re-make all the joints when from 24 November 1955 for 23 work days up until the Christmas break the members of the New Zealand Workers Union were on strike in support of a union crane driver who had refused to lower a load being carried by his crane when the siren went for a tea break which the contractors estimated would delay the commencement of lake filling by two months.

==== Construction of the transmission lines ====
To connect the new power station to the major load centres, a 52 mi (83.69 km) long new 110 kV wood pole line was first built to Gore. The linemen then commenced constructing an 89 mi (143.23 km) long double-circuit 110 kV overhead transmission line using lattice steel towers to the Halfway Bush substation at Dunedin which was completed in July 1955 at a cost of approximately £500,000.

The principal connection, however, was a new 266-mile-long (428 km) 220 kV single-circuit overhead transmission line built using lattice steel towers from Roxburgh to a new substation at Islington on the outskirts of Christchurch. By 1949 the surveys for this line were well under way with by 1951 the construction camps established and the material on order. By 1954 the first section of the line had been completed, which allowed it to carry power from Tekapo A to Christchurch. A second section as far south as the Waitaki Valley helped improve supply conditions during winter. The Roxburgh-Islington line cost approximately £1,000,000 and was completed by the winter of 1956.

==== Lake filling ====
With power cuts being applied across the South Island by June 1956, the Minister of Works requested the contractors to concentrate all resources on work that would bring forward lake filling as far as possible. To encourage the workforce, the government offered a bonus of £2 per week plus £1 per day if the lake was filled before 19 August. At midnight on 21 July 1956, lake filling began and the lake level commenced rising at an average of 3 ft (0.91 m) an hour.

As the lake began to fill, increasing levels of water began to flow from the drainage channels behind the grout curtain in the right abutment, which indicated that the grout curtain was faulty. Investigations concluded that further grouting would have to be performed (which took about a fortnight) before the lake could be raised to its final level. The decision was made to allow the lake to fill to no further than the crest of the spillway while the contractors began drilling and inserting more grout. Meanwhile at 12:30 pm on 23 July a speedboat driven by Ken Harliwich and accompanied by Willis Wetherall to leave Roxburgh for Alexandria making the first boat trip on the new lake.

By 11:20 am on 23 July 1956, the lake had filled to the crest of the spillway water. With a desperate shortage of electricity affecting the South Island, commissioning of the generating unit 1 immediately commenced under the direction of electrical resident engineer Eric Gordon “Sandy” Sandelin. The urgency meant that present from head office in Wellington were the State Hydro-Electric Department chief engineer M. G. “Bill” Latta and its chief power plant engineer W. A. S. Surridge. Also present was the future station superintendent A. Rose. Once the engineers were satisfied that the machine was fit for service, it was connected at 6 pm to the national grid. Due to the reduced head, the machine's output was limited to 30 MW. By the end of the next day generating unit 2 had completed commissioning and was also connected to the system. This allowed the 220 kV line to Islington to be brought into service as two machines were needed to provide sufficient reactive power to charge the long length of line. The third generating unit was commissioned on 18 August 1956 and the fourth unit on 11 December 1956. The power station was officially opened on 3 November 1956 by Stanley Goosman in the presence of 600 invited guests, plus members of the public.

Delivery of the four remaining generating units began late in 1959, with unit 5 being commissioned on 19 April 1961, unit 6 on 18 August 1961, unit 7 on 13 March 1962 and unit 8 on 1 June 1962.

The commissioning of Roxburgh removed the need for power restrictions in the South Island and ensure a surplus of power for many years.

==== Project cost ====
In December 1947 the government expected the project to cost a total of £11.5 million. By September 1949 when the final location and type of dam had been chosen the cost had increased to £17 million.

A contract of £8.6 million was awarded to Hannen, Holland & Cubitts in association with Conrad Zschokke. This was a target estimate contract with a 'no loss clause'. In May 1954 the contract was re-negotiated to include Downer & Co as the principal. The new contract was based upon 'a schedule of rates' at a value of £10.1 million.

The final total cost of the project was £24.1 million of which £19.2 million was for civil engineering, £445,000 on the bulkhead caissons and stage 2 civil works, £4.5 million on the purchase and installation and commissioning of the eight generators and outdoor switchyard. Included in the civil engineering cost was £900,000 for the early completion bonus and £35,900 on expediting the programme.

A total of 3,500 drawings were produced between the Ministry of Works, the State Hydro-Electric Department and contractors to build the power station.

=== Service ===
In December 1965 a generator coil failed on unit 2, followed by a series of further failures between 1971 and 1973, which in an effort to correct, the windings were reversed. Units 1, 3 and 4 had their stators rewound in 1975 to 1976.

The sluice gate No. 3 in 1996 and gate No. 2 in 2001 were modified to enable the power station to pass an increased maximum design flood of 5,700 m^{3}/s (200,000 cu ft/s). Gate No. 1 was also plugged with concrete. To improve the structure's ability to withstand seismic events the original heavy chain and counterweight spillway gate operating system was replaced with a hydraulic system while the dam's top bridge was strengthened and the gantry towers were lowered.

In the 1990s the power station's control systems were automated with new control and protection systems which allowed it to be de-staffed. Control of the power station is now undertaken from a control centre at Clyde Power Station.

==== Ownership changes ====
In 1987 the assets of the NZED (including Roxburgh) were transferred to the Electricity Corporation of New Zealand (ECNZ).

On 1 April 1996 ownership of Roxburgh was transferred from the Electricity Corporation of New Zealand to Contact Energy a State Owned Enterprise which subsequently passed into private ownership in 1999. With the separation of Transpower a new control room was constructed on the former carpark to house the Transpower equipment needed to operate the transmission equipment. The original air blast circuit breakers were replaced with Sprecher & Schuh SF6 circuit breakers in the late 1980s.

==== Generating units ====
The original generator design supplemented the fan pole-generated air flow with through-rotor air flow. During the factory acceptance tests one generator had been subjected to a heat run but in order to keep the windage and friction losses within the allowable 10 percent over the guaranteed value the manufacturer had blocked off the through-rotor flow which reduced air flow in the generator, with the coolers in the closed circuit, to 19.5 m3/s, which was about 90 percent of the design flow. This modification was applied to all of the generators. The limited time taken to commission the generating units had meant that no heat runs were performed, which would have identified the impact of this modification on the stator winding temperatures. As a result, the Roxburgh generators always operated at higher temperatures than most other hydro generators in New Zealand.

The traditional practice over summer to manage the generator temperatures was to open the generator air vents and use modified ducting to discharge the hot air outside the building, while also to open the main powerhouse door and start the extraction fans installed high in the wall at the other end of the machine hall.

In 1995, it was becoming apparent that it was becoming difficult to maintain the stator winding temperatures within their rated 65 to 75 °C operating range when operating at their maximum output over the summer months from January to April. As a result, it was necessary to de-rate the generators from 40 MW to 35 MW. This de-rating limited the station's operational flexibility.

Investigations found that the over-heating of the stator windings was due to a breakdown of the stator winding insulation, thus reducing the heat transfer from the conductors, accumulation of dust and oil on stator winding and heat exchanger surfaces reducing their heat transfer as well as sustained high ambient air and river water temperatures over the summer, compartmentalisation of the powerhouse to manage the fire risk, which reduced airflow through the powerhouse, all compounded by an inefficient generator ventilation system.

In 1997 the practice was begun of no longer opening the air vents over the summer as doing so effectively took one of the eight air coolers within the generator out of the circuit.

Modifications made to address the overheating issue included improving the airflow through the powerhouse, partial return to the original design of through-rotor cooling; changing the way water passes through the cooler and tube fin spacing; changing the core air duct configuration; and making the coolers slightly larger. As a result, the volume of air circulating within the unit has been increased by approximately 28 percent to 25 m3/s. Also steps were taken to improve the airflow though the powerhouse as described below.

Beginning in 2002 a major refurbishment was undertaken on all generating units, which among other works consisted of installing of new stator cores and windings, re-insulating the rotor poles, refurbishing the turbine runner and wicket gates, replacing the wearing ring on the turbine shaft, replacing the stator air coolers, as well as refurbishing where necessary any mechanical components.

==== Fire protection ====
When it was owned by the NZED the power station had been self-insured. Once it was transferred to the a state-owned enterprise ECNZ in the late 1980s it became necessary to obtain commercial insurance coverage. To obtain this insurance it became necessary to mitigate the risk of a station fire. As a result, from the mid-1990s onwards the ECNZ upgraded the fire protection at the station, which to reduce the spread of any smoke or fire included compartmentalisation of the powerhouse into several separate fire zones. This compartmentalisation lead in 1995 to either installing approved fire-stopping, replacing existing doors with fire-rated doors or installing double-sided firewalls with fire-rated doors. Once such barrier was installed between the stator floor and the cable gallery on the downstream side of the powerhouse. All doors were fitted with heavy-duty adjustable closers. Unfortunately this compartmentalisation restricted airflow and caused temperatures over the summer to reach the mid-30s °C on the machine hall floor and the mid-40s °C on the generator floor, peaking around 8 p.m.

To improve the air flow through the powerhouse temporary wedges were used to hold the fire doors open, but this compromised fire security. A permanent solution was implemented in 1999, when the wedges were replaced with electro-magnetic door retainers which combined with automatic door closers which hold the door open, but which in response to a fire alarm or a power failure automatically close the doors. Ventilation of the generator floor was further enhanced in 2002 by installing a ducted fan to import cool air from a dam drainage gallery.

==== Interconnecting transformer ====
In 2012 the original 50 MVA 220/110 kV interconnecting transformer T10 was replaced with a new 150 MVA unit which removed a significant restriction on operating of the Southland 110 kV network. This also removed the station's previous restriction of the 110 kV generation to 90 MW and hence the total station output to 290 MW.

== Design ==
The power station consists of an 1,170-foot-long (360 m), 185-foot-high (56 m) concrete gravity dam from which eight steel penstocks supply water to a powerhouse containing the turbines. The penstocks change from an 18-foot-square (5.5 m) intake section to 18 ft in diameter before tapering to 15 ft (1.4 m) where they enter the scroll case. Three 135 ton (137 tonne) spillway gates supplied by Sir William Arrol & Co. are located on the West (right) side of the dam. The designers anticipated a 500-year flood of 3,400 m^{3}/s (120,000 cu ft/s). As a result, the spillway was designed with a capacity of 4,200 m^{3}/s (150,000 cu ft/s).

At the base of the spillway were three 80 ton (81.3 tonne) low-level sluice gates supplied by Stahlbau of Reinhausen in Germany designed to pass 2,300 m^{3}/s (80,000 cu ft/s). During construction these sluice gates were used to divert the river via a diversion channel. The upstream section of the diversion channel was unlined and followed an old natural channel of the river before reaching the spillway and sluice gate block which is curved at the exit to direct water away from the outdoor switchyard. The surfaces were finished to a high standard to ensure a smooth flow of the water during medium and high flows. One sluice gate was subsequently plugged with concrete leaving only sluice gates No. 2 and No. 3 in service.

=== Powerhouse ===
The superstructure of the powerhouse is constructed of welded steel framed clad in precast concrete panels. Two 118 ton (120 tonne) overhead cranes manufactured by Sir William Arrol & Co run over the full length of the powerhouse, including the unloading bay.

The main generating equipment arranged on three floors: the main floor at 306.5 ft (93.4 m), the generator floor at 297 ft (91 m), and the turbine floor at 287 ft (87 m) with cable galleries on the downstream side that run the length of the building. The choice of the level of the main floor was governed by the dimensions of the turbine and generator. However, as this level is below the maximum possible flood level estimated at the time of the design to be at 315 ft (96 m) it was the powerhouse and the workshop were made watertight up to this level. As a result, the windows are set high and the doors are at the 318 ft (97 m) level.

Open to the machine hall but raised approximately three metres above the main floor at the western end of the powerhouse is the unloading bay underneath of which is the 400 V switchgear at main floor level and below them is the auxiliary generating sets on the generator floor.

The lowest level is the drainage gallery at 257 ft (78 m)which runs the whole length of the powerhouse and gives access to the draft tubes.

The generator transformers are located outdoors on a platform above the tailrace at 318 ft (97 m).

=== Generating units ===
Each spillway drives a Francis turbine supplied by Dominion Engineering of Canada. The turbines have a nominal speed of 136.4 rpm with a guaranteed maximum runaway speed of 252 rpm. The turbines have a rated output of 56,000 hp at a net head of 148 ft (13.7 m), which consume 101.2 m^{3}/s (3,575 cu ft/s) of water at full load. The runners weigh 28 tons and have a diameter of 12 ft 10 inches (1.2 m). The speed of the each turbine is controlled by a Woodward supplied governor located on the generator floor. The generating unit are located 50 ft (15 m) apart between centres. Each turbine is directly connected to a dedicated to a 44 pole 11 kV synchronous generator supplied by British Thomson-Houston (BTH). Each generator has an output of 44.44 MVA at a power factor of 0.9 and a total weight of 362 tons with the rotor weighing185 tons. The generators are each enclosed in thick-walled octagonal concrete housing, each with a makeup air intake located in each upstream corner. The generators are air cooled by fans on the top and bottom of the rotor circulating air, while water cooled radiators located each corner of the generator pit removed heat from the air.

The output of the each generating unit is connected to three single phase generator transformers half of which were supplied by Ferranti and the remainder by Canadian General Electric. All had two equal secondary windings which allowed them to be configured to provide either 110 kV or 220 kV. Generating units 1 to 5 are connected to the 220 kV system and units 6 to 8 to the 110 kV system. The transformers are located on a platform above the draft tube. Each transformer weighs 59 tons when fill of oil. From the transformers overhead conductors carried the power across the tailrace to an outdoor switchyard.

The generating units were delivered with guaranteed efficiencies of 92.2% at three quarters load turbines, 97.36% at three quarters load and 97.67% at full load with a combined efficiency of 89.77% at three quarters load.

The 110 kV and 220 kV systems were connected by a 50 MVA 220/110 kV interconnecting transformer supplied by Brown Boveri. The outdoor 220 kV and 110 kV circuit breakers were also supplied by Brown Boveri and were of the air blast type.

=== Auxiliary power supply ===
To ensure a reliable auxiliary to the power station two auxiliary generating units were installed below the unloading bay and supplied from a shared 3 ft (0.27 m) diameter 243 ft (22.6 m) long penstock which ran from the top of the dam. Each unit has a horizontal Francis 765 hp turbine supplied by Drees & Co of West Germany which drove via flywheel a 625 kVA 400 V generator supplied by General Electric. At full load each unit consumes 0.165 m^{3}/s (5.82 cu ft/s) of water.

The auxiliary generating units were upgraded at a cost of NZ$2.5 to $3 million in 2017.

=== Lake Roxburgh ===
Lake Roxburgh, the lake formed behind the dam, extends for nearly 30 kilometres (19 mi) towards the town of Alexandra.

== Operation ==
Operation of the power station is covered by the requirements of six resource consents that expire in 2042. These require a minimum discharge of 250 m^{3}/s (8,800 cu ft/s) from the power station.

With the commissioning of Roxburgh, the sediment which had previously flowed down the Clutha river became trapped behind the dam. Regular surveys commenced in 1961 to monitor this sediment. By 1979 the average river bed level downstream of the Alexandra bridge has increased by 3.6 metres since the lake was created in 1956. The completion of the Clyde Power Station in 1992 reduced the sediment inflows from the Clutha River, leaving the Manuherikia River as the principal source. Floods in 1979, 1987, 1994 and 1995 have led many residents of Alexandra to put pressure on the owners of Roxburgh power station to better manage the sediment build-up. A major flood in 1999 caused flooding of large parts of the main business area of Alexandra. This led to Contact Energy and the government purchasing flood affected properties and flood easements over others as well as constructing a flood bank. Contact Energy has also introduced a program of drawing down the lake level during floods in an attempt to move flush sediment downstream.

Between 1956 and 1979 the maximum operating level of Lake Roxburgh had been 132.6 m before being reduced to 132 m. In December 2009 Contact Energy was given permission by the Otago Regional Council to return to a maximum operating level of 132.6 m. This would increase the amount of electricity that the power station could generate. When Contact Energy's application was heard in October 2009 14 submissions were received on the application, eight in opposition, five in support and one neutral. The approval of an increased operating level came with the conditions to ensure that the power station's discharge flow matched naturally occurring flood flows. When the flow reaches 700 m^{3}/s (25,000 cu ft/s), the level of Lake Roxburgh has to be lowered to below 132 m, by either releasing less water at Clyde Power Station or increasing the flow through Roxburgh power station. Other conditions addressed mitigating the effects on amenity areas and walking track as well as the protocols to be followed if historic artefacts are found.

Since 2012 a trap and transfer programme and transported elvers (juvenile eels) around the power station. 2016 report

== Gallery ==
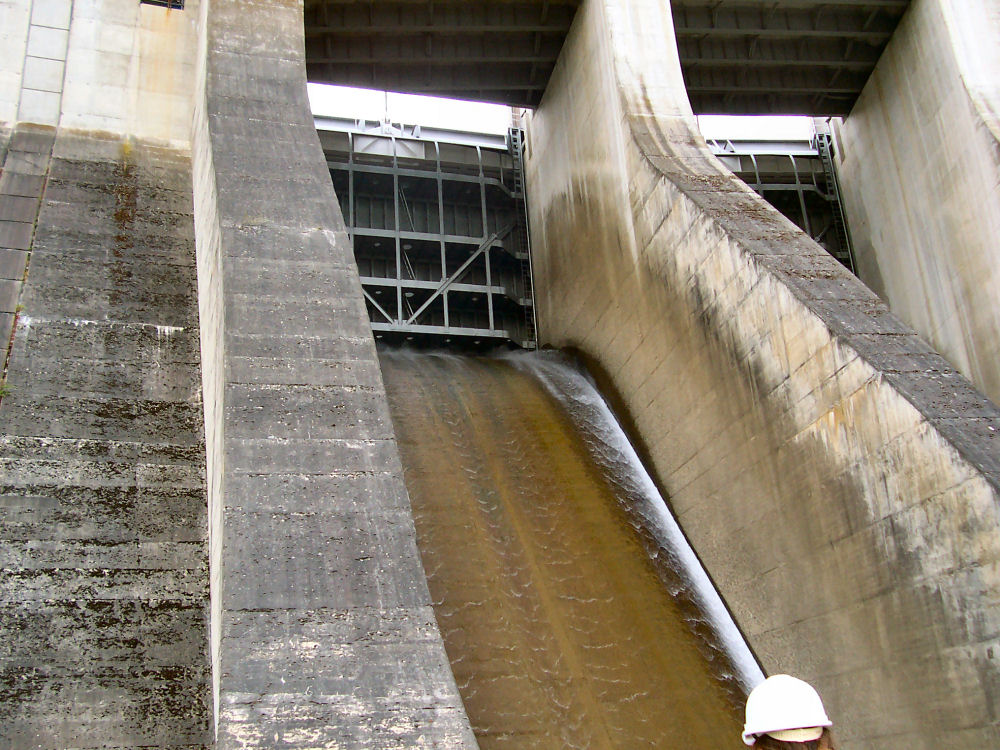
Spillway

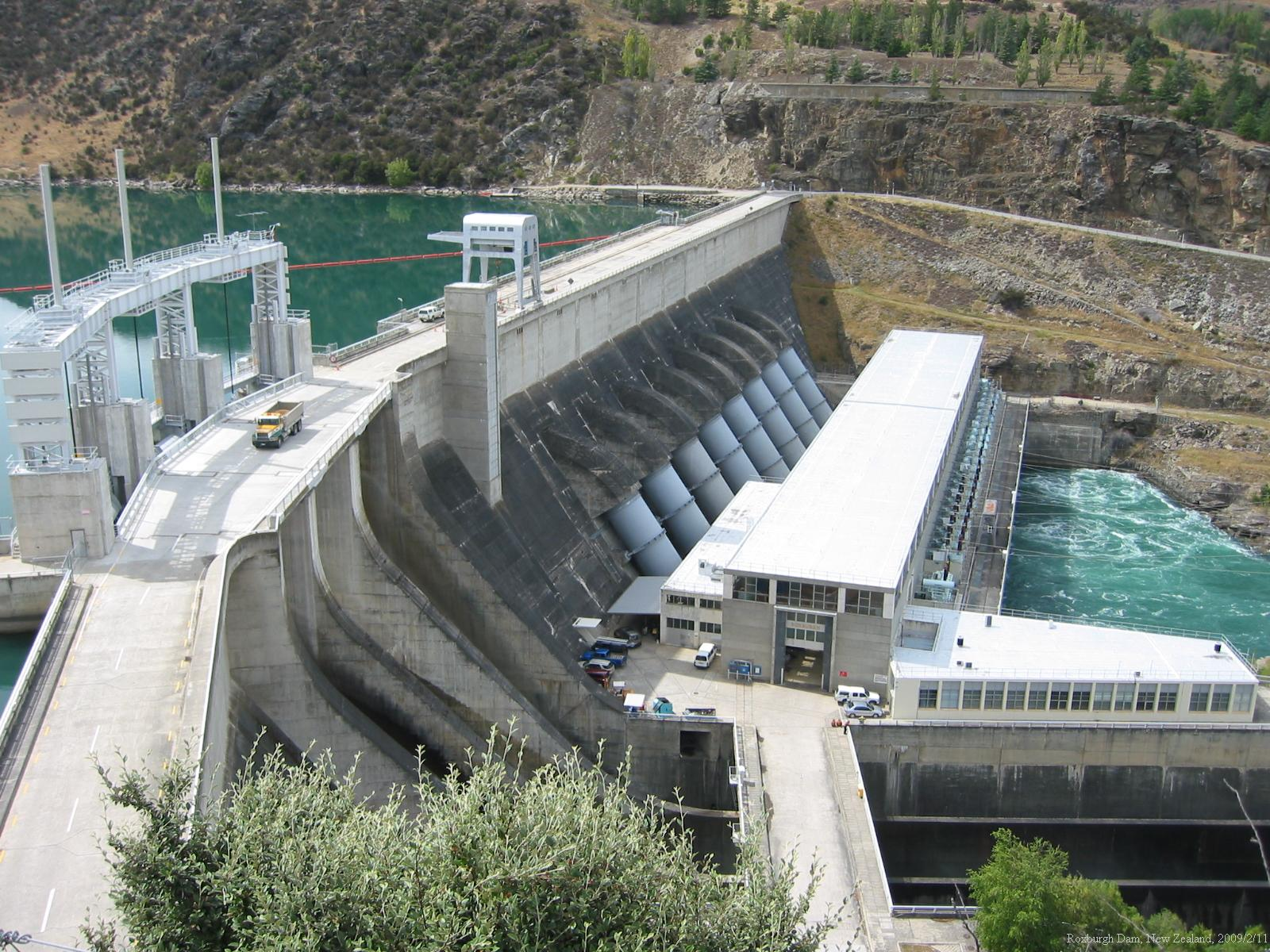
Outdoor view, clearly showing the eight penstocks

== See also ==
- List of power stations in New Zealand
- Electricity sector in New Zealand
