= Waiwera River (Otago) =

Location
- Country: New Zealand

Physical characteristics
- Mouth: Clutha River / Mata-Au
  - coordinates: 46.1531°S 169.5687°E

The Waiwera River is a tributary of the Clutha River / Mata-Au in New Zealand.

== See also ==
- List of rivers of New Zealand
