= Hāwea River =

Coordinates: 44°37′S 169°15′E

Location
- Country: New Zealand

The Hāwea River is a river of New Zealand, draining Lake Hāwea into the Clutha/Matau-au.

The river's flow is set by the Lake Hawea Control Dam, an earth embankment 30m high and 390m long that enables water to be released when wanted for the Clyde Dam further downstream.

== See also ==
- List of rivers of New Zealand
