= Spotted skink =

There are three species of skink named spotted skink:

- Carinascincus ocellatus, native to Tasmania
- Flexiseps melanurus, native to Madagascar
- Eutropis madaraszi, native to Sri Lanka
