= Clutha River =

River in the South Island of New Zealand

Clutha River / Mata-Au Molyneux
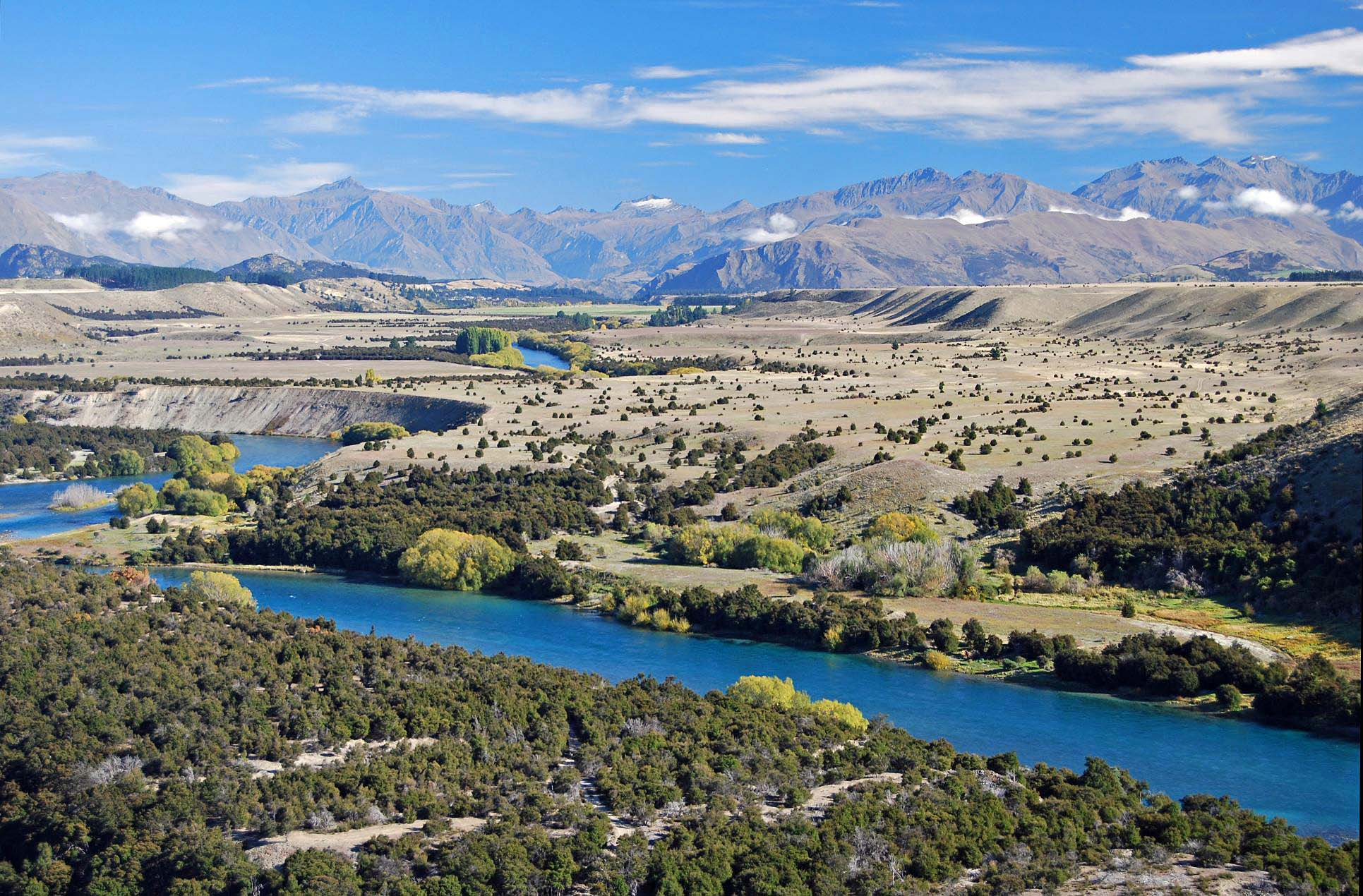
- Upper Clutha Valley, looking upriver toward the Southern Alps

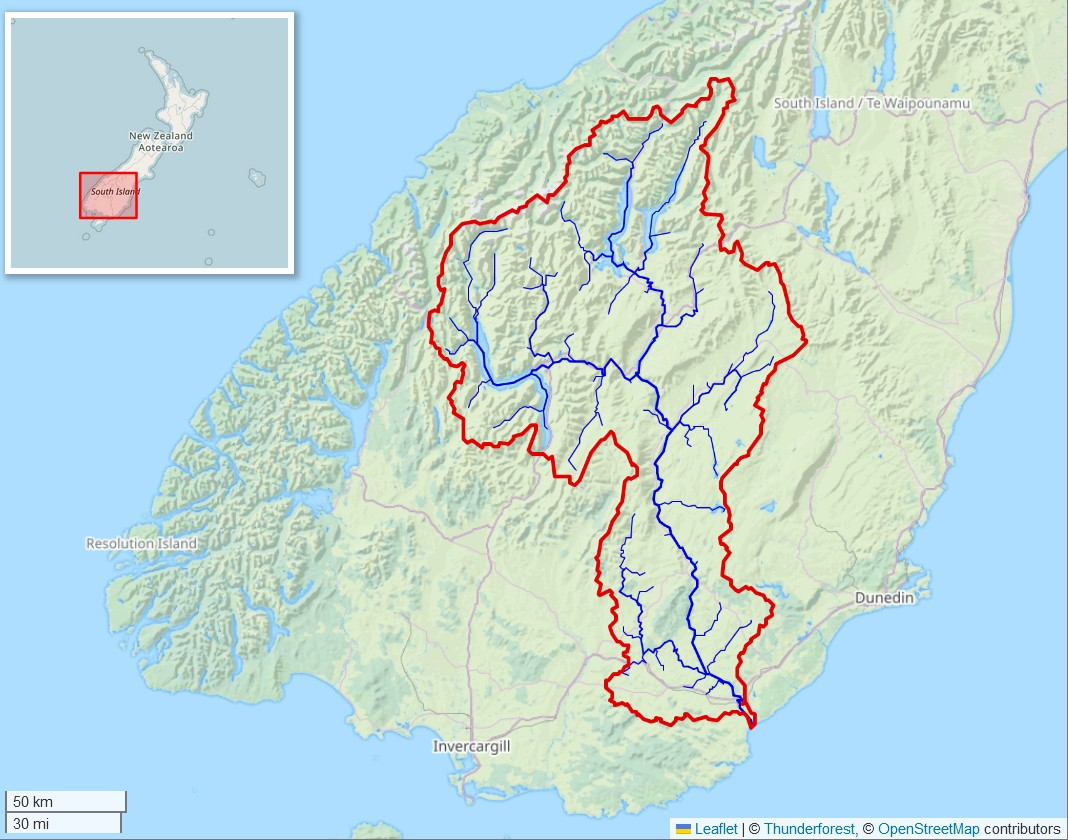
- Clutha River basin (Interactive map)
- Etymology: Mata-au: current in the water. Clutha: from Cluaidh, the Scots Gaelic name for the River Clyde
- Native name: Mata-Au (Māori)

Location
- Country: New Zealand
- Region: Otago
- Settlements: Wānaka, Cromwell, Clyde, Alexandra, Roxburgh, Balclutha

Physical characteristics
- Source: Mount Brewster
  - location: Southern Alps
  - elevation: 1,540 metres (5,050 ft)
- Mouth: Pacific Ocean
  - coordinates: 46°21′S 169°48′E
  - elevation: Sea level
- Length: 338 km (210 mi)
- Basin size: c. 21,000 km^{2} (8,100 sq mi)
- Discharge
  - average: 614 m^{3}/s (21,700 cu ft/s)

Basin features
- Progression: Makarora River → Lake Wānaka → Clutha River → Pacific Ocean
- Tributaries
  - left: Hāwea River, Lindis River, Manuherikia River, Beaumont River, Tuapeka River
  - right: Cardrona River, Kawarau River, Pomahaka River, Waiwera River
- Waterbodies: Lake Wānaka, Lake Dunstan, Lake Roxburgh
- Islands: Inch Clutha

The Clutha River / Mata-Au is the second longest river in New Zealand and the longest in the South Island. It flows south-southeast 338 kilometres (210 mi) through Central and South Otago from Lake Wānaka in the Southern Alps to the Pacific Ocean, 75 kilometres (47 mi) south west of Dunedin. Gold is in abundance in the Clutha River and its surrounding areas. It is the highest volume river in New Zealand, and has a discharging mean flow of 614 cubic metres per second (21,700 cu ft/s).

The Clutha River played a prominent role in both the Māori and European history of the area. Rivers and valleys were the main transport system used by local Māori to access the interior of the South Island. The 1860s Otago gold rush resulted in the production of approximately 240 tonnes of gold, which was found in the Clutha catchment. It has the biggest catchment and outflow in New Zealand. About 6% of all water in the South Island is discharged by the Clutha River alone. It has a mean discharge of approximately 500 m^{3} (18,000 cu ft) and a catchment area of around 22,000 km^{2} (8,500 sq mi) and is an economically significant river for the country. The Clutha River encompasses two hydropower stations, which provide 14% of the country's hydropower generation capacity.

The Clutha River drains the high mountains of the Southern Alps in the west and passes through a complex topographic system of basins and ranges towards the east before reaching into the Pacific Ocean. A majority of the topographical features of the Clutha River catchment area are a direct result of the late Cenozoic and active tectonic processes that are occurring in southern South Island due to deformation along the nearby plate boundary, defined by the Alpine Fault.

The river is known for its scenery, gold-rush history, and swift turquoise waters. A river conservation group, the Clutha Mata-Au River Parkway Group, is working to establish a regional river parkway, with a trail, along the entire river corridor.

== Toponomy ==
The Māori name for the Clutha River is the Mata-Au (sometimes shortened to Matau), meaning 'surface current'. Early settlers sometimes spelled the Māori name as "Matou" and "Matua-a", and pronounced it "Mattoo". Māori also referred to the Clutha River as Maranuku. The name Matau is widely used to refer to one of the two distributaries of the Clutha close to its mouth (the other is the Koau).

The first appearance of a European name for the Clutha River / Mata-Au was the Molyneux River (/mɒlɪnˌəʊ/); its mouth was named by Captain James Cook after his sailing master, Robert Molineux. The name is also applied to the small settlement of Port Molyneux. Early maps show Moulineux Harbour in its original spelling, but later maps indicate the harbour's name was written as "Molyneux", rather than "Moulineux". (Note: Early maps published by Europeans showed the spelling "Moulineux". By the 1840s, it was spelled "Molyneux".)

The river is now commonly known as the Clutha, which comes from Cluaidh, the Scots Gaelic name for the River Clyde in Scotland, which runs through Glasgow.

The official name for the river has been Clutha River / Mata-au since the Ngāi Tahu Claims Settlement Act 1998, a landmark Treaty of Waitangi settlement, which added dual names to approximately 90 geographic features throughout the South Island to recognise the "equal and special significance" of both the English and Māori names.

== History ==
=== Māori history ===
Māori occupation of the Otago Region began in c. 1250–1300. Māori learned to hunt the numerous species of moa and burned many of the inland forests. The first iwi in Otago were Waitaha, then Kāti Māmoe; later came Kāi Tahu. By the end of the fourteenth century, the environment in Otago and Southland (Murihuku) had begun to shift, with podocarp woods retreating and the moa population declining. A few Māori settlements in the region started to lose importance, although several settlements still existed in Central Otago. Several locations along the Clutha River retain the names of Kāti Māmoe chiefs, such as, Taumata-o-Te-Hau, a hill on the north side of the Clutha River, above Balclutha, named after the chief who climbed there and watched for the arrival of a taua for whom he had prepared a trap. Historically, Kāi Tahu travelled upstream the Clutha River to fish for eels and hunt waterfowl. Kāi Tahu used to travel in to the interior of the South Island almost every year and had campsites and burial sites along the Clutha River and its nearby lakes.

The mouth of Mata-au was heavily populated, with many permanent and temporary Kāi Tahu settlements throughout the lower stretches of the river. Murikauhaka, a settlement near the mouth of the Mata-au, was at one stage home to an estimated two hundred people. Māori trading groups used the Cromwell Gorge as the main thoroughfare to their pounamu and moa-hunting expeditions to the interior of Otago.

Many early Māori archaeological sites have been found in the Cromwell Gorge, featuring moa eggshell fragments. Unlike other Central Otago sites, no burned bones have been found.

=== European history ===
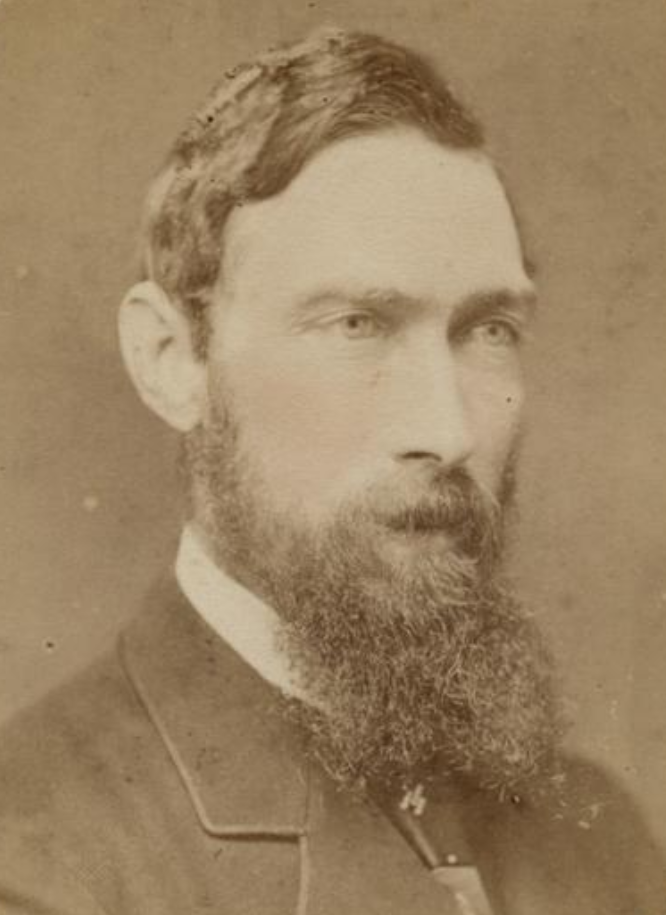
Watson Shennan an early settler of Central Otago (1866)

During early European settlement in the South Island, a whaling station was established close to the Clutha River's mouth at Port Molyneux, and during this period the sea was the source of almost all of the area's economy. The town of Port Molyneux, located on this bay, was a busy harbour during the 19th century. Its location at the mouth of the Clutha made it a good site for trade, both from the interior and for coastal and ocean-going shipping. A major flood in 1878 shifted the mouth of the Clutha to the north and silted up the port, after which the town gradually dwindled.

The first European to visit the Upper Clutha area and to see the inland lakes of Wakatipu, Wānaka and Hāwea was Nathanael Chalmers, who was guided by Chiefs Reko and Kaikōura in 1853. They returned him down the river on a mōkihi, a flax reed open kayak, that they built from flax stems and raupō from the shores of Lake Hāwea. In 1910, 57 years after the event, Nathanael Chalmers remembered his boat trip through the Cromwell Gorge: "I shall never forget the "race" through the gorge ... my heart was literally in my mouth, but those two old men seemed to care nothing for the current."

European "sheepmen" arrived later in the late 1850s, searching for grazing grounds in Otago's interior. Alexander and Watson Shennan set off from Milton (known previously as Tokomairiro) in December 1857 to Central Otago, looking for land to raise sheep. The brothers proceeded farther than the runholders who had previously acquired territory up to the Waitāhuna River. When they returned to Dunedin after spending several days exploring the Manuherikia Valley, they submitted an application to the Otago Provincial Government to lease two blocks of land on either side of the Manuherikia River. The total land area was 100,000 acres (40,000 hectares). They brought sheep to the district in 1858. Watson Shennan described the area as "well grassed and watered, a very land of promise" which attracted others to the region.

In 1862, gold-rich bars of rocks and gravel were discovered by Christopher Reilly and Horatio Hartley during their winter 1862 expedition up Cromwell Gorge through the waters of the Clutha. They arrived in Dunedin on 15 August, 1862, deposited their 100 oz (2,800 g) of gold, and were rewarded with £2,000.

=== Gold rush ===
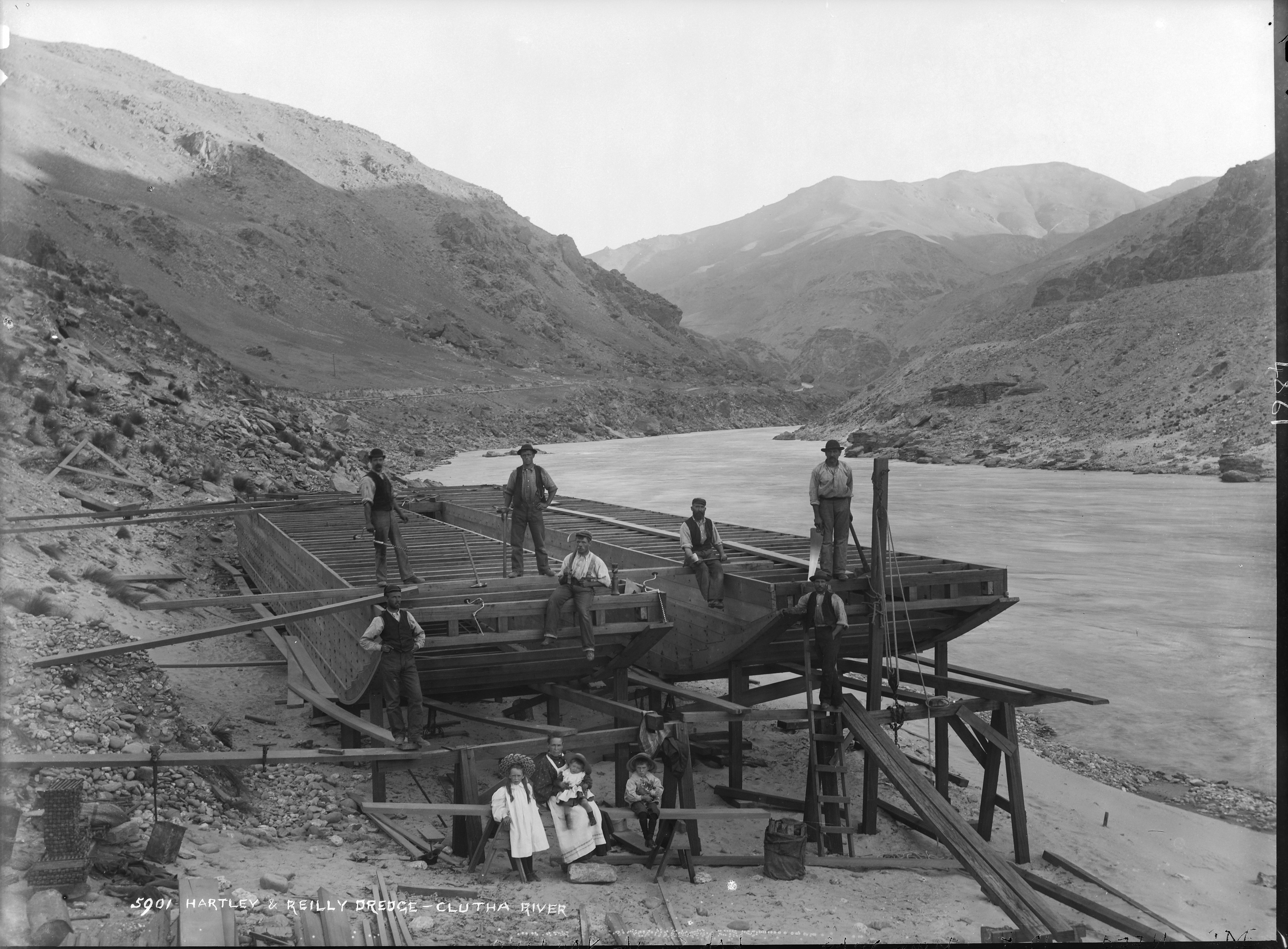
Construction of a dredge in the Cromwell Gorge (1890s)

A gold rush began in Central Otago in the 1860s. With several settlements quickly established along gold-rich rivers such as the Clutha and Kawarau, the rush to Central Otago was the largest in the region's history. A large number of miners' huts also existed during this era along the Clutha River. Roxburgh Gorge had a majority of the huts of this type, but they also occurred in Cromwell Gorge. A 1980 archaeological survey in the Roxburgh Gorge indicated a number of 32 huts and 79 rock shelters present in the area.

Around 100 dredges have operated at various times during the area's history in the river bed and nearby gravels, including the present-day gorge to the east of the Old Man Range. The Clutha River and its tributary Kawarau transported alluvial gold across a distance of 200 km (120 mi) in river bed load. A Middle Pleistocene-age ancestral Clutha River delivered detrital gold across the lower parts of what is presently the Manuherikia Valley near Alexandra.

By Christmas 1861, 14,000 prospectors were on the Tuapeka and Waipori fields. The gold rush was short-lived, with most of the alluvial gold played out by 1863, but prospectors continued to arrive, swelling to a maximum of 18,000 miners in February 1864.

Mining in the Clutha River upstream from Cromwell became significant after 1900, when the area's potential was gradually recognised. Previously, the Kawarau River and the Clutha River running downstream from Cromwell were the primary focus. Māori were aware of gold in the Clutha River but they did not value it.

== Geography ==
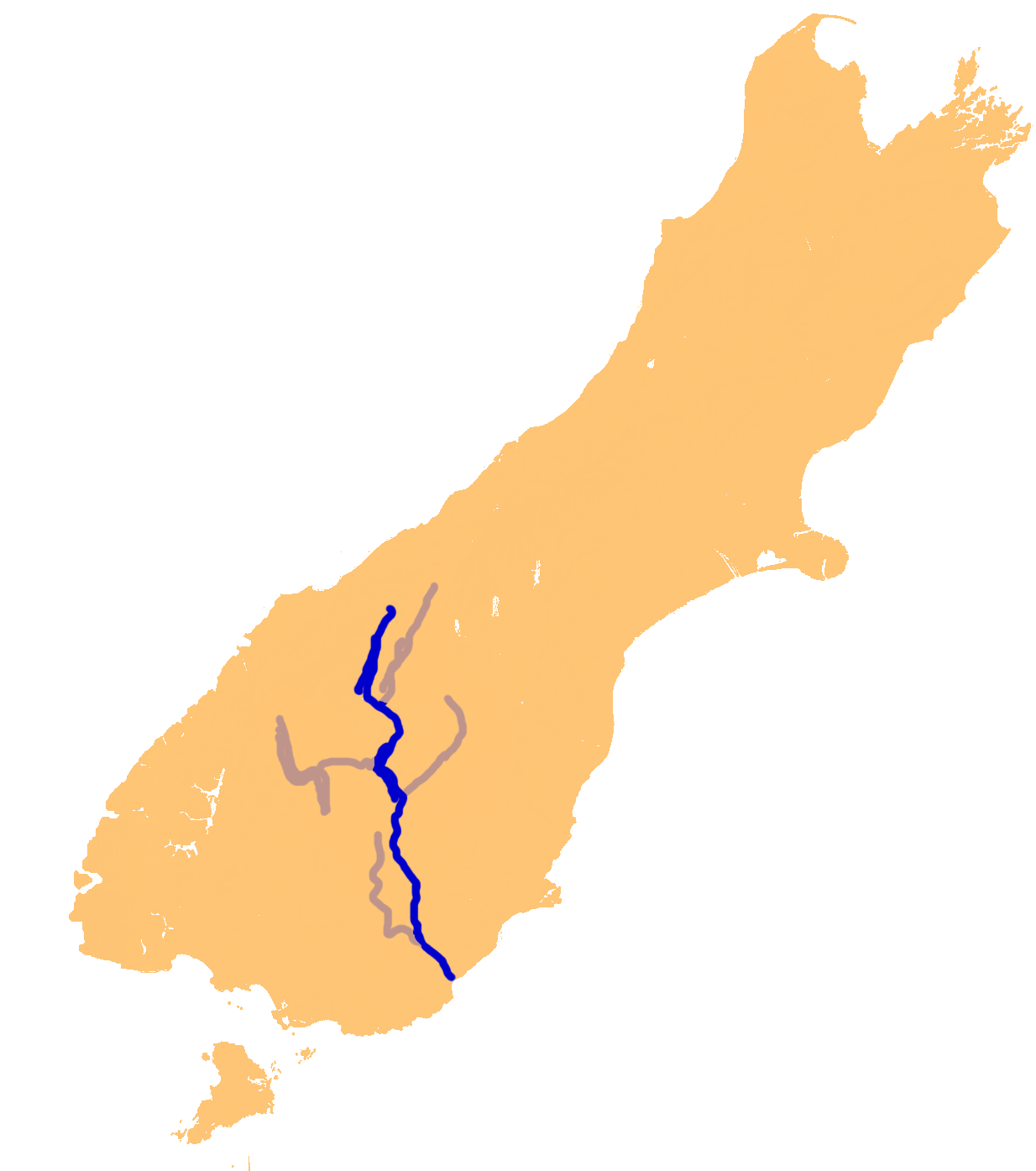
Location of the Clutha River and its catchment in the South Island

The Clutha River is the South Island's largest river and has the largest catchment and outflow in New Zealand. About 6% of all water in the South Island is discharged through Clutha River alone. It has a mean discharge of approximately 500 m^{3} (18,000 cu ft), a catchment area of around 22,000 km^{2} (8,500 sq mi), and a length of about 340 km (210 mi), which makes it one of the longest rivers in New Zealand. The major tributaries include the Arrow River, Cardrona River, Lindis River, Manuherikia River, Teviot River, Pomahaka River, and the Waitāhuna River. Towns near the Clutha River include Alexandra, New Zealand, Balclutha, Cromwell, Roxburgh, and Wānaka.

=== Course ===
The Clutha River extends about 340 km (210 mi), flowing roughly north to south through the Otago Region. The Clutha River's headwaters are located in the Southern Alps, receiving up to 8,000 mm (310 in) of precipitation annually from the west and north west. The Clutha River and its tributaries receive water from three lakes in Otago, Hāwea, Wakatipu, and Wānaka, along with its minor tributaries Arrow, Beaumont, Lindis, Manuherikia, Nevis, Shotover, Talla Burn, Teviot, and Pomahaka. The Clutha River may have taken its current course due to glacial advances in the middle to late-Pleistocene, advances that nearly reached Cromwell. It is an economically significant river for the country. The Clutha River encompasses two hydropower stations, which provide 14% of the country's hydropower generation capacity.

=== Catchment ===
It drains the largest catchment in New Zealand, which is about 22,000 km^{2} (8,500 sq mi) in size, and has an area normalised flow of about 800 mm (31 in). It has an average annual discharge of 530 m^{3} (19,000 cu ft). (Note: Its catchment area size may differ between high-quality sources. Murray 1975 mentions 22,000 km^{2} (8,500 sq mi). However, Redpath, Sirguey & Cullen 2019 mentions 20,800 km^{2} (8,000 sq mi). For now, this article will rely on Murray, 1975.) Due to long-standing hydroelectricity commitments and increasing demands for urban water supply and irrigation for horticulture and agriculture, meeting the Clutha Catchment's rapidly expanding water needs will become more challenging in the future. Located at a maximum elevation of approximately 2,800 m (9,200 ft) on the Main Divide of the Southern Alps, the majority of the river's headwater flows originate from the melting of alpine snow cover and rainfall, with glaciers contributing a minor amount.

In inland basins, annual precipitation totals can be less than 400 mm (16 in), while on the western edge of the catchment, they can surpass 4,000 mm (160 in). The contribution of snowmelt to the annual streamflow of the Clutha River is estimated to be 10% by the time it reaches the Southern Pacific Ocean. This proportion is considerably higher for alpine sub-catchments and large inland basins, rising as high as 30% to 50%. A number of large tributaries originate in Central Otago's semi-arid basins, where yearly precipitation can be as low as 400 mm (16 in), which is an order of magnitude lower than on the Main Divide.

The mean flow of the Clutha is around 614 cubic metres per second (21,700 cu ft/s), comparable to many much larger rivers. This heavy flow, combined with the relatively small size of the river in global terms, makes the Clutha notoriously fast-flowing. It is often listed as one of the world's most swiftly flowing rivers, alongside Australia's Macleay and Fitzroy Rivers, the Amazon and Atrato Rivers in South America, and the Teesta River in the Himalayas. The highest recorded flow on the Clutha was during heavy storms in 1978, peaking at 4,581 cubic metres per second (161,800 cu ft/s).

== Ecology ==
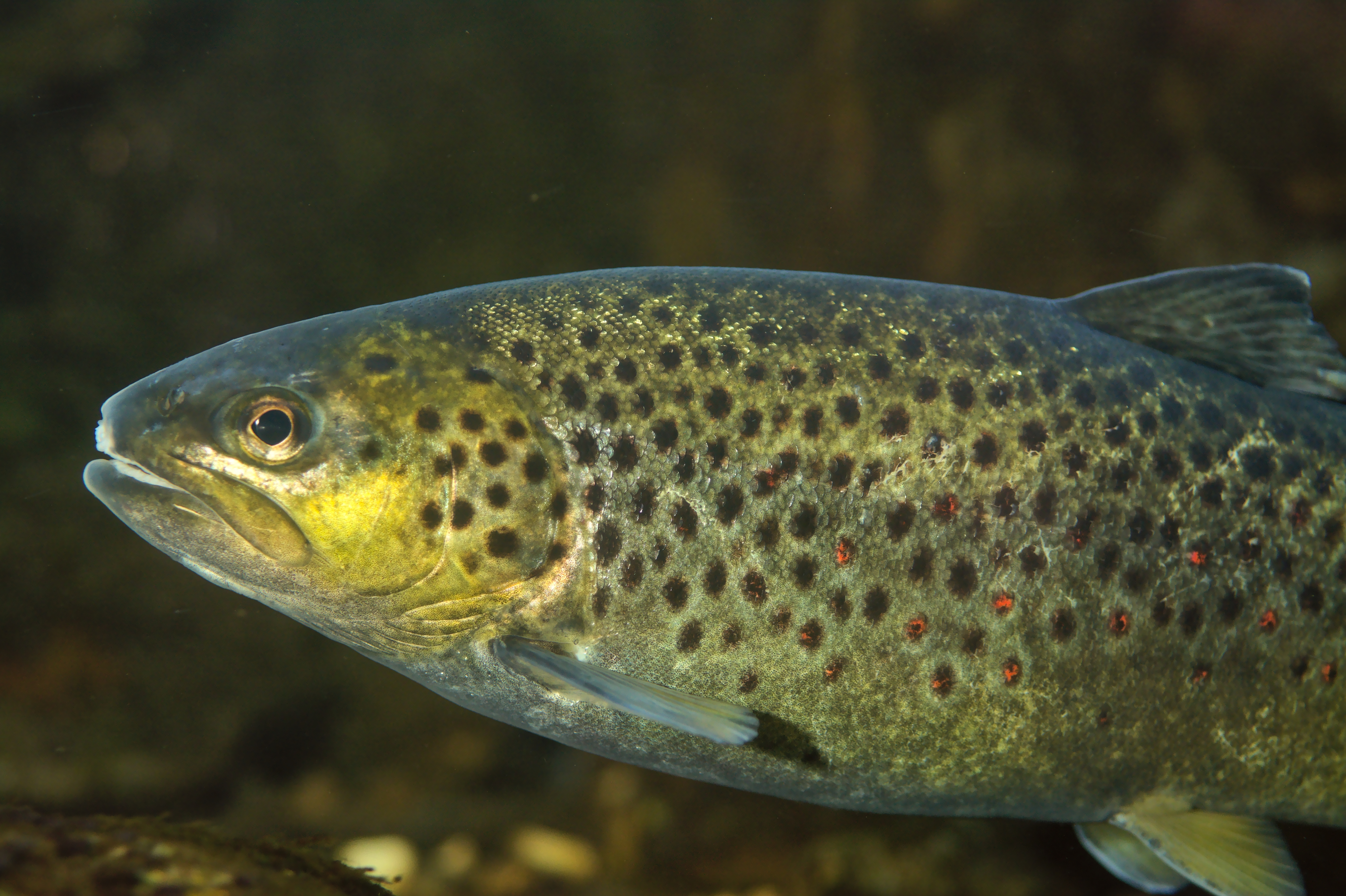
Brown trout are found all-over the Clutha River and its nearby streams

A 2022 report on Clutha freshwater fishes below Roxburgh by the National Institute of Water and Atmospheric Research (NIWA) documented 14 species of native fish, 11 of which are diadromous (including the giant kōkopu and kōaro), meaning that they have marine migratory phases. Additionally, the Clutha River has an unusually high diversity of non-migratory fish species in its tributaries. Brown trout are the most encountered fish in the Clutha River, occurring throughout the main river, streams, and nearby lakes. Rainbow trout also appear in the river but in smaller numbers, and they are more common in the lower section of the river compared to the upper stretches.

At the minimum, nine species of freshwater-limited Galaxias have been identified in the Clutha River by genetics and morphology. These include range-limited species endemic to particular tributaries such as the Nevis River and Teviot River subcatchments, and an alpine galaxias taxon unique to the upper Manuherikia catchment. A Nationally Critical species of Galaxias called "Clutha flathead species D" occurs in various parts of the catchment. A 2022 University of Otago genetic study published in the journal Diversity and Distributions revealed that the river is home to a diverse range of Galaxias vulgaris clades; its diversity is likely a reflection of the Clutha River's complex geological processes. The study emphasises the importance of the genome-wide methods to identify species and understand biodiversity in freshwater ecosystems and conservation in the Clutha River.

Before the construction of Roxburgh Dam, salmon could be found traversing the length of the Clutha River and spawning as far upstream as Lakes Hāwea and Wānaka. The Clutha is the southernmost recognised salmon river; salmon continue to arrive each spring and summer, though numbers have decreased since the construction of Roxburgh Dam. Common bullies, smelt, and perch are also found in the river.

A 1981 assessment of the river by the Upper Clutha Valley Development with the Ministry of Works and Development emphasised the high-quality waters of the river and very low levels of phytoplankton biomasses present.

== Floods ==
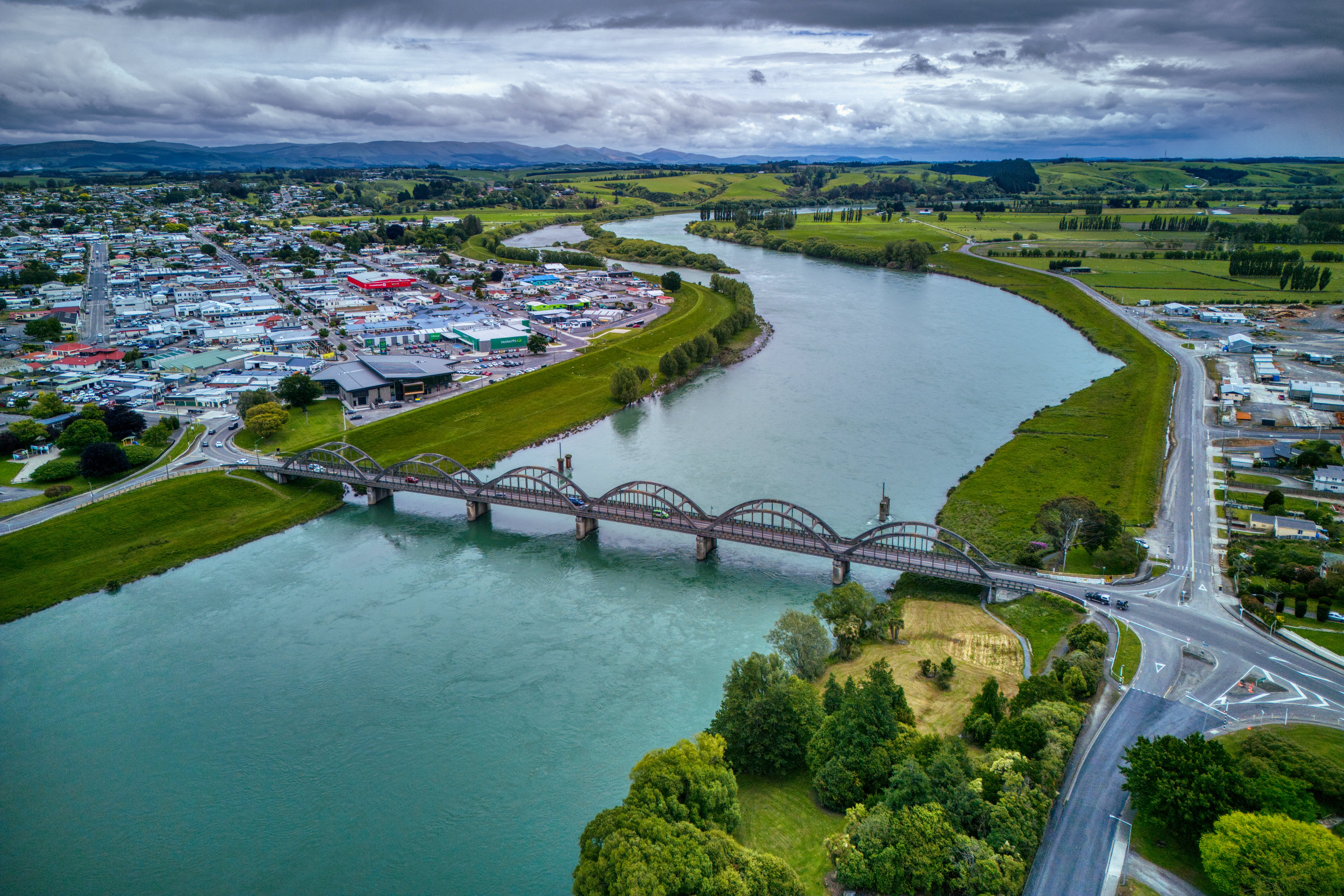
The Clutha passes under the third Balclutha Road Bridge. The first bridge at this site was destroyed during the flood of 1878.

Several major floods have occurred on the Clutha, most notably the "Hundred year floods" of October 1878 and October 1978. During the October 1878 flood, snow from the Southern Alps began to melt and the river started to rise. Central Otago experienced widespread flooding and farm buildings were submerged to their rooftops while rivers filled with dead horses and sheep, timber from farms and mine workings, and trees with a diameter of 1 m (3 ft 3 in). A bridge in Clyde collapsed on 29 September, and its wreckage floated down to Roxburgh, where it struck a bridge there. The bridges at Bannockburn, Beaumont and Roxbrugh were swept away. As a result, this caused significant damage downstream. Over 21,000 livestock were lost when waters flooded over 12,000 h (43,000 ks). The Balclutha Bridge collapsed on 13 October.

The 1978 flood breached the banks of rivers from the Ōreti in the south to the Tokomairaro. Over 12,000 hectares (30,000 acres) of land was inundated, with the loss of over 21,000 livestock. Towns and areas affected stretched from Makarora in the north to Invercargill in the south. The town of Wyndham was completely evacuated, and the towns of Balclutha, Milton and Mataura were seriously affected with many residents moved. The small settlement of Kelso on the banks of the Pomahaka River was completely abandoned and was not rebuilt once the waters subsided. At its peak, on 15 October, the Clutha's flow was measured at just over 4,500 cubic metres per second (160,000 cu ft/s).

A major flood in November 1999 seriously damaged river communities, especially Alexandra. The flooding in Alexandra was attributed to a rise in the riverbed resulting from silt loading in the Roxburgh reservoir behind the Roxburgh Dam, downriver from the town. The 1999 flood had significantly higher water levels in Alexandra than the 1878 flood, despite being only 80% of the volume of the latter.

== Dams ==
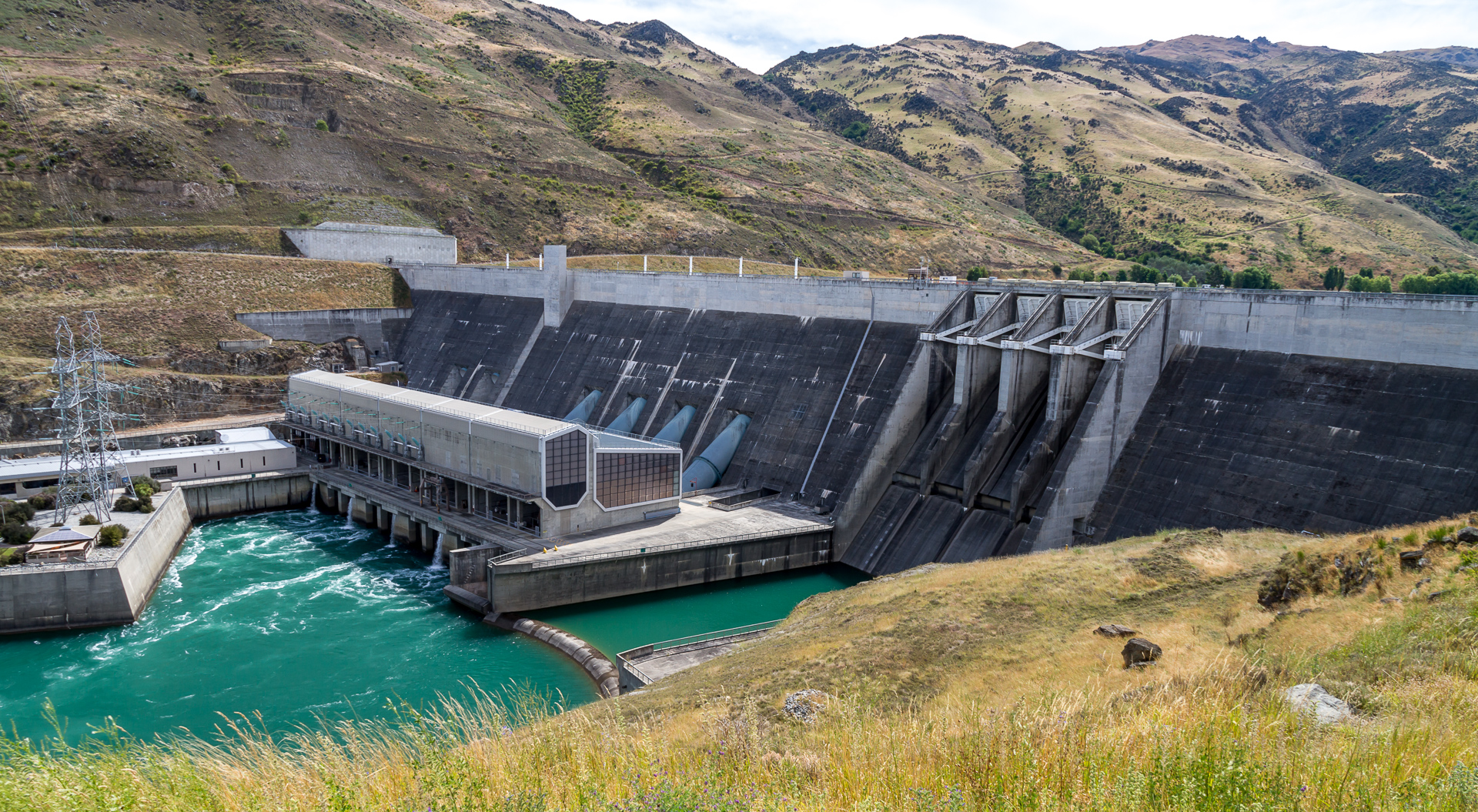
The Clyde Dam (2019)

There are two hydroelectric power stations on the Clutha River, the 464MW Clyde Dam and the 320MW Roxburgh Dam, which together provide about 22% of the South Island's hydroelectric power supply to the New Zealand power grid.

The Clutha River's first dam was the Nil Desperandum Dam in the Upper Clutha Valley, existing from 1864–66. The Roxburgh Dam was the first substantial dam in the South Island. Construction on the dam began in 1949. Four turbines were installed in 1956–57 and four more in 1960–61. Its installed capacity is 320MW.

Construction began on the Clyde Dam in 1982 and was completed in 1993. It was a somewhat controversial project, with opposition and criticism from environmentalists and local residents. Completion of the Clyde Dam took much longer than expected, at a final cost more than 45% higher than the first estimate. The Clyde Dam was one of Robert Muldoon's and the Third National Government's "Think Big" projects, an interventionist state economic strategy. Several Local Authorities along the Clutha River use it as a source for treatment plants to provide communities with potable water.

Further dam projects have been proposed for the river, but as of 2012, all have been cancelled.

== Recreation ==
The Clutha provides irrigation for stone fruit orchards and vineyards around Cromwell, Alexandra, and Roxburgh, which grow apples, apricots, nectarines, cherries, peaches and grapes. There are more vineyards in the upper reaches of the river at Bannockburn, Bendigo, Tarras and Wānaka.

== See also ==
- Rivers of New Zealand
- List of rivers of New Zealand by length

== Works cited ==
- Buckingham, R.; Jones, John-Hall (1985). The Catlins. Invercargill: Craig Printing Company. ISBN 0477057586.
- Waite, Fred (1940). Port Molyneux: The Story of Maori and Pakeha in South Otago – a Centennial history. Clutha County Council – via New Zealand Electronic Text Collection.
- Taylor, W.A (1952). Lore and history of the South Island Māori. Christchurch: Bascands – via New Zealand Electronic Text Collection.
- Beattie, J.H. (1945). Maori Lore of Lake, Alp and Fiord. Dunedin, New Zealand: Otago Daily Times and Witness Newspapers Company Ltd.
- Temple, Phillip (1985). New Zealand Explorers: Great Journeys of Discovery. Christchurch, New Zealand: Whitcoulls. ISBN 9780723307433.
- Olssen, Erik (1984). A History of Otago. Dunedin, New Zealand: J. McIndoe Ltd. ISBN 9780868680583.'
- Laytham, Pamela (1995). The Cromwell Gorge An Historical Guide. Cromwell, New Zealand: Cromwell and Districts Promotion Group and Rogan McIndoe Print Ltd.
- Joyce, Lousie (2012). Gold Rush Central Otago 1862. Clyde, New Zealand: Promote Dunstan Inc. ISBN 978-0473201715.
