= Bendigo Goldfields =

- Bendigo Goldfields, New Zealand

Location
- Location: Bendigo, Central Otago, New Zealand; 44°55′30″S 169°20′30″E

Production
- Products: Gold, minor scheelite
- Production: >28,700 t oz (893 kg)
- Type: alluvial, underground

History
- Discovered: 1862
- Opened: 1862
- Active: 1862-1913, 1933-1942

The Bendigo Goldfields region of Central Otago is an historic area comprising several former mining settlements in the southern South Island of New Zealand. It was part of the Otago gold rush that occurred during the 1860s, leading to an influx of miners from rushes in California and Victoria, Australia. These miners brought with them a rich diversity of cultures from England, Scotland, Wales, Ireland, Sweden, China, Australia, Canada, and the United States. The area was named after the goldfield by the same name in Victoria.

Mining continued until 1943, when the government mining subsidy was withdrawn. Renewed interest since then has triggered activity in the 1980s, early in the 21st century, and again in the 2020s. The Bendigo Goldfields region is located 17 kilometres (11 mi) to the northeast of Cromwell, at the head of Lake Dunstan.

Much of the Bendigo Goldfields are managed by the Department of Conservation as both a Scenic Reserve and Historic Reserve. A bonus for visitors is the magnificent view of the Pisa Range across the upper Clutha Valley, and north towards the mountains beyond Lake Hāwea. Visitors are freely able to wander at will, but care should be taken due the nature of the country and deep mine shafts. Children should be well supervised.

== Geography ==
The Bendigo Goldfields region covers three former settlements: the township of Bendigo, and the two unofficial townships of Logantown and Welshtown. Bendigo initially serviced the early alluvial goldminers on the lower reaches of Bendigo Creek (near Goodall's Hotel), Aurora Creek, and the upper Rise and Shine Creek. Logantown and Welshtown would eventually become part of the wider Bendigo site of alluvial mining when quartz miners drove dozens of shafts into the hills.

Within the Bendigo Scenic Reserve there are several walks with a number of interpretative panels, ranging from short wanders to a 5-hour loop trail. Several stone building ruins, vertical shafts, adits, numerous battery sites, water races, pipelines, and the remains of several wooden drays may be seen in the area.

=== Bendigo ===
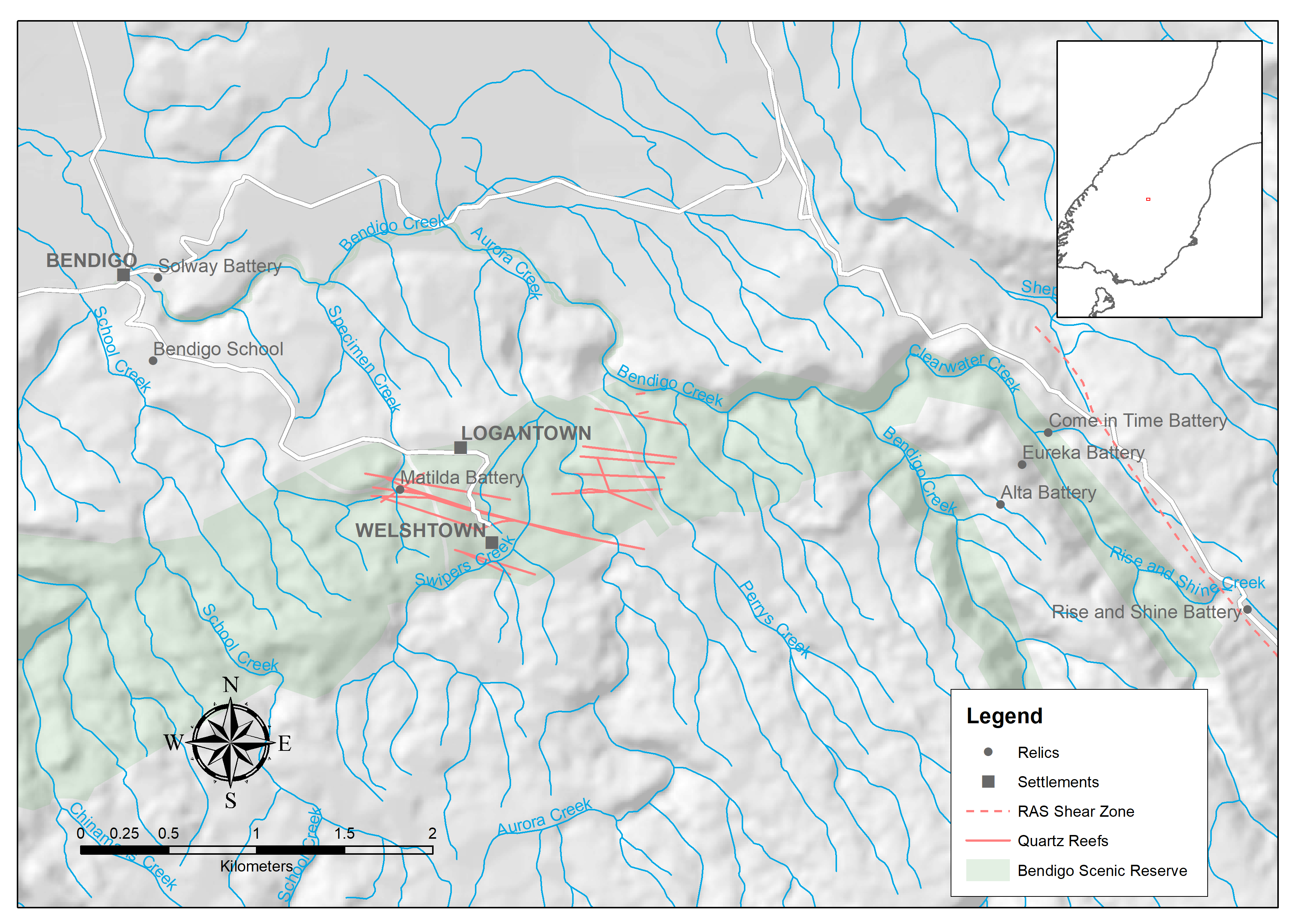
Location map of the Bendigo Goldfields

Alluvial gold was first discovered in Bendigo Creek as a result of the rush to the Dunstan area in September 1862. The initial prospectors arrived in Bendigo Creek, a tributary of the Clutha River, by traversing Thomson's Saddle in the Dunstan Mountains and dropping into Thomson Gorge.

With reports of significant quartz finds people flocked to Bendigo (44°55′30″S 169°20′40″E), but it would not be until 1869 that the Provincial Government was forced to survey and lay out an official town. The town was set out in a simple grid pattern similar to the successful Cromwell Company's Solway Battery. The two primary streets were York and Oxford, the junction of which still remains today with the remainder of the town now being largely covered in vineyards.

At its peak, Bendigo supported a population of 130 and by 1869 consisted of the Solway Battery, Goodall's Bendigo Reef Hotel, Mitchinson and Harrison's General Store, a blacksmith, a drapers, a billiards saloon and the huts of men working at the battery. A second hotel, The Solway, was opened in 1870, followed by a bakery and butcher's shop in 1872. Bendigo's popularity was short-lived however; by late 1875, most of the businesses were abandoned in favour of nearby Logantown.

Little remains of Bendigo today. York and Oxford Street form part of the Bendigo Loop Road, while all that is left of the town are the stone remains of the bakery, some mature poplar trees, and remains of other stone walls. Extensive vineyards now cover the terraces and lower slopes surrounding this area.

=== Logantown ===
The early phase of alluvial mining at Bendigo was short-lived, from 1862 to 1866. Prospectors were driven to the source of the gold bound in quartz reefs in the nearby hills. It was the discovery of the gold-rich Cromwell Reef by Thomas Logan that made Bendigo famous. This discovery, in 1863, eventually resulted in most Bendigo businesses moving up the hill to be closer to the reefs being mined. By December 1869, a thriving town had built up on an area of flat ground midway between Logan's and Colclough's reefs; this became known as Logantown (44°56′5″S 169°22′5″E).

In 1869 the Cromwell Argus newspaper reported that Logantown consisted of four stores, three hotels, two butchers, a bakery, and a drapery. There was also a blacksmith (two, a year later), a saloon, a restaurant, and (by April 1871) seven hotels. This was in addition to miners' tents and Thomas Logan's own residence. At its peak, Logantown and the wider area of Bendigo may have had a population of 400. The rapid growth of Logantown businesses far surpassed the population, and by September 1871 many businesses had started to move to Quartzville and Carricktown in the Carrick Range following quartz reef discoveries there. A community hall was erected in 1874 which doubled as a church and, briefly, as a school. In 1878, the school was moved halfway down the hill toward Bendigo. The site of this building is marked by a remaining concrete chimney. The school was shifted again in 1909 to a site near Crippletown, now beside State Highway 8.

Logantown continued as a much smaller settlement through the remainder of the 1870s and by 1878 was reported by the Dunstan Times newspaper to consist of a hotel, a butchery, and a few huts.

Today, Logantown contains the walls of numerous stone buildings and a wooden dray outside the former residence of Thomas Logan.

=== Welshtown ===
Further up the road from Logantown, on the crest of Bendigo Hill, was the settlement of Welshtown (44°56′25″S 169°22′10″E), so-named due to the predominance of Welsh miners. Welshtown was essentially a cluster of miners' huts, stables, and gardens with the notable exception being William Pengelly's hotel across the gully of Swipers Creek (the western tributary of Aurora Creek).

Welshtown was the scene of a bitter dispute between the Cromwell Company and its employees, the latter of whom went on strike for better pay in 1881. It is the only instance of such action in any industrial conflict in New Zealand's history in which each miner whose house, hut, or cottage was built on the 16½ acres of the Cromwell Company lease (half of Bendigo's Welshtown) had their homes destroyed. Some of the remains of houses demolished by the Cromwell Company bear testament to this dark period of Bendigo's history, reminiscent of the Irish Land Wars and Scottish Highland Clearances.

Like Logantown and Bendigo before it, the remains of Welshtown have been reduced to the stone walls of several miners cottages and the Pengelly Hotel.

== Mining history ==
Although the first gold to be discovered in Bendigo was alluvial in origin, the greatest rewards would come from the quartz reefs in the nearby hills. Of all the mining claims and leases that were taken up at Bendigo, only that of the Cromwell Quartz Mining Company (Cromwell Company) was profitable. The Cromwell Company's battery at Bendigo started crushing in March 1869 and it was the success of these first crushings that spurred the rush to the Bendigo reefs.

=== Initial alluvial gold discovery ===
Alluvial gold was first discovered in Bendigo Creek as a result of the rush to the Dunstan area in September 1862. A party of miners used Thomson's Saddle, an old Māori greenstone trail over the Dunstan Mountains, in order to take the ferry across the Clutha River at Wakefield (now known as Crippletown) near Rocky Point, on their way to the Shotover, Arrow, and Cardrona goldfields. Gold in the gravels of Bendigo Gully was poor and referred to as a tucker field (that is, there was only enough gold to provide for a miner's subsistence). However, by 1864 with the advent of sluicing companys' water races, up to 150 miners had pegged out claims along the creek with some yielding 5–15 t oz (155–467 g) a week. Most of the alluvial mining on the Bendigo goldfield took place in Bendigo Creek itself, Aurora Creek (and a tributary of the latter, Swipers Creek), and the upper Rise and Shine Creek. The latter was worked by a group of Swedes in the 1860s who, in 1867, brought a water race a considerable distance across the Thomson Range to provide water for sluicing.

The early rush for alluvial mining at Bendigo was short-lived, from 1862 to 1866. It was Logan's discovery of the gold-rich Cromwell Reef that made Bendigo famous. Despite the impending shift toward quartz reef mining, of the 52 claims being worked by mid-1870 only 18 were quartz claims, the rest still being alluvial.

=== Cromwell Reef (Logan's Reef / Solway Reef) ===
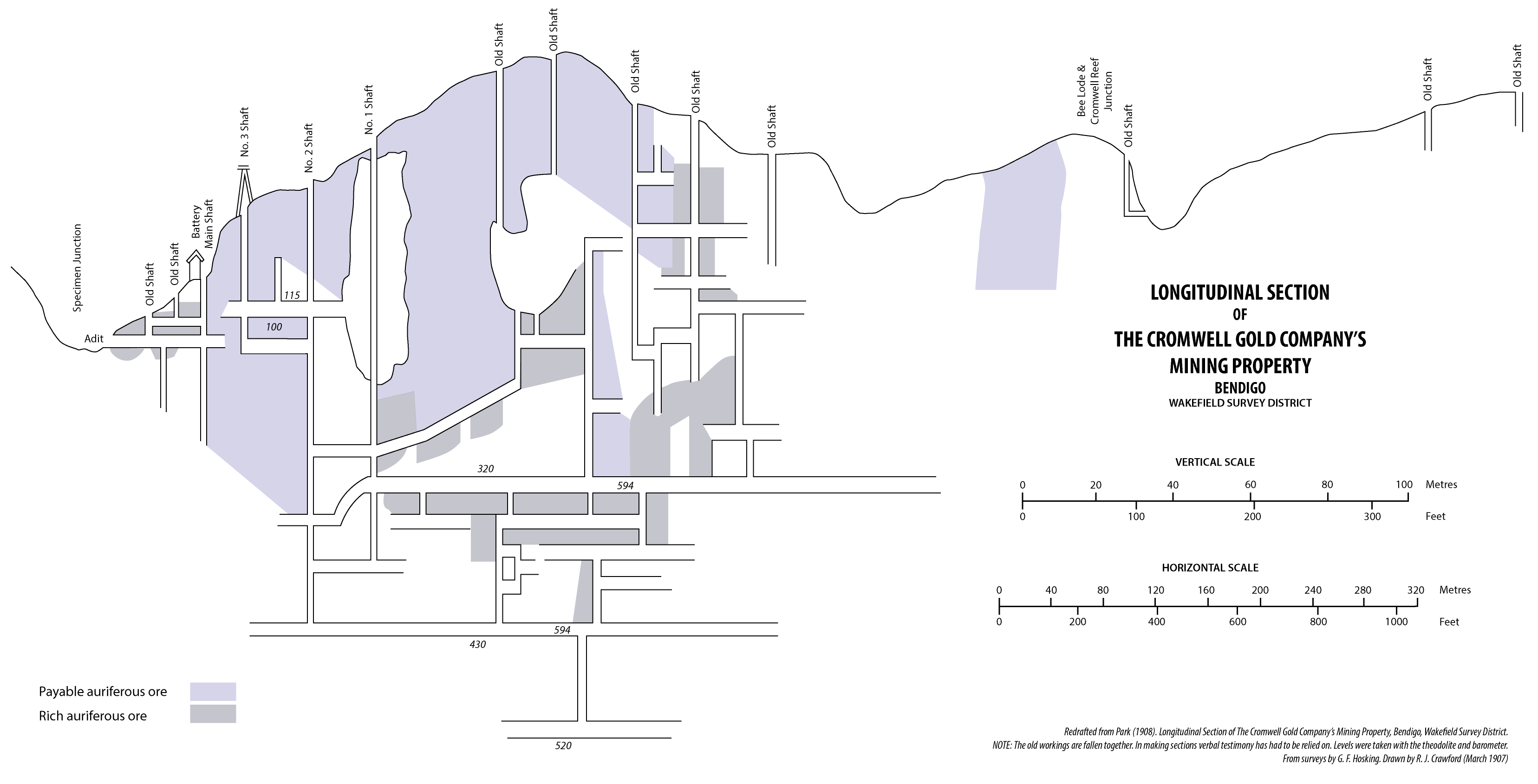
Bendigo Reefs longitudinal cross section (east-west)

Thomas Logan (1836-1897) was born in St Bees, Cumberland. After the gold rush in Victoria he came to Otago and worked as an alluvial miner. In 1863, Logan began to prospect the lower slopes of Bendigo Hill, searching for quartz reefs from which the alluvial gold had been liberated. Logan located several lines of gold-bearing reefs, including the rich Cromwell (or Logan's) Reef. Unlike alluvial mining, quartz mining was a costly enterprise and a lack of capital prevented Logan from developing his reefs. It was not until Julian Coates reported the reefs in 1865 to a group of Dunedin businessmen that the Bendigo Quartz Mining Company was formed in order to mine Logan's finds. The generally held belief at this point is that Logan felt the businessmen were treating him unfairly, and he subsequently led them to poor ground causing them to eventually withdrawal from the project. This version of events is largely based on the limited data sources that were available to J. C. Parcell, as documented in his book Heart of the Desert. A more recent revision of events, based on a more balanced review of the available literature, suggests that Logan did not swindle the businessmen. Instead, it is quite possible that the inexperience of the mining company was the reason for the Dunedin syndicate's demise. In any event, the Bendigo Quartz Mining Company was only to last a brief four months, ceasing operations in mid-1866.

It was not until July 1868 that Logan was able to find appropriate investment to restart work on the reefs he had found. Together with William John 'Jack' Garrett, Brian 'Charcoal Joe' Hebden and George Goodger, he formed the Cromwell Quartz Mining Company. They purchased a 12-head stamper battery and water wheel from a defunct Hindon mining company, and erected it at the mouth of Bendigo Gorge as The Solway Battery. The initial returns were a substantial 238 oz (6.7 kg) from the first ten days work. Vincent Pyke, Warden of the goldfields, later described the Cromwell Reef as:

...undoubtedly the richest quartz reef in Otago. Some parts of it yielded as much as six ounces of gold to the ton, and as the stone was generally friable, great quantities of it could be extracted and put through the stamper daily.

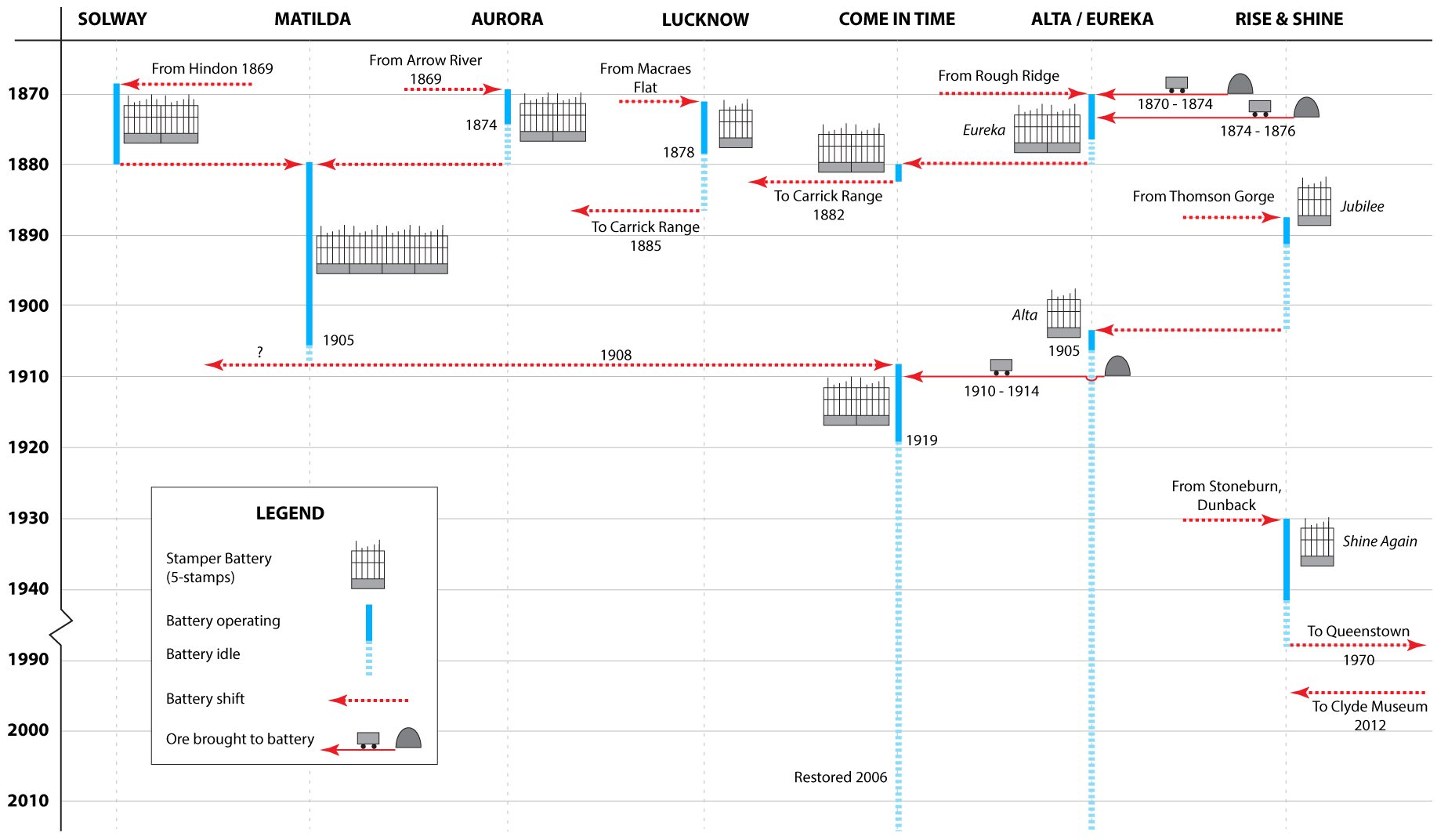
Diagram showing the transfers of batteries around the Bendigo goldfields region. Adapted from Hamel (1993, Fig. 8a) and Carpenter (2013, Fig. 9)

A new gold rush began, with Bendigo and Logantown at its centre, while Cromwell developed new prosperity. Thomas Logan sold his shares in the Cromwell Company for £15,000 in 1875.

In December 1878, the Solway Battery was moved up the hill to the main shaft of the mine so that the ore could be processed on location. The defunct Aurora Battery in Aurora Creek was purchased to add to a new 20-stamper battery which was christened "Matilda" after George Goodger's daughter. It was driven by a water turbine and by an eighteen-horsepower steam engine, fuelled with coal from Bannockburn. Poor returns and industrial problems saw the mine close in 1884. A new company drove a 178 m (584 ft)-deep shaft (No.2 Shaft) into a different part of the reef and the battery was reopened in 1886. It closed again because of poor returns in about 1900. Ten stamps were sold and shifted to form the Come in Time Battery, where they remain intact to this day.

In all, the Cromwell Reef was said to have produced gold to the value of £500,000 by 1887. All that remains of the Matilda Battery today are the stone and wooden footings and some corrugated iron scraps.

=== Aurora Reef ===
The Aurora Company (Edward Barnes and John Perriam) discovered a reef in May 1869 in the area now known as Aurora Gully. They sank two shafts and extracted ten tons of ore that was sent to Solway Battery to be crushed. The company later purchased a battery from the defunct Criterion Company at Arrow River, and in September 1869 they erected it at the mine site.

The company had set up as a water race venture, constructing a race from Devils Creek (south of Bendigo) to the Bendigo Goldfield. The race commenced operations April 1867, and was providing water for miners to hydro-sluice the alluvial gravels at the goldfield. The company was made up of Barnes, Gerrard and Company, who found a quartz lode reef. A 5-stamp battery was bought, with another five stamps added, which opened in February 1870. There were rich early crushings, but the quality subsided, and the battery was then used for public crushing.

By 1871 the mine was on tribute, but within six months they abandoned the underground workings, and it was decided to sluice the gravels of the neighbouring terrace for gold. In 1872 only two men were tributing at the mine. In September 1874, the company was voluntarily wound up, with the battery being purchased by the Cromwell Company and moved to its main shaft.

=== Alta Reef ===
The Alta reef was discovered by Samuel Williams, a quartz miner from Victoria, in December 1869. Although he discovered it, Williams played little part in the subsequent development of the mine, instead moving to the Carrick Range as a principal share holder in the Young Australian Company.

Alta Reef lies south of the present Come in Time battery, onb the other side of a ridge. The Alta Company, formed to work the reef, purchased a battery from the Ida Valley Company in Rough Ridge and erected the 5-stamp Eureka Battery on the slope above the Rise and Shine Creek, with a race to drive the battery and a long tramway linking the workings. Problems were encountered in trying to recover the gold from the crushed rock, due to the presence of abundant scheelite which made crushing difficult. This eventually forced the mine to close, and the plant was subsequently sold in January 1875 to the Eureka Company who moved the battery to the bottom of the gully (the site where the present Come in Time Battery now resides). Gold recovered from eight crushings realised a grade between 3.5–19 dwt (5.4–29.5 g) of gold per ton.

Additional attempts to reinstate the Alta mine were made in 1897, 1902, 1912, and 1919, all with poor results. The attempt in 1902 saw the defunct five-stamper Jubilee Battery moved next to the claim (where it presently resides) and powered by a diesel engine. Patchy successes resulted in the mine closing by 1906. A third attempt to reopen the mine in 1912 resulted in the erection of an aerial cableway which lowered the quartz ore to the old Come in Time battery. The final attempt to work the Alta Reef (as well as the Come in Time Reef) was made in 1919 using both the Come in Time battery and the aerial cableway. Results were not encouraging and the reef was finally abandoned.

Remains of the Alta Reef include the stamper battery, several adits and shafts, and the tramway (though the rails are long-since removed) from the Alta mine to the aerial cableway winder unit on the Come in Time side of Rise and Shine Creek.

=== Lucknow Reef (Colclough's Reef) ===
Colclough's reef was discovered in May 1869 by Charles Colclough, one of a small number of miners from Cardrona who had come to Bendigo to prospect. Rumours immediately suggested the reef was fantastically rich, yielding as much as 100 t oz (3.1 kg) to the ton, though the reality was that the first crushings from Colclough's Reef at the Aurora battery were between 2.5 and 3 t oz (78 and 93 g) per ton. These returns were encouraging enough for the company to purchase a stamper battery from Macraes Flat, and the Colclough Quartz Mining Company was formed. Mining began in earnest in December 1870 but results were poor. September 1871 returns were only 8 dwt (12 g) per ton. The mine persisted on meagre returns for another year before changing hands.

Similarly poor returns were experienced for the next six years when the mine went on tribute (February 1877). This too did not last, coming to an end in March 1878. In December 1885, tenders were called to shift the Lucknow battery to White's Reef near Fruitlands on the Old Man Range.

=== Come in Time Reef ===
Coal carrier John Kane discovered a gold-bearing quartz reef in a small tributary to the east of the Rise and Shine Creek in June 1880, while on a delivery run from Bannockburn. Kane went into business with William Cameron to mine the quartz reef, purchasing the abandoned Eureka Battery on the slope above and shifting it to its current location. It was renamed the Come in Time Gold Stamper Battery.

The first crushing of 350 tons of ore yielded only 120 t oz (3.7 kg) of gold (10.6 g/ton) and the second was equally disappointing. By August 1881 operations ceased, and in 1882 the battery was sold and moved to the Carrick Range.

In June 1908 a new Come in Time Mining Company was formed, and half of the 20-stamp Matilda Battery was moved from nearby Logantown to the site. Like the first, it was named the Come in Time Battery. The crushings were disappointing, and by February 1909 the mine was again abandoned.

From 1912 to 1920 different parties attempted to obtain better results from various ore sources in the vicinity. All met with meagre results, and the battery and workings were finally abandoned in the 1920s.

The Come in Time battery was restored in 2006 by the Otago Goldfields Heritage Trust and DOC.

=== Rise and Shine Reef ===
The first Rise and Shine Reef was discovered in 1872 by the Rise and Shine sluicers that worked the gully. They initially sank a shaft 30 ft (9.1 m), but this was deepened to 80 ft (24 m) by the Eureka Company in 1875. A party of Chinese miners, Hop Fong Li & Company, were apparently working the Rise and Shine Reefs in the late 1870s, but it was not until June 1888 that William Lidston discovered a reef which resulted in serious investment. Lidston formed the Jubilee Syndicate which started with a 2-head battery and a shaft dug 40 ft (12 m) deep before yields dropped to 0.5 t oz (15.5 g) per ton. The Jubilee Syndicate briefly prospected at the head of Thomson Gorge (the Jubilee workings on Mount Moka), but this too had poor returns. Despite this, the Jubilee Syndicate bought and moved the 5-stamp Young Elephant battery from Thomson Gorge and continued to work their original claim. By June 1890 they had abandoned the mine.

During the depression years in the early 1930s there was considerable activity at the Rise and Shine. Renewed interest with the Eureka shaft resulted in it being deepened a further 9 ft (2.7 m) by the Bendigo Rise and Shine Company. Running a cut along the face of the lode, gold assays at the time indicated between 9 t oz (280 g) per ton and a staggering 26 t oz (809 g) per ton. A modest plant consisting of a crusher, ball mill, Wilfley table, and Berdan pan were purchased, but returns were also modest and nothing like the gold assays suggested. Greater returns were to follow, but the lode was lost and operations ceased in April 1937.

A newly formed Shine Again Gold Mining Company worked the reef from January 1938 onward using a 5-stamp battery originally from the Stoneburn near Dunback. A tramway was installed to transport ore, but throughout the life of the mine returns were disappointing, averaging about 3 dwt (4.7 g) per ton.

With the closure of the Shine Again mine in August 1942, the last quartz mining venture at Bendigo ended. Very little remains in the Rise and Shine area, although several shafts and adits remain in addition to a few prospect pits in the area worked by the alluvial sluicers.

=== Bendigo Gold Light Company dredging ===
The Bendigo Gold Light Company began working the lower reaches of Bendigo Creek on 18 May 1935, having procured and moved — at great cost — a gold dredge from Waikaka, Southland. Issues were to plague the short-lived operational life of the project, with the dredge being decommissioned a little over a year later with few gold finds. The Mines Department found that the test bores for the initial claim had been miscalculated, and that the ground had been mined several times already. The dredge itself also suffered from a faulty tailings elevator, a lack of water to float the dredge, and critically, the bucket ladder could not get down deep enough to process potential virgin ground.

The Cromwell Lions Club later took possession of the dredge's 30 m (98 ft)-long dredge (bucket) ladder and used it as a footbridge to access an island in the Clutha River. Following the filling of Lake Dunstan in 1993, the dredge ladder became redundant and was moved to its current resting place overlooking its original Bendigo working area in July 2012. The dredge is accessible to the public.

=== Recent past ===
The last resident miner at Bendigo was a World War II veteran, Wattie Thompson, who lived in a hut on the bank of Bendigo Creek near the old town. For three years he laboured single-handed at stacking a huge pile of boulders along the bank of the creek with the aim of getting down to the pay dirt at the bottom, only to have it buried beneath a deep layer of stones in a flash flood. A loner and deeply religious man, he lived close to nature. In 1979 he purchased a ticket with his hard-won earnings for a flight over the Antarctic, only to perish in the Mount Erebus disaster.

Since this point, minor forays have been made in the reprocessing of alluvial gravels at Bendigo, including the Hopgood brothers in 1985 and Alluvial Processing Ltd in 1986.

The Rise and Shine reefs have seen a series of modern mineral exploration programs: 1971 (ACI Minerals), 1983 (Placer Pacific), 1985-1989 (BHP), 1989-1991 (Macraes Mining), 1996 (Aurum), 2003-2004 (HPD), 2004-2005 (Oceana JV) and 2005-2008 (Glass Earth).

=== Current gold mining activities ===
The Rise and Shine area has seen much continued activity up to the present day. Exploration drilling by Santana Minerals on the crest of the hill above the right bank of Rise and Shine Creek has led to an indicated resource of 0.3 million troy ounces (9.3 tonnes) and an inferred resource of 2.9 million troy ounces (90 tonnes) of gold.

Unlike the quartz reefs in Bendigo which typically exist as discrete mineralised veins of quartz ranging in width between 1 and 8 ft (0.30 and 2.44 m), the Rise and Shine reefs are located in a mineralised shear zone. The shear zone occurs in the footwall of the Thomson Gorge Fault trending northwest–southeast, along which the Rise and Shine Creek is confined. In contrast to the east–west trending reefs at Bendigo, the Rise and Shine shear zone is up to 50 m (160 ft) thick and consists of hydrothermally-altered schist within which mineralised microshears (1-100 μm thick) occur with associated gold. The historical workings (upper Rise and Shine alluvial workings, Jubilee/Eureka, and Come in Time) exploited cross-cutting mineralised quartz veins which are not the target of the modern exploration effort. Instead, the target is the mineralised shear zone, similar to the Hyde-Macraes shear zone which hosts Macraes Mine.

== Notable Bendigo Goldfields mining-era relics ==
Bendigo Goldfields Accessible Mining Era Relics
	Details of Remains	Coordinates
Alta Stamp Battery	Stone ruins, unrestored 5 stamp battery and mine workings including shaft	44.93964°S 169.40706°E
Aurora Mine	Shafts, miners stone hut remains	44.93763°S 169.3786°E
Dredge Bucket Arm	The dredge ladder from the former Bendigo Gold Light Company dredge	44.92602°S 169.34470°E
Lucknow Mine	Adits in the creek below the Aurora Mine. Stamper sold in 1885 to Whites Mine near Fruitlands on the Old Man Range	44.93606°S 169.37731°E
Come in Time Red Tunnel	60 m tunnel (adit). Named after the red waste rock (Mullock) at its entrance	44.93535°S 169.41190°E
Come in Time Stamp Battery	Restored 10 stamp battery and associated Pelton wheel	44.93599°S 169.41013°E
Eureka Stamp Battery	Remains of Eureka stamp battery (footings) on the slope above the Come in Time battery	44.93756°S 169.40815°E
Cromwell Mine	Numerous shafts, adits and open quartz reef workings running from Logantown to Welshtown	44.93748°S 169.36380°E
Mathilda Battery	Remains of stamper battery platform	44.93748°S 169.36380°E
Rise and Shine Mine	Limited remnants of workings (adits) and mountings for Jubilee Battery (1888-1891)	44.94548°S 169.42396°E

== Maps ==
Map illustrating mining relics from the Bendigo goldfields. Locations of miners huts are accurate unless stated otherwise. Mine shafts are generally only approximate as many shaft locations are sourced from Park (1908) and may not longer exist at the surface.	Map illustrating quartz reefs trends (approximate) as mapped by Park (1908). Open workings from aerial imagery are consistent with quartz reef orientations	Map illustrating open workings on quartz reefs in bendigo and Mt Moka. Open workings are derived from aerial imagery	Map illustrating adits (horizontal drives) associated with quartz reef mining in Bendigo. As mapped by Park (1908)
