= Shrek (sheep) =

New Zealand sheep (1994–2011)

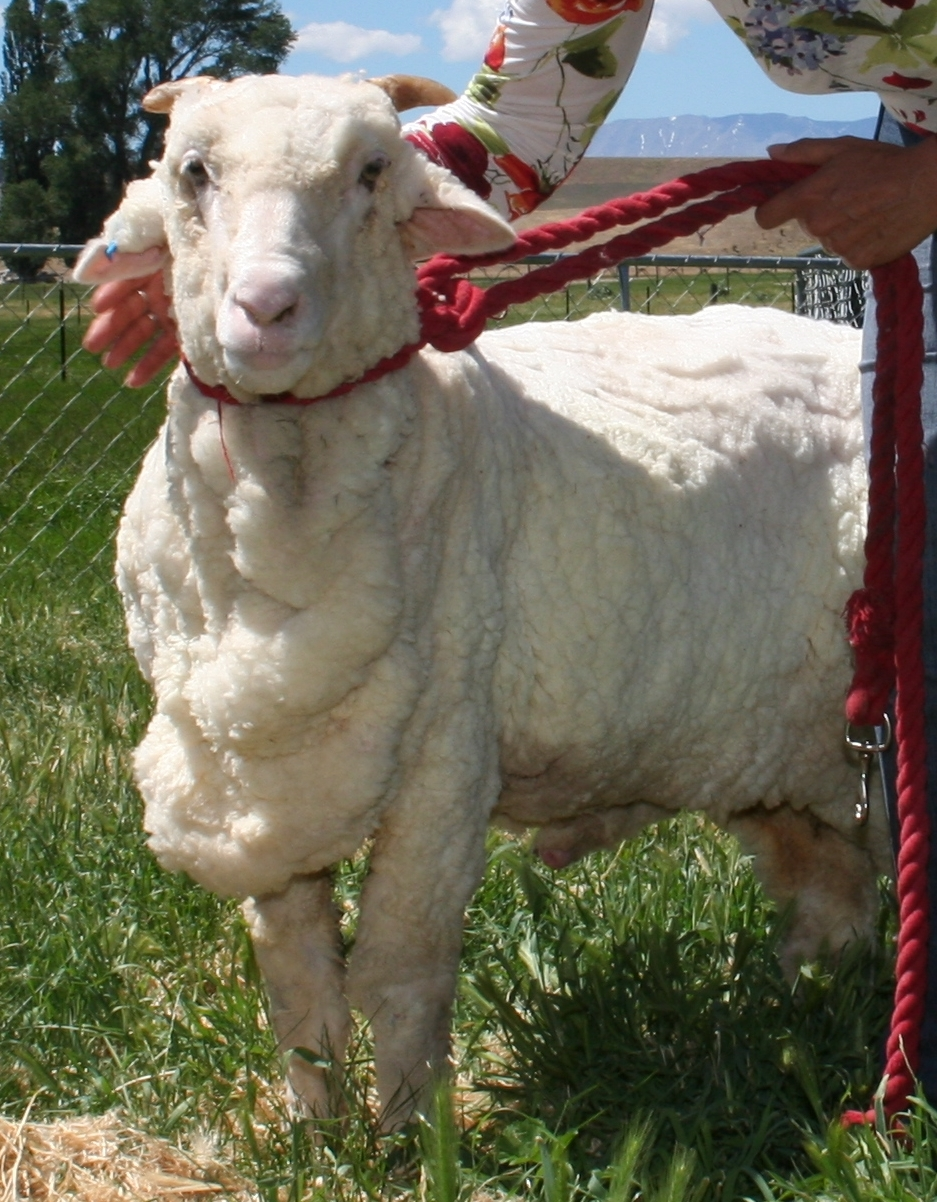
- Shrek in November 2008
- Species: Ovis aries (domestic sheep)
- Breed: Merino
- Sex: Male
- Born: 27 November 1994; New Zealand
- Died: 6 June 2011 (aged 16); Otago, New Zealand
- Nationality: New Zealand
- Years active: 2004–2011
- Known for: Avoiding capture Having grown 27 kg of wool
- Owner: Bendigo Station
- Named after: Shrek (fictional ogre)

Shrek (27 November 1994 – 6 June 2011) was a Merino wether belonging to Bendigo Station, a sheep station in Bendigo, Central Otago, New Zealand. He gained international fame in 2004, after he avoided being caught and shorn for six years. Merinos are normally shorn annually, but Shrek apparently hid in caves, avoiding muster. He was named after the fictional ogre Shrek.

== Life ==
Shrek was a Merino wether belonging to Bendigo Station, a sheep station in Bendigo. He gained international fame in 2004, after he avoided being caught and shorn for six years. Merinos are normally shorn annually, but Shrek apparently hid in caves, avoiding muster. After being discovered on 15 April 2004, he was named after the fictional ogre Shrek after someone on the farm said that he looked like an ogre. Perriam stated that, according to a former chairman of Saatchi & Saatchi, the media attention that Shrek received within two weeks of his discovery would have cost about $100 million.

He was shorn by a professional on 28 April, which took 20 minutes and was broadcast on national television. His fleece contained enough wool to make 20 large men's suits, weighing 27 kg (60 lb) – an average Merino fleece weighs around 4.4 kg (9.7 lb), with exceptional weights up to around 15 kg (33 lb). In his book about Shrek, Perriam wrote that he expected the media attention to end after the shearing.

To celebrate his 10th birthday in May 2004, he was taken to parliament to meet the then-New Zealand Prime Minister, Helen Clark. In November 2006, 30 months after his initial shearing, Shrek was shorn again, on an iceberg floating off the coast of Dunedin. Shrek was also shorn on the Auckland Sky Tower observation deck, raising money for charity.

DreamWorks owns the trademark for the ogre Shrek. They allowed Cure Kids to use the name "Shrek the Sheep" for charitable fundraising. Perriam stated that "When we have an opportunity to highlight Shrek, we have an agreement with DreamWorks that we run it past them". In 2011, after Shrek's death, DreamWorks granted permission for the use of the name in a Te Papa exhibition.

== Death and legacy ==
Shrek was euthanised on 6 June 2011 on a veterinarian's advice, because of age-related illness. He was 16. His inner body was cremated at Invermay Agricultural Centre. The rest of his body remained in a taxidermist's freezer in Queenstown for six months, until it was stuffed and sent to Te Papa.

Shrek remains in the collection at Te Papa, as well as his limited edition Icebreaker jersey, blanket cover and his fleece. Charity work involving Shrek's wool and appearances raised about $170,000 for the charity CureKids. The books about Shrek written by students at Tarras School raised over $100,000. This allowed the school to stay open as it was facing closure.

In 2014, a taxidermied Shrek appeared in an exhibition at Te Papa. He was treated and stuffed by the taxidermist David Jacobs, based in Queenstown.

In 2022, another sheep who evaded shearing for many years was named 'Shrekapo' after the original Shrek the sheep.

In 2024, a wooden box with a cutting of wool from Shrek was discovered at the New Zealand parliament onsite storage facility. It had been a gift to prime minister Helen Clark in 2004, who met him later that year.

At the time of Shrek's death, Radio New Zealand reported that he was the subject of three children's books. There are two bronze statues of Shrek in Tarras, both made by Minhal Al Halabi.

== See also ==
- Chris – a similar case in Australia
- Fiona – a similar case in Scotland
- Sonny Wool – tongue-in-cheek "psychic sheep" that became popular during the 2011 Rugby World Cup
