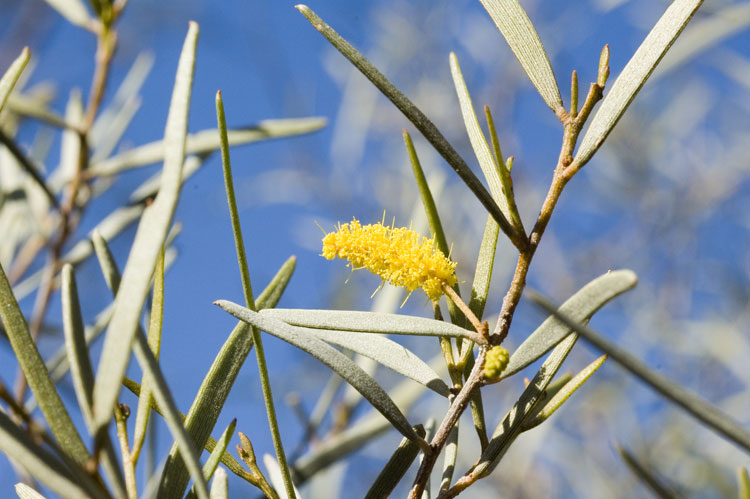
- In the Australian National Botanic Gardens

Scientific classification
- Kingdom: Plantae
- Clade: Embryophytes
- Clade: Tracheophytes
- Clade: Spermatophytes
- Clade: Angiosperms
- Clade: Eudicots
- Clade: Rosids
- Order: Fabales
- Family: Fabaceae
- Subfamily: Caesalpinioideae
- Clade: Mimosoid clade
- Genus: Acacia
- Species: A. incurvaneura

Binomial name
- Acacia incurvaneura Maslin & J.E.Reid
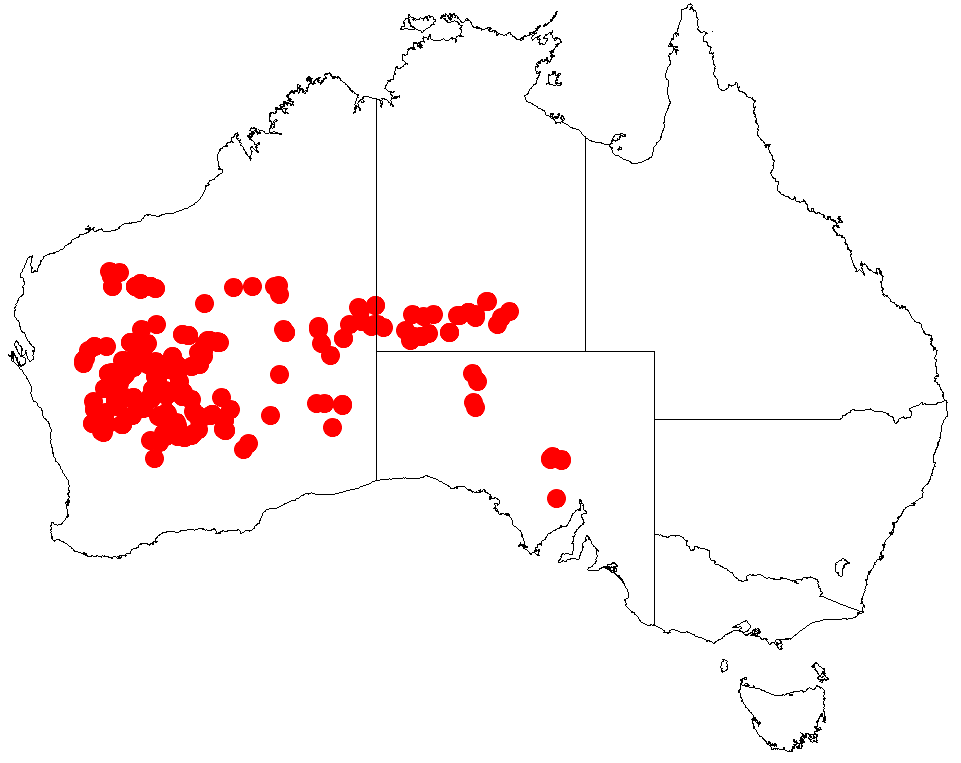
- Occurrence data from AVH

Synonyms
- Acacia aneura var. microcarpa Pedley nom. inval.; Acacia aneura var. microcarpa Pedley; Racosperma aneurum var. microcarpum (Pedley) Pedley

= Acacia incurvaneura =

Narrow-leaf wattle

Species of plant

Acacia incurvaneura, also known as narrow-leaf wattle, is a species of flowering plant in the family Fabaceae and is endemic to inland areas of western Australia. It is rounded or inverted cone-shaped, multi-stemmed shrub, its branchlets covered wit a layer of opaque yellowish resin, ascending to erect narrowly linear, terete phyllodes, spikes of light golden yellow flowers, and leathery, narrowly oblong to spindle-shaped pods.

== Description ==
Acacia incurvaneura is a rounded or inverted cone-shaped, multi-stemmed shrub that typically grows to 2.5–5 m (8 ft 2 in – 16 ft 5 in) high and 3–6 m (9.8–19.7 ft) wide, maturing to a tree up to 6 m (20 ft) high. It has ribbed branchlets covered by a more or less thick layer of opaque, yellowish resin, the new shoots resinous with white hairs pressed against the surface between resinous longitudinal veins. The phyllodes are ascending to erect, mostly curved, narrowly linear, terete to flat and not rigid, mostly 40–80 mm (1.6–3.1 in) long and 1–2.5 mm (0.039–0.098 in) wide, the tips more or less hooked or curved. The phyllodes are normally grey-green to greyish or subglaucous. The flowers are light golden yellow and borne in spikes 15–20 mm (0.59–0.79 in) long on peduncles 3–6 mm (0.12–0.24 in) long. Flowering has been recorded in March and April, and from July to November and the pods are oblong to narrowly oblong or spindle-shaped, 10–40 mm (0.39–1.57 in) long, mostly 5–8 mm (0.20–0.31 in) wide, leathery, flat and mostly brown, sometimes tinged with grey. The seeds are oblong to elliptic, 3.5–4.0 mm (0.14–0.16 in) long and 2.0–2.5 mm (0.079–0.098 in) wide, shiny dark brown with a small, white aril.

== Taxonomy ==
Acacia incurvaneura was first formally described in 2012 by Bruce Maslin and Jordan E. Reid in the journal Nuytsia from specimens Maslin collected 34 km (21 mi) east of the Great Northern Highway on the Paynes Find-Sandstone Road in 2008. The specific epithet (incurvaneura) is derived from a Latin word meaning incurved with aneura, (referring to Acacia aneura) as the stem.

== Distribution and habitat ==
The species of wattle is found in areas of Western Australia areas eastwards of Yalgoo (about 117°E), north-western South Australia and southern parts of the Northern Territory. It grows in a range of habitats, often in sandy loam on plains or in gently undulating country in shrubland or woodland, often with A. caesaneura.

== See also ==
- List of Acacia species
