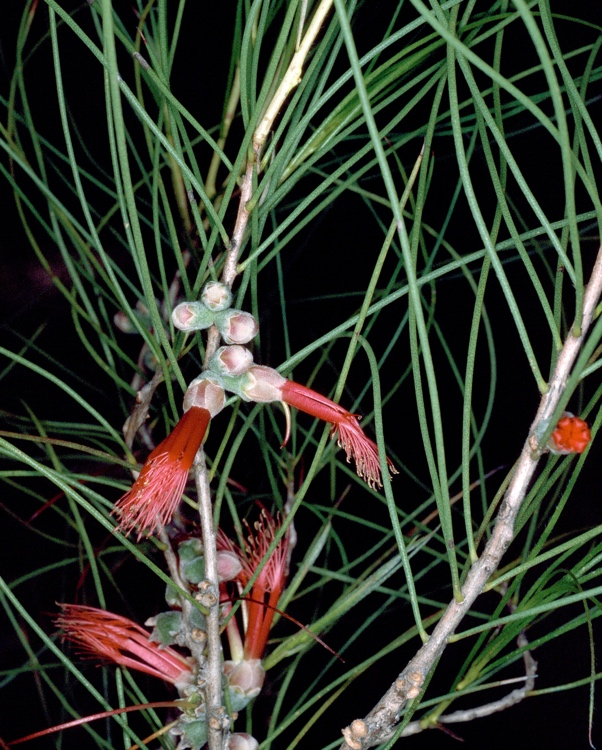
- In Kings Park, Perth

Scientific classification
- Kingdom: Plantae
- Clade: Tracheophytes
- Clade: Angiosperms
- Clade: Eudicots
- Clade: Rosids
- Order: Myrtales
- Family: Myrtaceae
- Genus: Calothamnus
- Species: C. aridus

Binomial name
- Calothamnus aridus Hawkeswood

Synonyms
- Melaleuca arida (Hawkeswood) Craven & R.D.Edwards

= Calothamnus aridus =

Species of flowering plant

Calothamnus aridus is a plant in the myrtle family, Myrtaceae and is endemic to central parts of Western Australia. It is an erect, densely branched shrub with many stems, needle-like leaves and orange-red to pinkish flowers, growing in arid areas with spinifex.

== Description ==
Calothamnus aridus grows to a height of about 2.5 metres (8 ft), has many stems and is highly branched. Its leaves are needle-like, mostly 7–10 millimetres (0.3–0.4 in) long, 0.6–1.2 millimetres (0.02–0.05 in) wide and have distinct oil glands.

The flowers are arranged in clusters or loose spikes of up to 10 on the younger stems. The five petals are 3–5 millimetres (0.1–0.2 in) long, egg-shaped, dished, thin and covered with short hairs. The stamens are arranged in five claw-like bundles, each 1.0–1.5 millimetres (0.04–0.06 in) with 10 to 12 stamens per bundle. The stamens are a shade of orange to red in the lower part and pinkish red near the ends and tipped with yellow anthers. Flowering occurs between August and October and is followed by fruits which are woody capsules, 4–8 millimetres (0.16–0.31 in) long, 5–8 millimetres (0.2–0.3 in) in diameter and shaped like flattened spheres.

== Taxonomy and naming ==
Calothamnus aridus was first formally described in 1984 by Trevor Hawkeswood from a specimen found about 40 kilometres (20 mi) south west of Wiluna. The specific epithet (aridus) is derived from Latin, referring to the arid habitat in which this species grow.

In 2014 Craven, Edwards and Cowley proposed that the species be renamed Melaleuca arida but the change is not accepted by the Australian Plant Census.

== Distribution and habitat ==
Calothamnus aridus occurs in and between the Paynes Find, Sandstone and Wiluna districts in the Avon Wheatbelt, Little Sandy Desert and Murchison biogeographic regions. It grows in woodland and sandplain in association with Triodia species.

== Conservation status ==
Calothamnus aridus is classified as "not threatened" by the Western Australian Government Department of Parks and Wildlife.
