= Acacia mulganeura =

Hilltop mulga

Scientific classification
- Kingdom: Plantae
- Clade: Tracheophytes
- Clade: Angiosperms
- Clade: Eudicots
- Clade: Rosids
- Order: Fabales
- Family: Fabaceae
- Subfamily: Caesalpinioideae
- Clade: Mimosoid clade
- Genus: Acacia
- Species: A. mulganeura

Binomial name
- Acacia mulganeura Maslin & J.E.Reid
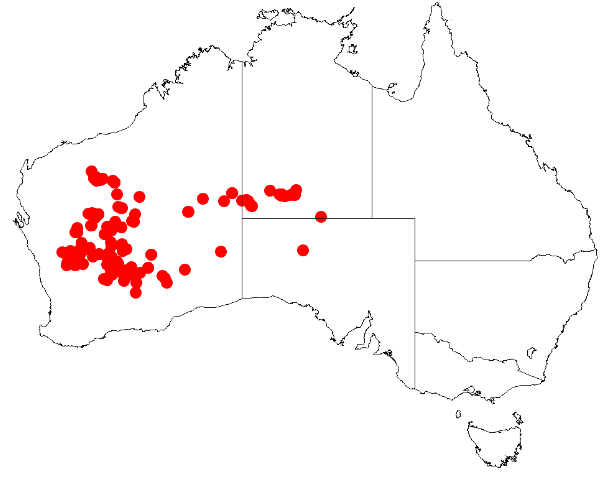
- Occurrence data from AVH

Synonyms
- Acacia aneura var. Bloods Range (D.J.Nelson 631) NT Herbarium; Acacia minyura variant; Acacia sp. Hamersley Range hilltops (S.van Leeuwen 3552); Acacia sp. Mulga short phyllodes (B.R.Maslin et al. BRM 9276) WA Herbarium

Species of plant

Acacia mulganeura, commonly known as milky mulga or hilltop mulga, is a species of flowering plant in the family Fabaceae, and is endemic to arid parts of central and western Australia. It is a rounded multi-stemmed shrub with thick layers of resin on its branchlets, elliptic to narrowly elliptic or egg-shaped to lance-shaped phyllodes, spikes of yellow flowers and oblong to spindle-shaped pods.

== Description ==
Acacia mulganeura is a rounded, multi-stemmed shrub that typically grows to a height of 1.5–3 m (4 ft 11 in – 9 ft 10 in) and has a rounded habit, maturing to a tree 4–5 m (13–16 ft) often with a compact crown. Its branchlets are ribbed, with a thick layer of opaque, segmented, milky blue-grey or yellowish resin, its new shoots very resinous, with reddish glandular hairlets embedded within the opaque resin. Its phyllodes are elliptic to narrowly elliptic, or egg-shaped to lance-shaped with the narrower end towards the base, often slightly twisted or wavy, 20–50 mm (0.79–1.97 in) long and 5–10 mm (0.20–0.39 in) wide with many longitudinal veins. The flowers are yellow, and borne in spikes 10–20 mm (0.39–0.79 in) long. Flowering has been recorded in March and April, July, August, October and November, and the pods are oblong or spindle-shaped, 15–35 mm (0.59–1.38 in) long, 6–10 mm (0.24–0.39 in) wide and firmly papery to thinly leathery. The seeds are elliptic, 4.5–5.5 mm (0.18–0.22 in) long and 2.5–3.5 mm (0.098–0.138 in) wide with a small, creamy-white aril.

== Taxonomy ==
Acacia mulganeura was first formally described in 2012 by Bruce Maslin and Jordan E. Reid in the journal Nuytsia from specimens collected by Malcolm Trudgen 5 km (3.1 mi) east-south-east of Angela Hill in the Hamersley Range. The specific epithet (mulganeura) is derived from the Latin "mulgere" meaning 'to milk' and "aneura" (from Acacia aneura), referring to the milky-coloured resin on the ribs of the branchlets of this species.

== Distribution and habitat ==
Milky mulga is widespread in Western Australia, extending from near Kalgoorlie and Payne's Find to the southern Pilbara region, with a few scattered occurrences in the far east of the state, in the Central Ranges, Coolgardie, Gascoyne, Gibson Desert, Great Victoria Desert, Little Sandy Desert, Murchison, Pilbara and Yalgoo bioregions. It also occurs in the north-west of South Australia and in the southern Northern Territory. It grows in loam, sandy loam, silty loam and clay-loam, sometimes in clay, often over hardpan on flats, undulating country or on rocky hills.

== See also ==
- List of Acacia species
