= Fruitlands =

Fruitlands may refer to several places:

- Fruitlands (transcendental center), American historic landmark; short-lived Massachusetts utopian community founded in June 1843 by Bronson Alcott and Charles Lane
  - Fruitlands Museum, American museum on site of transcendental center; in 1997 Fruitlands Museums Historic District was added to National Register of Historic Places
- Fruitlands (Augusta, Georgia), American historic domestic single dwelling added in 1979 to National Register of Historic Places listings in Richmond County, Georgia (listing 19)
- Fruitlands, New Zealand, 19th century gold mining settlement in the Central Otago district of the South Island; picturesque tourist area which takes its name from unsuccessful 1920s orchards

== See also ==
- Fruitland
