= Central Otago Airport =

Proposed airport in Central Otago, New Zealand

Coordinates: 44°50′40″S 169°23′10″E

- IATA: none; ICAO: none

Summary
- Airport type: Public
- Operator: Christchurch International Airport Limited
- Serves: Central Otago
- Location: Tarras, Otago, New Zealand
- Elevation AMSL: 243 m (797 ft)
- Interactive map of Central Otago Airport

Location of the proposed airport

Central Otago Airport (also known as Tarras Airport) is a proposed airport near Tarras in Central Otago, New Zealand. The controversial proposal was announced in July 2020 by Christchurch International Airport Limited, after a series of secretive land purchases were uncovered by a local investigative journalist. The 75% Christchurch City Council and 25% central government owned company has purchased 750 hectares of land at the intersection of State Highway 8 and State Highway 8A.

The proposal, which includes provision for wide-body aircraft, is being justified by Christchurch International Airport Limited in part because of alleged expansion limitations affecting both Wānaka and Queenstown Airports nearby. Commentators have noted that Christchurch Airport has been experiencing reduced demand since the destructive earthquakes hit the city, and the airport company is seeking "greener pastures".

== History ==
On 22 July 2020, Christchurch International Airport chief executive Malcolm Johns confirmed that the airport had purchasing a 750 hectare block of land in Tarras in Central Otago to build the proposed new airport for NZ$45 million. The proposed airport would have a 2.2 km jet-capable runway. The land borders State Highway 8 and State Highway 8A. Johns confirmed that Christchurch Airport would be consulting with local communities in the South Island including Central Otago.

On 30 May 2023, Christchurch Airport purchased another 40 hectares of farmland in Tarras from farmer Philip Parcell for an undisclosed sum.

== Responses ==
=== Local opposition ===
There has been widespread concern about the proposed airport, with locals in shock at the proposals. Soon after news of the proposed airport broke, a community meeting was held at Tarras: concerns included an "evident lack of due process" and "unanswered questions, relating to climate change, sustainable tourism, the funding trail and the legality of the whole process." Many residents of the surrounding area are opposed to the proposal, stating it will permanently change the area and their way of life.

The airport proposal led concerned locals to form Sustainable Tarras Inc. to publicly oppose the airport, and hold the airport company to account. Soon after, the group launched a petition to parliament. By early 2022, the group had established that eighty-four percent of the residents opposed the idea of the airport, and has since made moves to expand the survey to a wider group within the district. The group's focus remains on significant "unanswered questions" which people from the local community want clarity on, greater transparency and better communication from the airport company, and a series of specific concerns covering environmental, legal, climate change and infrastructure issues. Sustainable Tarras recently called out Christchurch Airport's alleged attempts to "water down environmental protections" in the region. In 2022, Christchurch Airport launched a $30,000 community fund for people in the local Tarras community; this was labelled as a "ploy to sway people" by the chairman of Sustainable Tarras.

Opposition has not just been limited to the local community in the immediate vicinity of the proposed airport. Soon after the announcement, Queenstown Mayor Jim Boult slammed the proposal. In February 2021, Wanaka Stakeholders Group Inc, the town's largest single issue membership organisation with over 3,500 members, released the results of a survey of Upper Clutha residents showing that 74% were against the planned airport at Tarras. The Group's chair, Michael Ross, was reported by Radio New Zealand as saying "The time has long since passed when the Upper Clutha community will sit back and allow airport companies to determine the future of our local infrastructure and environment, aided and actively supported by councils that place commercial interests above community interests, play down community concerns and even blatantly ignore them." The group also wrote to Prime Minister Jacinda Adern, asking her to "put a stop" to the airport development at Tarras.

In May 2021, Protestors attended the Christchurch City Council meeting to express concerns on the proposed international airport in Tarras.

In July 2021, a new anti-Tarras Airport group called Stop Central Otago Airport launched in opposition to the proposed airport. Although it is a "grass roots organisation" formed on Facebook, membership had risen to over 300 within a fortnight, with over 1000 members by July 2022.

On the 29th of September 2021, regional newspaper the Otago Daily Times published an editorial article saying that Christchurch Airport’s “reprehensible and Greedy proposal” is “like a horror movie”. The article received widespread support in social media.

There has been growing concern about the climate change impacts of the proposed airport. On August 11, 2022, campaigners told Christchurch City Councillors in public forum that "the proposed Tarras Airport and the emissions it would enable were at odds with a low-carbon future." Commentators and executives from within the industry have questioned the sustainability of a new airport at Tarras, suggesting that it is more sensible to use existing airport infrastructure. Local groups have written to MPs and the Prime Minister, outlining their concerns. One such letter published by Wanaka Stakeholders Group stated: ‘‘Government cannot expect on the one hand for other industries, such as agriculture, to significantly reduce greenhouse gas emissions, and then on the other hand allow the expansion or development of additional jet aviation capability in New Zealand, thereby enabling activity which will inevitably and significantly increase carbon emissions."

=== Industrial and local government responses ===
The proposal received some initial support from industry groups, although Air New Zealand has since confirmed that its focus is on "rebuilding its network after the covid border closure" and that further airport infrastructure "is first and foremost a matter for airport companies and local communities." Air New Zealand's former deputy chair, Norm Thompson, says he "doesn't buy the need for a Tarras terminal" as the Central Otago region already has three significant airports - Queenstown, Dunedin and Invercargill - all with remaining capacity. Glen Sowry, Chief Executive of Queenstown Airport Corporation, has labelled the plans for an airport at Tarras as "absolute nonsense". Queenstown’s Sowry says CIAL’s population graphics are “factually incorrect” and its shareholder-return claims on investment in a greenfield airport off the mark.

Politicians from the region have voiced concern at the proposals. Queenstown-Lakes District mayor Jim Boult believed the proposal was not financially viable and would never go ahead. The site was unsuitable due to winter fog, inadequate transport links to Queenstown (it is over an hour's drive away) and a lack of potential aviation customers.

=== Reaction from the scientific community ===
In late January 2023, 28 months after the original announcement, 11 professors from around New Zealand wrote an open letter opposing the development of a new international airport at Tarras. The group named themselves Informed Leaders, and sent the letter to the Prime Minister, 75% shareholders of Christchurch Airport (Christchurch City Council councillors), the Central Otago District Council amongst others. "The researchers - with expertise in the fields of business, economics, climate science, sustainability, Māori and indigenous studies, tourism, environment, agriculture, and policy studies - said it ran counter to New Zealand's commitment to reducing carbon emissions and the climate emergencies declared by councils." University of Otago professor of sustainable tourism James Higham, who brought the group together, said he and his peers strongly opposed the proposal. "Given the available research and data - and there is plenty of it - it makes no sense whatsoever to build a new airport at Tarras - or anywhere else in New Zealand for that matter." "Decisions to proceed with projects like this with the potential for significant, intergenerational impacts should not be made in isolation by individual companies. The available research and data should be factored in, discussed openly with stakeholders and key communities."

The open letter received widespread media coverage. In Crux, the professors' concerns covering climate change, the environment, economics and other key topics were outlined, while Christchurch Airport's Michael Singleton said the group's assessment was "premature" and that the airport company was taking a more "optimistic view." In the ODT, professor James Higham was quoted as saying that "the world was on a "very, very tight timeframe'' to cut carbon emissions and the aviation industry was critical to achieving climate goals" and "building a new airport at Tarras ran contrary to achieving decarbonisation." In the New Zealand Herald, the professors were quoted: "[New Zealand is] the sixth highest emitter of aviation emissions per capita in the world. Under current technologies high personal aeromobility is incompatible with the Government’s emissions mitigation goals." The airport company responded saying that the airport "can fit within New Zealand’s emissions targets and meet the challenges posed by a changing climate" and that the 11 professors' concerns "can properly be assessed as premature." In an interview on Newstalk ZB, professor Higham said that the new airport would "completely change the face of Central Otago." The academics were hoping to "open up that conversation and extend upon that letter" to ensure that good decisions are made "because the stakes are really high." "“We think including independent advice on what is being proposed here is important and we’re pleased the council has engaged in this open dialogue.”

Christchurch Mayor Phil Mauger replied to the open-letter signatories after approving five-minute speaking slots for the three of the professors at a full Christchurch City Council meeting. Professors Higham, Hayward and Noy each made presentations to the council on 15 February 2023, urging councillors to stop supporting the Tarras Airport "vanity project". Bronwyn Hayward, a professor of political science and public policy at University of Canterbury, said there was a serious misalignment with the council’s own decisions and strategic goals and its ownership in an investment, via the airport, in Tarras. Professor Ilan Noy said the council would probably say it only sets the airport’s strategic direction, but “surely that direction is not shooting the council in the foot and crippling the economy of Christchurch for the foreseeable future”. Having looked at economic models, he said that Christchurch ratepayers would be losers - whether the airport was successful or not - if the project were to go ahead. Professor Higham said: “Decarbonising air transportation is by far the greatest technical challenge this industry has ever confronted. Despite promises of zero carbon, aviation progress is very very slow.” He concluded “We believe that decisions that carry significant and long-term consequences should be fully informed by rigorous science” and indicated that an index of relevant research would be developed and launched.
