= Pimelea forrestiana =

Scientific classification
- Kingdom: Plantae
- Clade: Tracheophytes
- Clade: Angiosperms
- Clade: Eudicots
- Clade: Rosids
- Order: Malvales
- Family: Thymelaeaceae
- Genus: Pimelea
- Species: P. forrestiana

Binomial name
- Pimelea forrestiana F.Muell.

Synonyms
- Banksia forrestiana (F.Muell.) Kuntze

Species of shrub

Pimelea forrestiana is a species of flowering plant in the family Thymelaeaceae and is endemic to Western Australia. It is a shrub with linear to narrowly elliptic leaves arranged in opposite pairs, and head-like clusters of yellow, tube-shaped flowers.

== Description ==
Pimelea forrestiana is a shrub that usually grows to a height of 0.5–1.5 m (1 ft 8 in – 4 ft 11 in) and has glabrous stems. The leaves are linear to narrowly elliptic, 6–40 mm (0.24–1.57 in) long, 1.5–6.6 mm (0.059–0.260 in) wide and glabrous. The flowers are arranged in heads of many flowers on the ends of stems, the heads sometimes with a sessile involucral bract 1.5–2.0 mm (0.059–0.079 in) long and 0.5–1 mm (0.020–0.039 in) wide, but that falls off as the flowers open. The male flowers are yellow, the floral tube 3–6.5 mm (0.12–0.26 in) long and the sepals 1.2–1.5 mm (0.047–0.059 in) long. Flowering occurs from June to September.

== Taxonomy ==
Pimelea forrestiana was first formally described in 1878 by Ferdinand von Mueller in Fragmenta Phytographiae Australiae from specimens collected by John Forrest at an altitude of 2,500 ft (760 m) in the Hamersley Range. The specific epithet (forrestiana) honours the collector of the type specimens.

== Distribution and habitat ==
This pimelea grows on granite outcrops and rocky hillsides from the Hamersley Range to Lake Moore (south of Paynes Find) in the Avon Wheatbelt, Coolgardie, Murchison, Pilbara and Yalgo bioregions of Western Australia.

== Conservation status ==
Pimelea forrestiana is listed as "not threatened" by the Government of Western Australia Department of Biodiversity, Conservation and Attractions.
