= Acacia scleroclada =

Scientific classification
- Kingdom: Plantae
- Clade: Tracheophytes
- Clade: Angiosperms
- Clade: Eudicots
- Clade: Rosids
- Order: Fabales
- Family: Fabaceae
- Subfamily: Caesalpinioideae
- Clade: Mimosoid clade
- Genus: Acacia
- Species: A. scleroclada

Binomial name
- Acacia scleroclada Maslin
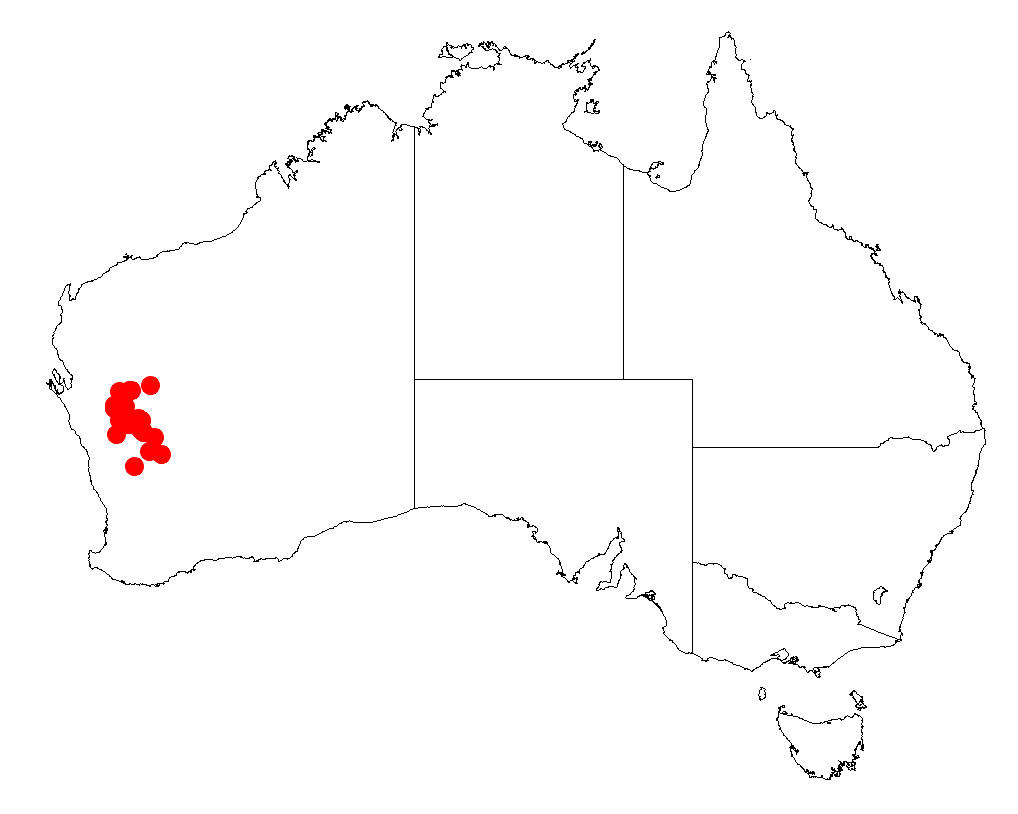
- Occurrence data from AVH

Species of legume

Acacia scleroclada is a shrub of the genus Acacia and the subgenus Phyllodineae that is endemic to an area of western Australia.

== Description ==
The spreading pungent shrub typically grows to a height of 0.5 to 1.2 metres (2 to 4 ft) and has a somewhat straggly habit. It has glabrous, straight and ascending branchlets that have striated ribbing that erminate with hard and rigid spiny points. Like most species of Acacia it has phyllodes rather than true leaves. The glabrous, pungent and subrigid phyllodes are a grey-green to blue-green colour. The phyllodes resemble the branchlets and have a narrowly linear to linear-elliptic shape and are narrowed at both ends. The straight or shallowly incurved phyllodes have a length of 2 to 7 cm (0.79 to 2.76 in) and a width of 1 to 4 mm (0.039 to 0.157 in) with a prominent midrib and five main nerves. It blooms from June to September and produces yellow flowers.

== Distribution ==
It is native to an area in the Mid West and Wheatbelt regions of Western Australia where it is often situated on hills and amonggranite outcrops growing in shallow sand or clay-sand soils. The range of the shrub extends from the Weiragoo Range located about 180 km (110 mi) to the west of Meekatharra in the north west down to around Paynes Find in the south where it is usually a part of open scrub land communities.

== See also ==
- List of Acacia species
