= Thomas Logan (prospector) =

Miner in Australia and New Zealand

- Born: 30 August 1835; St Bees, Cumberland, England
- Died: 12 August 1897 (aged 61); Dunedin, New Zealand
- Occupations: Gold miner; railway contractor
- Spouse: Mary Ann (Cissie) McGregor
- Children: 1

Thomas Logan (30 August 1835 – 12 August 1897) was a pioneer of quartz mining in Otago and was one of few early miners to win enormous wealth from gold mining in New Zealand.

== Early life and family ==
Logan was born on 30 August 1835 at St Bees, Cumberland, England. He moved to Australia following the Victorian gold rush, and married Mary Ann "Cissie" McGregor in Melbourne; they had three sons.

== Otago gold mining ==
Logan first came to New Zealand in early 1863, following the gold rush to Hartley's Beach, a bend of the Clutha River in the Cromwell Gorge. He brought with him considerable experience from gold mining in the Victorian fields of Ballarat and Bendigo.

Settling in the Cromwell area, Logan found work with mining syndicates sluicing the river terraces of Lowburn, the Upper Clutha and in the Kawarau Gorge. He arrived in Bendigo in mid-1866 towards the end of the alluvial gold mining phase that had made Bendigo a short-lived boom town. Logan was convinced that the alluvial gold in the gravels of Bendigo must be sourced in the gold-bearing quartz reefs in the hills above Bendigo and set about locating them. A fiercely energetic prospector, he had previously prospected for auriferous quartz as far as Blacks, Tinker's and Thomson’s Gullies before his persistence was rewarded when he found several promising quartz reefs on Bendigo Hill.

Lacking the capital required to mine the quartz reefs, Logan was forced to turn to investment from a group of Dunedin businessmen in 1865. The Bendigo Quartz Mining Company was formed to mine the reefs found by Logan. One version of events—documented by J. C. Parcell in his 1951 book Heart of the Desert—suggests that Logan felt the businessmen were treating him unfairly, and he subsequently led them to poor ground, causing them to eventually withdraw from the project. However, a more recent revision of events, based on a more balanced review of the available literature, suggests that Logan did not swindle the businessmen. Instead, it is quite possible that the inexperience of the mining company was the reason for the Dunedin syndicate's demise. In any event, the Bendigo Quartz Mining Company was only to last a brief four months, ceasing operations in mid-1866.

Logan found investment to mine the reefs again in 1868 when together with William John 'Jack' Garrett, Brian 'Charcoal Joe' Hebden and George Goodger, he formed the Cromwell Quartz Mining Company. The initial returns were 238 ounces (6.7 kg) from the first ten days work, resulting in Bendigo's second gold rush.

== Later life ==
Logan sold his shares in the Cromwell Company for £15,000 in 1875 (equivalent to NZ$2,281,000 in 2024). This allowed him to "embark on a career of opulence". In December 1876, he bought the racehorses Cloth of Gold and Dead Heat, and soon afterwards won the Timaru Cup with the former. He joined in some of David Proudfoot's schemes, and continued to invest in mining, although often not successfully. After living in New South Wales for many years, where he won lucrative contracts for laying railway lines, putting some of the profits into donations to a hospital, he returned to Dunedin and died there on 12 August 1897. He was buried at the Dunedin Southern Cemetery.
