= Graeme Parker =

Scottish cattle hoof trimmer

The Hoof GP
- Born: Graeme Milroy Glen Parker; 4 October 1982 (age 44); Wigtownshire, Scotland
- Occupations: Hoof trimmer; YouTuber; author

YouTube information
- Channels: TheHoofGP; TheHoofGPClips
- Years active: 2019–present
- Subscribers: 4.87 million (combined)
- Views: 2.28 billion (combined)
- Last updated: 24 October 2026

Graeme Milroy Glen Parker (born 1982) is a Scottish cattle hoof trimmer, author, and YouTuber. His YouTube channel, The Hoof GP, was created in 2019 and primarily consists of videos of hoof trimming. It is the largest agricultural YouTube channel in the world with more than 100 million views a month and has more than six million followers across YouTube and Facebook as of 2024. He had originally set up the channel to educate fellow farm workers and to share videos of specific trims with explanations, before reaching a much wider audience.

In 2023, he was involved in the rescue of Fiona, described as "Britain's loneliest sheep", who had been stranded alone at the base of cliff in the Moray Firth for at least two years. In 2024, Parker revealed that he'd been diagnosed with ADHD and bipolar disorder.

== Selected works ==
- Parker, Graeme; Parker, Robert (2024). Bruised Sole: The Unfiltered Story of the Hoof GP. ASIN B0DMTPQ91Z.
