= Bendigo, New Zealand =

Settlement in Central Otago, New Zealand

Coordinates: 44.926°S 169.344°E

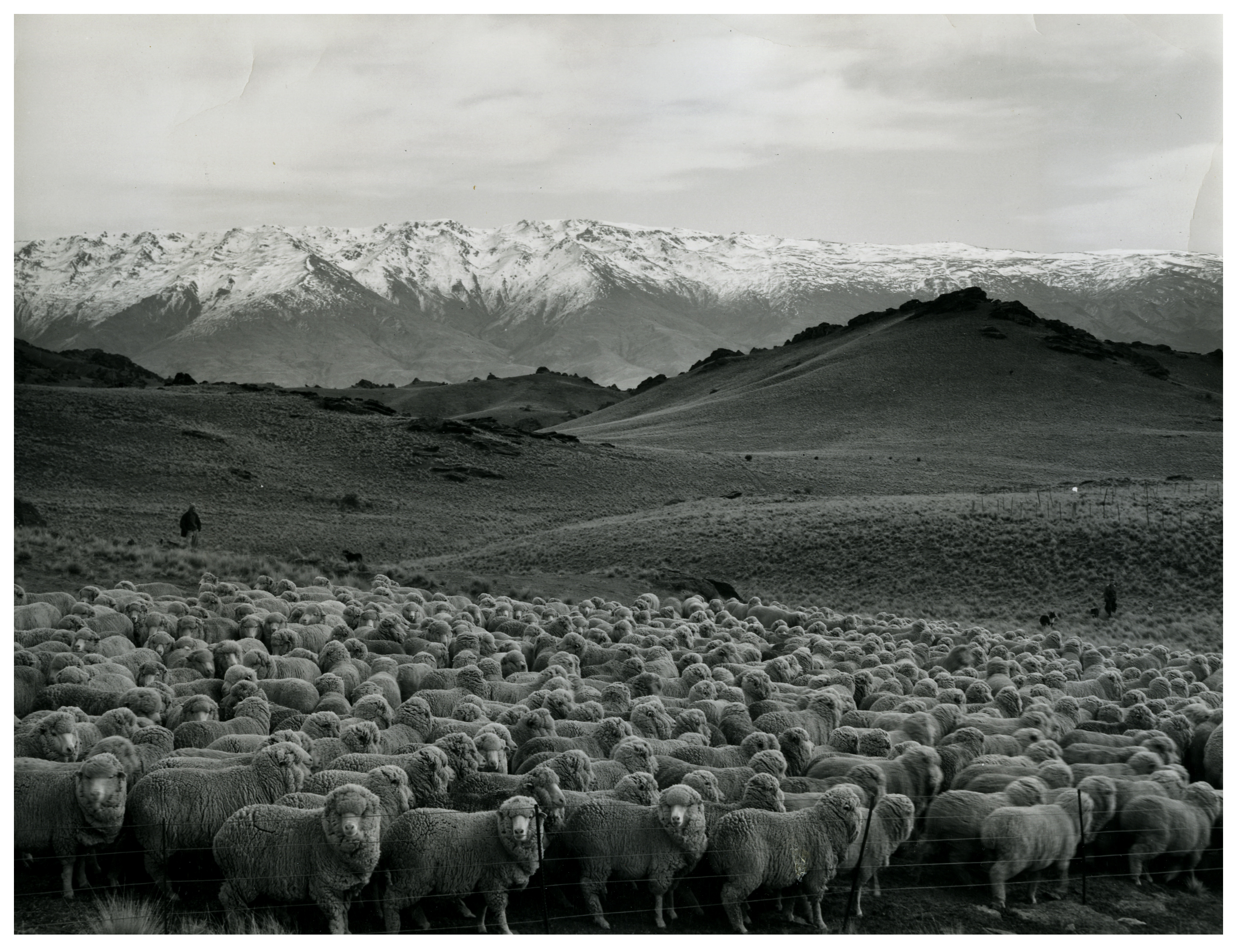
Sheep mustering, Bendigo Station, 1965

Bendigo is a settlement in Central Otago, South Island of New Zealand. It is located some 20 kilometres to the north of Cromwell, to the east of the head of Lake Dunstan, on the banks of the Bendigo Creek, a small tributary of the Clutha River.

In pre-European times, the area was not widely used, though an established Māori trail ran through it. Remains of pounamu weapons have been found in the area, as has a waka paddle (now in the collection of the Otago Museum) and the remains of some moa egg shells, all suggesting it may have been used as a temporary camping area.

Bendigo first achieved notability in the 1860s, during the Otago gold rush. Gold was discovered at Bendigo Creek in 1862. The Bendigo Goldfields around the original Bendigo settlement became one of the country's richest, yielding an estimated 15 to 50 ounces (0.4 to 1.4 kg) of gold per week. The initial alluvial gold was rapidly played out, but quartz reefs bearing the precious metal were discovered by Thomas Logan in 1863 and many mine shafts were sunk into the rock during the 1860s. By the mid 1870s, the reef was considered New Zealand's richest. Mining continued in the area until the 1940s. The settlement's name is a relic of this time, having been transplanted from the Australian town of the same name by gold miners who had travelled from the Victorian goldfields.

The remains of the gold field, which was rapidly played out, have been largely preserved, and form the basis of the 1,085 hectare Bendigo Historic Reserve. The reserve contains numerous walkways and includes the remains of mineshafts, water races, stamping batteries and the remains of several now-deserted settlement buildings.

== Bendigo wine sub-region ==
Today, Bendigo's economy is based on tourism and wine. The area around Bendigo is one of the major subregions of the Central Otago wine region, with several top wineries and vineyards. As with other parts of the wine region, the main grape variety in the area is pinot noir.

=== Bendigo ===
- Aurora Vineyard
- Bendigo Station (tasting room in Tarras)
- Clutha Ridge
- Constellation Brands
- Lamont (has changed ownership - new name TBA)
- Folding Hill
- Gibbston Valley Wines (tasting room and winery in Gibbston)
- Misha's Vineyard
- Moko Hills
- Mondillo
- Mud House Wines
- Nanny Goat Wines (tasting room in Queensberry)
- Peregrine Wines (tasting room and winery in Gibbston)
- Prophet’s Rock
- Quartz Reef (tasting room and winery in Cromwell)
- Rocha Terrace (tasting room on-site coming soon 6/2/2026)
- Tarras Vineyards (tasting at The Canyon)
- Zebra NZ Vineyards (owned by Foley Wines)

=== Tarras and Māori Point ===
- Māori Point Vineyard

== Climate ==
Climate data for Bendigo (1991–2020)
Month	Jan	Feb	Mar	Apr	May	Jun	Jul	Aug	Sep	Oct	Nov	Dec	Year
Mean daily maximum °C (°F)	24.8 (76.6)	24.5 (76.1)	21.8 (71.2)	17.7 (63.9)	12.9 (55.2)	8.8 (47.8)	8.2 (46.8)	11.7 (53.1)	15.3 (59.5)	17.8 (64.0)	20.6 (69.1)	22.8 (73.0)	17.2 (63.0)
Daily mean °C (°F)	18.1 (64.6)	17.6 (63.7)	15.0 (59.0)	11.3 (52.3)	7.4 (45.3)	4.3 (39.7)	3.6 (38.5)	5.9 (42.6)	9.1 (48.4)	11.5 (52.7)	14.0 (57.2)	16.4 (61.5)	11.2 (52.1)
Mean daily minimum °C (°F)	11.4 (52.5)	10.8 (51.4)	8.2 (46.8)	4.8 (40.6)	1.9 (35.4)	−0.2 (31.6)	−1.1 (30.0)	0.1 (32.2)	2.9 (37.2)	5.2 (41.4)	7.4 (45.3)	10.1 (50.2)	5.1 (41.2)
Average rainfall mm (inches)	39.0 (1.54)	31.9 (1.26)	45.1 (1.78)	27.5 (1.08)	30.7 (1.21)	35.0 (1.38)	30.9 (1.22)	25.7 (1.01)	18.0 (0.71)	34.6 (1.36)	29.1 (1.15)	42.9 (1.69)	390.4 (15.39)
Source: NIWA
