= Acacia caesaneura =

Western blue mulga

Conservation status
- Least Concern (IUCN 3.1)

Scientific classification
- Kingdom: Plantae
- Clade: Tracheophytes
- Clade: Angiosperms
- Clade: Eudicots
- Clade: Rosids
- Order: Fabales
- Family: Fabaceae
- Subfamily: Caesalpinioideae
- Clade: Mimosoid clade
- Genus: Acacia
- Species: A. caesaneura

Binomial name
- Acacia caesaneura Maslin & J.E.Reid
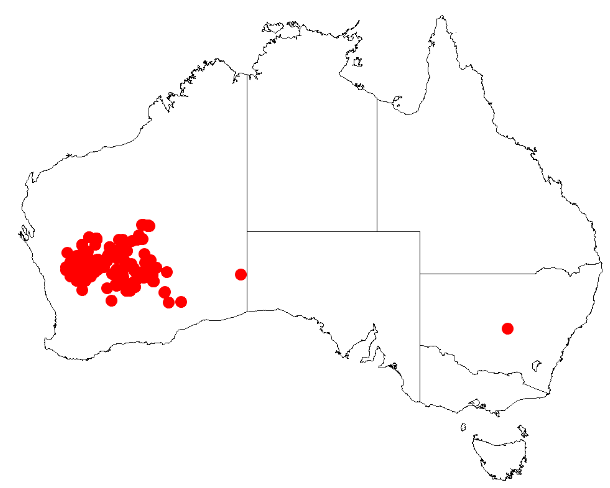
- Occurrence data from AVH

Synonyms
- Acacia aneura var. argentea Pedley nom. inval.; Acacia aneura var. argentea Pedley; Racosperma aneurum var. argenteum (Pedley) Pedley

Species of legume

Acacia caesaneura, commonly known as western blue mulga, is a species of flowering plant in the family Fabaceae and is endemic to inland Western Australia. It is a multi-stemmed shrub with a silvery bluish grey crown, mostly narrowly oblong to elliptic phyllodes, cylindrical spikes of golden yellow flowers, and winged, firmly papery pods.

== Description ==
Acacia caesaneura is a multi-stemmed shrub that typically grows to a height of 3–8 m (9.8–26.2 ft), growing to a cone-shape with a dense, bluish-grey or grey-green crown. The branchlets are densely covered with soft hairs. Its phyllodes are variably shaped, mostly straight, often narrowly oblong to elliptic and not rigid, mostly 30–70 m (98–230 ft) long and 2.5–10 mm (0.098–0.394 in) wide with many veins. The flowers are borne in cylindrical spike 10–20 mm (0.39–0.79 in) long on peduncles 2–10 mm (0.079–0.394 in) long. Flowering has been recorded in March, July, August, October and November, and the pods are oblong, 15–35 mm (0.59–1.38 in) long and 10–15 mm (0.39–0.59 in) wide with wings, 1–2 mm (0.039–0.079 in) wide. The seeds are 4–6 mm (0.16–0.24 in) long and 2–3 mm (0.079–0.118 in) wide with a small, whitish aril.

== Taxonomy ==
Acacia caesaneura was first formally described in 2012 by Bruce Maslin and Jordan E. Reid near the Paynes Find to Sandstone road in 2007. The specific epithet (caesaneura) means 'blue-grey', referring to the phyllodes.

== Distribution and habitat ==
Western blue mulga is found on plains or in undulating country in the Avon Wheatbelt, Coolgardie, Gascoyne, Great Victoria Desert, Murchison, Nullarbor and Yalgoo bioregions of inland Western Australia where it grows on red-brown sandy loam to clay soils, sometimes over hardpan in shrubland or woodland communities. The bulk of the population is found from around Yalgoo in the west to around Meekatharra in the north down to around Kalgoorlie in the south extending to around the northern edge of the Nullarbor Plain in the east.

== Conservation status ==
Acacia caesaneura is listed as "not threatened" by the Government of Western Australia Department of Biodiversity, Conservation and Attractions.

== See also ==
- List of Acacia species
