= Chris (sheep) =

Sheep with record-setting fleece

- Chris, before and after shearing
- Species: Ovis aries (domestic sheep)
- Breed: Merino
- Sex: Male
- Born: July 2010
- Died: 22 October 2019 (aged 9)

Chris (July 2010 – 22 October 2019) was a Merino ram who gained international fame in September 2015 after being shorn of a record amount of wool in Canberra, Australia. Chris was named after a sheep character in the sitcom Father Ted (specifically from the episode "Chirpy Burpy Cheap Sheep") by local Bonner resident Sue Dowling, who spotted the sheep wandering in a paddock near the Bonner district in Canberra.

== Discovery and shearing ==
Chris was found at Mulligan's Flat near the border of New South Wales and the Australian Capital Territory (ACT). His mobility had been impaired as a result of the weight of the fleece he had grown over more than five years. Domestic sheep like Chris raised for their wool have been bred not to lose their coat and need to be shorn regularly, so leaving the sheep unshorn would have put the animal at great risk of infection and/or injury.

Four-time Australian Shearing Championship winner Ian Elkins volunteered to shear the massive ram after being contacted by RSPCA Australia. Chris had to be sedated throughout the procedure, during which the shearer removed up to 40.45 kilograms (89.2 lb) of thick wool after working about 42 minutes.

Australian sheep are usually shorn annually and their fleeces usually weigh about 5 kilograms (11 lb). Chris's fleece set a world record, beating previous records held by other runaway sheep such as Shrek (27 kilograms (60 lb)) and "Big Ben". Chris's record fleece of 41.4 kilograms (91 lb) was confirmed by Guinness World Records, but the length of the fleece (42 centimetres (17 in)) meant it had no commercial value. It was estimated that Chris's fleece was enough to make 30 jumpers.

== Adoption and life at Little Oak Sanctuary ==
Chris was put up for adoption by the RSPCA, who reported that the sheep needed to recover from his operation and adjust to a life without a "cumbersome blanket of wool", although his hind legs may have suffered some permanent imbalance from years of bearing the extra weight. Hundreds of people offered to adopt Chris but in September 2015 he was adopted by the Little Oak Sanctuary in New South Wales, where he gradually became more confident with people. The co-founder of the sanctuary reported that he liked having his head scratched.

== Death and legacy ==
Chris died of natural causes aged 9 on 22 October 2019.

In 2016, Chris's complete fleece, measuring 160 centimetres (63 in) long by 110 centimetres (43 in) wide, was acquired by the National Museum of Australia, where it was put on display and has become a popular exhibit.

A children's picture book about Chris's life after he was separated from his flock and before he was rescued was written by the RSPCA and illustrated by Kylie Fogarty. Entitled The Misadventures of Chris the Sheep, the story offered young readers a possible explanation for why he grew so big. The book was an effort "to educate children about animal welfare" and proceeds from its sale went to help the RSPCA in the ACT to continue its work protecting, rescuing, caring and advocating for animals in need.

In 2022, an exhausted lost sheep was found on Mount Alexander in Victoria. Named Alex after the mountain on which he was found, the weight of the wool had created critical health problems for him as it had for Chris. Alex was carrying 40 kgs of unshorn wool, only slightly less than Chris. After the emergency shearing that he needed to save his life, he made a full recovery and joined a local animal shelter.

== See also ==
- Agriculture in Australia
