= Fruitland =

Fruitland may refer to:

- Fruitland, California
- Fruitland, Georgia
- Fruitland, Idaho
- Fruitland, Iowa
- Fruitland, Maryland
- Fruitland, Missouri
- Fruitland, New Mexico
- Fruitland Township, Michigan
- Fruitland, Utah
- Fruitland, Washington

"Fruitland" is also a part of the name of:

- Fruitland Park, Florida
- Fruitland Park, Mississippi
- Upper Fruitland, New Mexico
- Fruitland formation, geological deposit in New Mexico and Colorado

== See also ==
- Fruitlands
