= Sonny Wool =

Sheep (2008–2020)

Sonny Wool (2008–2020) was a sheep from the North Island of New Zealand. Born in Dannevirke circa 2008, he was named after All Black Sonny Bill Williams. He became famous after his feeding behaviour was used to correctly predict the winner of each of the New Zealand national rugby union team's matches at the 2011 Rugby World Cup. His role at the 2011 Rugby World Cup was compared to that of Paul the Octopus at the 2010 FIFA World Cup.

Sonny Wool's owner was Beverley Dowling. His agent was Dan Boyd, who also designed the sheep's prediction process. The prediction process was designed so that Sonny Wool was presented with two boxes containing feed in the form of hay, each box marked on the outside with the flag of a national rugby union team in a forthcoming match. His choice of which hay to eat first was interpreted as indicating his prediction of a win for the country whose flag was on that box. Selections by the sheep were correct in all of New Zealand's matches in the 2011 Rugby World Cup, though predictions for the other three quarter-finals turned out to be incorrect.

Sonny Wool had his own website, Facebook and Twitter accounts. He was reported to be under 24-hour security watch after receiving death threats.

== Personality ==
According to Dan Boyd, as a lamb, Sonny Wool predicted when it was going to rain. His manager described him as "a bit socially inept" who prefers the company of humans and has "got a few fetishes for things – one is light at night and he really likes rugby balls".

== Results ==
=== 2011 Rugby World Cup ===
Teams	Stage	Date	Prediction	Result	Outcome
New Zealand vs Tonga	Pool stage	9 September	New Zealand	41–10	Correct
New Zealand vs Japan	Pool stage	16 September	New Zealand	83–7	Correct
New Zealand vs France	Pool stage	24 September	New Zealand	37–17	Correct
New Zealand vs Canada	Pool stage	2 October	New Zealand	79–15	Correct
Ireland vs Wales	Quarter-finals	8 October	Ireland	10–22	Incorrect
England vs France	Quarter-finals	8 October	England	12–19	Incorrect
South Africa vs Australia	Quarter-finals	9 October	South Africa	9–11	Incorrect
New Zealand vs Argentina	Quarter-finals	9 October	New Zealand	33–10	Correct
New Zealand vs Australia	Semi-finals	16 October	New Zealand	20–6	Correct
New Zealand vs France	Final	23 October	New Zealand	8–7	Correct

== See also ==
- Sheep
- Similar oracles
- Shrek (sheep)
