= Mullock =

Mullock is a surname. Notable people with the surname include:

- John T. Mullock (1807–1869), Roman Catholic bishop of St. John's, Newfoundland
- Julia Mullock (1928–2017), former wife of the former Korean royalty Yi Ku
- Richard Mullock (1851–1920), Welsh sporting administrator and official
- Mullock may also refer to waste tailings from metal ore mining.
