= Fiona (sheep) =

Stranded sheep in Scotland

Fiona is a sheep that came to public attention in 2021 when she was spotted alone at the base of a cliff on the shore of the Moray Firth in Scotland.

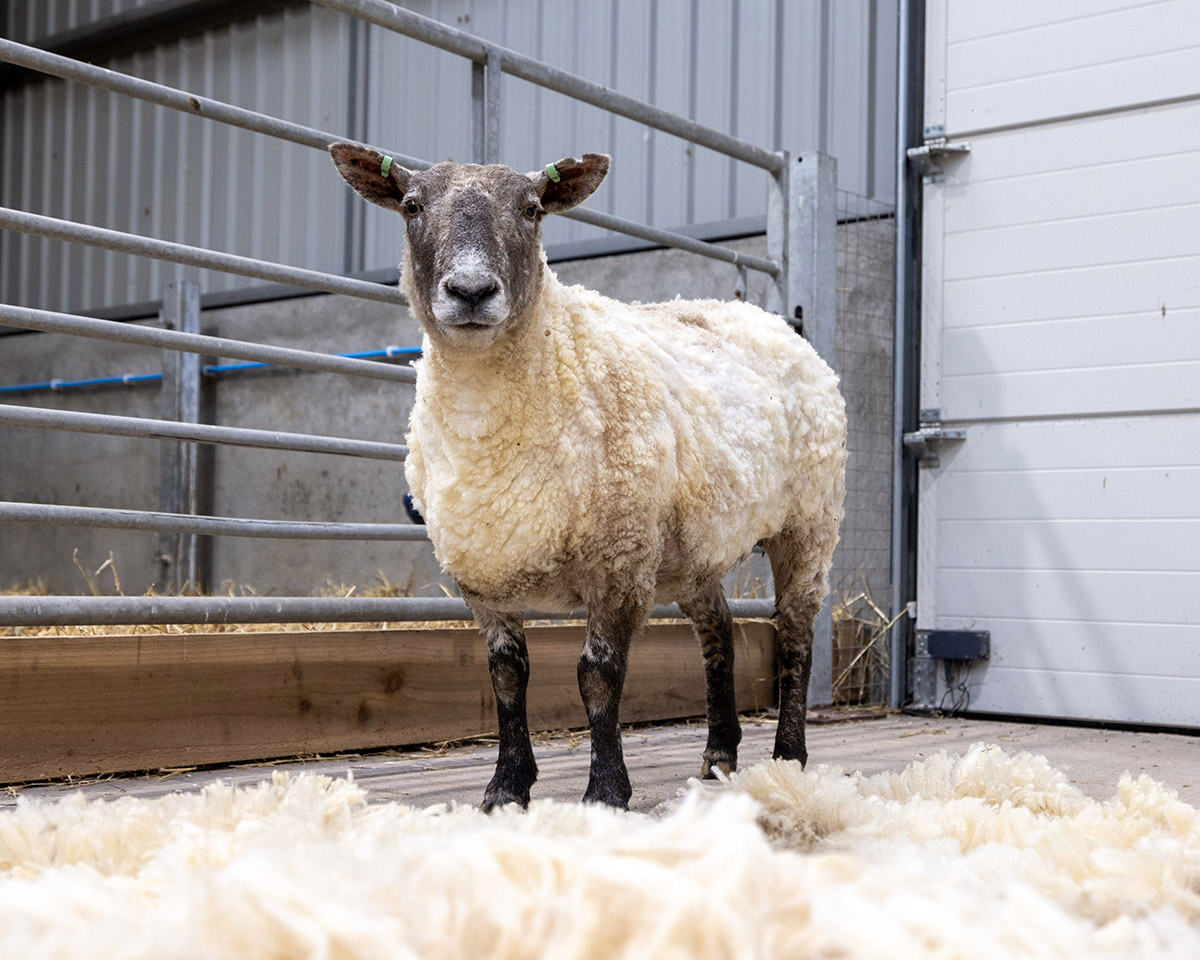
Fiona the Sheep

In 2021, Jill Turner was kayaking between Balintore and Nigg and about to enter the Cromarty Firth from the Moray Firth when she spotted the sheep. She subsequently saw the sheep in 2023 at the same location, with a much overgrown fleece. Turner said that the sheep bleated to her and her fellow kayakers. She contacted several organisations with the aim of helping the sheep up the steep cliffs of the firth. The sheep became national news in October 2023.

The chief superintendent of the Scottish Society for Prevention of Cruelty to Animals (Scottish SPCA), Mike Flynn, said that it was aware of the sheep and that it had "ample grazing" despite its being stuck on the bottom of the cliffs. It was not known to whom the sheep belonged. A petition for her rescue garnered in excess of 52,000 signatures.

In 2021 it was believed that the sheep would find its way to the fields above the cliffs.

On 3 November the sheep, now called Fiona, was rescued from the bottom of the cliffs by local farmers Als Couzens, Graeme Parker, James Parker, and Ally Williamson, led by the Ayrshire sheep shearer and BBC television presenter Cammy Wilson. A winch at the top of the cliffs was operated by two of the farmers, while three others descended 250 metres (820 feet) down the cliff. Fiona was found in a cave. She was then inspected by an inspector from the Scottish SPA and described as being in good condition, though needing shearing.

Wilson said that Fiona was in an "incredible condition ... She is about a condition score of about 4.5, she is overfat – it was some job lifting her up that slope". He said that "The only difference between us being heroes and idiots is a slip of the foot". He said that he would do it again but "maybe not tomorrow though because I'm knackered". Wilson said that he was motivated to rescue Fiona after reading disparaging comments online about the farmer that owned her. The farmer had previously tried to retrieve her from the shoreline at the base of the cliffs but was unable to do so without risking his and his employees' safety. When rescued, Fiona weighed 92 kilograms (203 lb) without her wool which weighed 9 kilograms (20 lb) and was of poor quality.

Fiona was moved to a new permanent home at Dalscone Farm park, near Dumfries.

A short film of Fiona's rescue was made available on The Sheep Game YouTube channel on 12 November 2023. The rescue of Fiona was broadcast on BBC Scotland's Landward programme on 16 November.

In December 2023 Fiona was used as the figurehead for a mental health campaign about loneliness for the Royal Scottish Agricultural Benevolent Institution (RSABI) and the Scottish Association of Young Farmers Clubs.

Fiona became a mother for the first time on February 10, 2026 to twins, a ewe and ram both named after characters from the Shrek movie franchise. The labour took nine hours. She has reportedly taken to motherhood wonderfully. Dalscone farm has said her babies will stay with her.
