= Tarras =

- Village
- Location of Tarras within New Zealand
- Coordinates: 44°50′S 169°25′E
- Country: New Zealand
- Region: Otago
- Territorial authority: Central Otago District
- Elevation: 290 m (950 ft)
- Time zone: UTC+12 (NZST)
  - Summer (DST): UTC+13 (NZDT)
- Area code: 03
- Local iwi: Ngāi Tahu

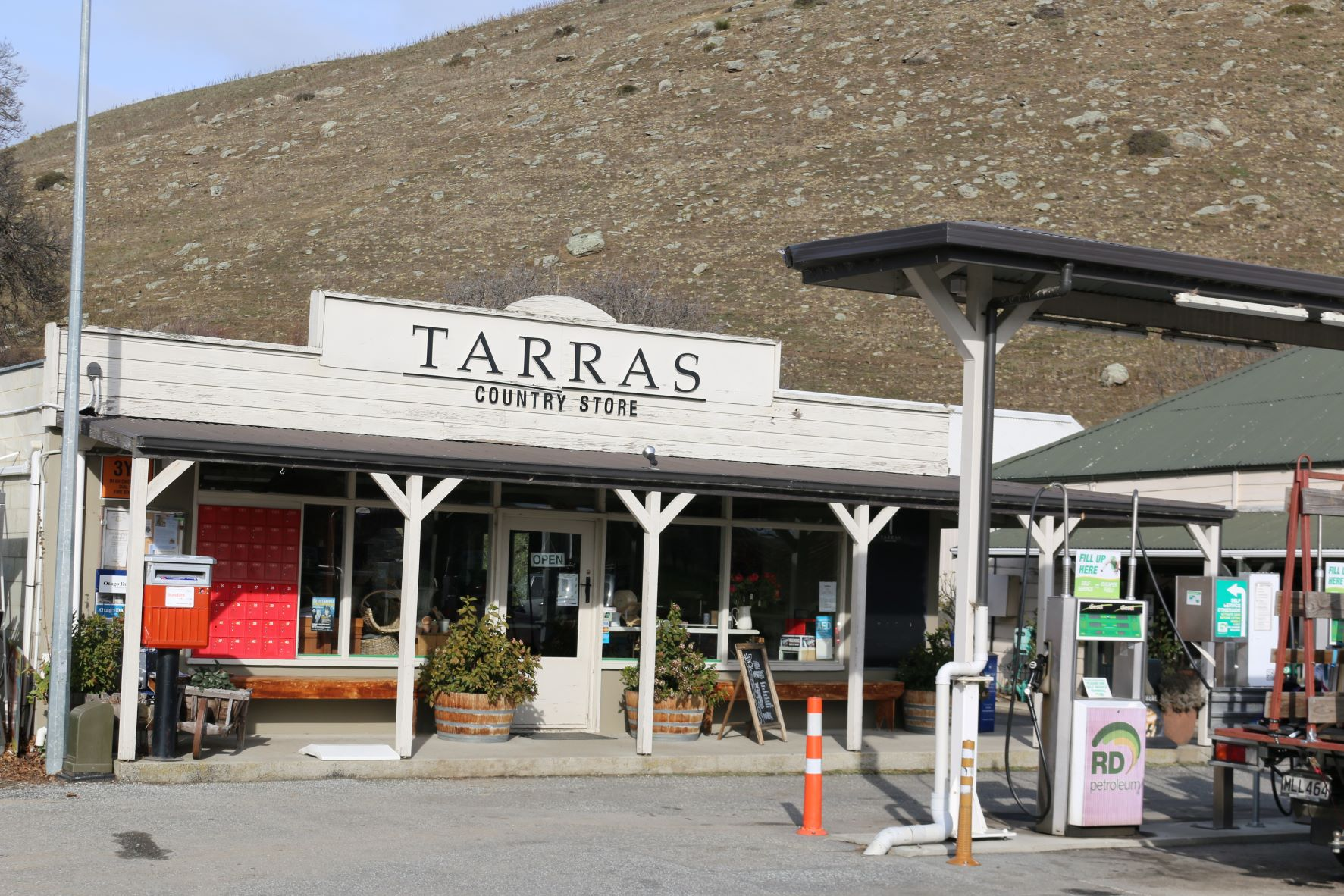
Tarras (July 2021)

Tarras is a small farming settlement in Central Otago, in the South Island of New Zealand.

Tarras is located on the slopes above the upper reaches of the Clutha Valley, on State Highway 8. It is the first village reached by travellers heading south through the Lindis Pass, and is close to the junction where travellers from Aoraki / Mount Cook turn west towards Lake Hāwea, Wānaka, and Haast Pass / Tioripatea.

== Farming and agriculture ==
Most farms in the Tarras district run sheep, principally merino farmed for their super-fine wool. Some also raise other sheep breeds and deer. Many farms have converted to beef cattle since the 2010 introduction of large-scale irrigation.

Shrek, a hermit Merino sheep, was caught in the hills of Tarras on 15 April 2004, after hiding away in caves for six years. He was shorn live on national television, to produce fleece for men's coats. Shrek was euthanised on 6 June 2011 on a veterinarian's advice, at the age of 16.

Vineyards have been established in the area since 2000. The vineyards grow mainly pinot noir and riesling grapes, with some plantings of pinot gris. Tarras vineyards include Māori Point Vineyard and Swallows Crossing Vineyard. They are formally classified as being in the Bendigo sub-region of the Central Otago wine region.

== Sunny and dry climate ==
Tarras is one of the driest areas in New Zealand, with annual rainfall of between 300 and 500 millimetres (12 and 20 in).

The valley around Tarras is the sunniest in Otago, with over 2,100 sunshine hours per year. The valley is hot in summer, with a median average daily temperature over 22 °C (72 °F), and cold in winter: the median average daily minimum is then below −2 °C (28 °F).

== Community ==
The Anglican and Presbyterian Tarras Church includes kneelers created to celebrate the centennial of New Zealand women's suffrage.

Tarras Rural Women publish the community newsletter, Tarras Talk.

The Tarras Tearooms is a historic waystation for travellers through the Lindis Pass.

== Education ==
Tarras School is a co-educational state primary school for Year 1 to 8 students, with a roll of 31 as of July 2026.

The school has published a children's books about Shrek the sheep to raise funds for the school and its students. The book was written by school children and edited by teachers and parents.

== International airport proposal ==
In July 2022, an investigative journalist revealed that Christchurch Airport had been secretly buying up farmland between highways SH 8 and SH 8a next to Tarras, with the intention of creating a new international airport. After the airport company was forced to announce their plans, there was widespread concern within the community and indeed throughout Central Otago about the proposed airport.
