= Fruitlands, New Zealand =

Fruitlands
- Settlement
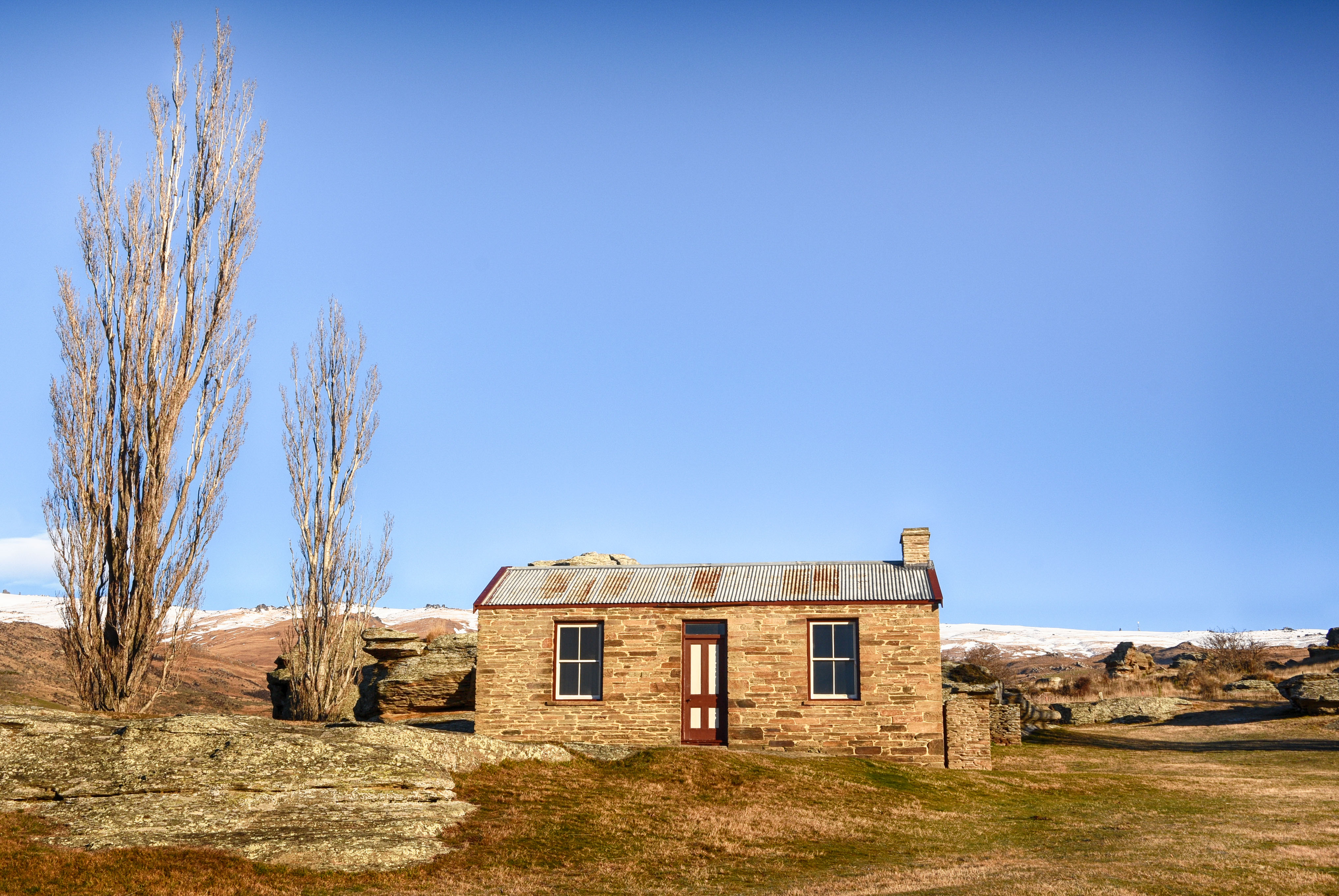
- Mitchell's Cottage in Symes Road is registered as a Category I heritage building by Heritage New Zealand

- Location within New Zealand
- Coordinates: 45.313°S 169.301°E
- Country: New Zealand
- Region: Otago
- Territorial authority: Central Otago District
- Time zone: UTC+12 (NZST)
  - Summer (DST): UTC+13 (NZDT)
- Local iwi: Ngāi Tahu

Fruitlands, originally known as Bald Hill Flat, is a settlement in Central Otago in the Otago region of New Zealand.

It is situated on State Highway 8, 14 km southwest of Alexandra, and 27 km northeast of Roxburgh. Fruitlands was initially settled a gold mining town following a gold rush in the early 1860s.

== History ==
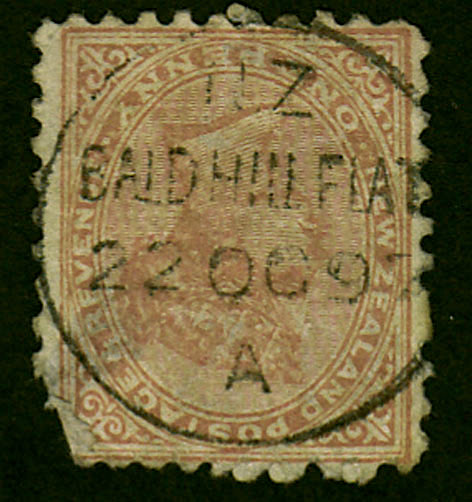
1897 postmark of Bald Hill Flat

Fruitlands was initially known as "Bald Hill Flat" following a gold rush to the area in August 1863. Miners Andrew Drew and Ben Buchanan were getting an ounce of gold in 30 buckets from a depth of only a foot below the surface. In the next few years the whole of Bald Hill Flat was prospected with small amounts of gold recovered from shallow depths almost everywhere.

Bald Hill Flat was initially an outlying part of Teviot Station before the gold rush of 1863. Following the discovery of gold, it was split off the Teviot run and subdivided into sections for lease.

Bald Hill Flat was renamed Fruitlands in 1915, in recognition of it becoming a fruit growing area. The establishment of orchards turned out to be abortive when only one crop of fruit was ever exported, and although there was ample summer irrigation water available, the hard winter frosts destroyed most of the trees.

Once a community with school, post office and Roman-Catholic church, today the area is a collection of modern farm houses, and the remains of miners' stone cottages; some derelict, others restored. Fine examples of restored houses are John Mitchell's cottage, and the Speargrass Inn, formerly the Speargrass Hotel.
