= Quartz reef mining =

Type of gold mining in veins of quartz

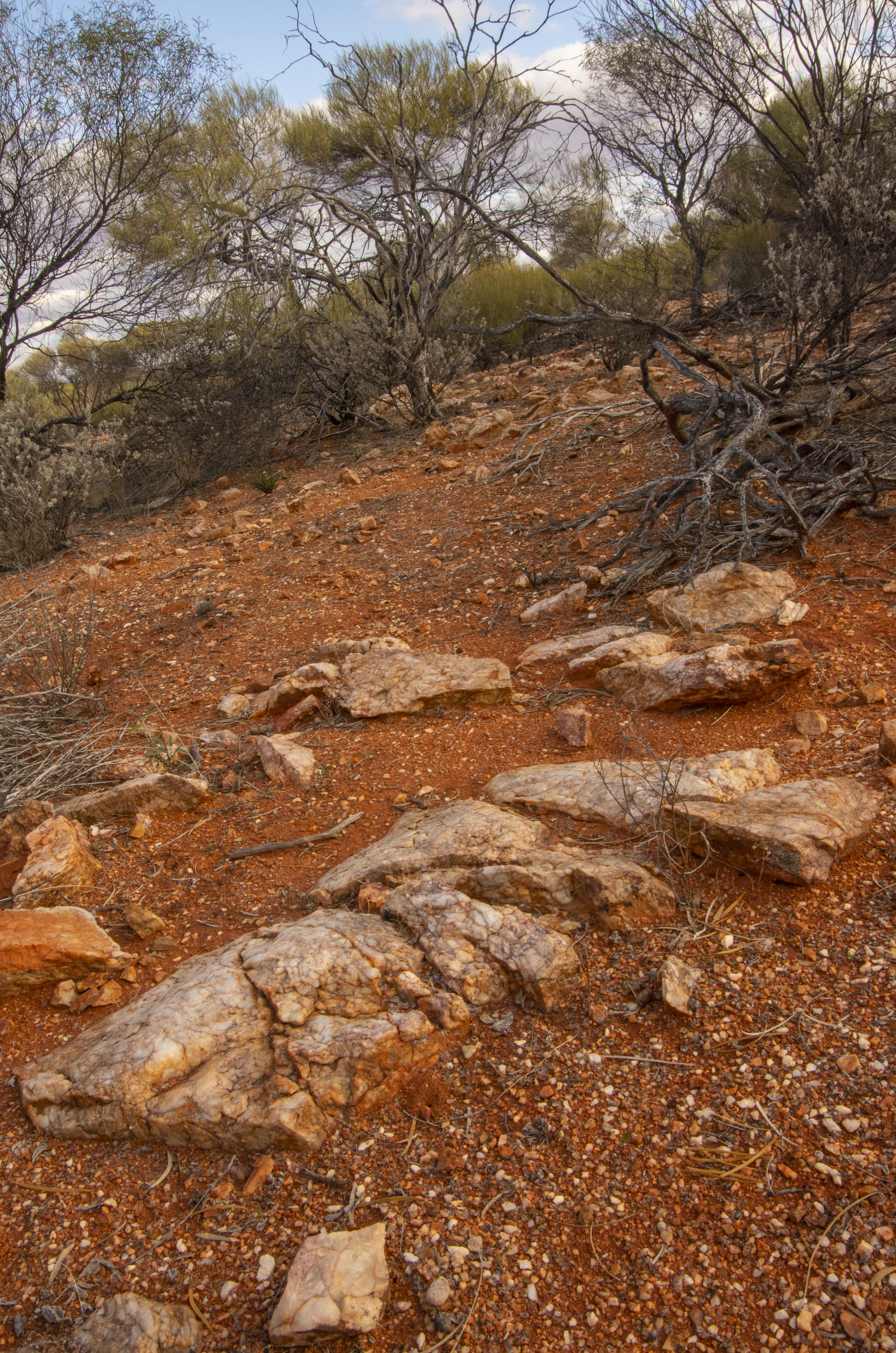
Quartz reef breaking the surface at Paynes Find, Western Australia

Quartz reef mining is a type of gold mining in "reefs" (veins) of quartz. Quartz is one of the most common minerals in the Earth's crust, and most quartz veins do not carry gold, but those that have gold are avidly hunted by prospectors. In the shallow, oxidized zones of quartz reef deposits, the gold occurs in its metallic state, and is easily recovered with simple equipment. Quartz reef mining played an important role in 19th century gold-mining districts such as Bendigo, Victoria in Australia, Central Otago in New Zealand, and the California mother lode.

== Mining ==
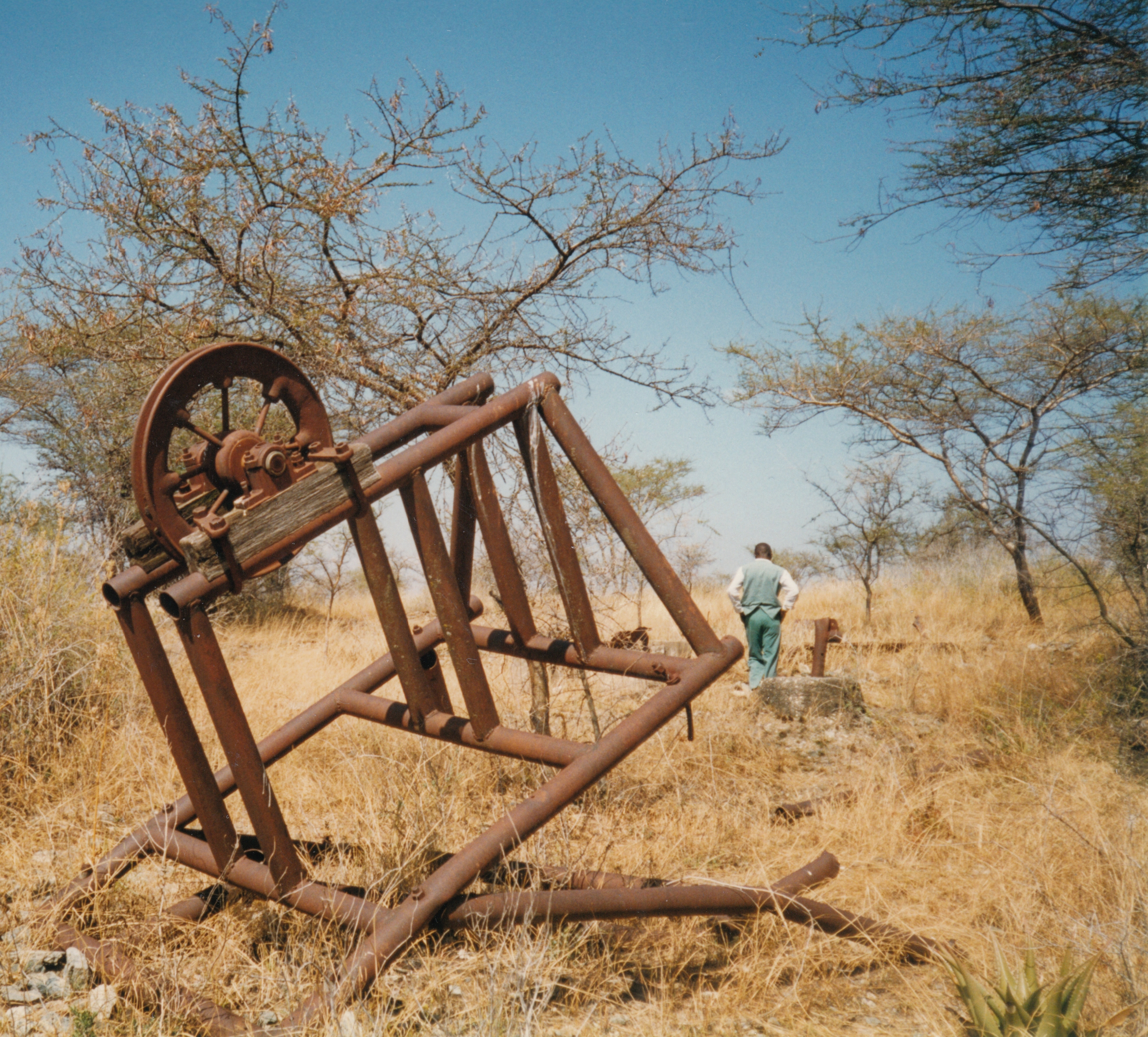
Headframe with gin wheel. Abandoned Kilimafeza gold mine, Serengeti NP, Tanzania

Mining the ore usually required mine shafts sunk to mine quartz from the reefs, sometimes deep underground. Horizontal tunnels called drifts were dug out from the shaft at different levels to find the gold-bearing rock.

All the ore was hoisted to the surface for processing. Water had to be removed by pumping. Big hoisting engines were installed to hoist lifts and buckets up the shafts.

On the surface above the shaft stands a building known as the headframe. This contained a wheel called a gin wheel which lifted buckets of rock up to a raised platform called a brace. Wheeled buckets then carried the rock along elevated tracks to waste dumps or processing works. The steel cable that hoisted the bucket passed over the gin wheel.

== Processing ==
The gold was brought to the surface as small particles embedded in lumps of quartz. The quartz was then crushed into a fine dust by stamping batteries in a stamp mill. A stamp battery contained a row of stamps. On the bottom of each stamp was a heavy piece of iron or steel. Each battery was driven by a cam shaft which was turned by a water wheel. The steel shoes went up and down between wooden guides and pounded the quartz which had been fed into steel boxes underneath the stampers. Ideally the stamping batteries would work 24 hours a day.

After crushing, the quartz was mixed with water to make mud which then ran down sloping tables, called concentrating tables. On top of these tables were copper sheets coated with mercury, which amalgamates with gold. The gold particles stuck to the mercury, and could be collected from there. In more recent times, gold has been recovered by the cyanide process, instead of using mercury-coated plates.

== Quartz mines ==
- Victoria Quartz mine, Bendigo, Victoria, Australia (Its deepest shaft used to mine a quartz reef was almost a kilometre and a half deep.)
- Central Deborah Gold Mine, Bendigo (The mine still stands today. Mining began in 1938, and was continuous for 16 years. It was a deep reef quartz goldmine. During the working life of the mine, 60,000 tonnes of quartz was brought to the surface, yielding 1 tonne of gold.
- Gold Hill (Nevada County, California), USA (This site of one of the first discoveries of quartz gold in California, and now California Historical Landmark No. 297: "...this discovery created the great excitement that started the development of quartz mining into a great industry."
