= Paynes Find, Western Australia =

Paynes Find
- Town
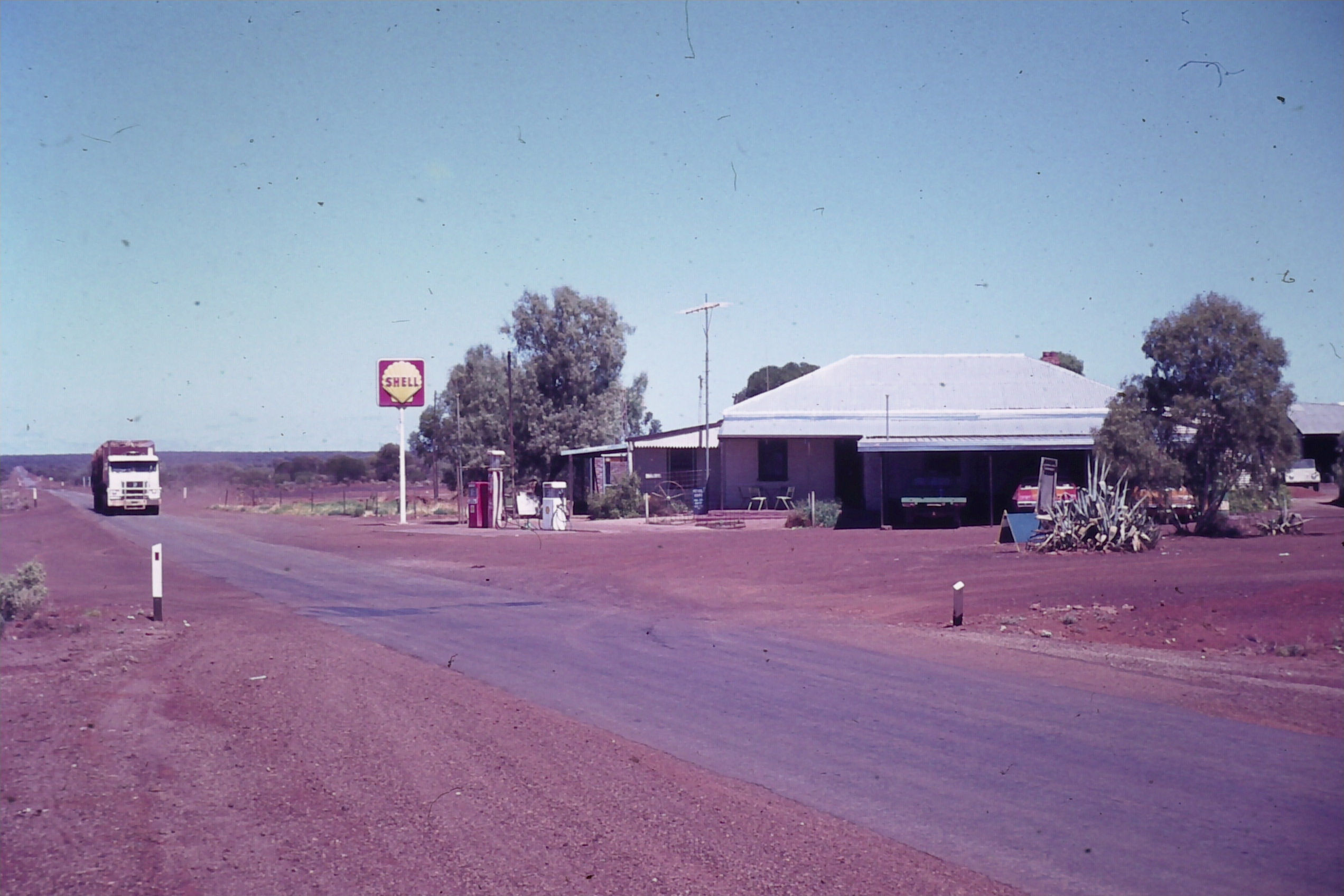
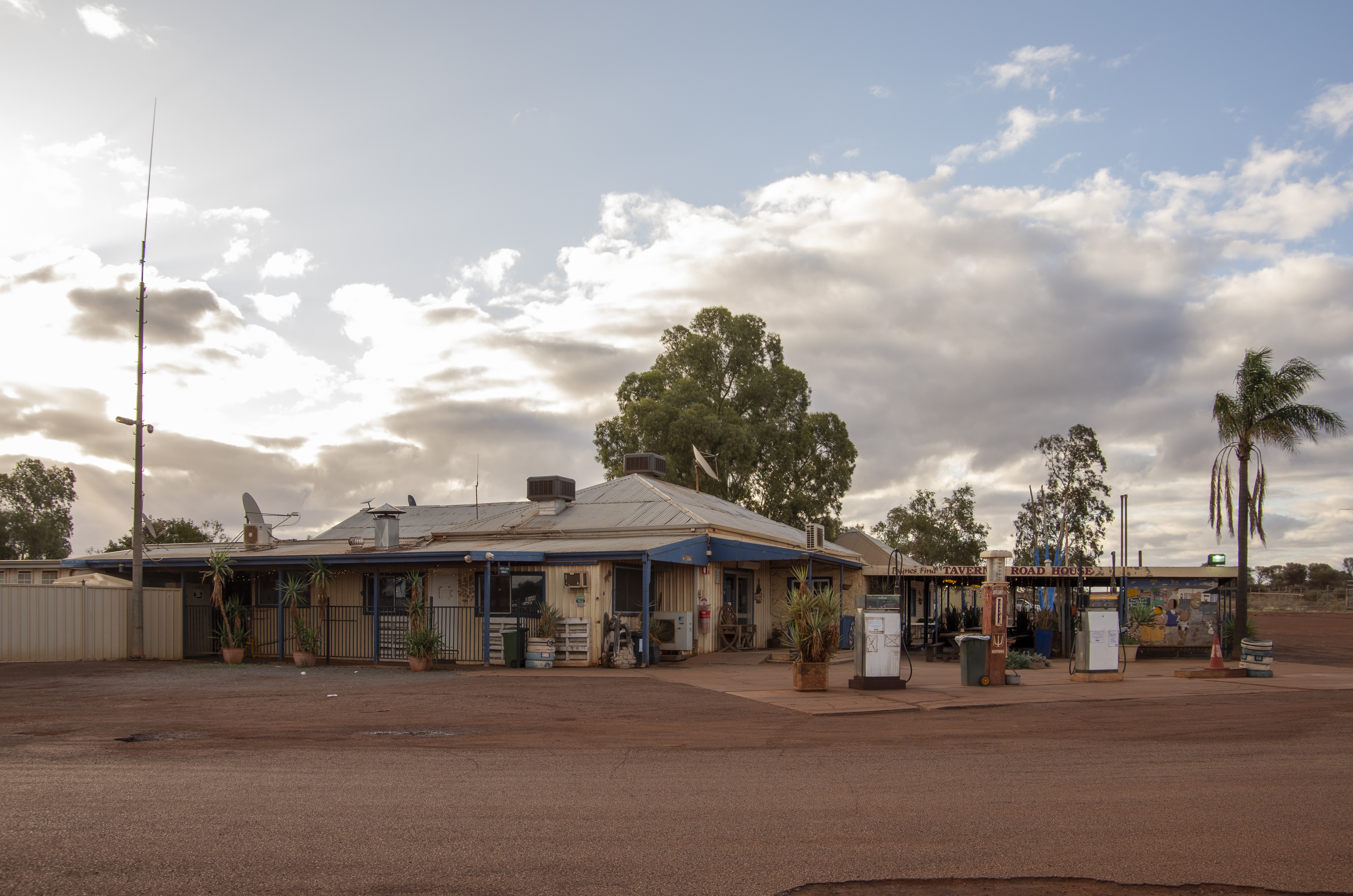
- Paynes Find c. 1980 Paynes Find September 2023

- Coordinates: 29°15′S 117°41′E
- Country: Australia
- State: Western Australia
- LGA(s): Shire of Yalgoo
- Location: 430 km (270 mi) NE of Perth; 134 km (83 mi) S of Mount Magnet; 150 km (93 mi) N of Dalwallinu
- Established: 1911

Government
  - State electorate(s): North West
  - Federal division(s): Durack

Area
  - Total: 10,951 km^{2} (4,228 sq mi)
- Elevation: 339 m (1,112 ft)

Population
  - Total(s): 26 (SAL 2021)
- Postcode: 6612
- Mean max temp: 27.7 °C (81.9 °F)
- Mean min temp: 12.8 °C (55.0 °F)
- Annual rainfall: 281.9 mm (11.10 in)

Paynes Find, also called Paynes, is a settlement approximately 430 kilometres (267 mi) northeast of Perth in the Mid West region of Western Australia. It is reachable by the Great Northern Highway. It was originally founded after the discovery of a gold bearing quartz vein; a roadhouse, a battery, and a few other buildings remain today. Alongside its fluctuating gold activity the area is known for its annual everlasting bloom, and sheep stations.

== History ==
The townsite was gazetted in 1911, the same year the gold battery was constructed. The battery is the only currently operational battery left in the state.

The town is named after the prospector, Thomas Payne, who was the first to discover gold in the area and was the first to register a lease for gold mining with the Mines Department. He was rewarded with free use of the state's gold battery and his ore was the first to be crushed using the battery. The ghost town of Paynesville is also named in his honour.

Water supply was an ongoing issue for mining at Paynes both for drinking and for the operation of the battery.

By the 1930s the town had prospered and the population was estimated at 500. In 1987 the battery was sold to the Taylor family, who use it as a tourist attraction.

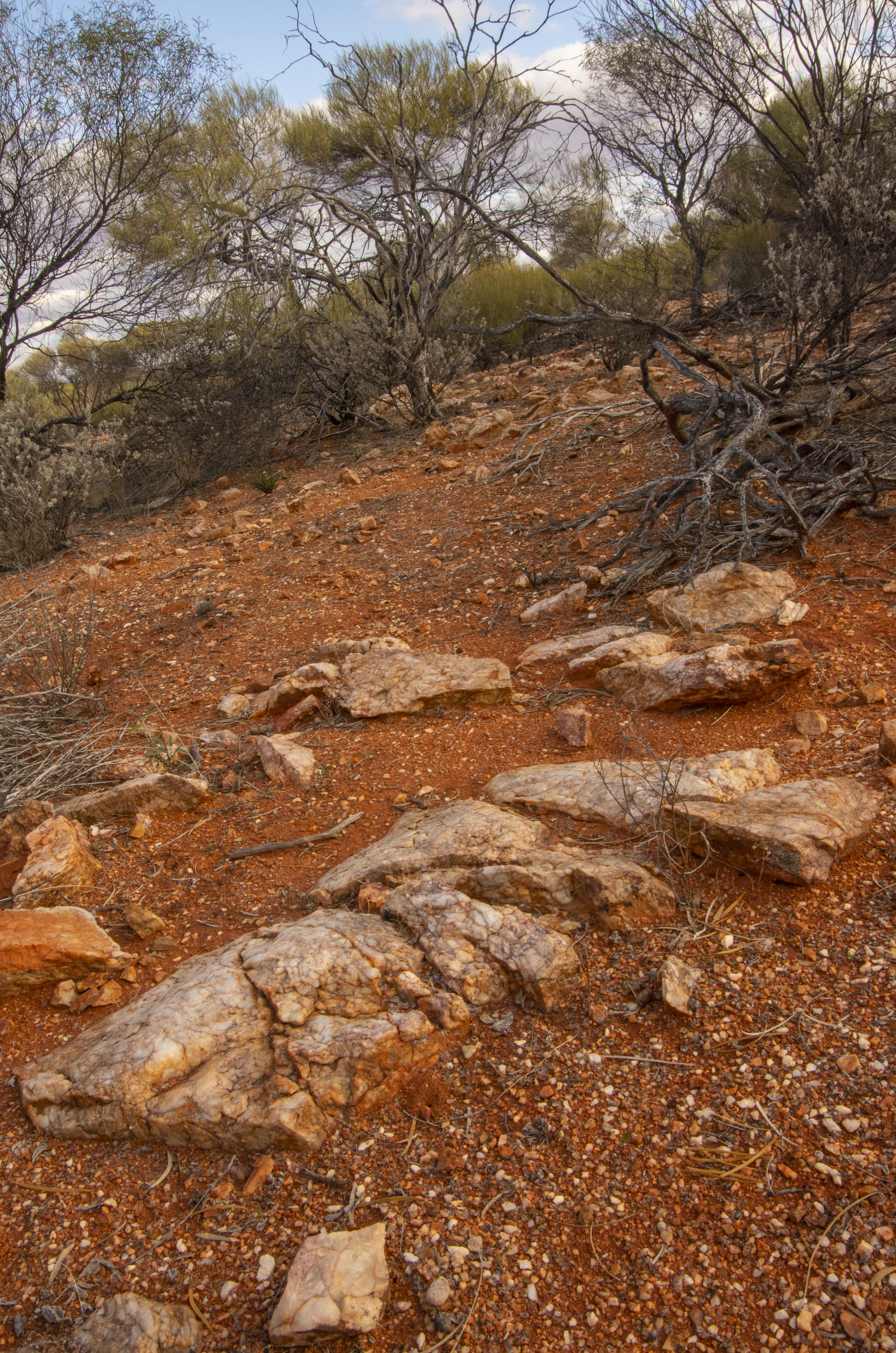
Quartz vein breaking the surface at Paynes Find that lead Thomas Payne to stake his claim

== Climate ==
Climate data for Paynes Find (1991–2020 normals, extremes 1975–present)
Month	Jan	Feb	Mar	Apr	May	Jun	Jul	Aug	Sep	Oct	Nov	Dec	Year
Record high °C (°F)	48.0 (118.4)	46.8 (116.2)	43.6 (110.5)	39.3 (102.7)	34.9 (94.8)	30.2 (86.4)	27.9 (82.2)	33.1 (91.6)	38.2 (100.8)	39.8 (103.6)	44.8 (112.6)	46.1 (115.0)	48.0 (118.4)
Mean daily maximum °C (°F)	37.5 (99.5)	36.4 (97.5)	33.0 (91.4)	28.3 (82.9)	23.5 (74.3)	19.6 (67.3)	18.9 (66.0)	20.4 (68.7)	23.8 (74.8)	28.6 (83.5)	32.2 (90.0)	35.3 (95.5)	28.1 (82.6)
Daily mean °C (°F)	29.3 (84.7)	28.8 (83.8)	25.7 (78.3)	21.2 (70.2)	16.5 (61.7)	13.2 (55.8)	12.3 (54.1)	13.3 (55.9)	16.0 (60.8)	20.3 (68.5)	24.0 (75.2)	27.1 (80.8)	20.6 (69.1)
Mean daily minimum °C (°F)	21.0 (69.8)	21.1 (70.0)	18.4 (65.1)	14.2 (57.6)	9.4 (48.9)	6.8 (44.2)	5.7 (42.3)	6.2 (43.2)	8.2 (46.8)	11.9 (53.4)	15.8 (60.4)	18.9 (66.0)	13.1 (55.6)
Record low °C (°F)	9.3 (48.7)	9.5 (49.1)	7.7 (45.9)	3.2 (37.8)	0.1 (32.2)	−4.3 (24.3)	−3.4 (25.9)	−4.2 (24.4)	−0.6 (30.9)	0.0 (32.0)	4.6 (40.3)	8.9 (48.0)	−4.3 (24.3)
Average precipitation mm (inches)	26.0 (1.02)	30.2 (1.19)	26.0 (1.02)	26.7 (1.05)	28.6 (1.13)	33.5 (1.32)	35.7 (1.41)	32.3 (1.27)	16.6 (0.65)	9.9 (0.39)	14.2 (0.56)	13.1 (0.52)	292.8 (11.53)
Average precipitation days (≥ 1 mm)	2.8	2.8	2.5	3.0	4.0	5.5	6.0	5.5	3.7	1.9	2.1	1.8	41.6
Source 1: National Oceanic and Atmospheric Administration
Source 2: Bureau of Meteorology

== In popular culture ==
The character "Dar Dar" in The Numtums was named after Dar Dar Spring near Paynes Find.
