= Bendigo-Ophir Gold Mine =

Proposed gold mining site in New Zealand

The Bendigo-Ophir Gold Project is a potential gold mining development in New Zealand. The proposed mining site is awaiting approval from an expert fast-track panel, who are expected to make a final decision on the application on 20 January 2027. The site - proposed by the Australian-owned Matakanui Gold Limited (a wholly-owned subsidiary of Santana Minerals Limited) - will be 20km north of the town of Cromwell, within the region of Central Otago in Te Waipounamu, the South Island of New Zealand. The fast-track application can be viewed on the government's fast track application portal.
