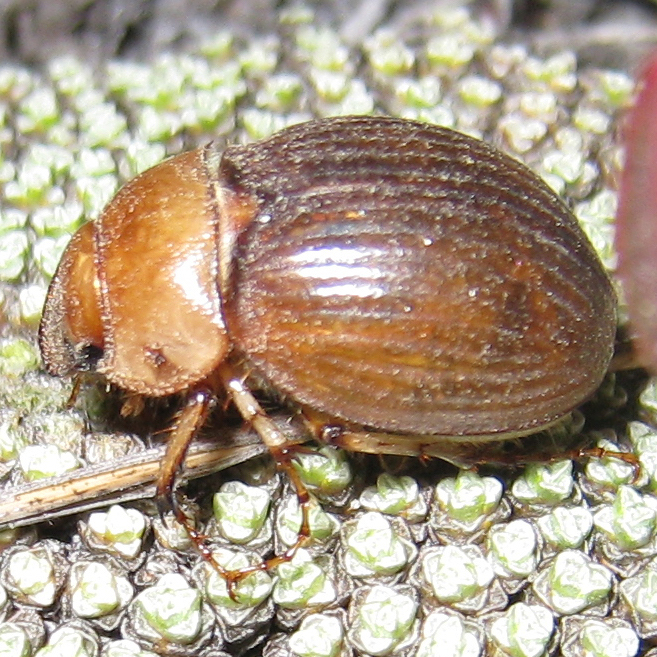

Conservation status
- Nationally Endangered (NZ TCS)

- Critically Endangered (IUCN 3.1)

Scientific classification
- Kingdom: Animalia
- Phylum: Arthropoda
- Clade: Pancrustacea
- Class: Insecta
- Order: Coleoptera
- Suborder: Polyphaga
- Infraorder: Scarabaeiformia
- Family: Scarabaeidae
- Genus: Prodontria
- Species: P. lewisii

Binomial name
- Prodontria lewisii Broun, 1904

Synonyms
- Prodontria lewisi

= Cromwell chafer beetle =

Species of beetle

The Cromwell chafer beetle (Prodontria lewisii) is a species of flightless beetle in the family Scarabaeidae. It is found in just one spot in Central Otago, New Zealand, which is now a nature reserve.

== Description and biology ==
This species was named by Broun in 1904 as Prodontria Lewisii, from "three mutilated individuals found by Mr. J. H. Lewis on the sand-hills of the Molyneaux River." Although its species epithet was lewisii, the modernised genitive of Lewis, both lewisii and lewisi are used in the scientific literature; lewisii is slightly more common.

This large beetle has pale reddish-brown elytra which are strongly convex and with deep groves passing along their length. Females are longer and wider than males, but males have a longer hind foot and tibia.

The beetles live underground. They spend at least one year as larvae, living buried in the sand and feeding on plant roots. Adults emerge on humid nights on spring and summer for a few hours to feed on lichens and plants – mostly speedwell (Veronica arvensis), sheep's sorrel (Rumex acetosella), and cushion plant (Raoulia australis) – and to mate. Males emerge slightly earlier in the year than females, on average.

== Habitat and distribution ==
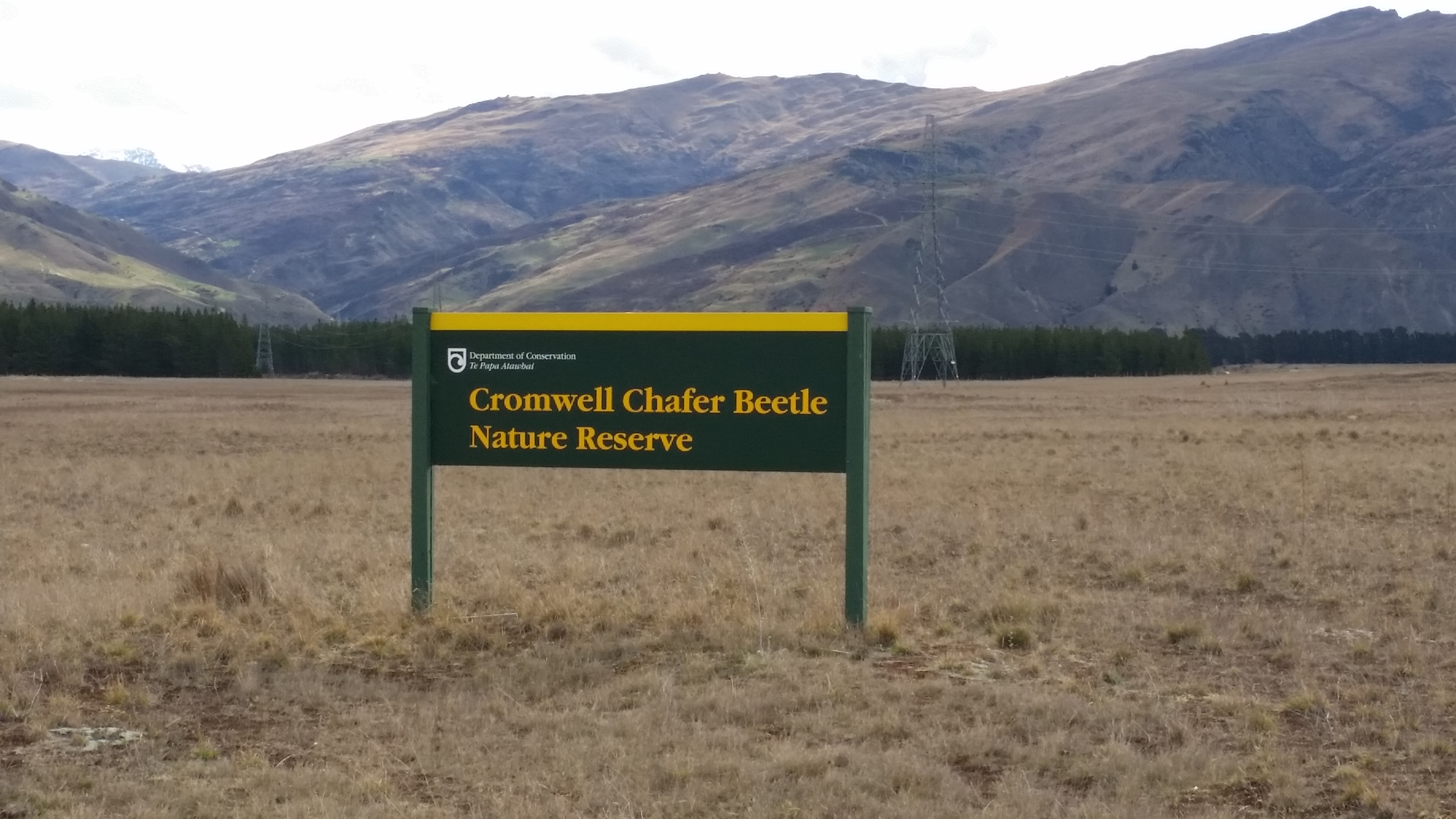
Cromwell Chafer Beetle Nature Reserve, south of Cromwell

External videos
- Meet the Locals (2007 TVNZ video, covering P. lewisi in second half)

The habitat of this beetle is an area of low sand dunes on the Cromwell river terrace, known as the "Cromwell shallow sand". The dunes are formed by loess originally deposited by the Clutha River. As P. lewisii seems to be adapted to burrowing in these inland dunes, its entire natural range was probably never more than 500 hectares.

The species is currently restricted to an 81 hectare nature reserve, between Bannockburn and Cromwell. Regular surveys of the beetle suggest they are only using 12% of the habitat available in the reserve.

== Conservation ==
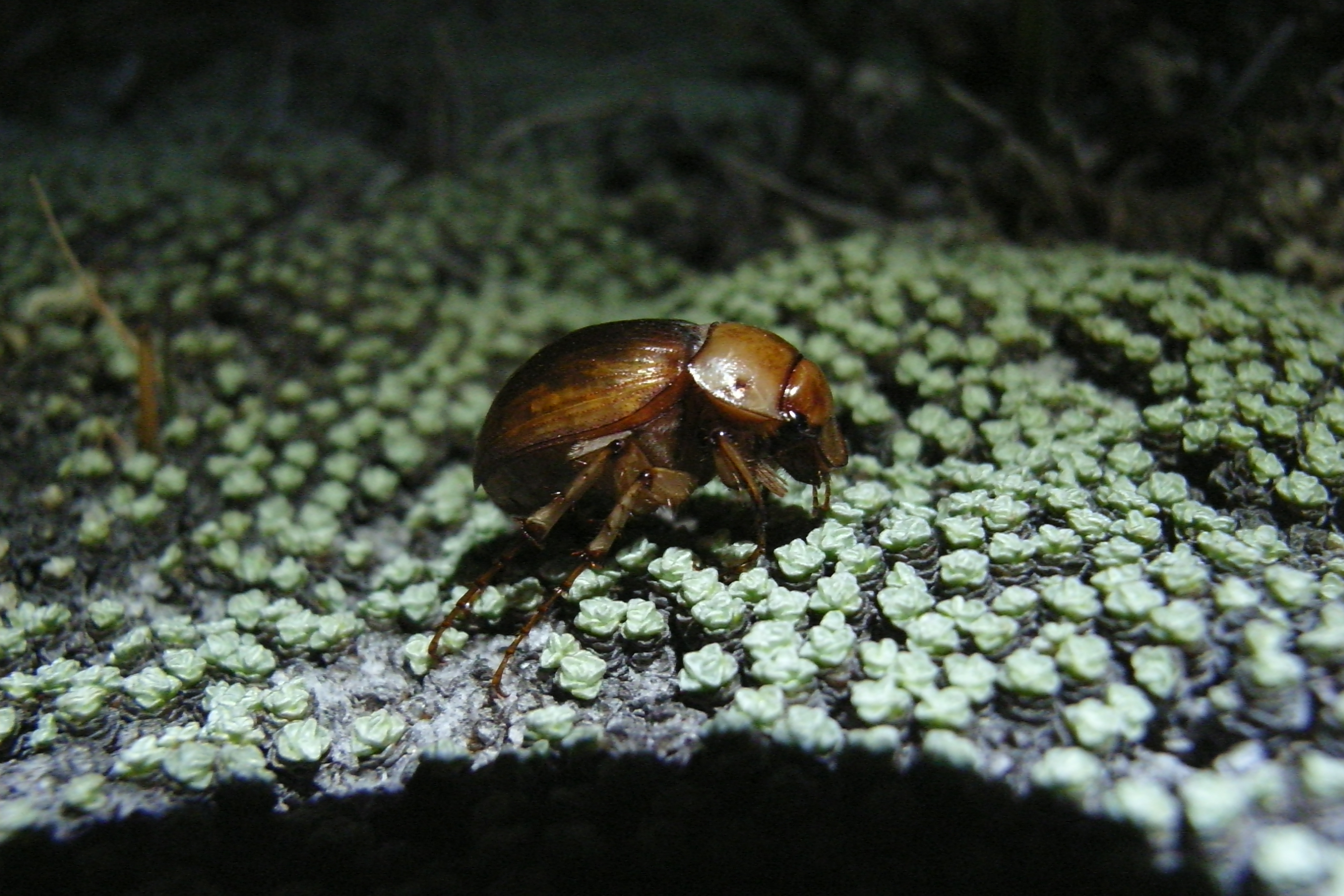
A male Cromwell chafer beetle on Raoulia australis

The river terrace the beetle occupies is also the location of the town of Cromwell. Some of the beetles were found north of the town in 1968, next to a nine-hole golf course, but that population was destroyed when the course was expanded to 18 holes. A block of undeveloped habitat surrounded by streets existed in the town of Cromwell itself by the 1970s; two residents used pitfall traps to catch and relocate the beetles from this block over 1975–76, before it was levelled for housing. Much of the rest of the beetle's original 500-hectare range was destroyed by the construction of the Clyde Dam in 1979 and the subsequent formation of Lake Dunstan. The remaining surviving population of the Cromwell chafer was a 95 hectare triangular area of undeveloped land immediately south-west of Cromwell. In 1979, an 81 ha area was fenced off to protect the population, and in 1983 it was gazetted as the Cromwell Chafer Beetle Nature Reserve: at the time, the only reserve in the world created solely for an invertebrate.

In 1996, after years of being classed as Vulnerable, the Cromwell chafer was declared Critically Endangered on the IUCN Red List. It currently has the Department of Conservation status Nationally Endangered. The main threats to the Cromwell chafer were formerly habitat destruction, but now are introduced predators.

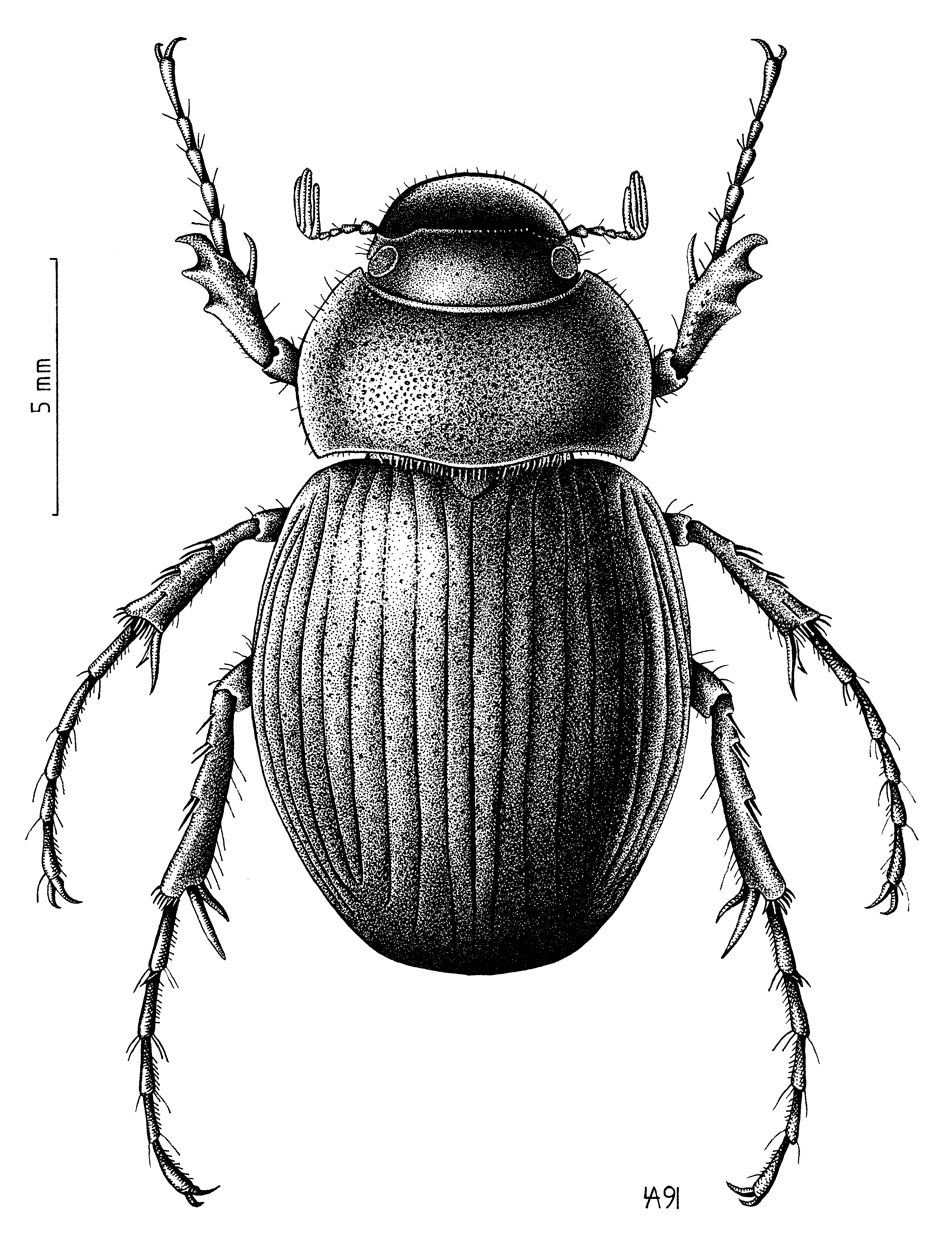
Illustrated by Lesley Alexander

The beetle is preyed on by introduced hedgehogs, little owls, and possibly European earwigs. Recently, the species of most concern has been the introduced Australian redback spider, which became established in Central Otago in the 1980s. Redback spiders shelter in rabbit holes in the reserve, and may kill hundreds of chafer beetles a year. The Department of Conservation are controlling rabbits and destroying rabbit burrows in the reserve.

There is an annual survey of Cromwell chafer numbers – on "Cromwell chafer beetle day" – by DOC and Agresearch, conducted by taking 670 core samples of sand in the reserve and checking them for beetle larvae. Numbers found are usually very low, just a few individuals per survey. The population of Cromwell chafers was estimated to be approximately 3000 individuals in 2012.

== See also ==
- Conservation in New Zealand
- Hedgehogs in New Zealand
