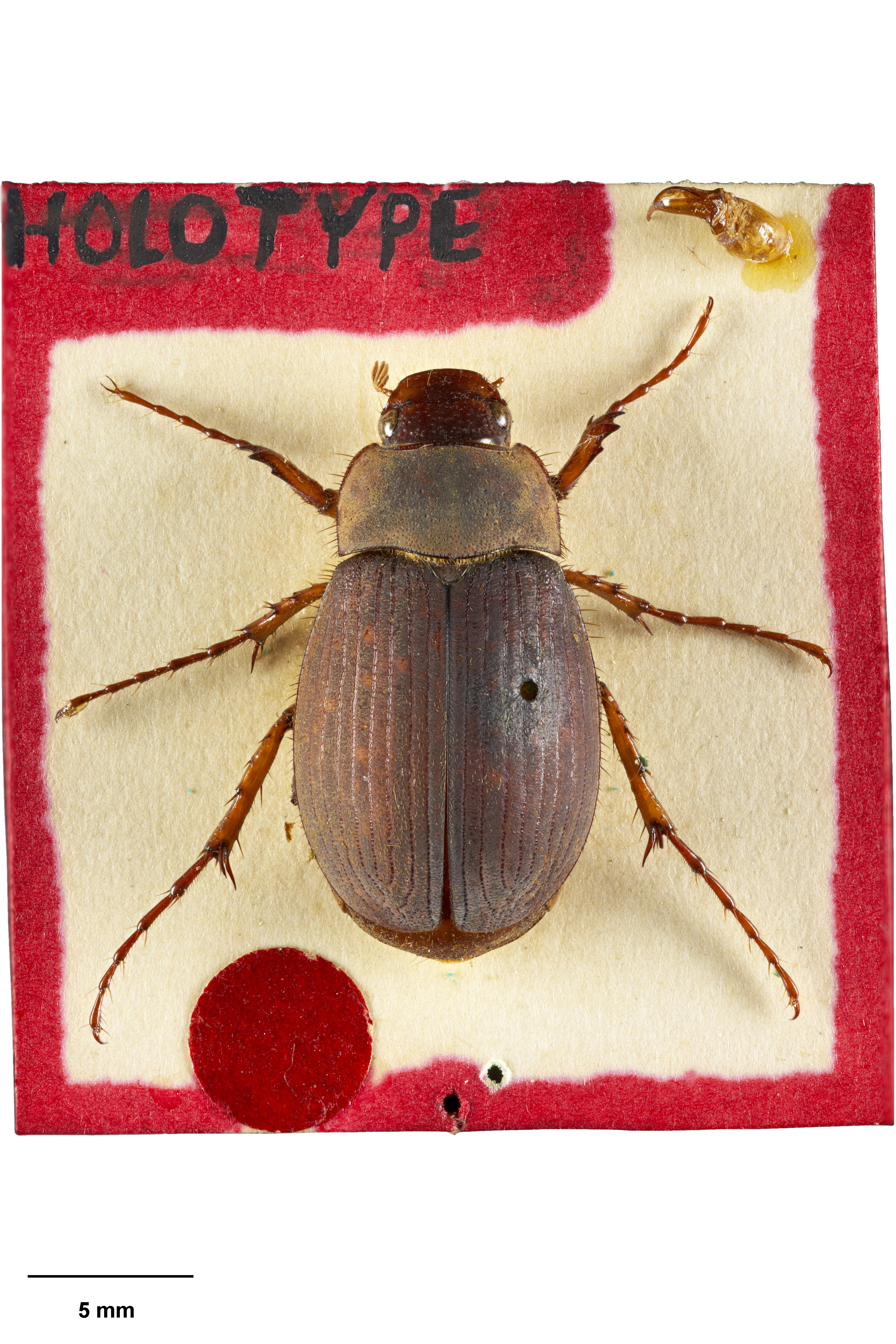
- Holotype specimen

Conservation status
- Naturally Uncommon (NZ TCS)

Scientific classification
- Domain: Eukaryota
- Kingdom: Animalia
- Phylum: Arthropoda
- Class: Insecta
- Order: Coleoptera
- Suborder: Polyphaga
- Infraorder: Scarabaeiformia
- Family: Scarabaeidae
- Genus: Prodontria
- Species: P. longitarsis

Binomial name
- Prodontria longitarsis (Broun, 1909)

Synonyms
- Odontria longitarsis Broun, 1909

= Prodontria longitarsis =

Species of beetle

Prodontria longitarsis is a species of flightless beetle in the family Scarabaeidae. This species was first described by Broun in 1909 as Odontria longitarsis. The holotype specimen was collected by George Hudson during the Sub-Antarctic Islands Scientific Expedition and is held at Te Papa.

== Description ==
This species was described by Broun as follows:

Subopaque, broadly oviform, moderately convex, sparingly clothed with fine short testaceous setae; the surface more or less variegated with dull fuscous and rufo-castaneous; palpi, antennae, and tarsi red, legs infuscate testaceous; ventral segments variegate, fuscous and fusco-testaceous, with somewhat elongated punctures and very scanty pubescence; the metasternum testaceous. Clypeus distinctly marginated, subtruncate in front, its punctuation rather shallow, moderately coarse, not very close, somewhat rugose; it is quite glossy, and reddish-brown. Head also shining, darker than the clypeus, with better-defined, larger, and more distinctly separated punctures. Thorax strongly transverse, bisinuate at base, widely incurved in front, the anterior angles not projecting beyond the back of the eyes, posterior angles rectangular but obtuse; its sides gently rounded, very finely margined, and bearing numerous rigid rufescent setae; disc opaque, fuscous, the sides broadly pale rufo-fuscous; punctuation distinct, yet rather fine. Elytra of exactly the same width as thorax at the base, widest behind the middle, apices individually broadly rounded; their striae well marked alongside the suture, less so beyond; the sculpture of these striae peculiar — not definite punctures, but shallow elongate impressions, each minutely margined; the interstices closely transversely rugose; the sides bear stiff reddish setae, but there are very few on the disc, those that are visible usually arise from the few scattered pale spots. Pygidium very closely and minutely sculptured. Legs shining, elongate. Anterior tibiae tridentate externally. All the tarsi very long and slender, quite a third longer than the tibiae. Antennae short, the exposed part of the basal joint not much longer than the 2nd; 3rd more slender, just longer than broad; 4th short and transverse, slightly produced inwardly. Club short, quadriarticulate, its 1st joint quite onethird shorter than the others.

== Distribution ==
This species is found on the Snares Islands.

== Conservation status ==
This insect has been classified as naturally uncommon under the New Zealand threat classification system.
