= The Cromwell Argus =

Defunct New Zealand newspaper

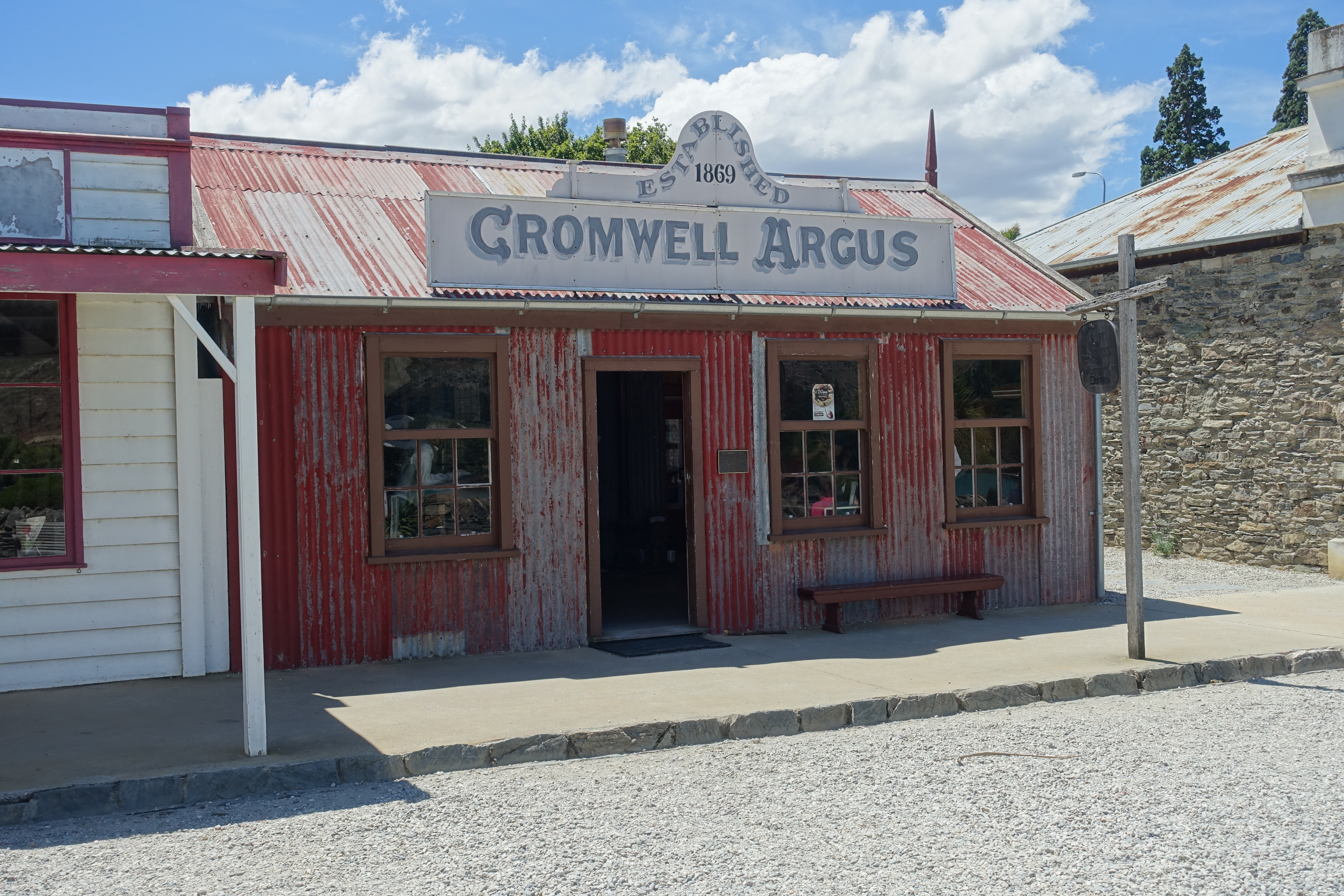
The building of The Cromwell Argus in the town's heritage precinct

The Cromwell Argus was a newspaper in Cromwell, New Zealand, from 1869 to 1948.

The Cromwell Argus was founded by James Matthews and George Fenwick, and was instrumental in the latter's career. Matthews and Fenwick were colleagues at the Otago Daily Times. Matthews bought the Tuapeka Press and Goldfields Advocate and offered Fenwick a partnership, and Fenwick's younger brother William a job. Tuapeka proved too small for two newspapers and when they were offered £150 from their competition, the Tuapeka Times, they sold the rights to their newspaper to them.

Looking for other opportunities, Matthews and Fenwick identified Cromwell that did not have a newspaper yet. When they investigated the town in detail in October 1868, they found that Robert Carrick intended to set one up. When Carrick agreed to drop his venture Matthews and Fenwick proceeded, only to find that Carrick had changed his mind and was also going ahead with his Cromwell Guardian. The last issue of the Tuapeka Press and Goldfields Advocate was printed on Wednesday, 3 November 1868 and after the normal print run, they changed the masthead to read The Cromwell Argus and printed the first issue in Lawrence. Fenwick rode by horse from Tuapeka to Cromwell and by the following Monday had distributed the 500 copies printed for the first issue. As they explained in their first edition, it did thus not contain any local Cromwell news. Their rival paper, the Cromwell Guardian, did not last for long.

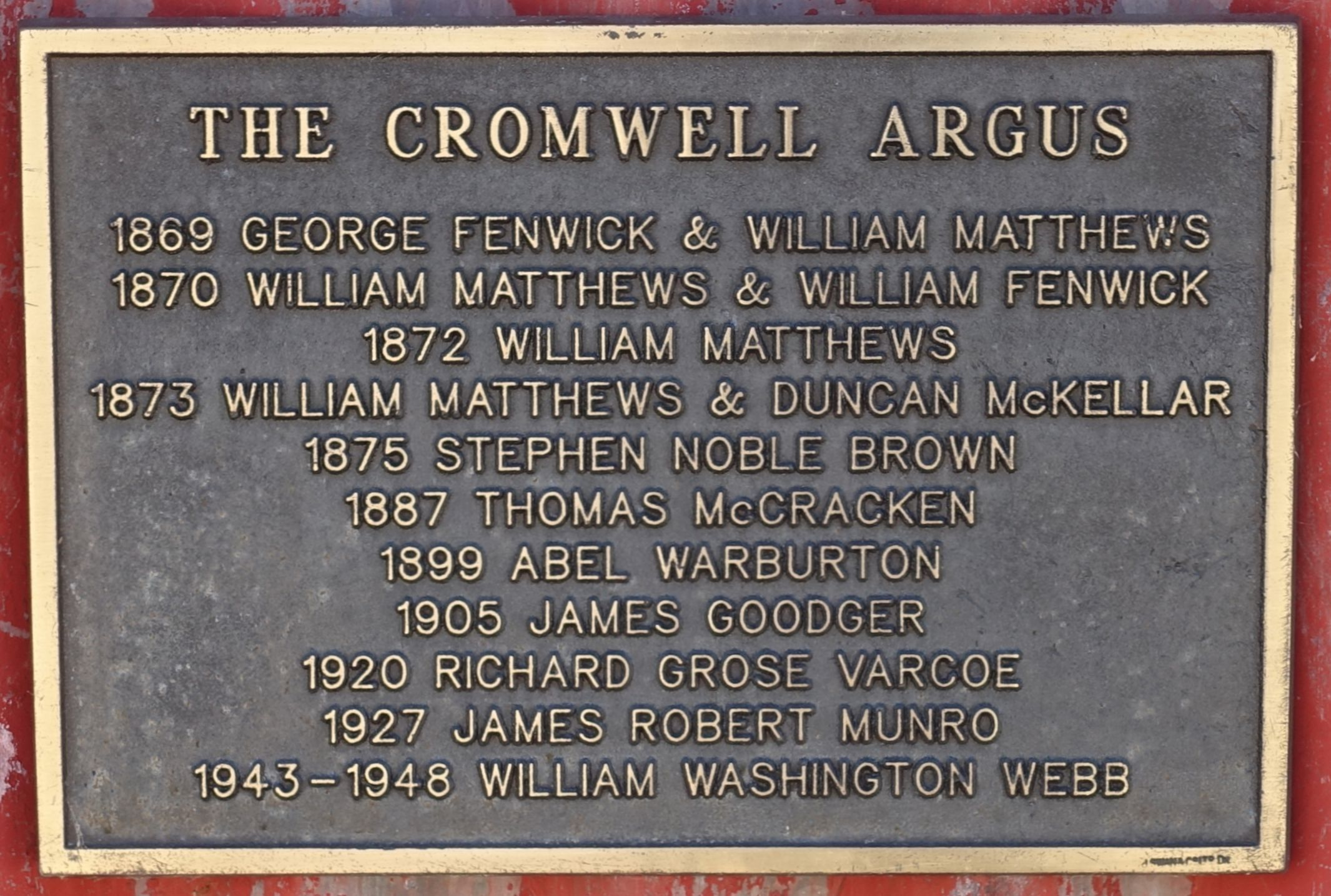
Proprietors of The Cromwell Argus

In 1871, George Fenwick transferred his part-ownership to this younger brother and moved to Dunedin. In 1875, William Fenwick and Matthews sold The Cromwell Argus to Stephen Noble Brown. Subsequent ownership changes took place in 1887 (Thomas McCracken), 1899 (Abel Warburton), 1905 (James Goodger), 1920 (Richard Grose Vercoe), 1927 (James Robert Munro), and 1943 (William Washington Webb). The last edition of The Cromwell Argus was issued on 26 October 1948.

The newspaper office was in Melmore Terrace, Cromwell's main street. When the Clyde Dam was filled in 1990 it flooded most of that main street. Many buildings from the 1860s were rebuilt on higher ground and now form the town's heritage precinct. The office building of The Cromwell Argus is one of those relocated buildings.
