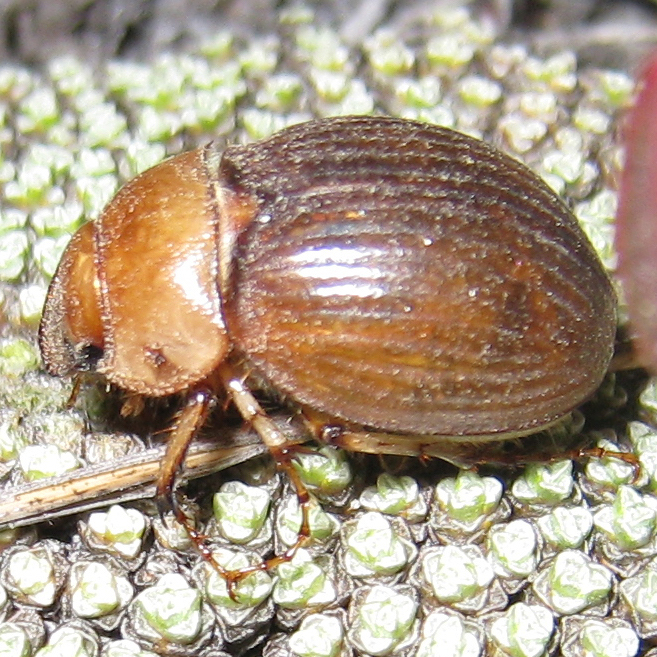
- Prodontria lewisi

Scientific classification
- Kingdom: Animalia
- Phylum: Arthropoda
- Clade: Pancrustacea
- Class: Insecta
- Order: Coleoptera
- Suborder: Polyphaga
- Infraorder: Scarabaeiformia
- Family: Scarabaeidae
- Genus: Prodontria

= Prodontria =

Genus of beetles

Prodontria is a genus of beetles in the family Scarabaeidae.

== Species ==
The following species are recognised in the genus Prodontria:

- Prodontria capito (Broun 1909)
- Prodontria grandis Given 1964
- Prodontria jenniferae Emerson 1997
- Prodontria lewisi Broun 1904
- Prodontria longitarsis (Broun 1909)
- Prodontria matagouriae Emerson 1997
- Prodontria minuta Emerson 1997
- Prodontria modesta (Broun 1909)
- Prodontria montis Emerson 1997
- Prodontria patricki Emerson 1997
- Prodontria pinguis Given 1952
- Prodontria praelatella (Broun 1909)
- Prodontria rakiurensis Emerson 1997
- Prodontria regalis Emerson 1997
- Prodontria setosa Given 1952
- Prodontria truncata Given 1960
