= Pisa Moorings =

- Rural settlement
- Interactive map of Pisa Moorings
- Coordinates: 44.978°S 169.239°E
- Country: New Zealand
- Region: Otago
- Territorial authority: Central Otago District
- Ward: Cromwell Ward
- Community: Cromwell Community
- Electorates: Waitaki; Te Tai Tonga (Māori)

Government
  - Territorial authority: Central Otago District Council
  - Regional council: Otago Regional Council
  - Mayor of Central Otago: Tamah Alley
  - Waitaki MP: Miles Anderson
  - Te Tai Tonga MP: Tākuta Ferris

Area
  - Total: 1.35 km^{2} (0.52 sq mi)

Population (June 2025)
  - Total: 980
  - Density: 730/km^{2} (1,900/sq mi)
- Time zone: UTC+12 (NZST)
  - Summer (DST): UTC+13 (NZDT)
- Local iwi: Ngāi Tahu

Pisa Moorings is a small town in the Central Otago District of Otago region of New Zealand's South Island. It is located between Lake Dunstan on its east and State Highway 6 on its west. Cromwell is 9 km southwest and Wānaka is 45 km north by road.

The residential housing at Pisa Moorings is being expanded as of 2019.

== Demographics ==
Pisa Moorings is described as a rural settlement by Statistics New Zealand. It covers 1.35 km^{2} (0.52 sq mi) and had an estimated population of 980 as of June 2025, with a population density of 726 people per km^{2}. It is part of the larger Lindis-Nevis Valleys statistical area.

Historical population
Year	Pop.	±% p.a.
2006	162	—
2013	345	+11.40%
2018	570	+10.56%

Pisa Moorings had a population of 570 at the 2018 New Zealand census, an increase of 225 people (65.2%) since the 2013 census, and an increase of 408 people (251.9%) since the 2006 census. There were 216 households, comprising 282 males and 288 females, giving a sex ratio of 0.98 males per female, with 120 people (21.1%) aged under 15 years, 75 (13.2%) aged 15 to 29, 294 (51.6%) aged 30 to 64, and 78 (13.7%) aged 65 or older.

Ethnicities were 95.8% European/Pākehā, 5.3% Māori, 2.6% Pasifika, 1.1% Asian, and 3.2% other ethnicities. People may identify with more than one ethnicity.

Although some people chose not to answer the census's question about religious affiliation, 62.1% had no religion, 28.9% were Christian, 0.5% were Hindu, 0.5% were Buddhist and 1.1% had other religions.

Of those at least 15 years old, 102 (22.7%) people had a bachelor's or higher degree, and 57 (12.7%) people had no formal qualifications. 108 people (24.0%) earned over $70,000 compared to 17.2% nationally. The employment status of those at least 15 was that 282 (62.7%) people were employed full-time, 63 (14.0%) were part-time, and 9 (2.0%) were unemployed.
