= Cromwell, New Zealand =

Town in Otago, New Zealand

Cromwell Tīrau (Māori)
- Town
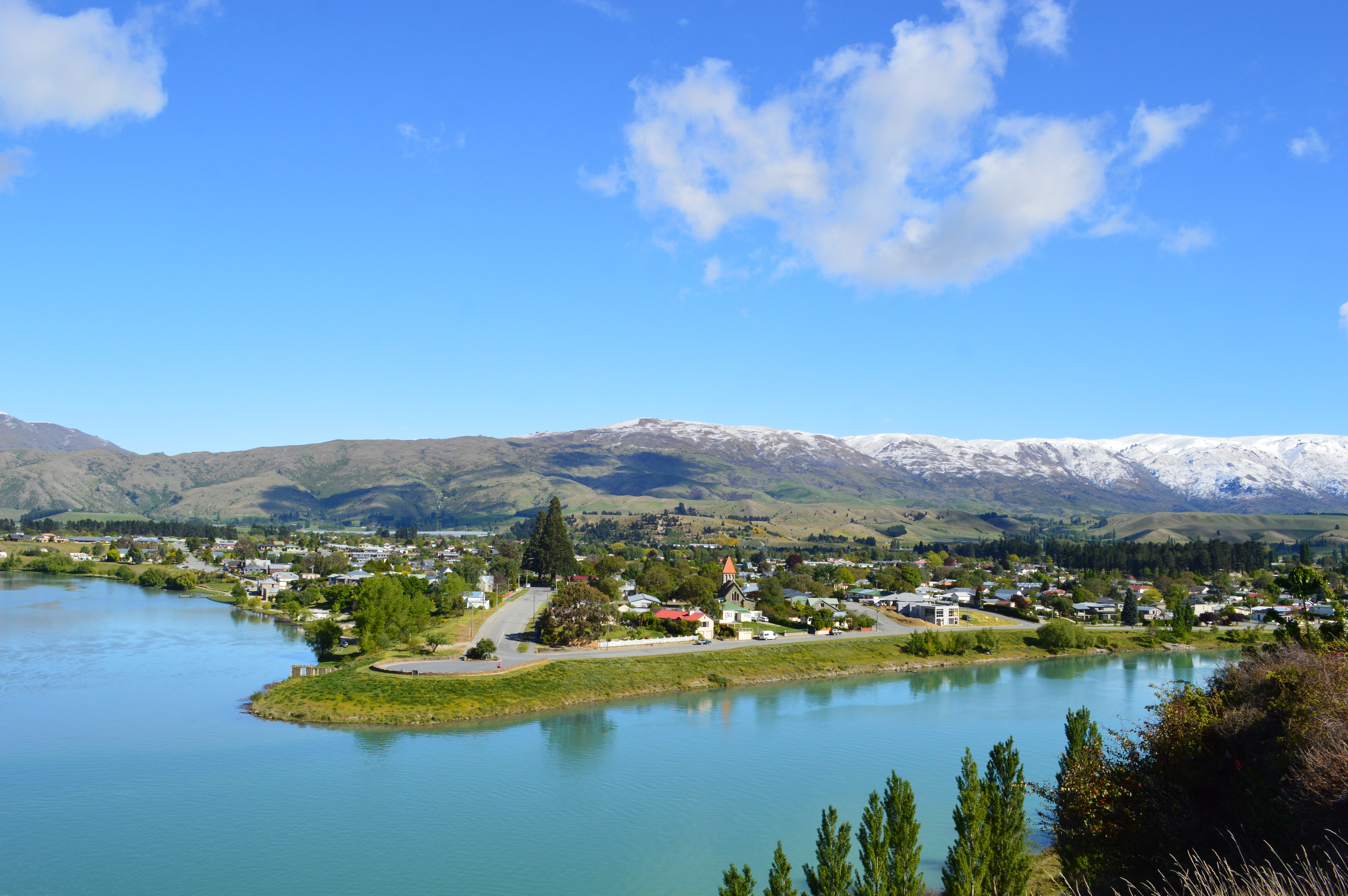
- Interactive map of Cromwell
- Coordinates: 45°02′45.4″S 169°11′44″E
- Country: New Zealand
- Region: Otago
- Territorial authority: Central Otago District
- Ward: Cromwell Ward
- Community: Cromwell Community
- Electorates: Waitaki; Te Tai Tonga (Māori)

Government
  - Territorial authority: Central Otago District Council
  - Regional council: Otago Regional Council
  - Mayor of Central Otago: Tamah Alley
  - Waitaki MP: Miles Anderson
  - Te Tai Tonga MP: Tākuta Ferris

Area
  - Total: 15.63 km^{2} (6.03 sq mi)
- Elevation: 210 m (690 ft)

Population (June 2025)
  - Total: 7,470
  - Density: 478/km^{2} (1,240/sq mi)
- Time zone: UTC+12 (NZST)
  - Summer (DST): UTC+13 (NZDT)
- Postcode(s): 9310
- Local iwi: Ngāi Tahu

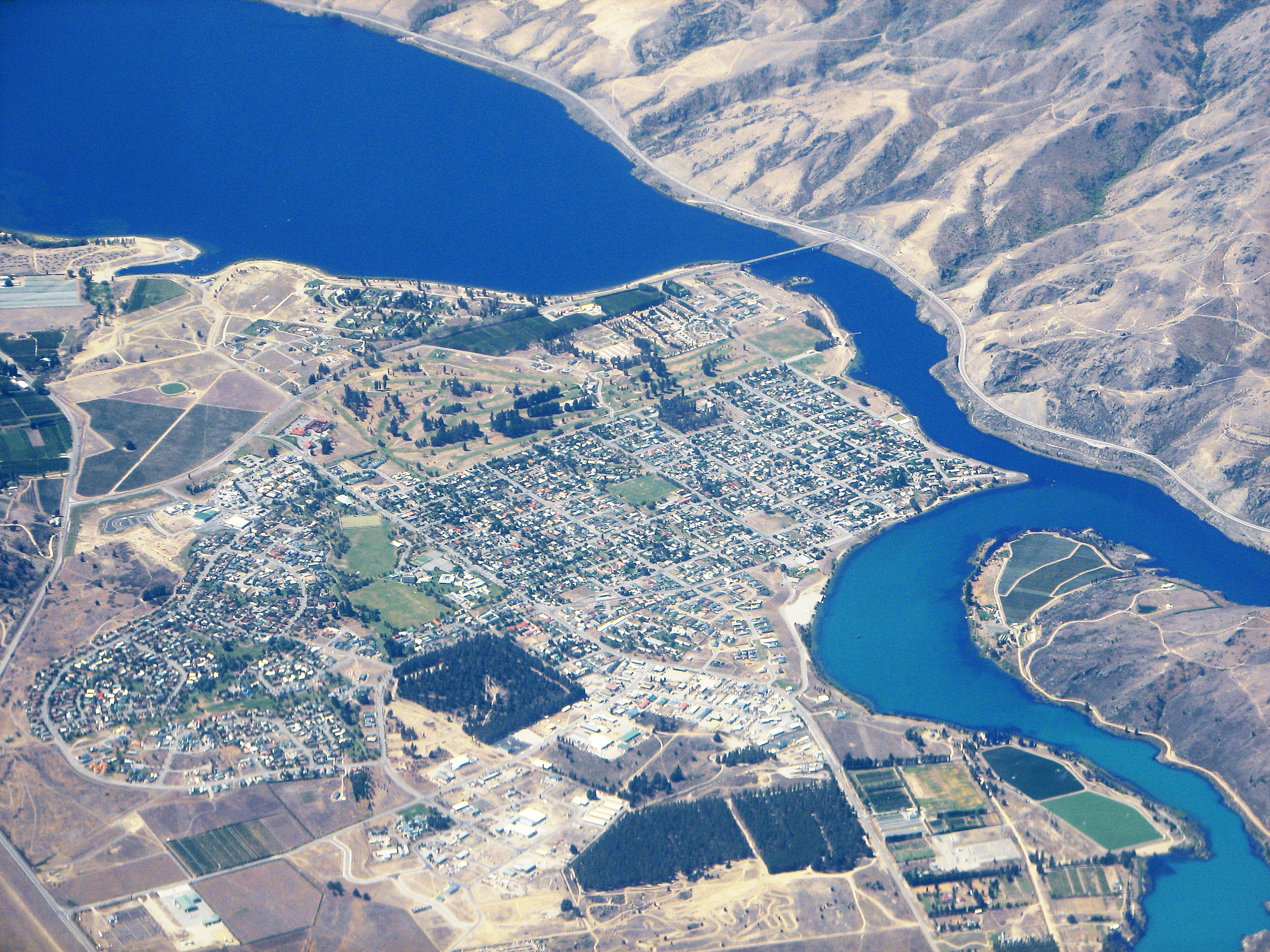
Aerial view of Cromwell from the south

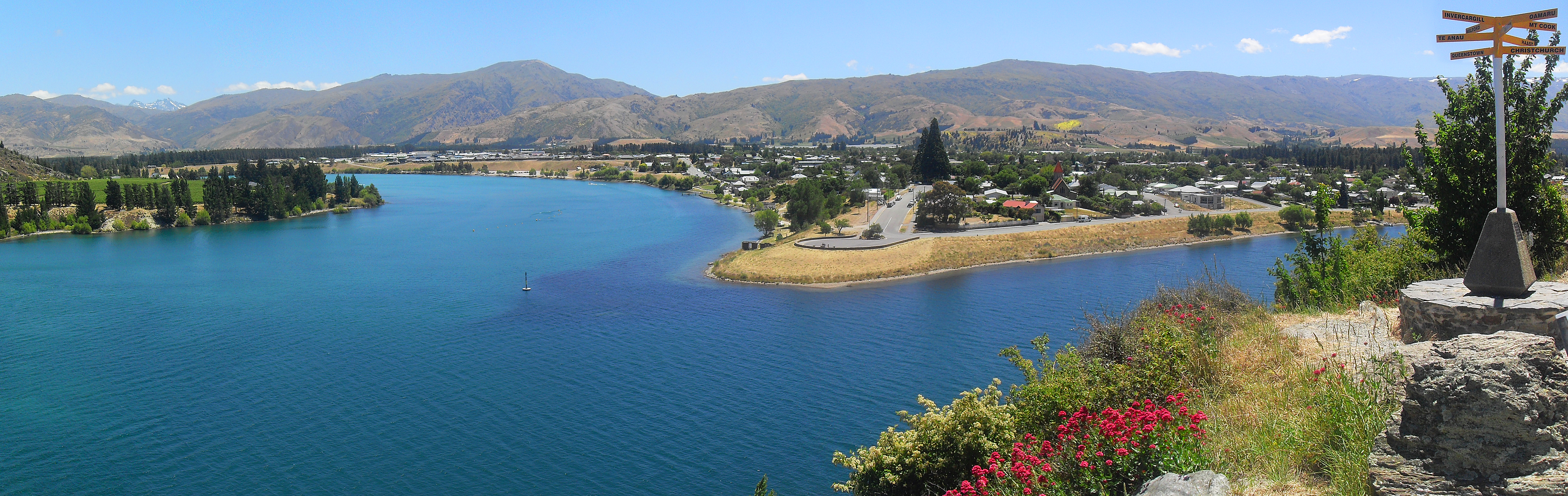
The town of Cromwell and Lake Dunstan

Cromwell (Māori: Tīrau) is a town in the Central Otago region of New Zealand's South Island, located on the shore of Lake Dunstan. Established at the confluence of the Clutha / Mata-Au and Kawarau Rivers after gold was discovered nearby during the Otago Gold Rush of the 1860s, Cromwell's location saw it become a junction for travel between Dunedin and areas further inland, such as Wānaka and Queenstown. As gold mining declined, the town developed to service farms and orchards in the surrounding area, becoming known for stone fruit and as part of the Central Otago wine region. The town remains a hub for people travelling throughout the region, with State Highway 8B running through the town and acting as a main route for travellers to Queenstown.

The construction of the Clyde Dam and subsequent creation of Lake Dunstan during the 1980s and 1990s saw Cromwell expand as a town, while also requiring the relocation of a third of town's buildings from areas that would be flooded, including the town centre. Remnants of the old town centre above the lake's water line have been retained and now form a historic precinct near the lake shore. Recent years have seen further development in Cromwell and the surrounding areas, including the construction of the Highlands Motorsport Park to the west in 2013 and the Lake Dunstan Trail to the south in 2021.

== Etymology ==
Māori refer to the area as "Tirau", referring to their plantings of Ti cabbage trees to stand as navigation markers and also as food for travellers.

European (Pākehā) goldiggers called it as "The Junction", "The Point", or "Kawarau Junction", as it is at the confluence of the Clutha River / Mata-Au and the Kawarau River.

The town was named Cromwell in the middle of 1863 by J. A. Connell of the Dunedin firm Connell and Moodie, who was from Northern Ireland. Because of "a silly rivalry between a Northern Irish surveyor and Irish miners" in the district he decided "to put the curse of Cromwell on them".

== Geography ==
Cromwell is between State Highway 6 (linking to Wānaka, 50 kilometres (31 mi) north, and Queenstown via the Kawarau Gorge, 60 kilometres (37 mi) west) and State Highway 8 leading to the Lindis Pass, 75 kilometres (47 mi) northeast, and Alexandra, 33 km south. The road to Alexandra winds through the Cromwell Gorge. A point near Cromwell lies 119 kilometres from the sea, the farthest from the sea anywhere in New Zealand. A prominent feature surrounding much of the town is the man-made Lake Dunstan.

Cromwell is surrounded by the Pisa mountain range to the north (including Mount Pisa, 1963 metres) the Dunstan Mountains to the northeast (including Mount Dunstan, 1667 metres) Mount Difficulty (1285 metres) to the west and the Old Woman Range and Cairnmuir mountains to the south.

Nearby settlements are at Bannockburn, Lowburn, Tarras, and Ripponvale.

Cromwell has a strategic location between the Lindis and the Haast passes, and acts as a hub between the towns of Wānaka, Queenstown and Alexandra.

Cromwell is also the home of the Cromwell Chafer Beetle (Prodontria lewisi).

The 45th parallel south runs just north of the township.

Cromwell lay at the confluence of the Clutha River and the Kawarau River, which was noted for the difference between the colours of the waters of the two rivers and also for the historic bridge at the convergence of the two. Since the construction of the Clyde Dam and the filling of Lake Dunstan in the early 1990s the river confluence was drowned, as was the old town centre.

=== Climate ===
Cromwell receives around 400 mm of rain a year due to its inland location. Although it is widely believed to have a continental climate, the town officially has an oceanic climate (Cfb) with rainfall just enough to escape the semi-arid climate (BSk) classification.

Climate data for Cromwell (1991–2020 normals, extremes 1949–present)
Month	Jan	Feb	Mar	Apr	May	Jun	Jul	Aug	Sep	Oct	Nov	Dec	Year
Record high °C (°F)	36.6 (97.9)	36.4 (97.5)	32.7 (90.9)	27.8 (82.0)	24.0 (75.2)	21.0 (69.8)	18.8 (65.8)	22.3 (72.1)	26.0 (78.8)	30.0 (86.0)	33.3 (91.9)	33.8 (92.8)	36.6 (97.9)
Mean daily maximum °C (°F)	24.9 (76.8)	24.7 (76.5)	21.9 (71.4)	17.8 (64.0)	13.2 (55.8)	9.0 (48.2)	9.1 (48.4)	12.2 (54.0)	15.5 (59.9)	18.1 (64.6)	20.6 (69.1)	23.2 (73.8)	17.5 (63.5)
Daily mean °C (°F)	17.9 (64.2)	17.6 (63.7)	14.9 (58.8)	11.0 (51.8)	7.7 (45.9)	4.3 (39.7)	3.9 (39.0)	6.2 (43.2)	9.3 (48.7)	11.7 (53.1)	13.9 (57.0)	16.4 (61.5)	11.2 (52.2)
Mean daily minimum °C (°F)	10.9 (51.6)	10.5 (50.9)	7.8 (46.0)	4.3 (39.7)	2.2 (36.0)	−0.3 (31.5)	−1.3 (29.7)	0.2 (32.4)	3.0 (37.4)	5.2 (41.4)	7.2 (45.0)	9.5 (49.1)	4.9 (40.9)
Record low °C (°F)	0.0 (32.0)	−0.4 (31.3)	−3.4 (25.9)	−6.0 (21.2)	−9.1 (15.6)	−10.0 (14.0)	−9.0 (15.8)	−8.8 (16.2)	−7.2 (19.0)	−9.6 (14.7)	−4.2 (24.4)	−0.2 (31.6)	−10.0 (14.0)
Average rainfall mm (inches)	47.2 (1.86)	38.9 (1.53)	31.5 (1.24)	34.0 (1.34)	38.2 (1.50)	33.9 (1.33)	25.1 (0.99)	25.7 (1.01)	25.7 (1.01)	27.0 (1.06)	34.2 (1.35)	37.0 (1.46)	398.4 (15.68)
Mean monthly sunshine hours	256.1	235.4	222.0	172.3	119.9	94.8	108.2	156.8	188.8	223.8	238.4	251.8	2,268.3
Source: NIWA

== History ==
The first Pākehā to visit was Nathanael Chalmers in 1853, guided there by Reko and Kaikōura. He was stricken by dysentery, so his guides returned him down the Clutha, shooting the rapids in a mōkihi reed boat.

Official explorations of the northern and western parts of Central Otago began in the late 1850s, but detailed surveys did not commence until 1861.

In 1862, gold was discovered below the Junction by two miners, Horatio Hartley and Christopher Reilly. Once the word of a gold strike was out, there was an influx of several thousand miners to the area as well as supporting nine hotels in Cromwell.

Cromwell was declared a municipality in 1866. The government funded the construction of a bridge across the Clutha in 1866 (which cost 28,000 pounds). This was rebuilt in 1891. Bishop Selwyn visited in 1866. Cromwell's newspaper, The Cromwell Argus, was established in 1869. The Cromwell council chambers were completed in 1869 and the Cromwell district hospital was established in 1875 with wards to provide beds for ten inpatients.

The population was 424 people in 1878 and increased to 429 people in 1881. Gold mining by individuals was replaced by dredging by companies in the 1890s. but was short lived. The population decreased with smaller scale mining activities continuing until the 1930s. The Cromwell railway station, connecting Cromwell to Dunedin was opened in July 1921. It burnt down in 1942 and was subsequently rebuilt. it was closed in 1976 with the railway line from Clyde to Cromwell being closed in 1980.

Soldiers from Cromwell served in World War I with 13 losing their lives. A cenotaph was unveiled on 25 April 1923 to recognise their sacrifice. A further 11 soldiers from Cromwell died during World War II. A memorial hall was built in the 1950s which is dedicated to those fallen in the two World Wars.

As gold ran out, Cromwell became the service centre for an extensive farming and stone fruit growing area. An irrigation scheme was built in the 1920s diverting water from the Kawarau river to irrigate a large area of land near Ripponvale.

The stone fruit industry is commemorated with the giant sculpture of stone fruit which stands outside the northern end of the town. It was built by the Cromwell Rotary Club in 1990 with the design coming from Otto Muller. The sculpture is regularly repainted.

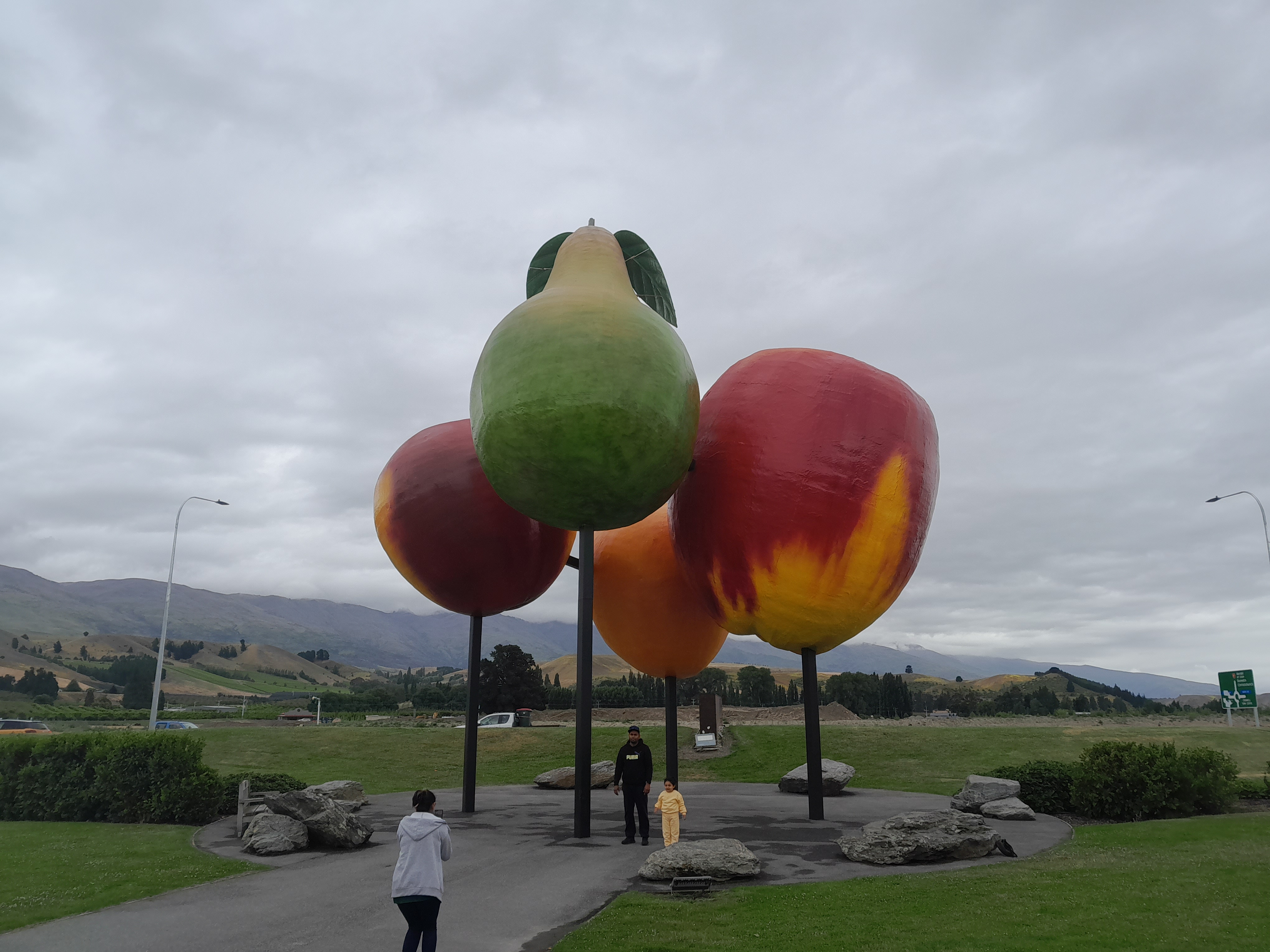
Cromwell fruit sculpture (2022)

The decision to build Clyde Dam and use Cromwell as the accommodation base brought many changes to the town. In the early stages, a government information centre in Cromwell was set on fire in a late-night attack.

Approximately one-third of the town was rebuilt on higher ground. A total of 60 homes and 50 commercial properties were affected. The changes included the doubling of the residential area, relocation of the old town centre (now called "Old Cromwell Town"), upgrading of services, the provision of modern educational and sports facilities, and the construction of the new Deadman's Point Bridge. The town centre was relocated between 1984 and 1985 to a new site known as "The Mall," that now houses the main retail, service and civic buildings in Cromwell. Several of the old buildings of the town which escaped the flooding have been retained as a historic precinct close to the shore of the Kawarau.

The lake started to fill in autumn of 1992 with 2000 hectares including farmland and 17 orchards also being flooded by Lake Dunstan.

Cromwell's array of fruit orchards has led to it being nicknamed the "fruit bowl of the south".

== Demography ==
The population of Cromwell was 838 people in 1951; 885 people in 1956 and 942 people in 1961.

Cromwell is described by Statistics New Zealand as a small urban area, and covers 15.63 km^{2} (6.03 sq mi). It had an estimated population of 7,470 as of June 2025, with a population density of 478 people per km^{2}.

Historical population for Cromwell
Year	Pop.	±% p.a.
2006	3,747	—
2013	4,341	+2.12%
2018	5,610	+5.26%

Cromwell had a population of 5,610 at the 2018 New Zealand census, an increase of 1,269 people (29.2%) since the 2013 census, and an increase of 1,863 people (49.7%) since the 2006 census. There were 2,109 households, comprising 2,898 males and 2,709 females, giving a sex ratio of 1.07 males per female, with 1,041 people (18.6%) aged under 15 years, 912 (16.3%) aged 15 to 29, 2,604 (46.4%) aged 30 to 64, and 1,053 (18.8%) aged 65 or older.

Ethnicities were 90.1% European/Pākehā, 9.1% Māori, 2.0% Pasifika, 3.9% Asian, and 2.5% other ethnicities. People may identify with more than one ethnicity.

The percentage of people born overseas was 16.8, compared with 27.1% nationally.

Although some people chose not to answer the census's question about religious affiliation, 56.3% had no religion, 35.7% were Christian, 0.2% had Māori religious beliefs, 0.2% were Hindu, 0.2% were Muslim, 0.5% were Buddhist and 1.8% had other religions.

Of those at least 15 years old, 666 (14.6%) people had a bachelor's or higher degree, and 852 (18.6%) people had no formal qualifications. 747 people (16.3%) earned over $70,000 compared to 17.2% nationally. The employment status of those at least 15 was that 2,730 (59.8%) people were employed full-time, 663 (14.5%) were part-time, and 75 (1.6%) were unemployed.

Individual statistical areas
Name	Area (km^{2})	Population	Density (per km^{2})	Households	Median age	Median income
Cromwell West	12.03	3,048	253	1,116	39.0 years	$36,700
Cromwell East	3.59	2,562	714	993	41.7 years	$38,500
New Zealand					37.4 years	$31,800

=== Lindis-Nevis Valleys ===
The statistical area of Lindis-Nevis Valleys, which includes Bannockburn and Pisa Moorings, surrounds but does not include Cromwell. It covers 2,884.61 km^{2} (1,113.75 sq mi) and had an estimated population of 3,430 as of June 2025, with a population density of 1.2 people per km^{2}.

Historical population for Lindis-Nevis Valleys
Year	Pop.	±% p.a.
2006	1,149	—
2013	1,677	+5.55%
2018	2,391	+7.35%

Lindis-Nevis Valleys had a population of 2,391 at the 2018 New Zealand census, an increase of 714 people (42.6%) since the 2013 census, and an increase of 1,242 people (108.1%) since the 2006 census. There were 963 households, comprising 1,215 males and 1,173 females, giving a sex ratio of 1.04 males per female. The median age was 46.5 years (compared with 37.4 years nationally), with 387 people (16.2%) aged under 15 years, 330 (13.8%) aged 15 to 29, 1,224 (51.2%) aged 30 to 64, and 447 (18.7%) aged 65 or older.

Ethnicities were 95.1% European/Pākehā, 5.6% Māori, 1.4% Pasifika, 1.3% Asian, and 2.0% other ethnicities. People may identify with more than one ethnicity.

The percentage of people born overseas was 16.6, compared with 27.1% nationally.

Although some people chose not to answer the census's question about religious affiliation, 59.8% had no religion, 30.7% were Christian, 0.1% had Māori religious beliefs, 0.4% were Hindu, 0.4% were Buddhist and 1.5% had other religions.

Of those at least 15 years old, 468 (23.4%) people had a bachelor's or higher degree, and 288 (14.4%) people had no formal qualifications. The median income was $40,400, compared with $31,800 nationally. 429 people (21.4%) earned over $70,000 compared to 17.2% nationally. The employment status of those at least 15 was that 1,188 (59.3%) people were employed full-time, 321 (16.0%) were part-time, and 33 (1.6%) were unemployed.

== Amenities ==
=== Motorsport park and museum ===
The Highlands Motorsport Park is located on the western edge of Cromwell. The park includes a $25 million classic car museum as well as a 4,100-metre-long (13,500 ft) race track.

=== Cromwell museum ===
The Cromwell museum was established in the 1960s. It had to relocate in 1988 due to its original location being due to be flooded by the filling of Lake Dunstan. It is currently located at 47 The Mall. Its collections include Chinese artefacts (which tell of the history of the Chinese gold miners in the region), moa bones, domestic and agricultural items and photographs of Cromwell.

=== Cromwell swimming pool ===
The Cromwell swimming pool was built in the 1980s. It was upgraded in 2007. Located on Barry Avenue, the indoor complex contains a 25-metre pool, a learners' pool and a toddler's pool.

=== Kiwi water park ===
The Kiwi water park is located five minutes outside of Cromwell on state highway 6. The park containing various inflatable obstacles, water toys and diving boards. It attracted 30,000 visitors in the summer of 2021/22. There was doubt that it would open for the 2022 / 23 summer season due to traffic safety issues entering the park but a resolution was achieved.

=== Cromwell public library ===
The Cromwell public library is located at 43 The Mall. It is open six days each week and is administered by Central Otago and Queenstown Lakes Library consortia. The library has wifi, computer facilities and wheelchair access as well as a range of fiction and non – fiction books, magazines and DVDs.

== Sport and recreation ==
=== Rugby ===
The Cromwell rugby club was established in 1888 and had its 125th Jubilee in 2013. It has had many successes with the 2007 team winning every trophy that season. Cromwell lost the Central Otago rugby final to Wakatipu in 2022.

=== Mountain biking ===
The Lake Dunstan mountain bike trail was opened in May 2021. It connects Cromwell to Clyde and the Otago Central Rail Trail. The Lake Dunstan mountain bike trail is 55 kilometres long and includes cantilevered platforms to get around a series of granite cliffs. In the first ten months after opening, 62560 people had ridden the trail. Some of the trail has steeper climbs and is more remote and a safety video was made to prepare riders in what to expect on the trail.

Other trails in the Cromwell area include the 16 kilometre Cromwell Heritage Precinct to Smith's Way along the Lake Dunstan foreshore. In August 2022, the Cromwell mountain bike club were planning to build a mountain bike trail park at Shannon Farm. It was thought that it would include 14 kilometres of grade 3 (intermediate) to 5 (expert) trails.

=== Cromwell golf club ===
The Cromwell golf club held its first meeting in 1903. The course was redesigned in 2010 by Greg Turner and Scott MacPherson. The Cromwell Golf Club has held the New Zealand Open final qualifying event on more than one occasion. It has also held the South Island Amateur Championships, the 1988 NZ Seniors Championship and the 2001 Freyberg Masters. In 2019, The golf course was ranked the 22nd best course out of the top 50 courses by New Zealand Golf Digest. The golf course is an 18 hole is a sand-based, links-style course.

=== Cromwell bowling club ===
The Cromwell bowling club was established in August 1911. An artificial green was installed in 2015 which widened the playing season to ten months of the year. The club is located at 50 Alpha Street.

=== Cromwell racecourse ===
Horse racing has occurred on the racecourse land since 1862, with the Cromwell Jockey Club operating the racecourse between 1867 and 1999. In 1876, the Cromwell Racecourse Reserve Act was enacted for the purposes of establishing a board of trustees and putting aside the land for the public racecourse. The racecourse land has also been used as the Cromwell racecourse aerodrome, for outdoor concerts and pony club events. It has a 1600-metre track with a 350-metre straight. A new grandstand was built in 2007.

The longest running race to be held at the Cromwell racecourse is the Cromwell gallops race meeting which, in 2022, had been held annually for 156 years.

== Historic places ==
=== Cromwell heritage precinct ===
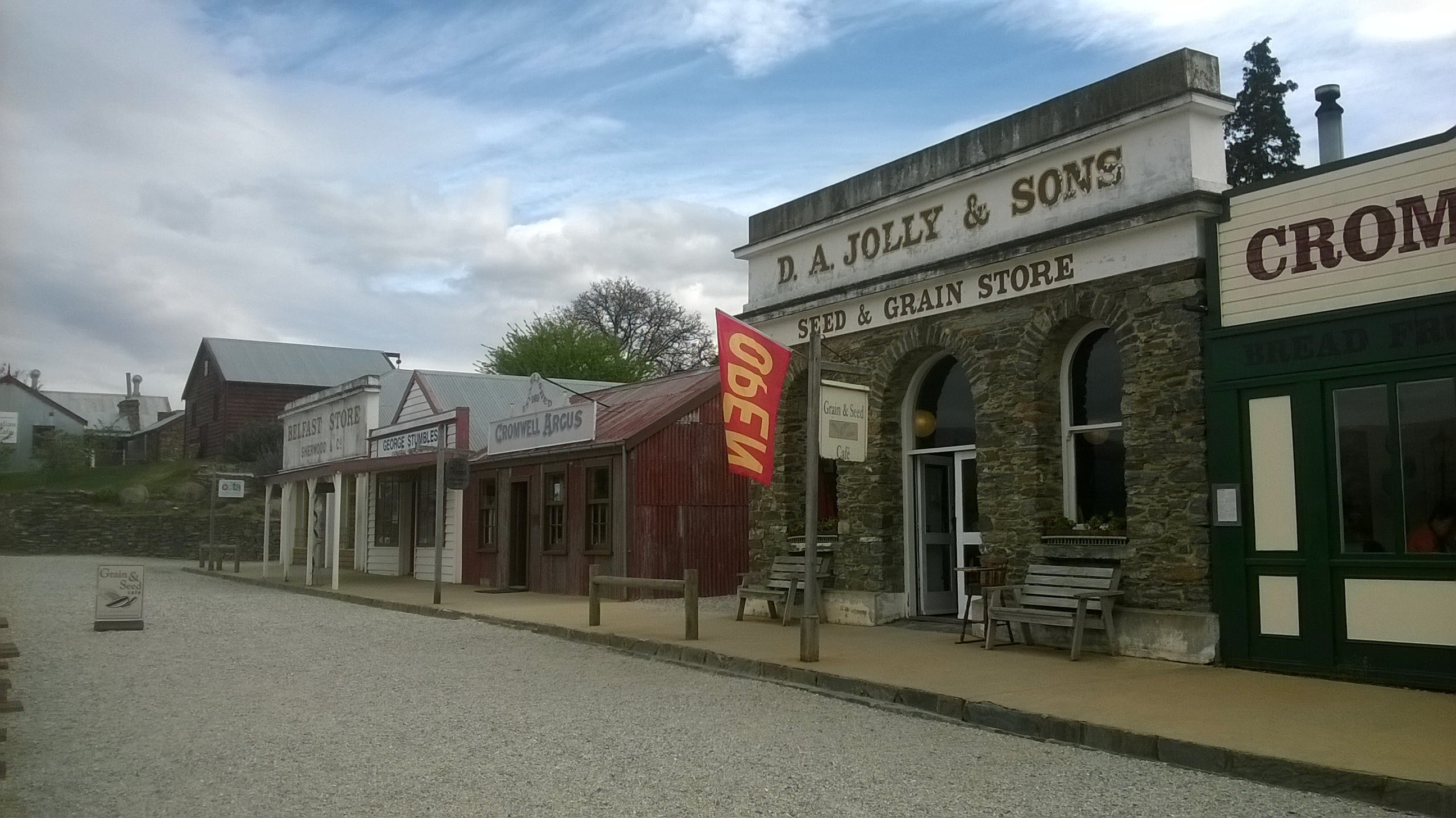
Old Cromwell Town's historic street (Melmore Terrace), 2014

The construction of the Clyde Dam created Lake Dunstan, which consumed part of the old Cromwell town. Some of the historic buildings were saved or rebuilt to create the heritage precinct. Near the precinct is the Cromwell Kilwinning Lodge No.98 which was built in 1869.

=== Former St John's Presbyterian church ===
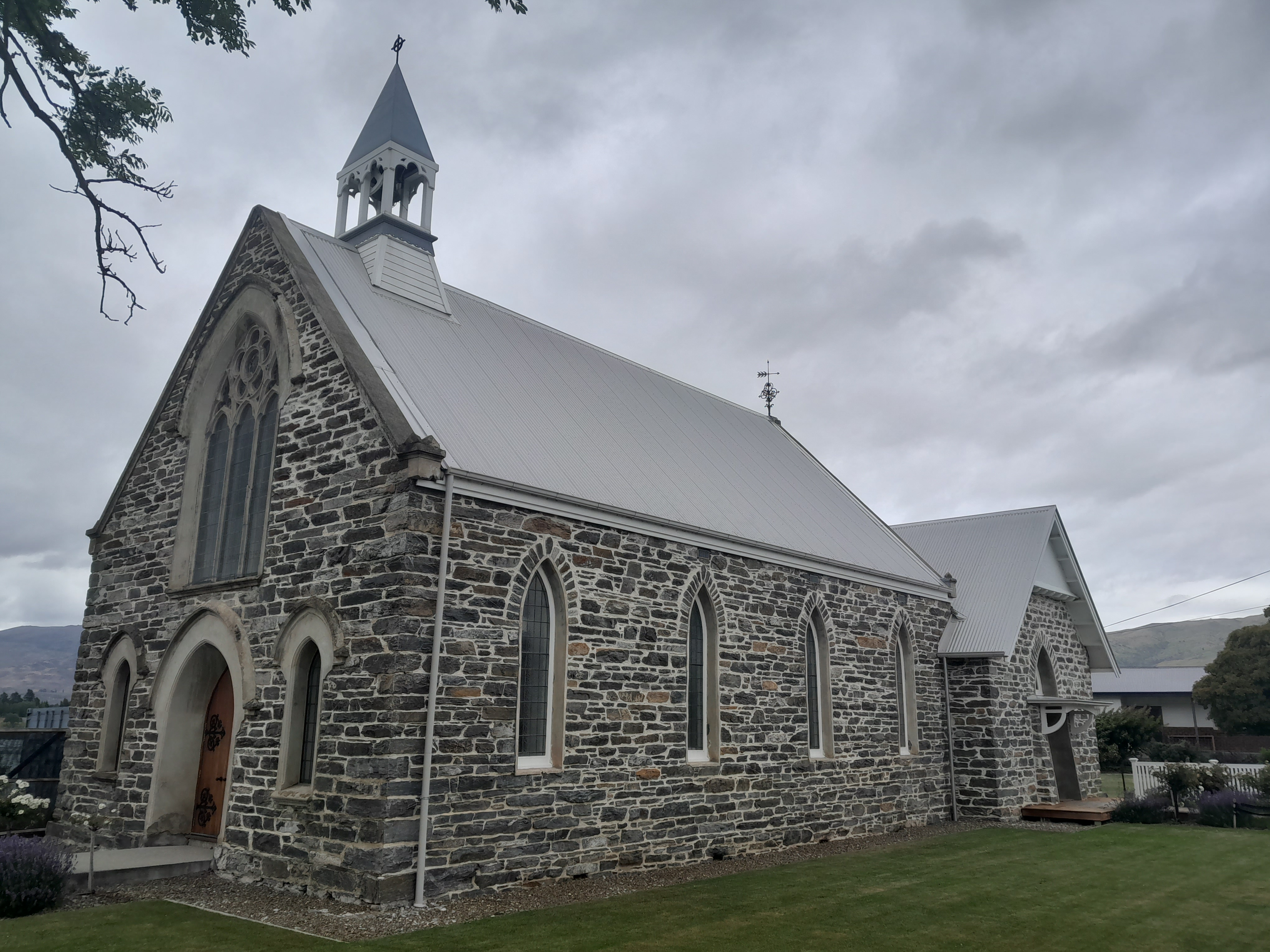
The former St John's Presbyterian church (2022)

Presbyterian church services where first held in Cromwell by the 1860s. In the 1870s, fundraising took place to build a church. The St John's Presbyterian church was designed by F.W. Burwell in a gothic style and built by Grant and Mackellar out of local schist stone. The church hall was added in 1913. The church closed in 2004 and was sold. The building is a category two historic place.

=== Mary Immaculate and the Irish Martyrs Catholic church ===
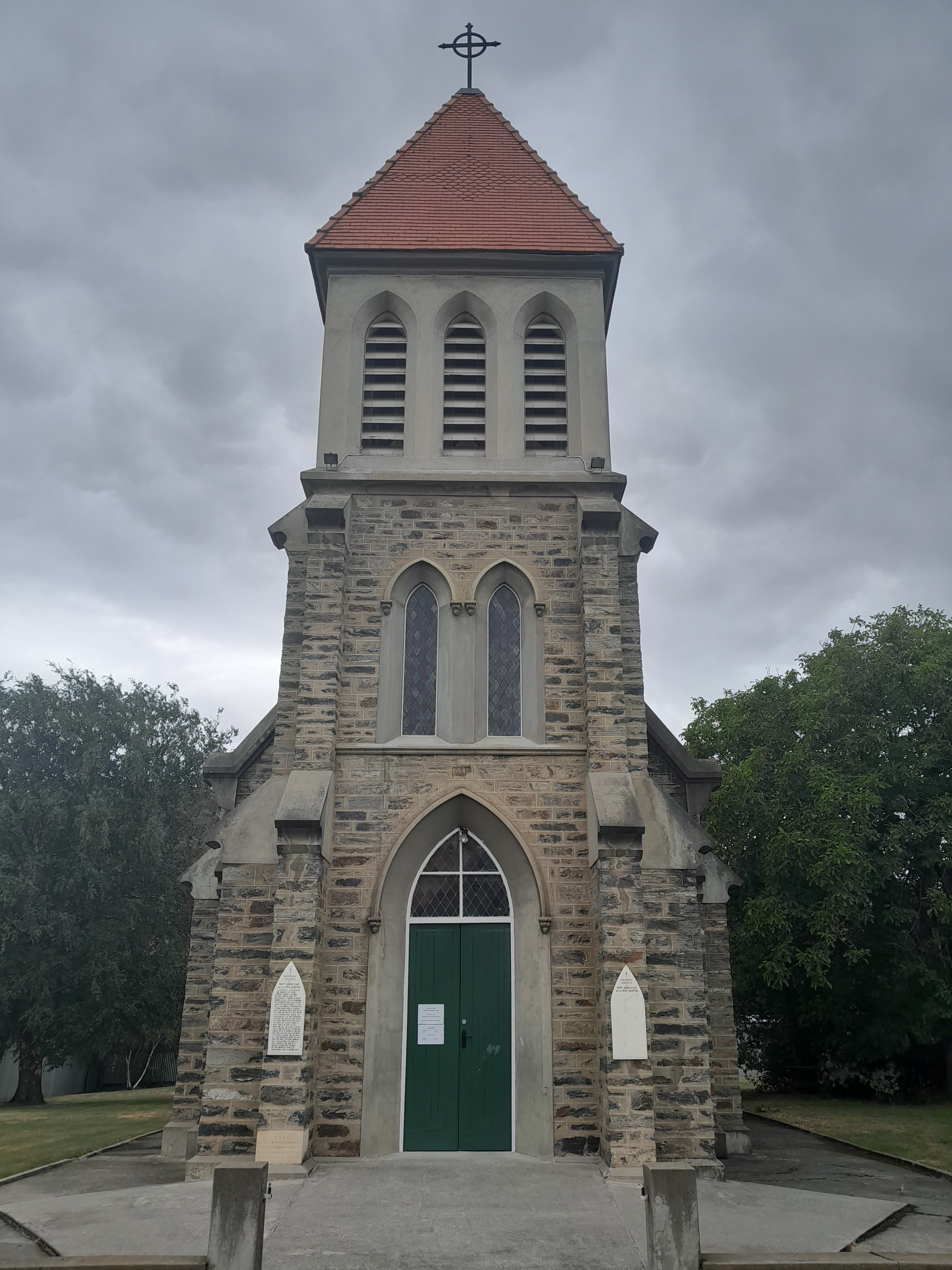
Mary Immaculate and the Irish Martyrs Catholic church, Cromwell (2022)

The Mary Immaculate and the Irish Martyrs Catholic church was opened in April 1909. The church has a 20-metre-tall (66 ft) belltower with an orange-tiled roof. At the time of its opening, it was described as "far and away the handsomest building in Cromwell". The parish was renamed in recognition of both the Irish Catholic Martyrs and the role of Irish Catholic gold-miners in founding the town.

=== St Andrew's Anglican church ===
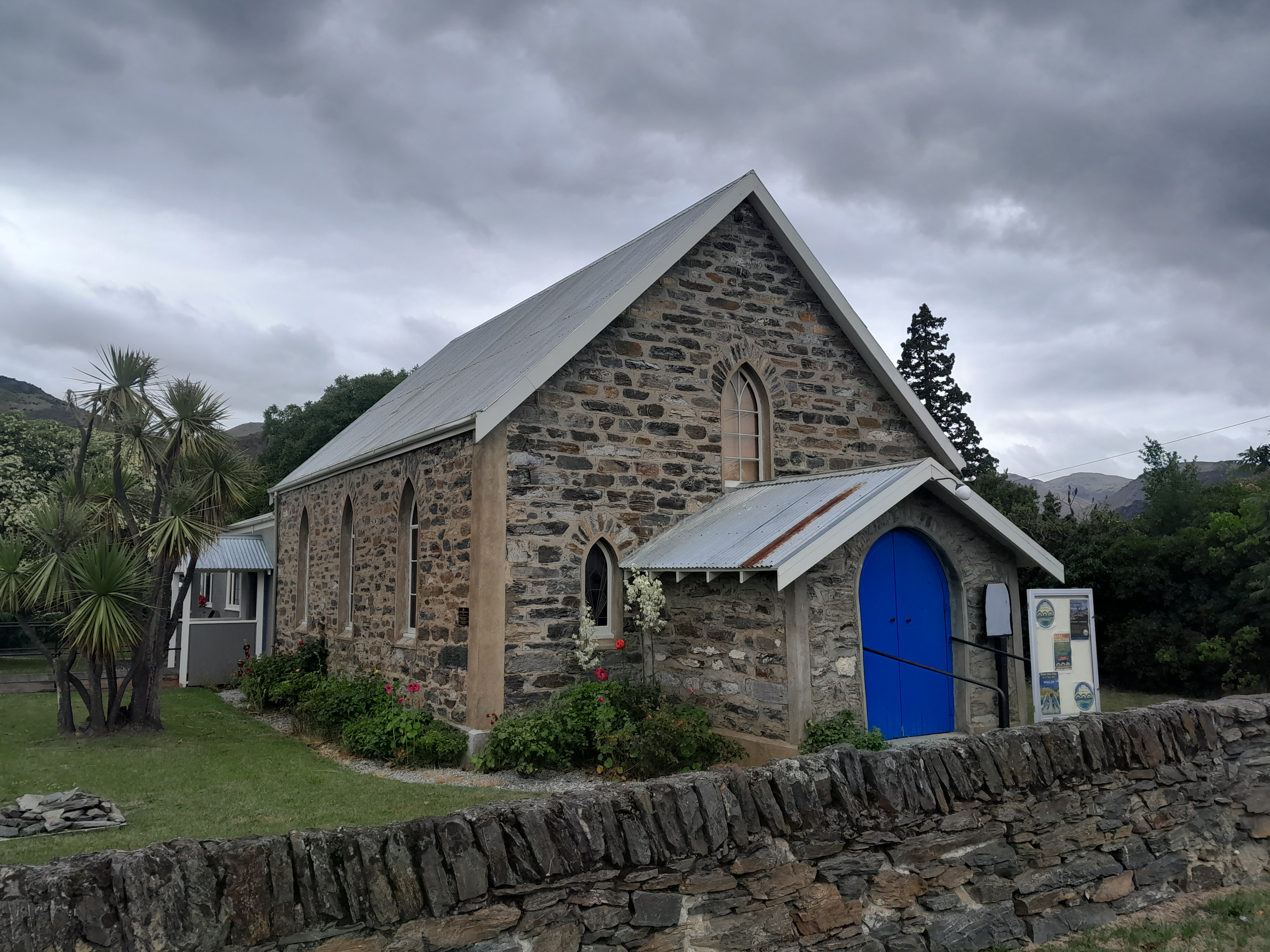
St Andrew's Anglican church, Cromwell (2022)

St Andrew's Anglican church was opened in 1874. It was designed in a Gothic style. The site for the church was chosen when Bishop Samuel Tarratt Nevill visited in 1873. John Marsh, a local Cromwell resident donated the land for the church and the church cost 700 pounds to build. The Ladies Guild raised 150 pounds of the cost in 1874. Leadlight windows were installed in the east and west ends in 1893. A pipe organ was installed in 1919. Electricity was installed in the church in 1926 and the church hall was built in 1932.

=== Athenaeum hall ===
The Athenaeum Hall was built in 1874. It was used to house the Cromwell Museum until 1988 and then earthworks from the building of Lake Dunstan left it three quarters buried. Work (including stonemasonry) was being completed in 2017 to stabilise the remaining walls.

=== Litany Street cemetery ===
The Litany Street cemetery was Cromwell's first cemetery and was established in 1865. This cemetery is the resting place for a number of the early Cromwell gold miners. A number of the early Chinese immigrants who came to Cromwell in search of gold are also buried here. In the early 1900s a second cemetery was created and is known as the new Cromwell cemetery.

=== Former Cromwell courthouse ===
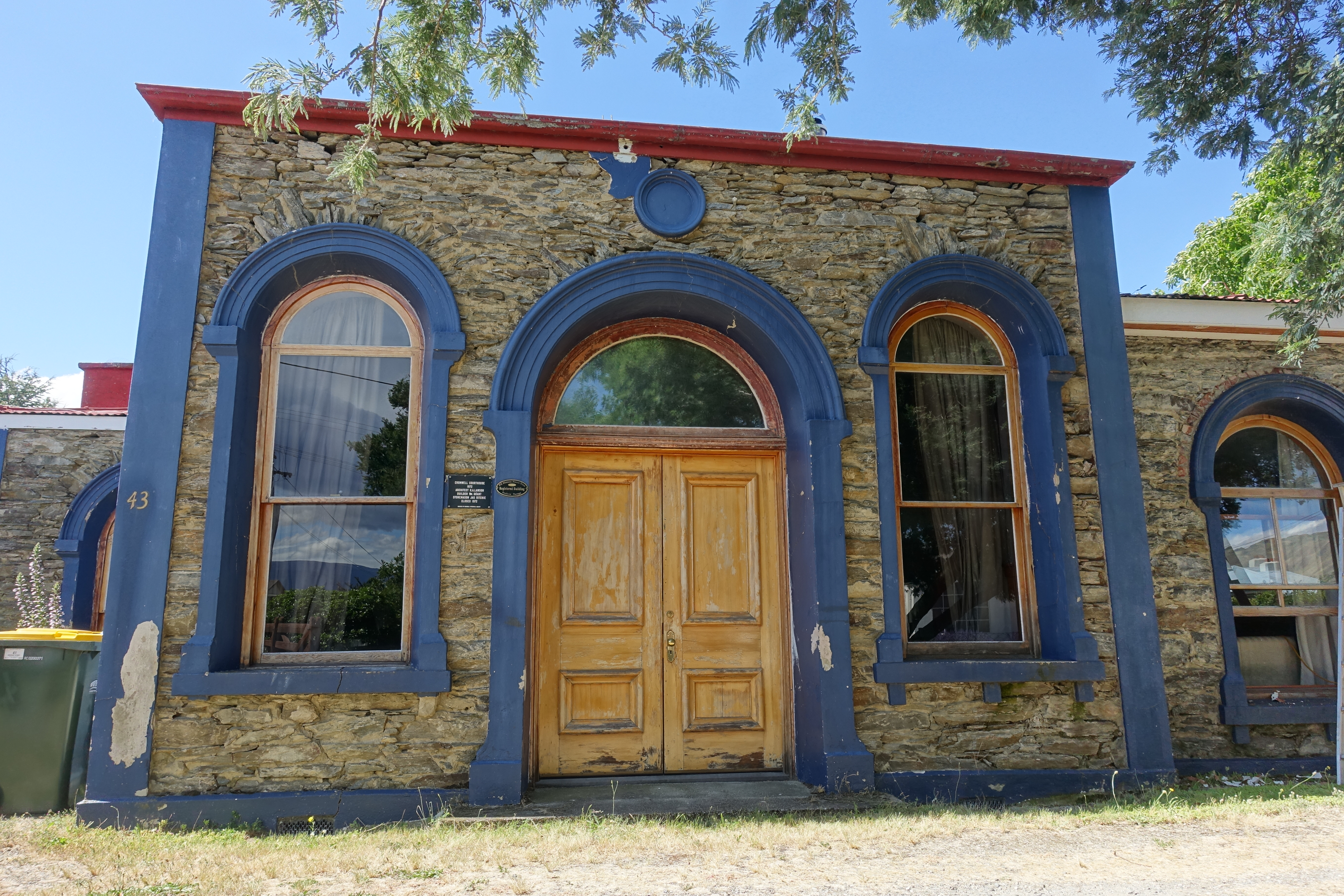
The former Cromwell courthouse (built 1872).

The Cromwell courthouse was built by William Grant (a carpenter) and James Ritchie (a stonemason) and was completed in 1872. It was used at the courthouse in Cromwell for over one hundred years. It is now privately owned. It is a category two Historic Place.

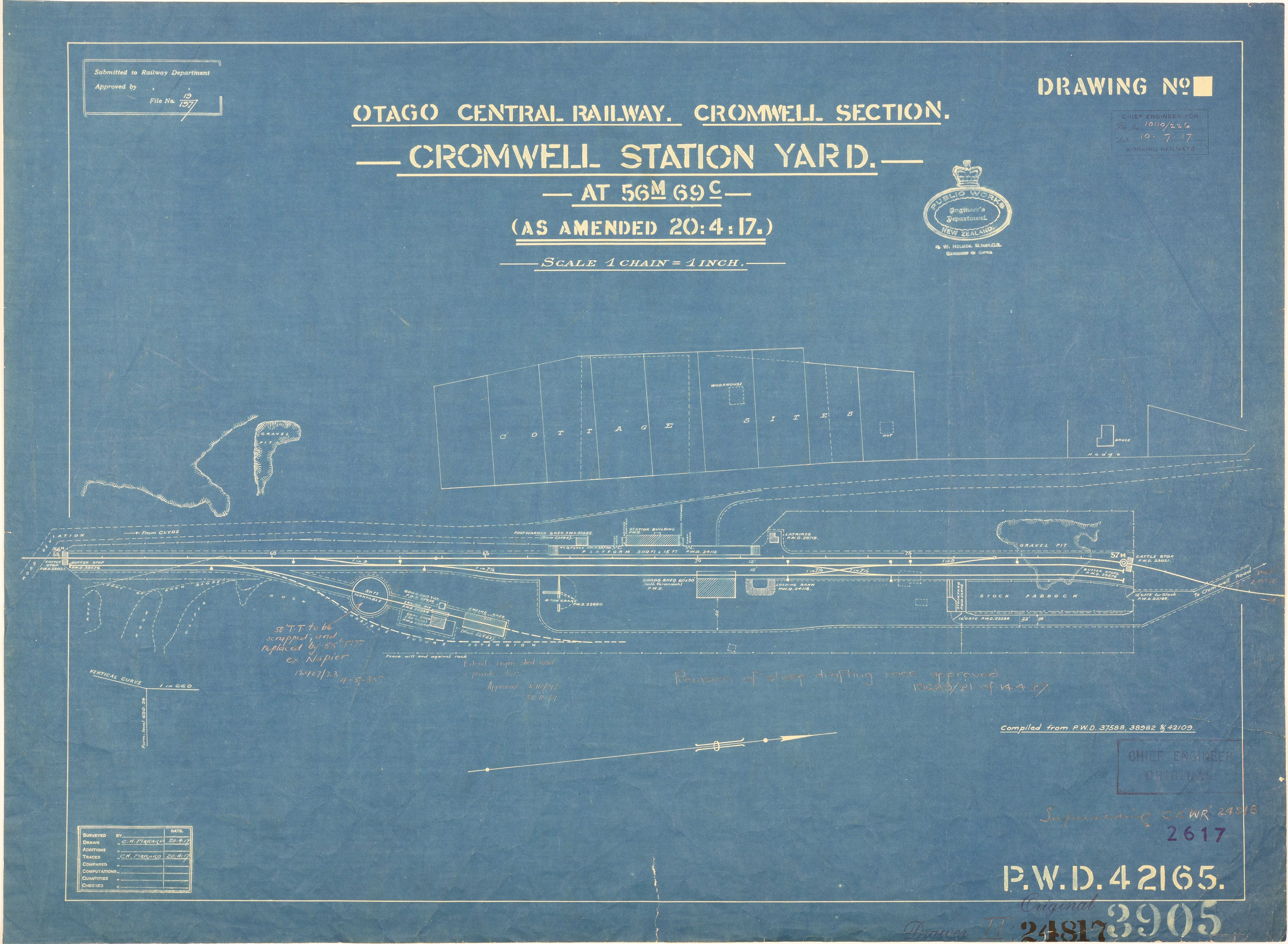
Cromwell Station Yard Plan

=== Bannockburn ===
Bannockburn is located 5.8 km south of Cromwell via Bannockburn road. It is possible to walk to Bannockburn via the 11 kilometre Cromwell to Bannockburn lakeside walk. Bannockburn is a small town which was once the centre of a gold mining industry. Historic buildings include the hotel, post office, Stewart's store, and a number of homes. Next to the town of Bannockburn are the Bannockburn sluicings. These include dams, tunnels, water races and shafts created during the gold mining era between 1865 and 1910.

=== Bendigo goldfields ===
The Bendigo Goldfields were a successful quartz mining area for over half a century. From the site of the old Bendigo township at the top of the Bendigo Loop Road a steep, narrow vehicle track winds up into the hills to Logantown and even further up to Welshtown, where remains of old stone cottages can be found.

=== Carrick goldfields ===
The ruins of Carricktown are 4 km up a 4WD track from the old mining area of Quartzville (near the end of Quartzville Road), and the Young Australian 6 m overshot water-wheel can be found a further 3 km on. The track continues up to Duffer's Saddle. Return down Nevis Road to Bannockburn.

== Education ==
The first school in Cromwell opened in 1865, but its roll outstripped its capacity and it was replaced in 1874. Another school opened in 1915 with a secondary section in 1924. Cromwell District High School opened in 1929, and became Cromwell College in 1978 when it changed to accept year 7 and 8 students.

Cromwell Primary School is a co-educational state primary school for Year 1 to 6 students, with a roll of 407 as of July 2026.

Goldfields School is a co-educational state primary school for Year 1 to 6 students, with a roll of 324.

Cromwell College is a co-educational state secondary school for Year 7 to 13 students, with a roll of 696.

Otago Polytechnic has a campus in Cromwell specialising in horticulture, catering and tourism. Its crop centre provides advisory services to horticulturalists on commercially viable new crops.

== Government ==
Cromwell has local government services provided to it by the Central Otago District Council and the Otago Regional Council. Cromwell is part of the Waitaki electorate.

== Cromwell mayors ==
Former mayors of the Borough of Cromwell were as follows

- W. J. Barry 1866–1868
- W. Whetter 1868–1869
- G. W. Goodger 1869–1870
- W. Smitham 1870–1871
- J. D. Taylor 1871–1872
- M. Fraer 1872–1873
- J. Dawkins 1873–1874
- D. A. Jolly 1874–1877
- S. N. Brown 1877–1878
- C. Colclough 1878–1881
- M. Behrens 1881–1883
- J. Marsh 1883–1885
- S. H. Turton 1885–1889
- T. McCracken 1889–1891
- D. A. Jolly 1891–1892
- J. L. Scott 1892–1895
- T. Rooney 1895–1897
- K. Pretsch 1897–1899
- E. Murrell 1899–1905
- J. Little 1905–1909
- E. Murrell 1905–1913
- E. Jolly 1913–1915
- A. M. Brodrick 1915–1921
- D. C. Jolly 1921–1927
- C. C. Sanders 1927–1929
- C. W. J. Roberts 1929–1937
- J. C. Parcell 1937–1943
- R. E. Austin 1943–1944
- W. Partridge 1944–1950
- James Robert Munro 1950–1951
- F. G. Dunn 1951–1956
- L. R. Skinner 1956–1958
- L. A. Jelley 1958–1960
- I. G. Anderson 1960–1980
- P. J. Mead 1980–1986
- D. A. Butcher 1986–1989

== Sources ==
- Reed, A.W. (2002) The Reed dictionary of New Zealand place names. Auckland: Reed Books. ISBN 0-790-00761-4.
- An Encyclopaedia of New Zealand, 1966, A. H. McLintock (editor)
