= Bannockburn, New Zealand =

Bannockburn
- Town
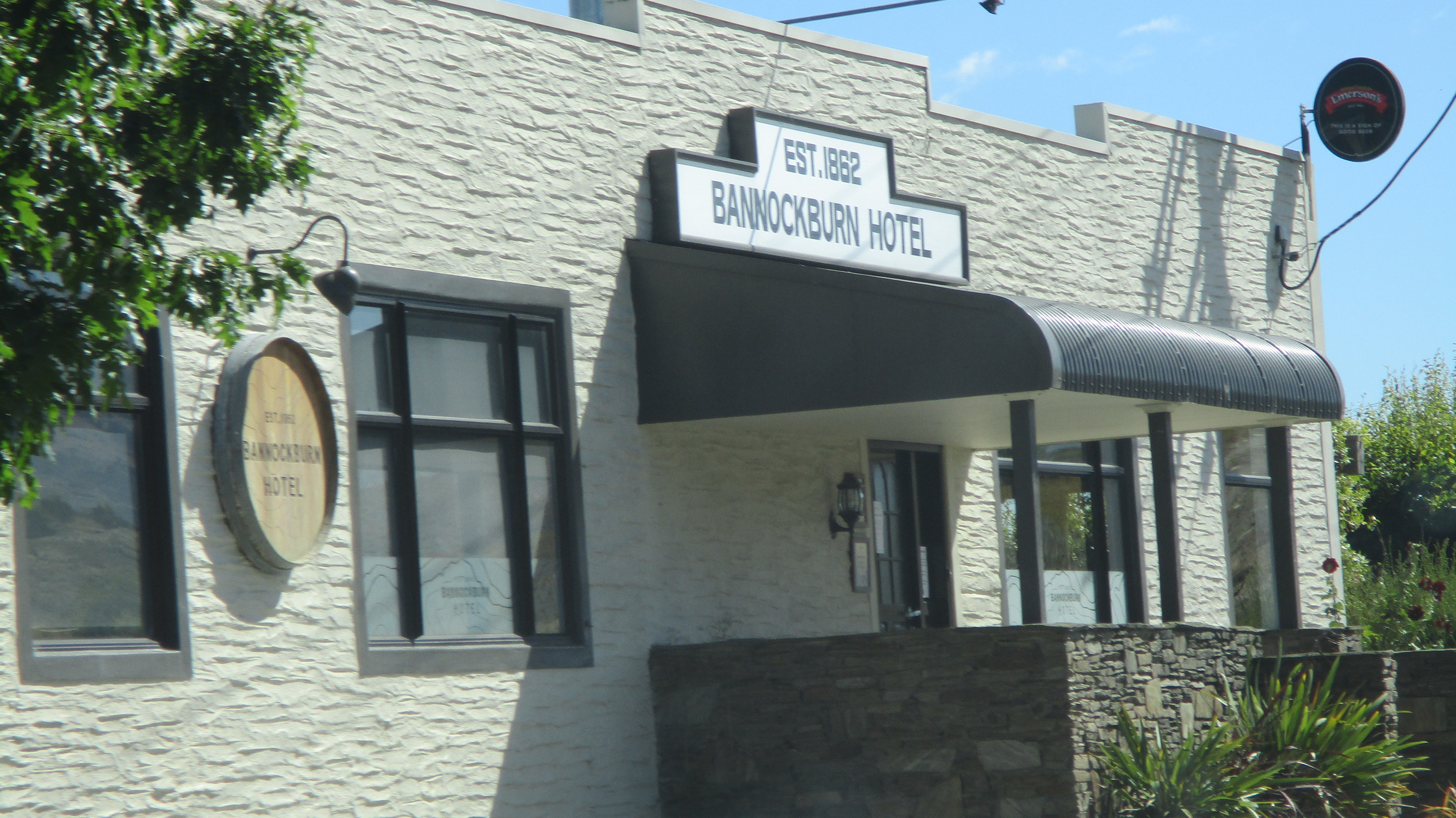
- Bannockburn Hotel
- Interactive map of Bannockburn
- Coordinates: 45°05′21.2″S 169°09′40″E
- Country: New Zealand
- Region: Otago
- Territorial authority: Central Otago District
- Ward: Cromwell Ward
- Community: Cromwell Community
- Electorates: Waitaki; Te Tai Tonga (Māori)

Government
  - Territorial authority: Central Otago District Council
  - Regional council: Otago Regional Council
  - Mayor of Central Otago: Tamah Alley
  - Waitaki MP: Miles Anderson
  - Te Tai Tonga MP: Tākuta Ferris

Area
  - Total: 16.91 km^{2} (6.53 sq mi)

Population (June 2025)
  - Total: 580
  - Density: 34/km^{2} (89/sq mi)
- Time zone: UTC+12 (NZST)
  - Summer (DST): UTC+13 (NZDT)
- Local iwi: Ngāi Tahu

Bannockburn is a small historic gold mining town located outside of Cromwell in Central Otago, New Zealand.

The area was first made known as a rich alluvial gold field and was mined extensively in the 1860s.

Its uniquely warm, dry climate earned it the name 'The heart of the desert', as climatic conditions and human activity have combined to strip the area of most of the original native vegetation leaving rocks, sands and soils exposed. Today, these climate conditions make Bannockburn the home of many vineyards and stonefruit orchards.

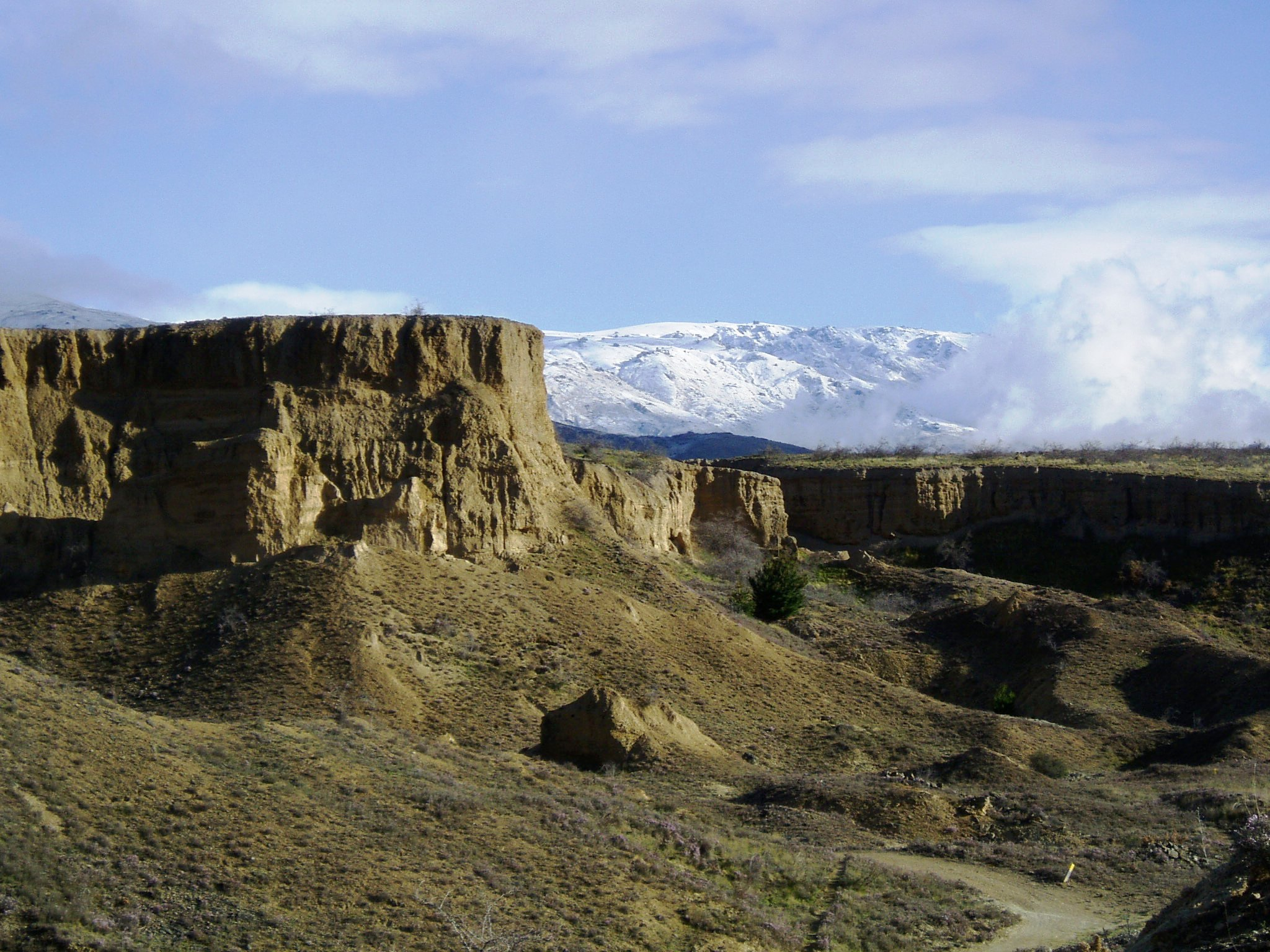
Gold sluicing in Bannockburn

== History ==
The plans for the settlement began in 1862, as a result of miners being forced upstream from rising water levels in the Clutha and Kawarau Rivers. Though the area was settled around this period, the population was not stationary. As miners followed gold up the creeks, the settlements tended to follow, and by 1868 the original settlement had been strung out along what is now the Bannockburn-Nevis road. As miners swept over the area, from 1862 to 1871 the face of the landscape underwent drastic changes as the alluvial flat was washed away by sluicing operations to the foreboding landscape that exists today. Water during this period was a pivotal resource, not just for mining but to supply the town as well. Evidence of the complex water system that once existed is spread throughout the landscape. Multiple dams, (technically reservoirs) feed a water system that extends from high on the nearby Carrick range down to the abandoned sluicing sites. Tippet's Dam was one of, if not the largest of these reservoirs. The water has since been redirected for horticultural and viticultural use and the sluicings rest dormant on land belonging to the Department of Conservation.

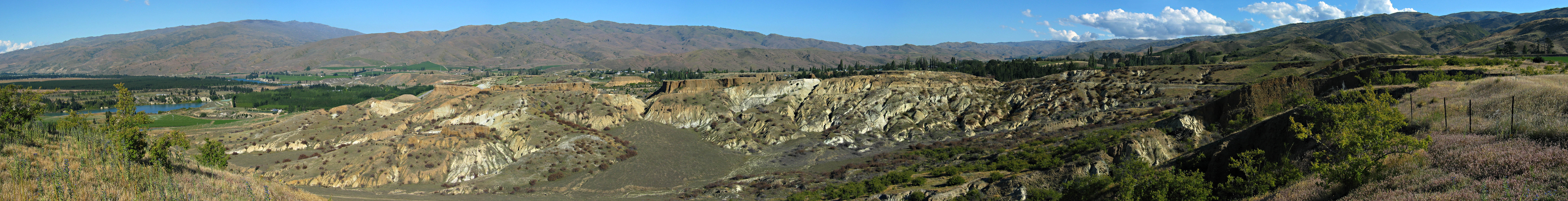
Panorama of the historic Bannockburn gold diggings near Cromwell.

== Demographics ==
Bannockburn is described by Statistics New Zealand as a rural settlement. It covers 16.91 km^{2} (6.53 sq mi). It had an estimated population of 580 as of June 2025, with a population density of 34 people per km^{2}. Bannockburn is part of the larger Lindis-Nevis Valleys statistical area.

Historical population
Year	Pop.	±% p.a.
2006	315	—
2013	378	+2.64%
2018	477	+4.76%

Bannockburn had a population of 477 at the 2018 New Zealand census, an increase of 99 people (26.2%) since the 2013 census, and an increase of 162 people (51.4%) since the 2006 census. There were 183 households, comprising 246 males and 234 females, giving a sex ratio of 1.05 males per female, with 57 people (11.9%) aged under 15 years, 63 (13.2%) aged 15 to 29, 240 (50.3%) aged 30 to 64, and 117 (24.5%) aged 65 or older.

Ethnicities were 94.3% European/Pākehā, 5.0% Māori, 0.6% Pasifika, 3.1% Asian, and 1.9% other ethnicities. People may identify with more than one ethnicity.

Although some people chose not to answer the census's question about religious affiliation, 59.7% had no religion, 26.4% were Christian and 4.4% had other religions.

Of those at least 15 years old, 99 (23.6%) people had a bachelor's or higher degree, and 60 (14.3%) people had no formal qualifications. 78 people (18.6%) earned over $70,000 compared to 17.2% nationally. The employment status of those at least 15 was that 234 (55.7%) people were employed full-time, 75 (17.9%) were part-time, and 6 (1.4%) were unemployed.

== Wine and tourism ==
Wine in this region, like the majority of Central Otago, focuses primarily on Pinot noir, suited to the dry climate and soils. The climate of Bannockburn epitomizes that of the Central Otago wine region and claims some of the highest temperatures and lowest rainfall in the area. The area is limited by geographical constraints to relatively small outputs, and most of the vineyards boast a boutique high quality wine with typically small volumes of grapes. Several internationally renowned vineyards exist within a small radius producing wine that is distributed often to an international base. Akarua, Bannock Brae, Felton Road, Mt. Difficulty and Terra Sancta are among a few of the internationally known wineries in this area.
