= Mount Stuart, New Zealand =

New Zealand settlement

Coordinates: 46°05′00″S 169°51′15″E

Mount Stuart is a rural locality and settlement in South Otago, New Zealand. It is located between Manuka Creek and Glenore on State Highway 8, approximately halfway between Milton and Waitahuna. It sits close to the upper reaches of the west branch of the Tokomairiro River, just below the confluence with the Manuka Stream.

Mount Stuart is notable for its 442-metre (1,450 ft) tunnel (also known as the Manuka Creek tunnel), formerly part of an access line for the Roxburgh Branch rail line, which is now open as a walking track. The 7.7 MW Mount Stuart Wind Farm, located 4 km to the northwest of the settlement, was commissioned in 2012. The wind farm sits atop the promontory which gives the settlement its name, at an altitude of 434 metres (1,424 ft).
