= Beaumont, New Zealand =

Settlement in Clutha District, Otago Region, New Zealand

Coordinates: 45°49′S 169°32′E

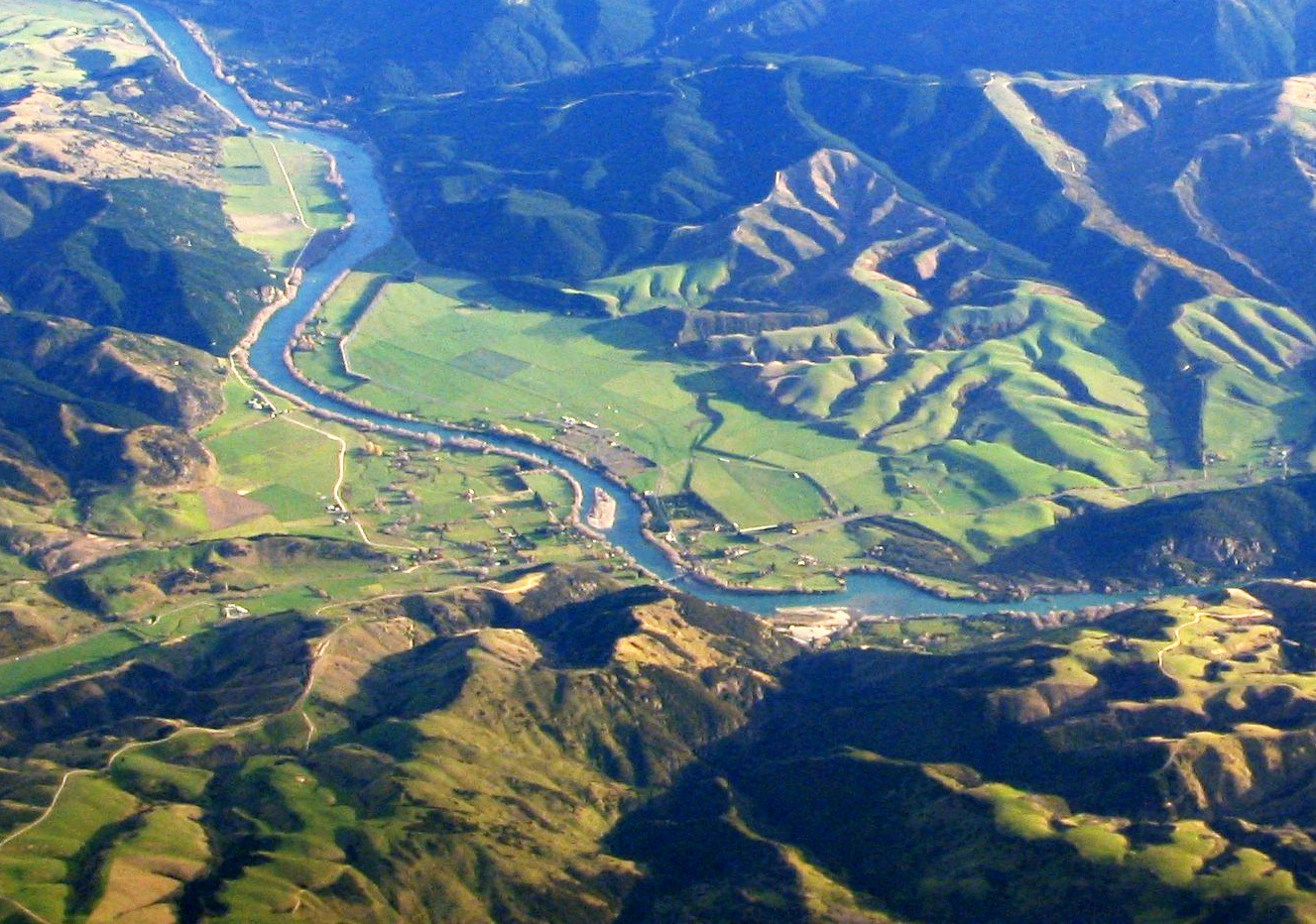
Aerial photo of the Beaumont area in 2006, State Highway 8 crosses the Clutha River just below centre

Beaumont is a small town in inland Otago, in the South Island of New Zealand. It is located on the Clutha River / Mata-Au six kilometres southeast of Raes Junction, between Roxburgh and Balclutha. Beaumont is connected to Milton and Roxburgh by State Highway 8.

Beaumont was named for Beaumont Burn, probably about 1857.

For eleven years, Beaumont served as the terminus of a branch line railway that ran from a junction with the Main South Line at Milton. The railway reached Beaumont in 1914; an extension to Millers Flat was opened in 1925. The line was ultimately reached Roxburgh as the Roxburgh Branch, operating until 1968. Relics of the railway still remain, including a stock yard and a bridge over the Beaumont River.

== Climate ==
Climate data for Beaumont (1981–2010)
Month	Jan	Feb	Mar	Apr	May	Jun	Jul	Aug	Sep	Oct	Nov	Dec	Year
Mean daily maximum °C (°F)	21.6 (70.9)	21.3 (70.3)	19.3 (66.7)	16.7 (62.1)	12.6 (54.7)	9.5 (49.1)	9.1 (48.4)	12.1 (53.8)	14.7 (58.5)	16.7 (62.1)	18.5 (65.3)	20.0 (68.0)	16.0 (60.8)
Daily mean °C (°F)	15.6 (60.1)	15.2 (59.4)	13.4 (56.1)	10.8 (51.4)	7.8 (46.0)	4.9 (40.8)	4.3 (39.7)	6.4 (43.5)	8.8 (47.8)	10.7 (51.3)	12.5 (54.5)	14.2 (57.6)	10.4 (50.7)
Mean daily minimum °C (°F)	9.5 (49.1)	9.1 (48.4)	7.5 (45.5)	4.9 (40.8)	3.0 (37.4)	0.2 (32.4)	−0.6 (30.9)	0.7 (33.3)	2.9 (37.2)	4.6 (40.3)	6.5 (43.7)	8.5 (47.3)	4.7 (40.5)
Average rainfall mm (inches)	102.0 (4.02)	105.7 (4.16)	105.1 (4.14)	70.8 (2.79)	122.0 (4.80)	58.5 (2.30)	107.5 (4.23)	66.2 (2.61)	91.1 (3.59)	81.2 (3.20)	75.9 (2.99)	94.8 (3.73)	1,080.8 (42.56)
Source: NIWA
