= Mt Stuart Wind Farm =

Wind farm in New Zealand

- Country: New Zealand
- Location: Otago
- Coordinates: 46°03′20″S 169°46′30″E
- Status: Operational
- Construction began: April 2011
- Commission date: June 2012
- Owner: Pioneer Generation

Wind farm
- Type: Onshore
- Hub height: 45 m (148 ft)
- Rotor diameter: 52 m (171 ft)
- Rated wind speed: 17 m/s (61 km/h; 38 mph)

Power generation
- Units operational: 9
- Make and model: Gamesa: G52
- Nameplate capacity: 7.7 MW
- Annual net output: 25.6 GWh

External links
- Website: www.pioneergen.co.nz/Projects.aspx

The Mt Stuart Wind Farm is a wind farm in New Zealand constructed by Pioneer Generation. It is located close to the settlements of Manuka Creek and Mount Stuart, 15 kilometres west of Milton in the Otago region of the South Island. It stands at an altitude of 434 metres (1,424 ft) atop the promontory which gives it its name.

Resource consents were granted in February 2010. Construction began in April 2011 and the nine turbine wind farm was commissioned in June 2012.

== See also ==
- Wind power in New Zealand
- List of power stations in New Zealand
