= State Highway 8 (New Zealand) =

Road in New Zealand

State Highway 8

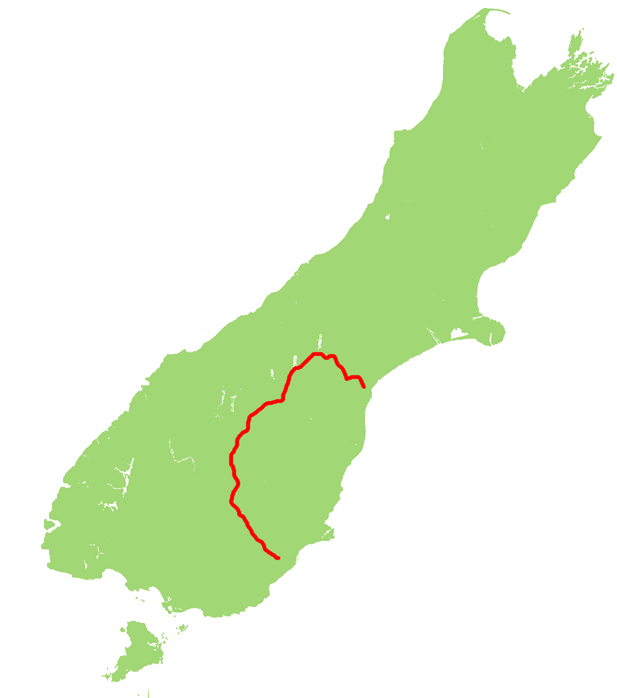

Route information
- Maintained by NZ Transport Agency Waka Kotahi
- Length: 457 km (284 mi)

Major junctions
- North (clockwise) end: SH 1 (Hilton Highway) at Washdyke
- SH 8A (Bells Lane) to SH 6 near Tarras; SH 8B to SH 6 near Cromwell
- South (anticlockwise) end: SH 1 at Clarksville

Location
- Country: New Zealand
- Primary destinations: Pleasant Point, Fairlie, Lake Tekapo, Twizel, Omarama, Cromwell, Clyde, Alexandra, Roxburgh, Lawrence

Highway system
- New Zealand state highways; Motorways and expressways; List
← SH 7	→ SH 10

State Highway 8 is one of New Zealand's eight national highways. It forms an anticlockwise loop through the southern scenic regions of the Mackenzie Basin and Central Otago, starting and terminating in junctions with State Highway 1. Distances are measured from north to south.

For most of its length SH8 is a two-lane single carriageway, with at-grade intersections and property accesses directly off the road, both in rural and urban areas.

== Route ==
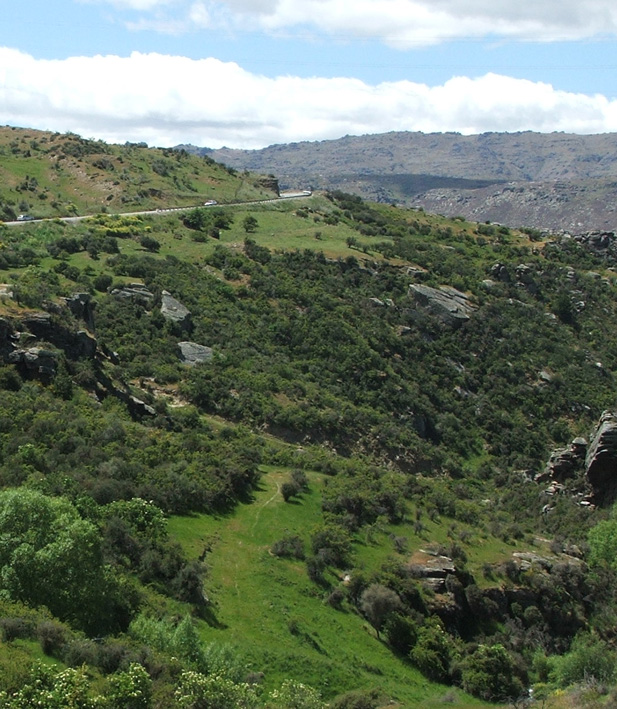
NZSH 8 runs through rugged terrain, such as the rocky hill country south of Alexandra.

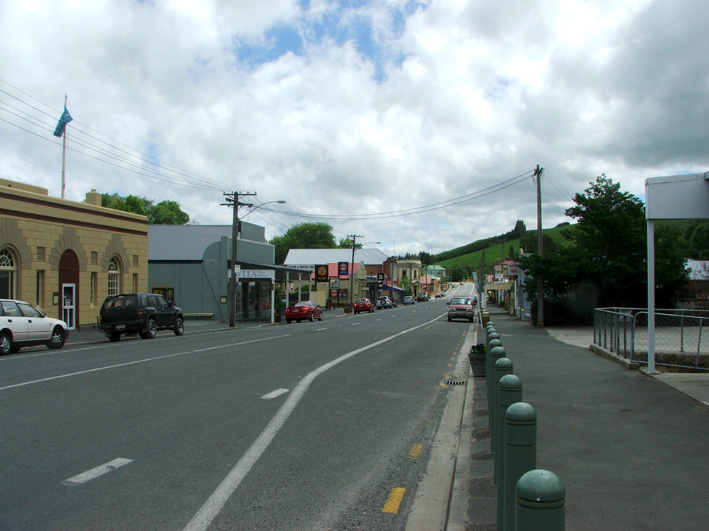
State Highway 8 runs through Lawrence.

=== Main route ===
The highway leaves SH1 at Washdyke, an industrial suburb of Timaru, travelling initially northwest through Pleasant Point then continuing to the town of Fairlie. From here the route tends westward and rapidly increases in altitude, passing the southern end of the two great Mackenzie Basin lakes of Tekapo and Pukaki.

From Pukaki the highway turns southwest across the upper reaches of the Waitaki Valley, passing through the former hydroelectricity service town of Twizel and Omarama before again climbing to cross the Lindis Pass, which, at 971 metres, is the highest point on the highway's path. The highway winds along the valley of the Lindis River, reaching the upper Clutha River not far from Tarras.

From here, the highway runs close to the eastern shore of the man-made Lake Dunstan before passing the historic town of Cromwell. The highway turns south as it travels through the Cromwell Gorge passing the country's third largest hydroelectric dam, the Clyde Dam at Clyde. The highway continues along the Clutha Valley through the town of Alexandra and past Lake Roxburgh to the town of Roxburgh. Much of this part of the highway's journey is past fruit orchards, and historic gold-diggings from the Otago gold rush.

From Roxburgh, the highway turns southeastward, passing Ettrick, Raes Junction and Beaumont, where it turns away from the Clutha, before reaching Lawrence, close to the original strike in the Otago gold rush. From here, the highway continues past Waitahuna and the twisting Manuka Gorge, reaching the plain of the Tokomairaro River at Clarksville, three kilometres south of Milton.

=== Spur sections ===
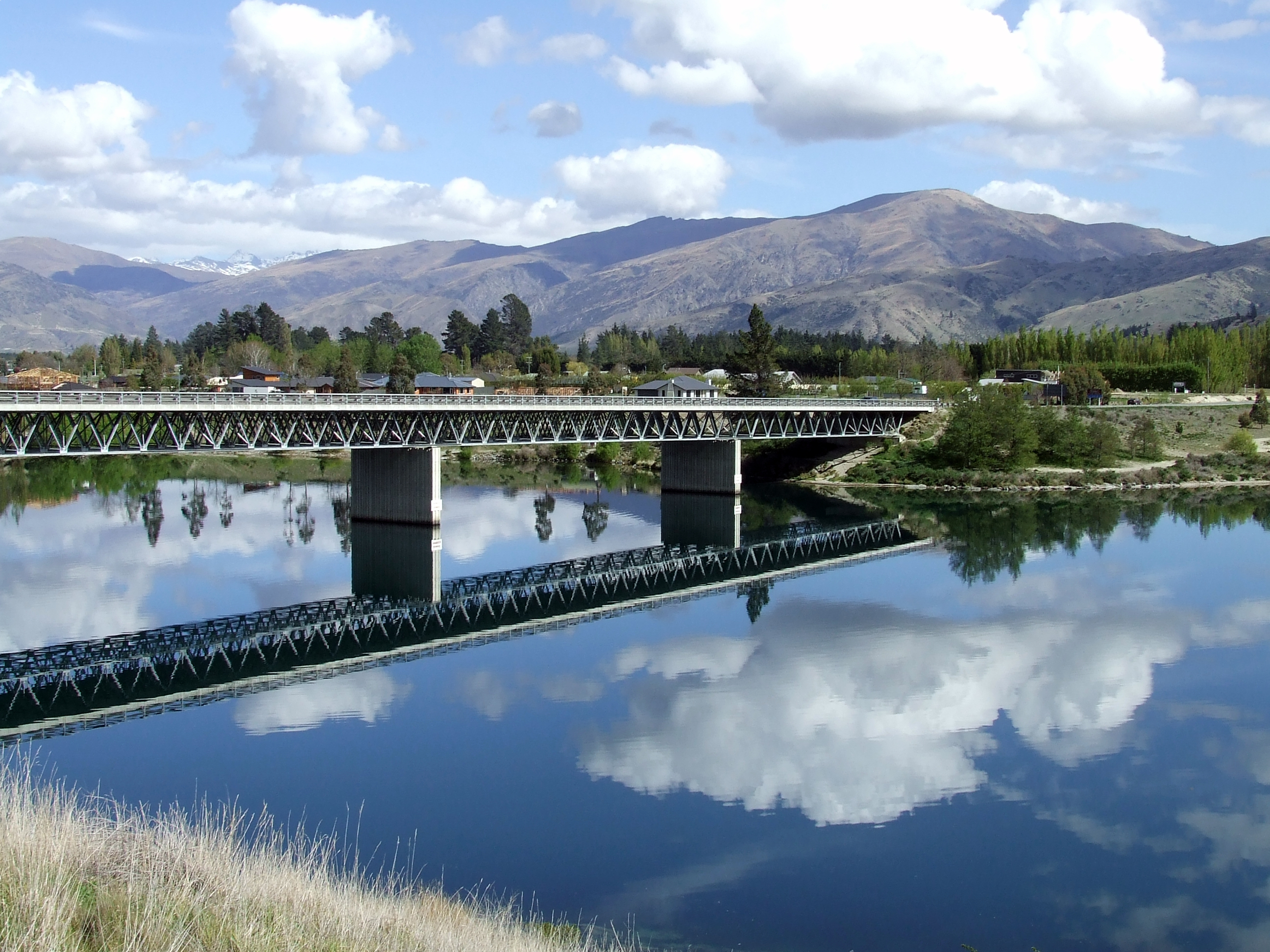
Deadmans Point bridge, looking towards Cromwell

State Highway 8 has two spurs: State Highway 8A and State Highway 8B. These two spurs connect the highway with State Highway 6, which lies on the western bank of Lake Dunstan. State Highway 8A runs for 23 km from SH 6 at Luggate to connect with SH8 close to Tarras. State Highway 8B runs for just 2.6 km from SH8 at Deadmans Point across the lake to the town of Cromwell. SH 8B forms part of the main route between Queenstown and Christchurch.

=== Route changes ===
The course of SH8 between Clyde and Tarras was substantially altered during the 1980s as part of the construction of the Clyde Dam, which flooded much of the Cromwell Gorge, including the former route of the highway. A completely new section was built between Clyde and Cromwell; for SH8B the old single-lane bridge crossing the Clutha was replaced with a new two-lane bridge approximately 1.5 km to the north.

== History ==
The southern end of SH8 between Clarksville and Cromwell roughly follows the route taken by many miners and prospectors during the Otago gold rush of the 1860s. Many of the important sites of the gold rush lie close to the Highway and the Kawarau Gorge which extends to the northwest from Cromwell. These include the town of Lawrence, which was the hub of prospecting around the original gold strike at Gabriel's Gully.

The former Roxburgh Branch rail line ran roughly parallel with the highway's southern course for much of its length.

== Statistics ==
In 2006, SH8 had an annual average daily traffic volume (AADT – daily estimate) of between 1,188 vehicles at Bendigo, and 4,897 vehicles on the Clyde side of Alexandra. Over the eleven sites measured, between 9.0% and 15.3% of the vehicles were classified as heavy (3.5 tonnes or greater). For the spurs, SH8A AADT ranged from 646 to 858 vehicles, while the volume of vehicles on SH8B was 3,930 on Deadmans Point Bridge, and 4,500 near the SH6 junction.

== Major intersections ==
Territorial authority	Location	km	mi	Destinations	Notes
Timaru District	Washdyke	0	0.0	SH 1 north – Temuka, Christchurch; SH 1 south – Timaru, Dunedin	SH 8 begins
Mackenzie District	Fairlie	57	35	SH 79 – Geraldine, Christchurch	
Mackenzie District	Burkes Pass	83	52	Burkes Pass 706 m (2,316 ft)	
Mackenzie District	Lake Pukaki	146	91	SH 80 – Glentanner, Aoraki / Mount Cook	
Waitaki District	Omarama	185	115	SH 83 – Kurow, Oamaru	
Waitaki District / Central Otago District boundary	Lindis Pass	219	136	Lindis Pass 972 m (3,189 ft)	
Central Otago District	Tarras	267	166	SH 8A – Wānaka, West Coast	
Central Otago District	Cromwell	294	183	SH 8B – Cromwell, Queenstown	
Central Otago District	Alexandra	328	204	SH 85 – Ranfurly, Dunedin	
Central Otago District / Clutha District boundary	Raes Junction	397	247	SH 90 – Tapanui, Gore	
Clutha District	Clarksville	460	290	SH 1 north – Milton, Dunedin; SH 1 south – Balclutha, Invercargill	SH 8 ends
