= Raes Junction =

Settlement in Otago Region, New Zealand

Coordinates: 45°47′S 169°28′E

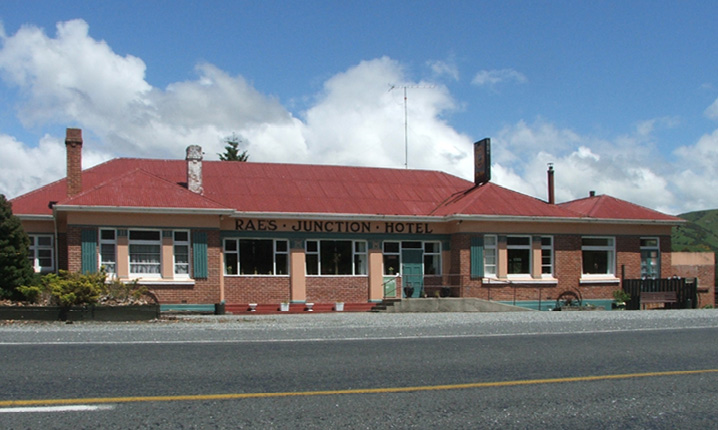
Raes Junction Hotel

Raes Junction is a small settlement in New Zealand, located at the intersection of State Highways 8 and 90, in the lower South Island. The highways that meet at the junction are the main routes to the Clutha valley for travellers from Dunedin and Invercargill respectively.

Raes Junction is 62 kilometres (39 mi) by road from Milton, 67 kilometres (42 mi) from Gore, and 72 kilometres (45 mi) from Alexandra. The junction lies 3 kilometres (1.9 mi) to the south of the Clutha River. The nearest town of any significant size is Lawrence, which is 25 kilometres (16 mi) to the southeast.

The area was named after James Rae, who operated J. Rae's Junction Hotel during the late-1800s. The name for the area later became just Rae's Junction, and eventually the possessive apostrophe was lost. The area was also known as Bastings, after Horace Bastings, a member of the Otago Provincial Council.

Although the settlement itself is little more than a farming and horticultural community, its location at this mid-way junction is thus of considerable regional importance, as is the larger settlement of Beaumont, some six kilometres to the southeast. The Raes Junction school opened in around 1884 and closed in 1927.

== Notable people ==
- Mary Rae – nurse
