= Ettrick, New Zealand =

Town in the South Island of New Zealand

Ettrick
- Town
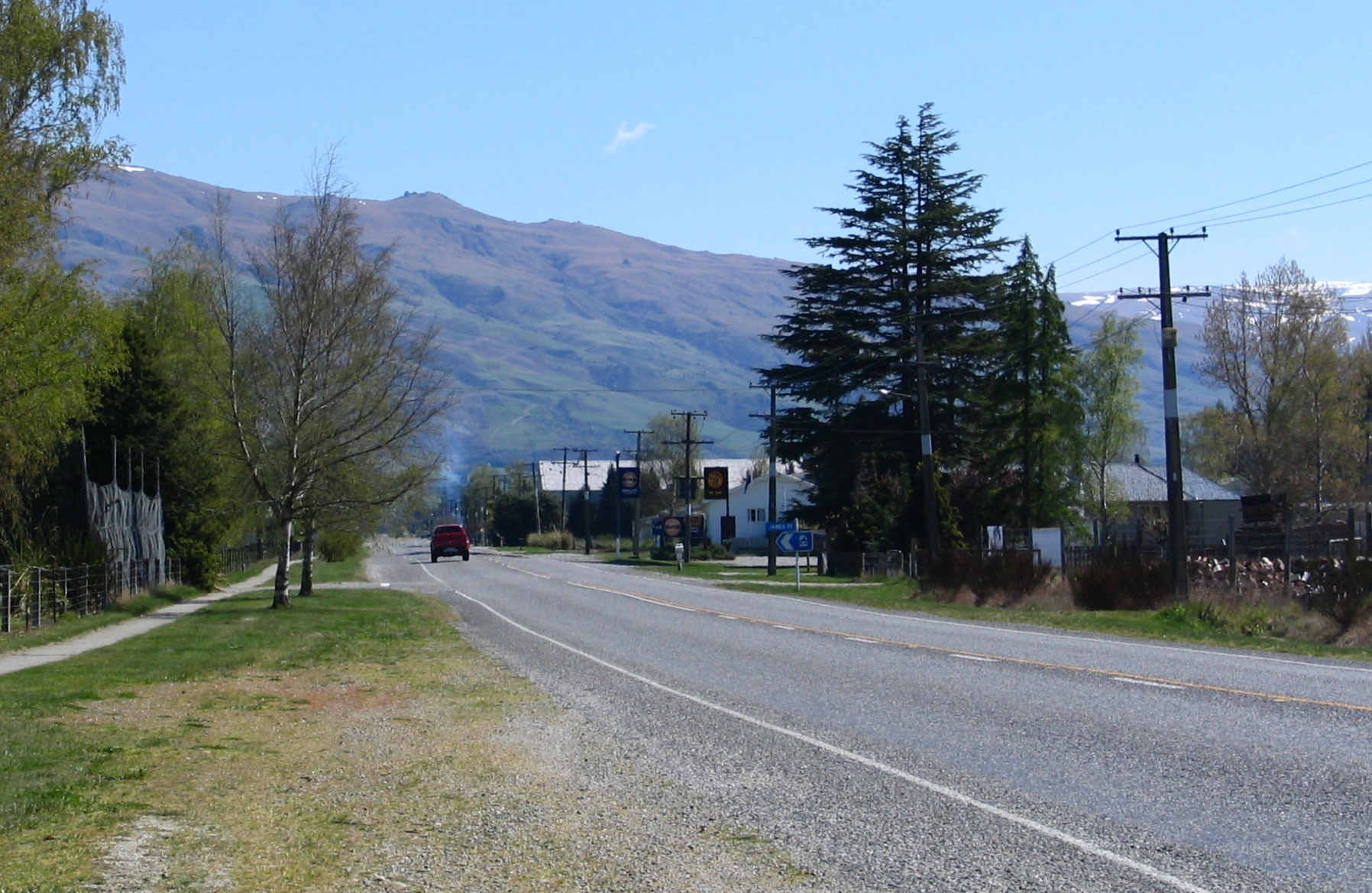
- Looking along State Highway 8 at Ettrick
- Interactive map of Ettrick
- Coordinates: 45°37′58.9″S 169°21′43.8″E
- Country: New Zealand
- Region: Otago region
- Territorial authorities: Central Otago District
- Ward: Teviot Valley Ward
- Community: Teviot Valley Community
- Electorates: Southland; Te Tai Tonga (Māori)

Government
  - Territorial authority: Central Otago District Council
  - Regional council: Otago Regional Council
  - Mayor of Central Otago: Tamah Alley
  - Southland MP: Joseph Mooney
  - Te Tai Tonga MP: Tākuta Ferris

Area
  - Urban area: 8.17 km^{2} (3.15 sq mi)

Population (June 2025)
  - Urban area: 170
  - Density: 21/km^{2} (54/sq mi)
- Time zone: UTC+12 (NZST)
  - Summer (DST): UTC+13 (NZDT)
- Postcode: 9572
- Area code: 03
- Local iwi: Ngāi Tahu

Ettrick is a small town in inland Otago, in the South Island of New Zealand.

== Geography ==
Ettrick is located on the Clutha River and State Highway 8 south of Roxburgh and five kilometres northwest of the small settlement of Millers Flat. Like many other settlements in the area, all of Ettrick's streets are named after towns in the Scottish Borders.

== History ==
Ettrick was founded by Scottish settlers during the Otago gold rush in the 1860s, and was named after the Ettrick Valley in Scotland. Ettrick was one of the first places in New Zealand where settlers started to grow apples. Today the main income is from farming, sheep and beef, dairy and a dwindling number of fruit growers, mainly apple.

The town also has a quaint tearoom, which caters to visitors and was the background for a Toyota Hilux advertisement in 2011.

== Demographics ==
Ettrick is described by Statistics New Zealand as a rural settlement. It covers 8.17 km^{2} (3.15 sq mi) and had an estimated population of 170 as of June 2025, with a population density of 21 people per km^{2}. It is part of the much larger Teviot Valley statistical area.

Historical population
Year	Pop.	±% p.a.
2006	174	—
2013	174	+0.00%
2018	171	−0.35%

Ettrick had a population of 171 at the 2018 New Zealand census, a decrease of 3 people (−1.7%) since the 2013 census, and a decrease of 3 people (−1.7%) since the 2006 census. There were 75 households, comprising 102 males and 69 females, giving a sex ratio of 1.48 males per female. The median age was 49.0 years (compared with 37.4 years nationally), with 15 people (8.8%) aged under 15 years, 24 (14.0%) aged 15 to 29, 90 (52.6%) aged 30 to 64, and 42 (24.6%) aged 65 or older.

Ethnicities were 84.2% European/Pākehā, 1.8% Māori, 14.0% Pasifika, and 3.5% Asian. People may identify with more than one ethnicity.

Although some people chose not to answer the census's question about religious affiliation, 35.1% had no religion, 52.6% were Christian, 1.8% were Hindu and 0.0% had other religions.

Of those at least 15 years old, 12 (7.7%) people had a bachelor's or higher degree, and 33 (21.2%) people had no formal qualifications. The median income was $25,000, compared with $31,800 nationally. 12 people (7.7%) earned over $70,000 compared to 17.2% nationally. The employment status of those at least 15 was that 87 (55.8%) people were employed full-time, and 24 (15.4%) were part-time.

== "McEttrick" ==
In 2009, New Zealand's only McDonald's-themed museum opened to the public in Ettrick, boasting the largest collection of McDonald's paraphernalia in the Southern Hemisphere.

Alan Garthwaite, the collector and owner of the museum, has been collecting McDonald's knick-knacks for over 25 years. His collection consists of burger boxes, cups, hats, toys, watches, badges, dolls and uniforms, some dating back 40 years.

== Climate ==
Climate data for Ettrick (1991–2020 normals, 1983–present)
Month	Jan	Feb	Mar	Apr	May	Jun	Jul	Aug	Sep	Oct	Nov	Dec	Year
Record high °C (°F)	34.6 (94.3)	36.1 (97.0)	33.5 (92.3)	27.0 (80.6)	24.7 (76.5)	24.1 (75.4)	19.5 (67.1)	21.0 (69.8)	26.6 (79.9)	28.1 (82.6)	30.5 (86.9)	34.0 (93.2)	36.1 (97.0)
Mean maximum °C (°F)	31.2 (88.2)	31.1 (88.0)	28.6 (83.5)	24.0 (75.2)	20.2 (68.4)	16.8 (62.2)	16.1 (61.0)	18.3 (64.9)	21.6 (70.9)	24.6 (76.3)	26.8 (80.2)	29.7 (85.5)	31.2 (88.2)
Mean daily maximum °C (°F)	22.9 (73.2)	22.6 (72.7)	20.5 (68.9)	17.0 (62.6)	13.6 (56.5)	10.1 (50.2)	9.7 (49.5)	12.2 (54.0)	15.1 (59.2)	17.0 (62.6)	18.9 (66.0)	21.5 (70.7)	16.8 (62.2)
Daily mean °C (°F)	16.1 (61.0)	15.7 (60.3)	13.7 (56.7)	10.5 (50.9)	7.8 (46.0)	5.1 (41.2)	4.5 (40.1)	6.4 (43.5)	8.8 (47.8)	10.6 (51.1)	12.4 (54.3)	14.9 (58.8)	10.5 (51.0)
Mean daily minimum °C (°F)	9.4 (48.9)	8.8 (47.8)	6.8 (44.2)	4.1 (39.4)	1.9 (35.4)	0.2 (32.4)	−0.7 (30.7)	0.6 (33.1)	2.4 (36.3)	4.1 (39.4)	6.0 (42.8)	8.2 (46.8)	4.3 (39.8)
Mean minimum °C (°F)	2.8 (37.0)	2.1 (35.8)	0.1 (32.2)	−2.4 (27.7)	−4.1 (24.6)	−5.2 (22.6)	−5.9 (21.4)	−4.9 (23.2)	−3.5 (25.7)	−1.9 (28.6)	−0.3 (31.5)	1.5 (34.7)	−6.2 (20.8)
Record low °C (°F)	0.0 (32.0)	−1.6 (29.1)	−2.1 (28.2)	−6.0 (21.2)	−9.5 (14.9)	−7.6 (18.3)	−8.5 (16.7)	−7.0 (19.4)	−6.5 (20.3)	−4.5 (23.9)	−2.6 (27.3)	−0.6 (30.9)	−9.5 (14.9)
Average rainfall mm (inches)	60.0 (2.36)	53.7 (2.11)	42.5 (1.67)	45.8 (1.80)	45.8 (1.80)	42.9 (1.69)	29.4 (1.16)	30.2 (1.19)	39.0 (1.54)	55.2 (2.17)	55.5 (2.19)	62.3 (2.45)	562.3 (22.13)
Source: NIWA

Climate data for Moa Flat, elevation 410 m (1,350 ft), (1971–2000)
Month	Jan	Feb	Mar	Apr	May	Jun	Jul	Aug	Sep	Oct	Nov	Dec	Year
Mean daily maximum °C (°F)	19.8 (67.6)	19.8 (67.6)	17.6 (63.7)	14.7 (58.5)	10.6 (51.1)	7.5 (45.5)	7.2 (45.0)	9.1 (48.4)	11.9 (53.4)	14.2 (57.6)	16.4 (61.5)	18.3 (64.9)	13.9 (57.1)
Daily mean °C (°F)	13.9 (57.0)	13.9 (57.0)	12.1 (53.8)	9.7 (49.5)	6.5 (43.7)	3.9 (39.0)	3.6 (38.5)	5.0 (41.0)	7.1 (44.8)	9.0 (48.2)	10.8 (51.4)	12.8 (55.0)	9.0 (48.2)
Mean daily minimum °C (°F)	7.9 (46.2)	8.0 (46.4)	6.6 (43.9)	4.6 (40.3)	2.4 (36.3)	0.2 (32.4)	0.0 (32.0)	0.8 (33.4)	2.2 (36.0)	3.9 (39.0)	5.2 (41.4)	7.3 (45.1)	4.1 (39.4)
Average rainfall mm (inches)	85 (3.3)	61 (2.4)	75 (3.0)	68 (2.7)	74 (2.9)	61 (2.4)	46 (1.8)	42 (1.7)	50 (2.0)	64 (2.5)	70 (2.8)	78 (3.1)	774 (30.6)
Source: NIWA (rain 1951–1980)
