= Manuka Creek =

Stream in Otago, New Zealand

Coordinates: 46°03′30″S 169°48′30″E

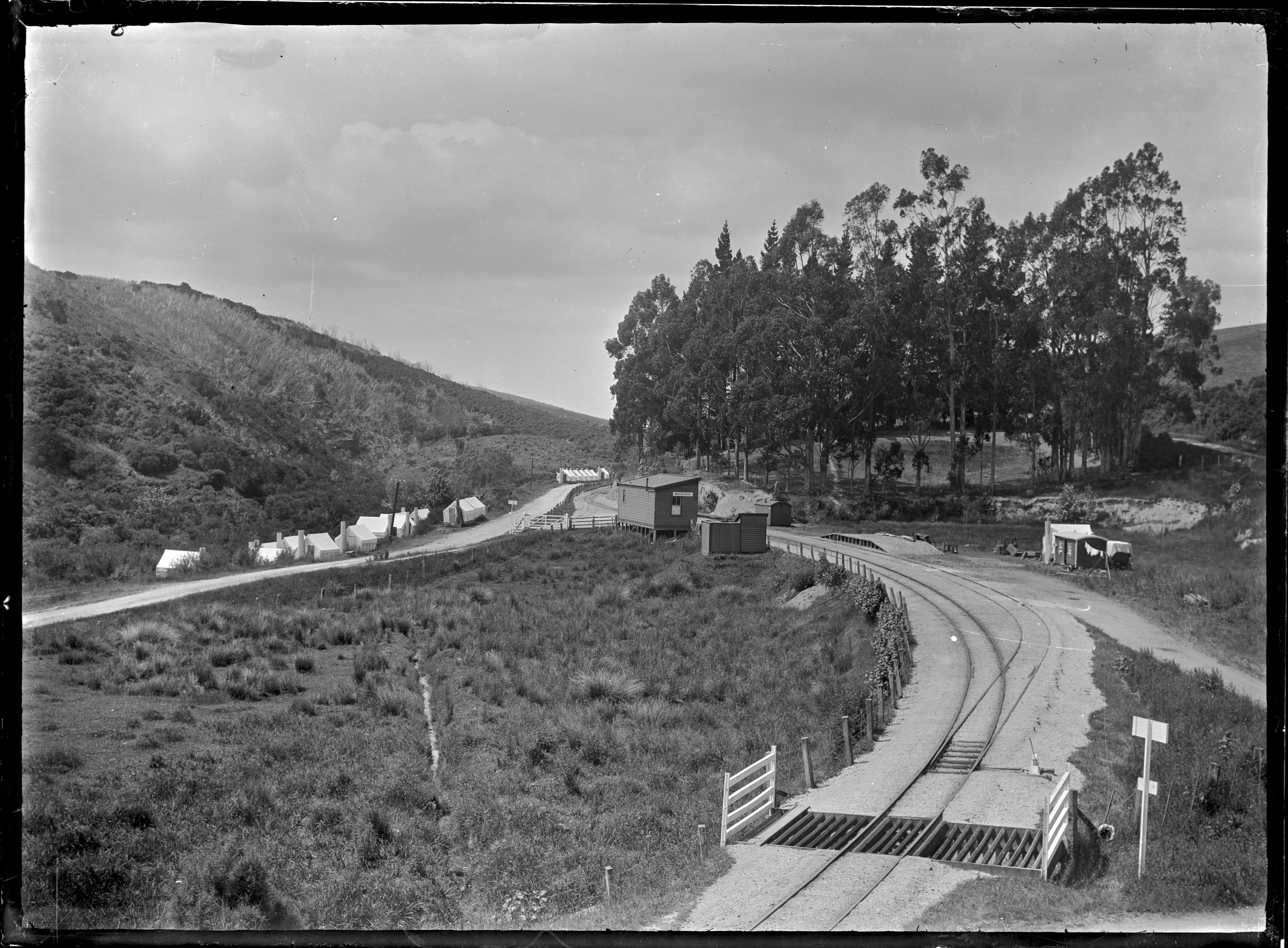
Manuka Railway Station at Manuka Creek in the Clutha District, circa 1920

Manuka Creek is a locality in Otago, New Zealand, on the banks of the Manuka Stream (also often called Manuka Creek), a tributary of the Tokomairiro River. It is located a short distance to the east of State Highway 8. The Manuka Railway Station on the Roxburgh Branch line was located by it. Herbert Deveril and Albert Percy Godber photographed the railway station. The creek was once a busy site for gold mining.

Immediately to the north of the settlement, the state highway passes through the Manuka Gorge, a narrow stretch along the upper course of the Manuka Stream. Immediately above the gorge, the highway crosses a small saddle before descending along the valley of a tributary of the Waitāhuna River.
