= Lonely Graves Historic Reserve =

Cemetery in Central Otago, New Zealand

Coordinates: 45°43′31″S 169°28′48″E

The Lonely Graves Historic Reserve is an old gold mining cemetery in Central Otago, New Zealand. It is in an area which was known as Horseshoe Bend, on the eastern bank of the Clutha/Mata-Au River, about 10 km downstream from the township of Millers Flat. The Reserve is administered by the New Zealand Department of Conservation.

== History ==
In 1865 William Rigney, a gold miner, came to these diggings, having been at Gabriel’s Gully after arriving in Otago in 1861. He learnt of an unmarked grave in the area, and, by his own account, he and a John Ord erected a “fence of rough manuka poles” around it. According to Rigney, the body had been found on the beach on the west side of the Clutha opposite the upper end of Horseshoe Bend “in the early days”. In Rigney's words “I don't know the time, but it was before I came to the locality in 1865”.

Shortly after erecting the fence, Rigney obtained a board of black pine, shaped it like a headstone, painted it white and with a tomahawk and a four-inch nail carved the words “Somebody's darling lies buried here” on it. (At a later stage, the words appear to have been burnt in also, as a close look at the remains of the headboard shows.) By 1902, with the board having badly decayed, the community expressed its interest in the grave by raising sufficient funds to install a marble headstone in its place. At this time, Rigney expressed his satisfaction that this was to be done, saying “I have always felt a special interest in that grave, as I have a foreboding that in the end my lot will be the same – viz., a lonely grave on a bleak hillside”. The headstone was completed in 1903, with Rigney's words engraved on it, along with the dates 1865 and 1903 to recognise the possible time of Rigney's installation of the wooden headboard and the date the new headstone was erected.

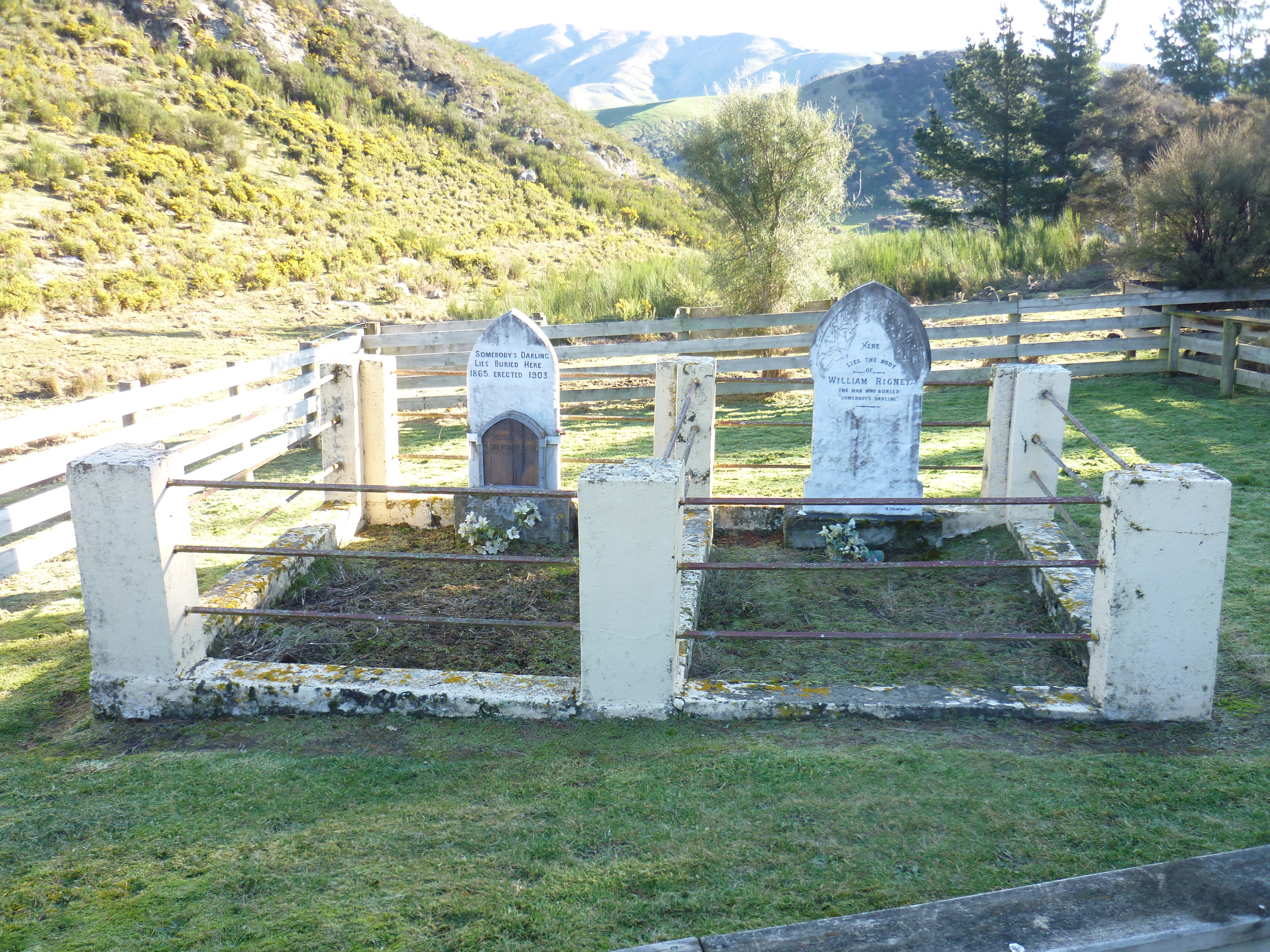

In the photograph, Rigney's grave is on the right. On the left is the grave of “Somebody's Darling”, with the remains of Rigney's wooden headboard attached to the marble headstone. At the Reserve, the Department of Conservation has erected an interpretation panel which reads:

“In 1863 this quiet rural area supported a goldfield called Horseshoe Bend and approximately 200 miners and storekeepers. By 1865 there were only 72 people left, supported by 6 hotels. According to popular legend, in 1865 William Rigney found the body of a young man washed up on a beach at Horseshoe Bend. After the inquest into the death of the unknown man, Rigney arranged for his burial and later marked the grave with a wooden headboard stating “Somebody's Darling Lies Buried Here.” Unfortunately this is just a story. The body was found in February 1865 but not by Rigney. An inquest confirmed that it was probably the body of Charles Alms, a butcher from the Nevis Valley, who drowned on the 25 January at Clyde, while herding cattle across the Clutha River. There is no record of who buried the body. Some time later Rigney and another miner put a manuka fence around the grave, and Rigney provided the wooden headboard. The story was first published in the Tuapeka Times in 1901, and Rigney wrote a letter to the editor explaining that he had neither found nor buried the body. Nevertheless, when Rigney died in 1912 he was buried beside “Somebody's Darling,” and the words “Here lies the body of William Rigney, the man who buried Somebody's Darling,” were placed on his gravestone. The story has stuck – the truth shouldn't get in the way of a good story!”

The “popular legend”, related on the panel, is a reference to an untitled manuscript written by a local identity, Mr R T Stewart in 1942 This is an account of Horseshoe Bend and the story of the ‘lonely grave’ in which Stewart wrongly attributes the finding and burial of the body to Rigney. His words were probably written for a radio broadcast and are the only ones that are possibly based on some first-hand knowledge. It is hard to separate fact from fiction in Stewart's work and it is therefore of little value as an historical document. Later, the original headboard was salvaged, renovated, including removing the vestiges of Rigney's white paint, enclosed in an airtight glass-fronted case, and installed against the new headstone, all by Stewart, who, as a boy, had known Rigney. The first mention of the lonely grave was in a local newspaper in 1897 (and not 1901 as stated on the panel), and a further item in 1901 prompted Rigney to write to the editor to correct items in it. He explained that “The body which is buried there was found on the beach on the west side of the river opposite the upper end of Horseshoe Bend in the early days. I don't know the time, but it was before I came to the locality in 1865.” These are the only facts concerning the body in the grave. The reference on the panel to the identity of the body in the grave is taken from an inquest held at Horseshoe Bend on 22 February 1865 of a body found at Rag Beach on the west bank of the Clutha above Horseshoe Bend. Earlier local newspapers had reported the drowning of a young man named Charles Elm on 25 January 1865 at Mutton Town Creek. The surname of the body referred to above is uncertain, as various phonetic versions of the name are all that exist. The handwritten coroner's report shows a capital “E” overwritten with an “A”, indicating that the coroner was not sure, based on the oral evidence given, just what the deceased's name was. To add to the confusion, the Otago Police Gazette's entry gives the name Charles Elms. The coroner's report concerns “the body of a person name unknown, but supposed to be that of one Charles Alms”. While there is no record of who buried this body, neither is there any record of where it was buried. Another manifestation of Rigney's abiding concern for the lonely grave was his effort to have the area surrounding the lonely grave established as a cemetery. In 1885 Rigney, on behalf of the residents of Horseshoe Bend petitioned the Tuapeka County Council for the land around “the graves of several persons buried some years ago” be fenced off as a cemetery. The land, an area of about 0.7 of a hectare, was duly surveyed but was not gazetted as a cemetery until 1901. In 1928 the cemetery was closed and in 1980 the land was designated a reserve to be administered by the Department of Conservation. It is now known as the Lonely Graves Historic Reserve. No details of any other graves are known. Rigney throughout his lifetime expressed a wish to be buried beside the “lonely grave”. When he died in 1912, it was thanks again to the local community that his wish was granted. The community's generosity also was able to provide a marble headstone for his grave. The headstone bears the words: “Here lies the man who buried Somebody's Darling.”
