= Jimmy's Pies =

Pie making New Zealand company

- Industry: Food
- Founded: 1960; 66 years ago
- Founder: Jimmy Kirkpatrick
- Headquarters: 143 Scotland Street; Roxburgh, New Zealand
- Area served: South Island, New Zealand
- Products: Meat pies
- Website: jimmyspies.co.nz

Jimmy's Pies is a New Zealand company based in Roxburgh. It has been producing primarily meat pies since 1960. It is a family business, now run by founder Jimmy Kirkpatrick's son Dennis.

== History ==
Jimmy Kirkpatrick started the business, originally called "Jimmy's Bakery", in 1960 after moving to Roxburgh from Invercargill with his family. After Jimmy died in 1976, the business was taken over by his son and daughter-in-law, Dennis and Jean Kirkpatrick.

Production was disrupted for several days in November 2017 after flooding in Roxburgh damaged the town's water supply. The bakery itself was not significantly affected, having been flood-proofed after a flood in 1978.

In October 2018, the Ministry for Primary Industries issued a recall notice for Jimmy's Pies after a man had a severe allergic reaction to monosodium glutamate (MSG) in a pie. Jimmy's Pies' beef stock supplier had reintroduced MSG to their product without informing them, and thus MSG was not included in the ingredients list on the packaging.

In November 2018, Jimmy's Pies began selling most of its products exclusively through its Roxburgh store. Only their most popular products, mince pies and mince and cheese pies, would continue to be sold elsewhere.

In May 2020, Jimmy's Pies won Canstar Blue's Most Satisfied Customers Award, beating twelve other New Zealand pie brands.
