= Roxburgh Branch =

Overview
- Other names: Tuapeka Branch Railway; Tokomairiro and Lawrence Railway; Lawrence Branch
- Status: Closed
- Owner: New Zealand Railways Department
- Locale: Otago, South Island
- Termini: Milton; Roxburgh
- Stations: 18

Service
- Type: Branch line
- System: New Zealand railway network
- Operator: New Zealand Railways Department

History
- Opened: 1877 (to Lawrence); 1914 (to Beaumont); 1925 (to Miller's Flat); 1928 (to Roxburgh)
- Closed: 31 May 1968

Technical
- Line length: 95 kilometres (59 mi)
- Track gauge: 1,067 mm (3 ft 6 in)

Map

The Roxburgh Branch was a branch line railway built in the Otago region of New Zealand's South Island that formed part of the country's national rail network. Originally known as the Lawrence Branch, it was one of the longest construction projects in New Zealand railway history, beginning in the 1870s and not finished until 1928. The full line was closed in 1968.

== Construction ==
The original reason for the line's construction was to provide better transport access to Lawrence, then known as Tuapeka, the site of New Zealand's first significant discovery of gold. Contracts for construction were let by mid-1873, and work on the line was well under way by the next year, with a junction with the Main South Line established at Clarksville. Slips and contractor bankruptcies presented delays, but on 22 January 1877, the line opened to Waitahuna, followed by Lawrence on 2 April 1877, 35.27 km from Clarksville.

Calls were made to extend the Lawrence Branch further, with some proposals suggesting a route via Roxburgh could serve as the railway to Alexandra and Central Otago in general (instead, the Otago Central Railway followed a more circuitous route via the Taieri and Maniototo). Decades passed until approval was granted to extend the line beyond its Lawrence terminus, with the next section to Big Hill (location of a tunnel between the Bowlers Flat and Craigellachie stations) opened on 4 October 1910. Upon completion of the 434-metre-long (1,424 ft) Big Hill tunnel, the line was opened to Beaumont on 15 December 1914, but World War I delayed construction and the next section to Millers Flat was not opened until 16 December 1925. The line was finally completed when the section from Millers Flat to Roxburgh was opened on 18 April 1928. A modified form of the proposal to use Roxburgh as the route to Central Otago resurfaced, proposing that the branch be extended to meet the Central Otago Railway in Alexandra, but this did not come to fruition.

The junction of the Roxburgh Branch with the Main South Line did not always remain in Clarksville. In 1907, an extension of 2.8 km was built alongside the Main South Line into Milton to provide for better operation, and until this extension was closed on 19 September 1960, Milton rather than Clarksville acted as the junction.

== Stations ==
The following stations were located on the Roxburgh Branch (in brackets is the distance from Clarksville):

- Glenore (5 km)
- Mount Stuart (8 km)
- Manuka (11 km)
- Round Hill (16 km)
- Johnstone (20 km)
- Waitahuna (24 km)
- Forsyth (29 km)
- Lawrence(35 km)
- Evans Flat (41 km)
- Bowlers Creek (44 km)
- Craigellachie (52 km)
- Beaumont (56 km)
- Craig Flat (68 km)
- Rigney (71 km)
- Minzion (76 km)
- Millers Flat (79 km)
- Teviot (88 km)
- Roxburgh (95 km)

Six of these stations possessed goods sheds and eight had cattle and sheep yards.

== Operation ==
Like many other branch lines in rural New Zealand, the line typically operated with one mixed train of passengers and freight each way per day. Roxburgh is located in an important stone fruit growing region, and during the appropriate season, special trains would run to carry the large quantities of fruit. The construction of the Roxburgh Dam in the 1950s also provided much traffic for the line. Many extra trains were run during this period but train sizes by today's standards remained constrained due to the steep grades and restrictive locomotive power able to be used on the branch.

Passengers were not plentiful and the line became freight-only from 4 September 1936. This was an attempt to improve the profitability of the line, but it did not work; from the opening of the final section to Roxburgh, the branch always made a working loss, with much traffic lost to road transport operators even before the line reached its greatest length. Steep grades and sharp curves that limited speeds further served to lessen rail's competitiveness.

In 1959–1960, the line carried 9,900 tonnes of freight out and 24,400 tonnes inwards, as well as 16,000 cattle and 51,800 sheep. Losses were increasing, and on 20 June 1961, it was announced that the line would be closed. Public outcry was severe enough that the line received a reprieve, and promises of extra traffic led to an increase in tonnage by 1965. This good news for the line's future did not last, however; by 1967, losses amounted to $100,000 a year and 1 April 1968 was announced as the date the line would close. Again, closure was deferred, but when a deal to export logs did not eventuate and fruit traffic shifted to road, the line's demise became inevitable and a final closure date was set for 1 June 1968.

== Motive power ==
The line was almost exclusively operated by steam locomotives. When the line was still the Lawrence Branch, W^{D} class tank locomotives were based in Lawrence in the early 20th century. When the line became the Roxburgh Branch, the predominant sources of motive power were tender locomotives of the A and A^{B} classes during this period.

Diesel locomotives were only authorised to operate on the Roxburgh Branch at the time of its closure, to haul trains involved with the dismantling of the line. DJ class engines were the main type of diesel locomotives used.

== Closure and demolition ==
With closure announced for 1 April 1968, a passenger excursion train, intended to be the last passenger train to Roxburgh, ran on 31 March 1968 and was hauled by A^{B} 795, now preserved on the Kingston Flyer. The Hon Peter Gordon, the Minister of Railways responsible for the final decision to close the branch, drove the train from Lawrence to Roxburgh under supervision on that day. This train turned out not to be the last as the line was granted a two-month reprieve until 31 May 1968 awaiting a final decision on how the export logs from the vicinity of the then Beaumont State forest were to be transported. The nearby Heriot to Edievale section of the Tapanui Branch, previously closed on 1 January 1968 had its removal also delayed in 1968 for the same reason. It was then decided that those logs would be transported by road, thus sealing the fate of both lines.

The last official trains from and to Roxburgh ran on Friday 31 May 1968. The goods train leaving Roxburgh bound for Milton at 10 am that morning included three attached passenger carriages. Earlier in the week the carriages had also been attached to a goods train from Millers Flat to Lawrence and back. The cars on the final train carried some 150 children and adults on an excursion organised by the Teviot Fruitgrowers Association. The carriages exchanged trains at Lawrence, where the up and down trains normally crossed. The speed of the trains carrying the passengers that day was limited to 15 miles per hour throughout the journey due to poor track conditions. On the return journey into Roxburgh that afternoon a flimsy wooden barricade constructed two miles north of Millers Flat, created by locals protesting the closure of the line, was knocked aside by the advancing train, which barely slowed, to the cheers of its passengers. That last official train steamed into Roxburgh at 4:50pm to the song "Now Is the Hour" being played, along with the Last Post and whistles from the engine bearing the words "Last Puffing Engine" on a headboard. The Minister of Railways, the Hon J.B. Gordon, was given three cheers in the Roxburgh station and, although not present, was presented anonymously with a large bag of chaff.

Trains continued to run during the first week of June 1968 after closure; one each ran to Lawrence, Beaumont and Roxburgh. The last actual goods train from Roxburgh was a cleanup train clearing the stations between Roxburgh and Craig Flat of wagons, as well as the three passenger cars from the official last train, which left Roxburgh hauled by an A^{B} steam locomotive on 6 June 1968. This was the last ever steam hauled train on the branch. On the same day an engine and van service hauled by a diesel locomotive of the D^{J} class locomotive ran from Dunedin to Beaumont; the D^{J} class had been granted running rights on the line that very week. On its return journey that day this diesel-hauled train cleared Beaumont yard and other points south to Lawrence where another train had previously cleared wagons and other equipment out. The DJ locomotive stalled on a steep grade near the Round Hill tunnel as a result of oak leaves falling on the line and the train's relatively large size for the lines steep grades. Sir Arthur Tindall, then judge of the Arbitration Court was travelling in the cab of the following train that day from Roxburgh hauled by the A^{B}. The train he was on came up behind the stalled D^{J} and its train, struck detonators placed on the line as a warning of the stalled train ahead, and then pushed the diesel locomotive and its train over the hill at Round Hill. Both trains then continued on their respective journeys to Milton.

Lifting of the Roxburgh Branch commenced on Friday 14 June 1968 with work trains hauled by D^{J} locomotives subsequently running all the way into Roxburgh. This was the first time D^{J} locomotives had operated to Roxburgh. By late June 1968 there was considerable removed material at Roxburgh yard ready for loading out by train. Hut accommodation for demolition workers, removal equipment such as bulldozers and a mobile crane on crawlers were transported to Roxburgh by a D^{J} hauled train on 2 July 1968. A temporary railway hut compound was established on the Roxburgh station platform for the accommodation of some of the demolition workers. Mains power to the Huts, which were individually wired for electricity, was sourced from the electric power lines at Roxburgh station yard. The idea was that these temporary huts were to be railed down to Millers Flat as the next demolition base just before the mainline rail track had been fully removed from Roxburgh. At the time there was some significant concern reported in the media (and up to Ministerial level) as to why these men had been not able to use the Roxburgh Railway houses, which by now were mostly empty, rather than the expense of establishing the temporary railway workers hut compound at Roxburgh. NZR stated this was impractical as the huts would be needed anyway as demolition progressed further down the line and so portable accommodation was optimum and in the long run cheaper than furnishing railway houses at Roxburgh for temporary demolition gangs that would be there a few short weeks. By 19 July 1968, the yard track, mainline track past the station platform and turntable at Roxburgh had been removed and cleared out. Men had been recruited from Winter Employment schemes and the mobile crane lifted complete track sets onto flat top wagons for transporting out. During demolition D^{SA} class shunting locomotives worked at the railhead shuttling empty and loaded wagons from and to the nearest exchange siding (the nearest intact station yard) on the branch whilst D^{J} locomotives periodically cleared out materials removed from that nearest railhead back down the branch to the Main South Line as removal progressed.

Track sets were railed to either of Manuka station further down the branch for temporary storage or to Kakapuaka station south of Balclutha on the Main South Line where further Winter Employment Scheme men were employed dismantling these removed track sets. By mid-November 1968 removal was approaching the 40-mile peg, about five miles north of Beaumont (in the Beaumont gorge between Craig Flat and Beaumont). Work then ceased due to a labour shortage as seasonal workers went back to work in local freezing works. A weed spray train ran as far as Beaumont on Monday 11 November 1968, which by then had its all train stop board at 34 miles 37 chains, between Craigellachie and Beaumont (the line from here to the end of rails near the 40 mile peg being worked as an extended Way and Works siding). Through the summer of 1969 the line was effectively still complete to the 40-mile peg, about five miles past Beaumont up the Beaumont Gorge. Further back up the line, by February 1969 it was reported that the Roxburgh station was derelict without a window left in place and the goods shed was being demolished. Millers Flat station at the time though was still well preserved, to be used as a temporary hotel for a while due to the towns official one burning down.

In April 1969 discussions were had with Pacific Scrap of Auckland with a view to them removing the then remaining 40 miles (64 kilometres) of the branch. Pacific Scrap officials did a velocipede trip up the line for scrap assessment in early May 1969 and a contract was subsequently let to them. Removal of the line recommenced on a six-day-a-week basis from mid-May 1969. The last work train had left Beaumont by early June 1969 hauled by a DD^{J} locomotive. By early July 1969 the rail line had been removed from under the State Highway 8 road overbridge, tunnel and SH8 level crossing of Big Hill. By late July 1969 removal of the line was nearing Lawrence with the last train ever leaving Lawrence by early August 1969. By mid-September 1969, Waitahuna too had seen its last train. By the end of October 1969, the last trains had moved through the Manuka Gorge and its tunnel, the Mount Stuart Tunnel. The final section into Clarksville was lifted on 24 November 1969. The mainline junction points and siding at Clarksville was finally removed on 29 July 1970 and so ended the Roxburgh Branch. Removal of some bridge structures further back up the line, for example, the Waitahuna bridge, continued past this date into 1970, until the local Inspector of Permanent Way was satisfied the line had been demolished to "Railways Department standards".

Subsequently, the Lands and Survey Department disposed of much of the rail corridor land to adjoining landowners through the early 1970s, although current title searches still reveal in nearly all cases the former route of the line to this day. For a while, in 1968/1969 there was a suggestion of using the old Big Hill rail tunnel, south of Beaumont, as a bypass over Big Hill for heavy trucks. The one-lane nature of the tunnel and its restrictive height meant that the high stock transporting trucks of the era would be unable to use it so effectively the idea foundered and the tunnel was never used again. However, as described below there is hope that this tunnel may see use again – at least as part of a proposed rail trail. Other parts of the line though were investigated for use also by the Ministry Of Works, the National Road Board and the Tuapeka County Council. This included potentially a suggestion of re-diverting SH8 up the east side of the Clutha River to Millers Flat, general road easements/realignments at old level crossings and the installation of crawler lanes for heavy truck vehicles. Some of these came to fruition but it was not until 2000 that the old formation up the Beaumont Gorge was turned into a minor public road, the Millennium track, which may form part of a future rail trail on the Roxburgh Branch.

== Today ==
Although remnants of closed railway lines deteriorate and disappear over time, a number of relics from the Roxburgh Branch still exist. The line's formation can often be seen winding through the countryside and the Mount Stuart Tunnel (also known as the Manuka Creek Tunnel) is still in place and is now a Department of Conservation public walkway of the SH8 road at the western approach to the Manuka Gorge. Round Hill tunnel, which passes directly under the SH8 road at Round Hill, is still in place but the approaches to it are heavily overgrown from both sides. The Big Hill tunnel remains also but is more easily visible from the western portal as the eastern portal is partially obscured by a landslip that fell down from below the SH8 road. In a paddock near a road, Waitahuna retains its goods shed (now a cafe), station building (now a museum), and even an open-roofed men's toilet. Unfortunately, some other station buildings have not been so lucky; Forsyth's passenger shelter collapsed in 1990, while Lawrence's station was burnt to the ground in a 1981 fire brigade practise. In Rigney, an old boxcar remains at the site of the former yard, with another boxcar located a couple of kilometres from Teviot, while just out of Beaumont, the original rail bridge over the Beaumont River has been in public use since the year 2000.

Most of the route between Beaumont and to a point near Millers Flat (Minzion) has been made into a public rail trail/track and can now be driven, cycled or walked over. This track is known as the Millennium track and a panel explaining the significance of the rail trail route and other interesting facts is at the site of the old Beaumont railway station at Beaumont just before the SH8 bridge crossing the Clutha river. Several of the old railway bridges alongside the eastern bank of the Clutha River were left in place after the line was lifted through the area in October/November 1968 and later in May 1969 after the Railways Department agreed not to remove the bridges with the then Tuapeka County Council. The trail track through the Beaumont gorge diverts briefly from the old rail corridor to pass over a hill at point known as the Lonely Graves where "Somebody's Darling" lies buried. This burial site was highlighted in Billy Connolly's World Tour of NZ filmed in 2004. The old railway at this point goes around a bluff alongside the Clutha river known as Horseshoe Bend. Past this point heading up to Millers Flat the Millennium trail forms part of the old rail line again until it joins up with up the old Millers Flat - Craig Flat road nearer to the old Minzion station site.

Stockyards remain at the sites of Mount Stuart, Beaumont, Evans Flat, and Millers Flat stations, with the latter two also still in possession of their platforms. Loading banks can be found in Manuka, Evans Flat, Bowlers Creek, and Craigellachie, and a now preserved goods shed is in Teviot (With a Historic Places Trust plaque explaining its significance to the district). A number of relics remain in Roxburgh from its days as a railway terminus; these include a water tank for steam locomotives, the station building converted for farm use, loading banks, a turntable pit, the old rail cement discharge silos at the southern end of the yard (used when cement was transported by rail for the Roxburgh dam construction), and even the concrete stop block that signified the end of the branch.

A proposal has been made to convert most of the branch's former route into a rail trail much like the Otago Central Rail Trail that follows the route of the former Otago Central Railway. Although progress on the proposal has been made, only part of it through the Beaumont Gorge (as described above) and the Mount Stuart Tunnel section has yet to come to fruition.
