= Waitahuna =

- Hamlet
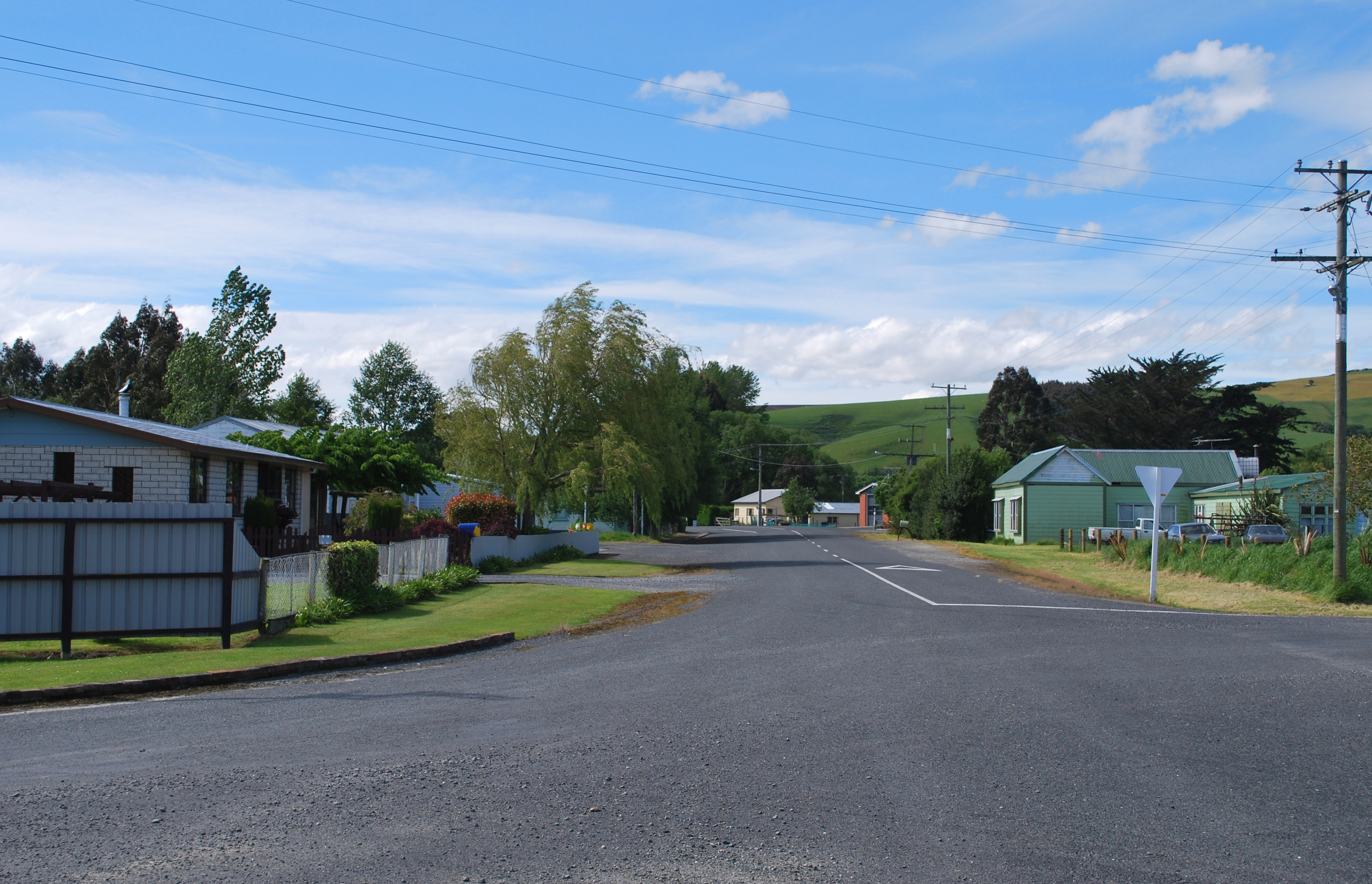
- Boyldon Street, Waitahuna

- Location within New Zealand
- Coordinates: 45°59′10″S 169°45′25″E
- Country: New Zealand
- Region: Otago
- Territorial authority: Clutha District
- Time zone: UTC+12 (New Zealand Standard Time)
  - Summer (DST): UTC+13 (New Zealand Daylight Time)
- Postcode: 9532
- Area code: 03
- Local iwi: Ngāi Tahu

Waitahuna is a small rural hamlet in the Otago region of New Zealand's South Island. It is 10 kilometres (6.2 mi) from Lawrence.

The settlement was originally called Havelock, but the name did not survive. In the 19th century, the town thrived after the discovery of gold. The Waitahuna Gully Miner's Monument commemorates this discovery and the miners who lived in the area. Another notable man-made feature is the Waitāhuna River Suspension Bridge, built around 1905 or 1906.

The town was briefly a railway terminus, when a branch line from a junction in Clarksville with the Main South Line was opened to the town on 22 January 1877. A little over two months later, the line was opened beyond Waitahuna to Lawrence and it went on to become the Roxburgh Branch. Passenger trains served Waitahuna until 4 September 1936; from that date until the line's closure on 1 June 1968, the line was freight-only. Despite the line's closure, Waitahuna's goods shed and station building still stand at the site of the former railway yard, and are being restored by their owners.

== Education ==
Waitahuna School is a co-educational state primary school for Year 1 to 6 students, with a roll of 6 as of July 2026.

== Notable people ==
- Albert James Ryan (1884–1955), New Zealand commercial traveller, newspaper publisher, Irish nationalist and land agent
