= Albert James Ryan =

New Zealand newspaper publisher (1884–1955)

Albert James Ryan (1884–1955) was a New Zealand commercial traveller, newspaper publisher, Irish nationalist and land agent. He was born in Waitahuna, South Otago, New Zealand in 1884.
