= Roxburgh, New Zealand =

Town in Otago, New Zealand

Roxburgh
- Town
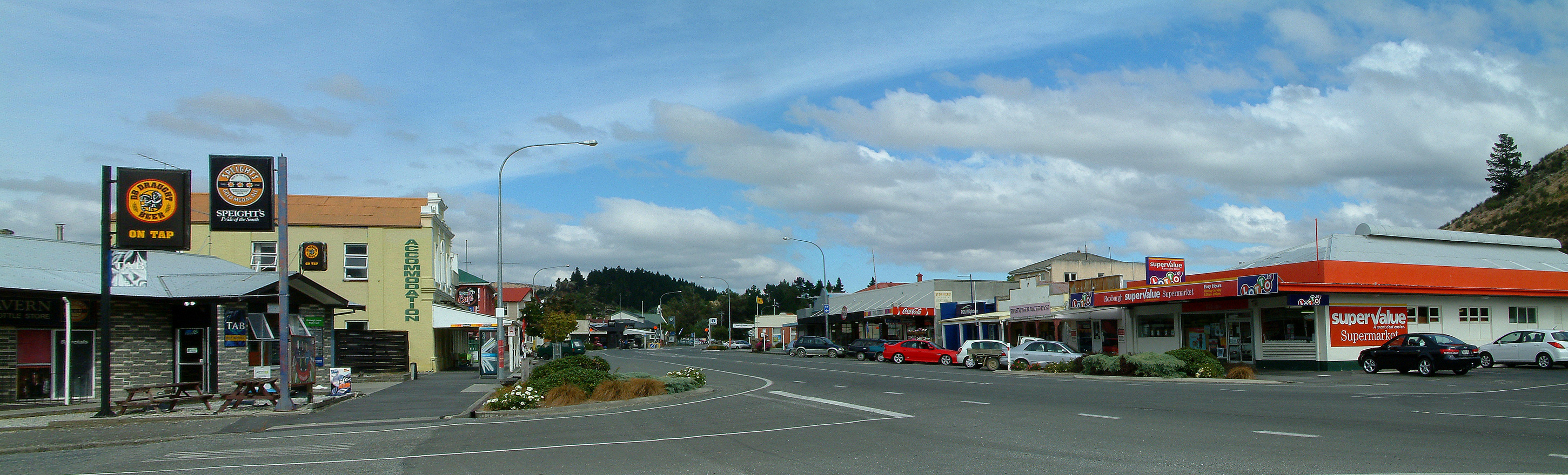
- Scotland Street, the high street of Roxburgh, along State Highway 8
- Interactive map of Roxburgh
- Coordinates: 45°32′S 169°19′E
- Country: New Zealand
- Region: Otago region
- Territorial authorities: Central Otago District
- Ward: Teviot Valley Ward
- Community: Teviot Valley Community
- Electorates: Southland; Te Tai Tonga (Māori)

Government
  - Territorial authority: Central Otago District Council
  - Regional council: Otago Regional Council
  - Mayor of Central Otago: Tamah Alley
  - Southland MP: Joseph Mooney
  - Te Tai Tonga MP: Tākuta Ferris

Area
  - Urban area: 2.34 km^{2} (0.90 sq mi)

Population (June 2025)
  - Urban area: 640
  - Density: 270/km^{2} (710/sq mi)
- Time zone: UTC+12 (NZST)
  - Summer (DST): UTC+13 (NZDT)
- Postcode: 9500
- Area code: 03
- Local iwi: Ngāi Tahu

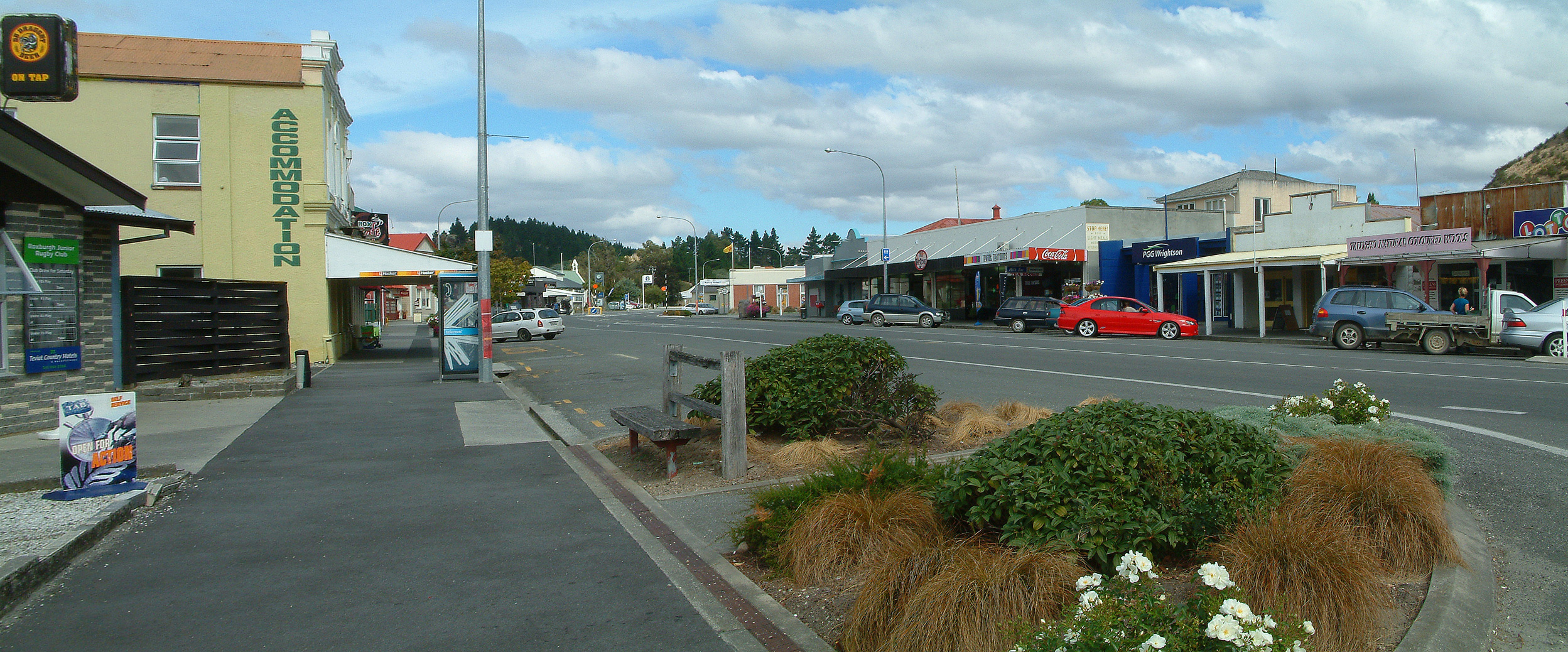
Scotland Street

Roxburgh (previously called Teviot and Teviot Junction) is a small New Zealand town of about 600 people in Central Otago. It is in Teviot Valley on the banks of the Clutha River, 40 kilometres (25 mi) south of Alexandra in the South Island. State Highway 8, which links Central Otago with Dunedin city, passes through the town. Roxburgh is well known for its Summer fruit and "Jimmy's Pies."

An important centre during the Otago gold rush of the 1860s, in more recent times Roxburgh has relied on a mixture of livestock and stone fruit production for its economic survival. It is one of the country's most important apple growing regions and other stone fruit such as cherries and apricots are also harvested locally.

Five kilometres to the north of the town is the Roxburgh Dam, the earliest of the major hydroelectric dams built on the Clutha. There is also an opencast lignite mine located just north of town at Coal Creek.

== History ==
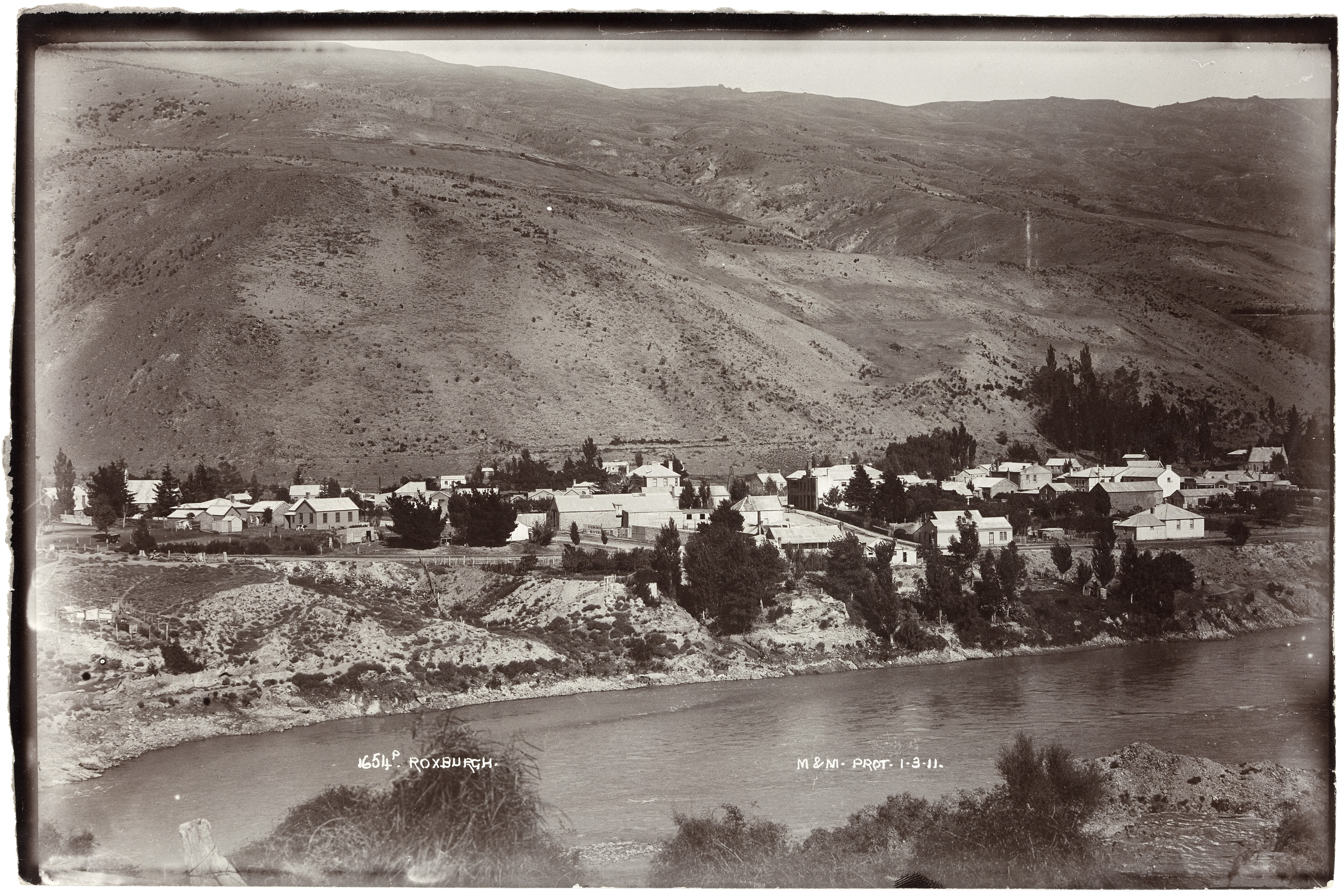
Roxburgh in 1911

The town was called Teviot, and from 1863 to 1866 Teviot Junction, but this name is instead now used for places such as the Teviot Valley and the Teviot River. The name Roxburgh was adopted on 18 April 1877. The name of the town comes from Roxburghshire in Scotland and was after the first European settlers arrived in the area.

From 1928 until 1968, Roxburgh was served by the Roxburgh Branch, a branch line railway that ran to the town from the Main South Line. The railway never actually reached the town itself as the terminus was located about 2 km south of Roxburgh at the small settlement known as Hercules Flat. For the entire period the line served Roxburgh, it made a working loss, but it helped to promote economic development in the town and was an important means of supplying materials for the Roxburgh Dam. Today, relics of the town's former status as a railway terminus still exist, including a turntable pit, a water tower for steam locomotives, and the station building has been converted into a hayshed and workshop. Most of the houses which once housed railway workers (also known as "Railway Houses") still stand and are now in private ownership.

The Roxburgh War Memorial was unveiled on 24 May 1923. It is a square obelisk and lists the names of the 42 men from the town and local region who died in both World War One and Two. When unveiled it included mounted on a plinth, a German Rheinmetall 17 cm mittlerer Minenwerfer and a Maxim MG 08 Heavy Machine gun which was mounted on a tripod. The Mortar was captured by the 12th Company (Nelson ) 2nd Canterbury Infantry Battalion on 2 August 1918, and returned to New Zealand as a war trophy. The Maxim Gun was stolen some time during the 1970s and the mortar was relocated on 16 March 2003 when a new Memorial Plaque was placed outside the Council Building & Returned Services Association club-rooms.

Town scenes from the 2004 film In My Father's Den were filmed in Roxburgh.

== Demographics ==
Roxburgh is described by Statistics New Zealand as a rural settlement. It covers 2.34 km^{2} (0.90 sq mi) and had an estimated population of 640 as of June 2025, with a population density of 274 people per km^{2}. It is part of the much larger Teviot Valley statistical area.

Historical population for Roxburgh
Year	Pop.	±% p.a.
2006	606	—
2013	528	−1.95%
2018	588	+2.18%

Before the 2023 census, Roxburgh had a smaller boundary, covering 2.06 km^{2} (0.80 sq mi). Using that boundary, Roxburgh had a population of 588 at the 2018 New Zealand census, an increase of 60 people (11.4%) since the 2013 census, and a decrease of 18 people (−3.0%) since the 2006 census. There were 279 households, comprising 267 males and 324 females, giving a sex ratio of 0.82 males per female, with 84 people (14.3%) aged under 15 years, 60 (10.2%) aged 15 to 29, 255 (43.4%) aged 30 to 64, and 189 (32.1%) aged 65 or older.

Ethnicities were 86.7% European/Pākehā, 14.8% Māori, 5.6% Pasifika, 4.6% Asian, and 1.5% other ethnicities. People may identify with more than one ethnicity.

Although some people chose not to answer the census's question about religious affiliation, 44.9% had no religion, 44.4% were Christian, 0.5% were Muslim, 0.5% were Buddhist and 1.5% had other religions.

Of those at least 15 years old, 63 (12.5%) people had a bachelor's or higher degree, and 150 (29.8%) people had no formal qualifications. 30 people (6.0%) earned over $70,000 compared to 17.2% nationally. The employment status of those at least 15 was that 222 (44.0%) people were employed full-time, 69 (13.7%) were part-time, and 3 (0.6%) were unemployed.

=== Teviot Valley ===
Teviot Valley statistical area covers 1,302.44 km^{2} (502.87 sq mi) and also includes Lake Roxburgh village, Millers Flat and Ettrick. It had an estimated population of 1,770 as of June 2025, with a population density of 1.4 people per km^{2}.

Historical population for Teviot Valley
Year	Pop.	±% p.a.
2006	1,683	—
2013	1,563	−1.05%
2018	1,779	+2.62%

Teviot Valley had a population of 1,779 at the 2018 New Zealand census, an increase of 216 people (13.8%) since the 2013 census, and an increase of 96 people (5.7%) since the 2006 census. There were 750 households, comprising 930 males and 849 females, giving a sex ratio of 1.1 males per female. The median age was 50.0 years (compared with 37.4 years nationally), with 249 people (14.0%) aged under 15 years, 240 (13.5%) aged 15 to 29, 840 (47.2%) aged 30 to 64, and 447 (25.1%) aged 65 or older.

Ethnicities were 87.0% European/Pākehā, 9.9% Māori, 8.3% Pasifika, 2.2% Asian, and 1.5% other ethnicities. People may identify with more than one ethnicity.

The percentage of people born overseas was 17.0, compared with 27.1% nationally.

Although some people chose not to answer the census's question about religious affiliation, 48.1% had no religion, 42.2% were Christian, 0.2% had Māori religious beliefs, 0.3% were Hindu, 0.2% were Muslim, 0.3% were Buddhist and 1.2% had other religions.

Of those at least 15 years old, 165 (10.8%) people had a bachelor's or higher degree, and 399 (26.1%) people had no formal qualifications. The median income was $25,800, compared with $31,800 nationally. 132 people (8.6%) earned over $70,000 compared to 17.2% nationally. The employment status of those at least 15 was that 816 (53.3%) people were employed full-time, 231 (15.1%) were part-time, and 15 (1.0%) were unemployed.

== Entertainment ==
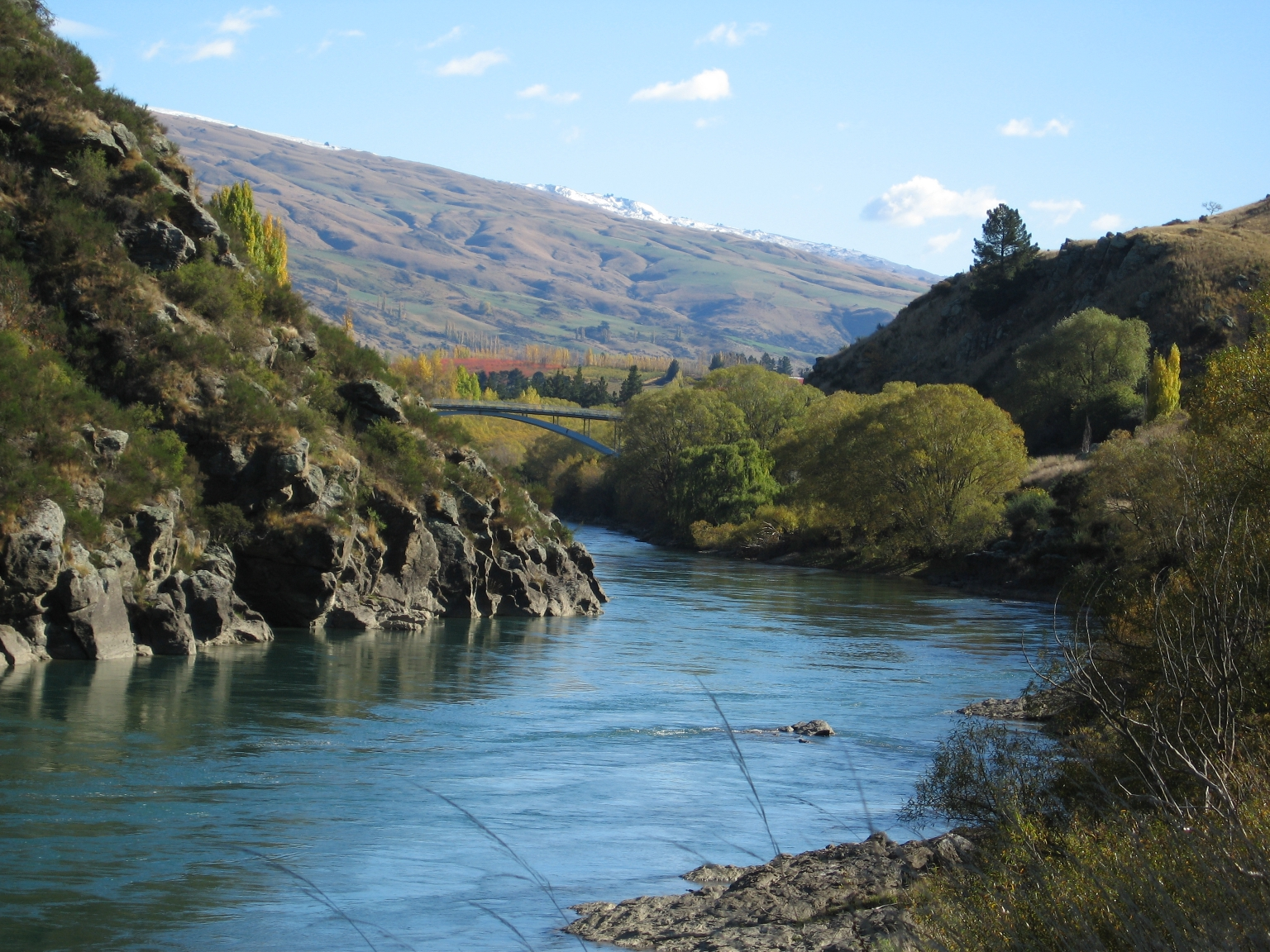
View of the Clutha River towards Roxburgh Bridge.

"The dance hall was beautiful...called the Athenaeum Hall. In 1930 when they built the town hall, they towed the Athenaeum to the back" - Douglas Dance, 84 (February 2025)

Roxburgh Atheneum Hall, built in 1893, on Scotland Street, was shifted and redeveloped as part of Roxburgh Town Hall in 1930, its auditorium was the Roxburgh Cinema, New Zealand's oldest. The cinema seated 258 persons and was one of only four cinemas left in Central Otago. Live shows were also performed occasionally. The cinema was destroyed by fire on Waitangi Day 2025, the second fire that year.

== Media ==
Mount Benger Mail was published in Roxburgh, from 1880 and ceased with November 26, 1941.

== Education ==
Roxburgh Area School is a co-educational state area school for Year 1 to 13 students, with a roll of 118 as of July 2026.

Education in the Roxburgh area started in 1865. At Coal Creek Flat north of Roxburgh, a school was mentioned in 1877, another operated from 1884 to 1930, and a third opened in 1950 Roxburgh Hydro school flourished from the 1950s to the 1970s. Roxburgh District High School operated from 1926, and was renamed to Roxburgh Area School in 1976.

== Climate ==
Climate data for Roxburgh Power Station (1981–2010)
Month	Jan	Feb	Mar	Apr	May	Jun	Jul	Aug	Sep	Oct	Nov	Dec	Year
Mean daily maximum °C (°F)	23.2 (73.8)	22.9 (73.2)	20.5 (68.9)	17.3 (63.1)	12.8 (55.0)	9.5 (49.1)	8.7 (47.7)	11.9 (53.4)	14.9 (58.8)	17.4 (63.3)	19.6 (67.3)	21.2 (70.2)	16.7 (62.0)
Daily mean °C (°F)	16.6 (61.9)	16.1 (61.0)	14.0 (57.2)	11.0 (51.8)	8.0 (46.4)	5.3 (41.5)	4.6 (40.3)	6.6 (43.9)	9.1 (48.4)	11.2 (52.2)	13.0 (55.4)	15.0 (59.0)	10.9 (51.6)
Mean daily minimum °C (°F)	9.9 (49.8)	9.2 (48.6)	7.4 (45.3)	4.8 (40.6)	3.1 (37.6)	1.2 (34.2)	0.3 (32.5)	1.3 (34.3)	3.3 (37.9)	5.0 (41.0)	6.5 (43.7)	8.9 (48.0)	5.1 (41.1)
Average rainfall mm (inches)	42.4 (1.67)	33.3 (1.31)	52.7 (2.07)	35.7 (1.41)	47.9 (1.89)	32.1 (1.26)	35.7 (1.41)	26.4 (1.04)	33.5 (1.32)	46.7 (1.84)	36.7 (1.44)	57.5 (2.26)	480.6 (18.92)
Source: NIWA (rainfall 1971–2000)
