= Herbert Deveril =

Photographer (b. 1840 d. 1911)

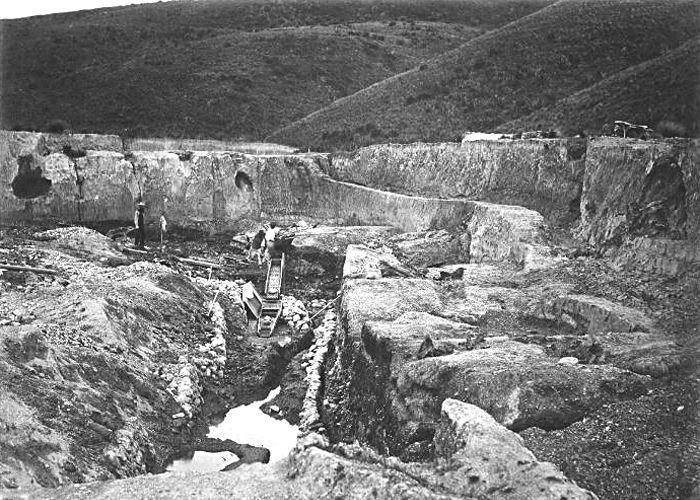
Gold rush era image of Gabriel's Gully, circa 1875

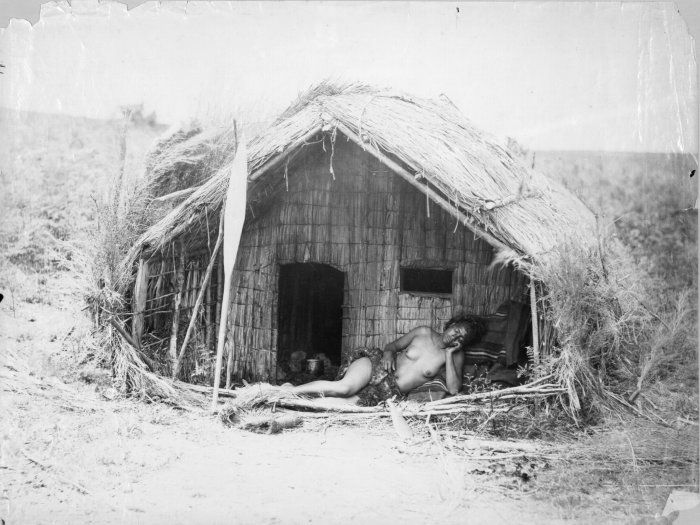
Māori woman on the porch of a whare, 1875

Albert Edwin Ekins (9 May 1840 – 24 August 1911), known as Herbert Deveril, was a photographer in Australia and New Zealand.

Ekins was born on 9 May 1840 in Ware, Hertfordshire, England, the son of George and Elizabeth. He studied photolithography in Southampton before preparing for the priesthood in Belgium. He left the church, changed his name to Herbert Deveril, and in 1864 emigrated to Australia.

He worked in a number of photographic studios and as a government photographer in Melbourne, before moving to New Zealand in March 1873 where he worked as a government photographer.

He took photographs of sights in New Zealand for the Philadelphia Centennial Exhibition, the first official World's Fair in 1876. His work included photos of Māori, Wairoa Bridge, Rotomahana hot springs, Hot Lake district and Tauranga.

Deveril lived in Auckland until 1891, moving to South Africa, where he invested in ostrich farming. He later returned to Australia, and in 1901 moved to North Queensland. Deveril died 24 August 1911 in Townsville and is buried in the town's Belgian cemetery.

The Hocken Library at the University of Otago has held exhibitions of his work. Auckland Art Gallery Toi o Tāmaki holds a number of his photographs.
