= Millers Flat =

Town in the South Island of New Zealand

- Rural settlement
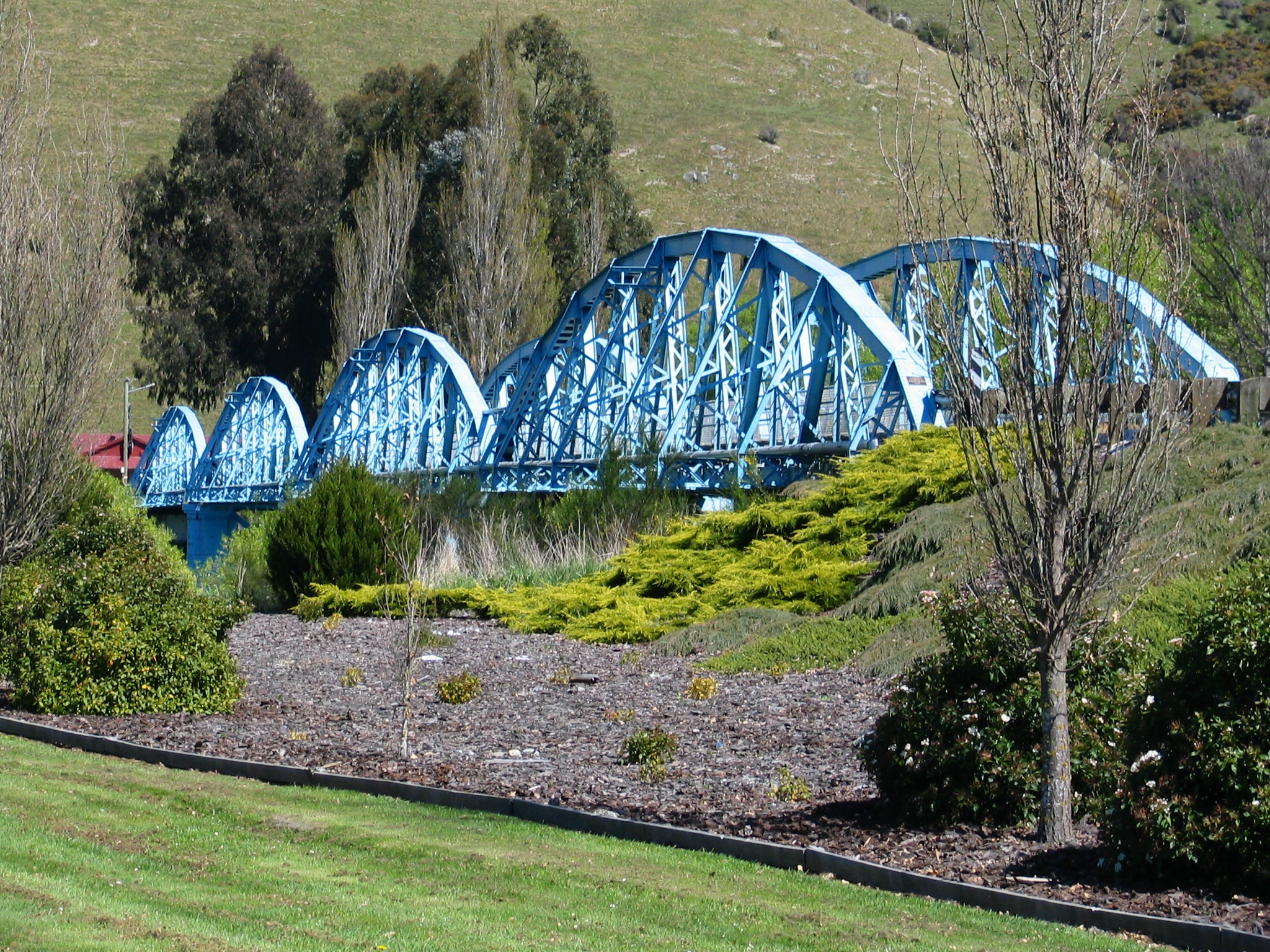
- The heritage-listed Millers Flat Bridge, a four span steel truss bridge which crosses the Clutha River
- Interactive map of Millers Flat
- Coordinates: 45°40′S 169°25′E
- Country: New Zealand
- Region: Otago region
- Territorial authorities: Central Otago District
- Ward: Teviot Valley Ward
- Community: Teviot Valley Community
- Electorates: Southland; Te Tai Tonga (Māori)

Government
  - Territorial authority: Central Otago District Council
  - Regional council: Otago Regional Council
  - Mayor of Central Otago: Tamah Alley
  - Southland MP: Joseph Mooney
  - Te Tai Tonga MP: Tākuta Ferris

Area
  - Urban area: 0.99 km^{2} (0.38 sq mi)

Population (June 2025)
  - Urban area: 90
  - Density: 91/km^{2} (240/sq mi)
- Time zone: UTC+12 (NZST)
  - Summer (DST): UTC+13 (NZDT)
- Postcode: 9572
- Area code: 03
- Local iwi: Ngāi Tahu

Millers Flat is a small town in inland Otago, in the South Island of New Zealand. It is located on the Clutha River, 17 kilometres south of Roxburgh. Fruit growing is the main industry in the area. Most of the town lies on the north bank of the Clutha; the main road, State Highway 8, passes close by on the river's other bank. The Roxburgh Branch railway used to pass through the town; it was opened to Millers Flat in 1925 and was the terminus for approximately two and a half years, until the section to Roxburgh was opened. The line was closed in 1968, though the town's station platform and some of the railway formation still exist.

Millers Flat was originally called Ovens Hill; its current name is in honour of an early European settler, Walter Miller, who farmed in the area from about 1849.

Millers Flat Bridge was designed by Robert Hay (1847–1928) and construction started in 1897. It was opened in 1899.

== Demographics ==
Millers Flat is described by Statistics New Zealand as a rural settlement. It covers 0.99 km^{2} (0.38 sq mi) and had an estimated population of 90 as of June 2025, with a population density of 91 people per km^{2}. It is part of the much larger Teviot Valley statistical area.

Historical population
Year	Pop.	±% p.a.
2006	99	—
2013	90	−1.35%
2018	87	−0.68%

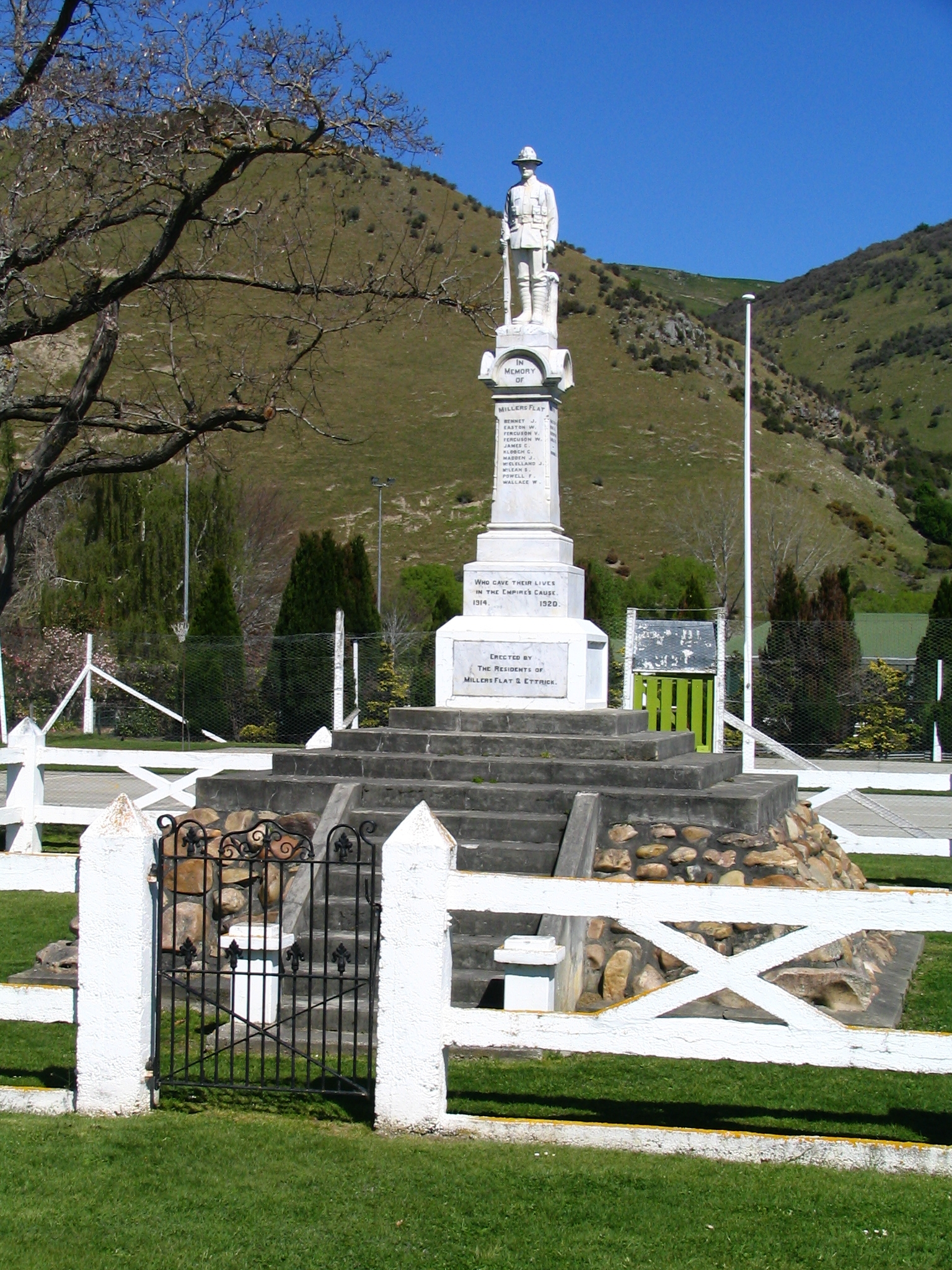
Millers Flat war memorial

Millers Flat had a population of 87 at the 2018 New Zealand census, a decrease of 3 people (−3.3%) since the 2013 census, and a decrease of 12 people (−12.1%) since the 2006 census. There were 42 households, comprising 39 males and 48 females, giving a sex ratio of 0.81 males per female. The median age was 61.2 years (compared with 37.4 years nationally), with 6 people (6.9%) aged under 15 years, 9 (10.3%) aged 15 to 29, 36 (41.4%) aged 30 to 64, and 36 (41.4%) aged 65 or older.

Ethnicities were 96.6% European/Pākehā, and 6.9% Māori. People may identify with more than one ethnicity.

Although some people chose not to answer the census's question about religious affiliation, 48.3% had no religion, and 41.4% were Christian.

Of those at least 15 years old, 9 (11.1%) people had a bachelor's or higher degree, and 30 (37.0%) people had no formal qualifications. The median income was $26,300, compared with $31,800 nationally. 12 people (14.8%) earned over $70,000 compared to 17.2% nationally. The employment status of those at least 15 was that 36 (44.4%) people were employed full-time, 9 (11.1%) were part-time, and 3 (3.7%) were unemployed.

== Grave of Somebody's Darling ==
Approximately 8 km downstream of Millers Flat on the Clutha River are the remains of the Horseshoe Bend Gold Diggings, now largely remembered for the story of "Somebody's Darling" and the Lonely Graves.

Early in 1865 the body of a young man was discovered at Rag Beach, upstream and on the opposite side of the river from the present site of the Lonely Graves. An inquest held on 22 February 1865 in the Horseshoe Hotel determined the body to be that of Charles Alms who had fallen in the river at Mutton Town Creek, some considerable distance upstream. Alms, a butcher from the Nevis had been swimming cattle across the river when he had been thrown from his horse and washed away. The body was buried in an unmarked grave and the gravesite remained untended. Later in that same year a miner named William Rigney arrived at Horseshoe Bend, and with John Ord erected a fence of rough manuka poles around the previously untended grave. Rigney obtained a piece of black pine and made a simple headstone for the grave. With a four-inch nail he inscribed the words "Somebody's Darling lies buried here." In 1903 a marble headstone was erected. William Rigney died in 1912 and was buried beside "Somebody's Darling."

== Education ==
Millers Flat School is a co-educational state primary school for Year 1 to 8 students, with a roll of 23 as of July 2026.
