= Clarksville, New Zealand =

Clarksville
- Hamlet
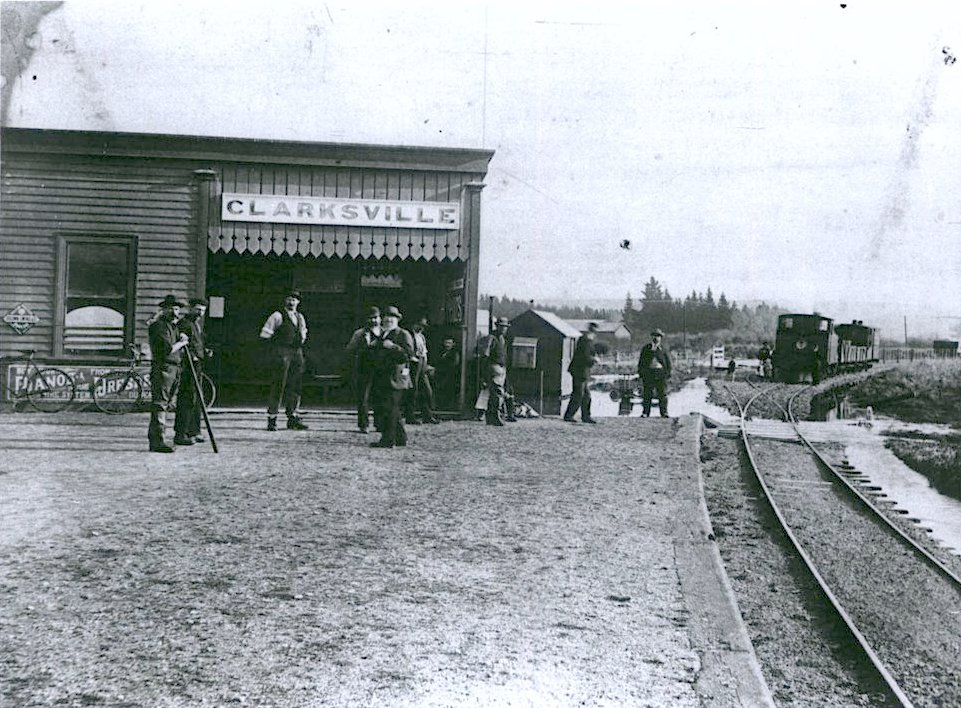
- Clarksville Junction before 1907
- Interactive map of Clarksville
- Coordinates: 46°08′S 169°55′E
- Country: New Zealand
- Region: Otago
- Territorial authority: Clutha District
- Electorate: Taieri
- Elevation: 15 m (49 ft)

Population
  - Total: 174
- Time zone: UTC+12 (NZST)
  - Summer (DST): UTC+13 (NZDT)
- Postcode: 9292
- Area code: 03
- Local iwi: Ngāi Tahu

Clarksville (also known as Clarksville Junction) is a small township located three kilometres southwest of Milton in the Otago region of the South Island of New Zealand. State Highways 1 and 8 meet in Clarksville. The town was also once the location of a railway junction, where the Roxburgh Branch left the Main South Line. Construction of this branch line began in the 1870s, and Clarksville acted as the junction until 1907 when an extension of the branch was built alongside the Main South Line into Milton to improve operations. This led to Milton being the junction until 1960, when the extension was removed, and Clarksville regained its status as a junction until the branch was entirely closed in 1968.

The station opened on 22 January 1878 and closed on 24 May 1970. In 1898, there was a 5th class station, passenger platform, cart approach to the platform, stationmaster's house and, urinals. In 1936, it was proposed that the ladies' toilets be removed, and in 1968, the shelter shed, loading bank and, men's toilets were also removed. The station building was sold for $50 in 1970.

The settlement was originally named Clarkesville, the first "e" being officially dropped in 1896. It was named after early settler Henry Clark.
