= Waitāhuna River =

Coordinates: 46°09′S 169°35′E

Location
- Country: New Zealand

The Waitāhuna River, known until 2019 as Waitahuna River, is a river in the Clutha District of New Zealand, a tributary of the Clutha River.

== See also ==
- List of rivers of New Zealand
