= Tokomairaro River =

River in Otago, New Zealand

Coordinates: 46°12′S 170°03′E

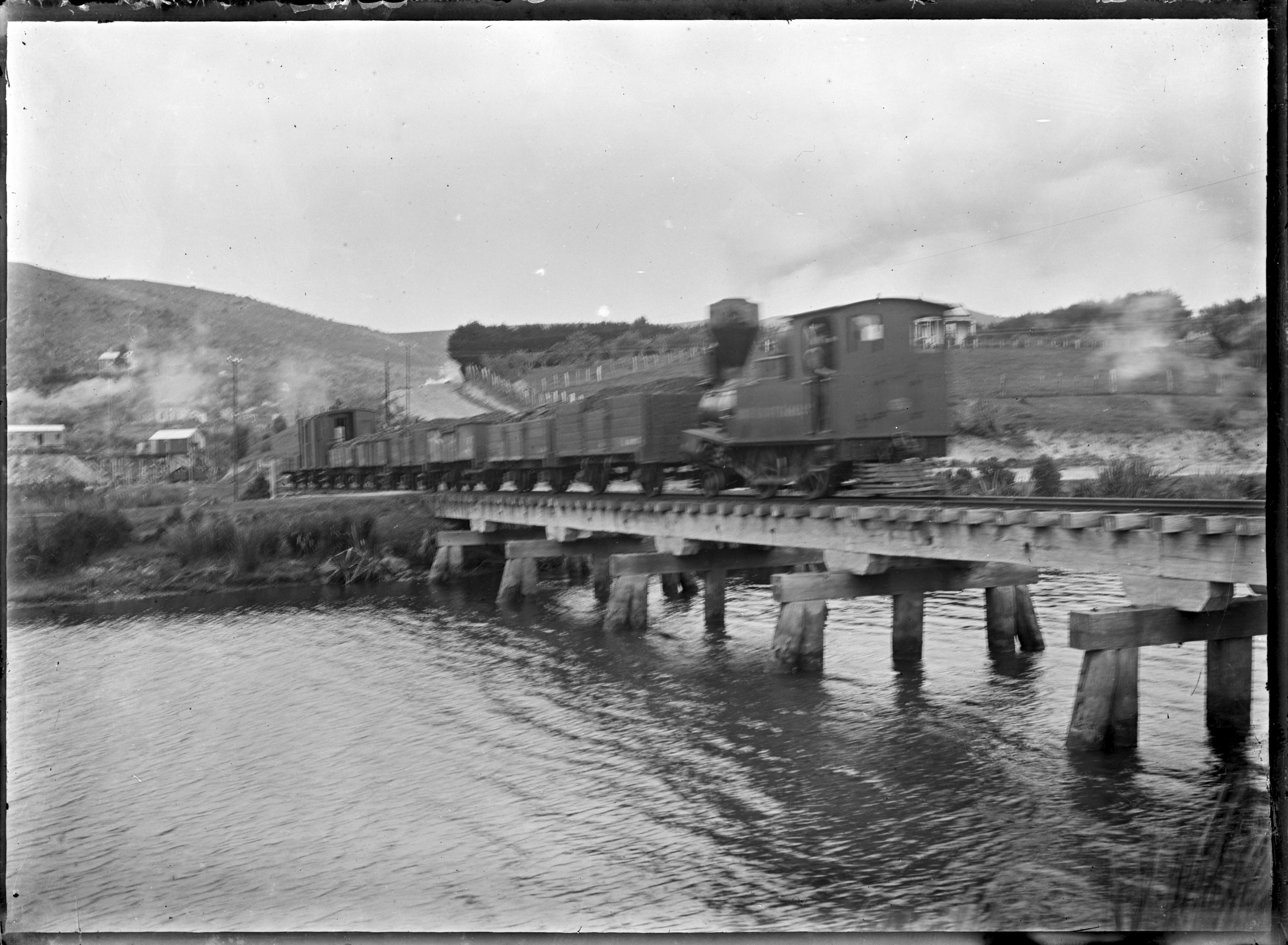
Train crossing a railway bridge over the Tokomairaro River at Waronui, Clutha District, c. 1926

The Tokomairaro River is located in Otago, New Zealand. It flows southeast for some 50 kilometres (30 mi), reaching the Pacific Ocean at Toko Mouth 50 kilometres (30 mi) south of Dunedin. The town of Milton is located on the Tokomairaro's floodplain, close to the junction of its two main branches (which run past the north and south ends of the town).

The name of the river is Māori, and translates roughly as 'place where canoe must be poled' (a possible reference to the method needed to travel through the extensive wetlands, instead of the usual paddling). The Tokomairaro River is prone to seasonal flooding during the heavy rainfall months, August to October. Local industrial buildings have been forced to build high concrete walls around their property to reduce flood damage each year.

The spelling of the river changed from "Tokomairiro River" to "Tokomairaro River" on 28 July 2016. Both spellings have been in use since mid-1800s, however "Tokomairaro" was deemed to be correct. Milton's main school, which is named for the river, retains the former spelling.
