= Milton, New Zealand =

Town in New Zealand

Milton
- Town
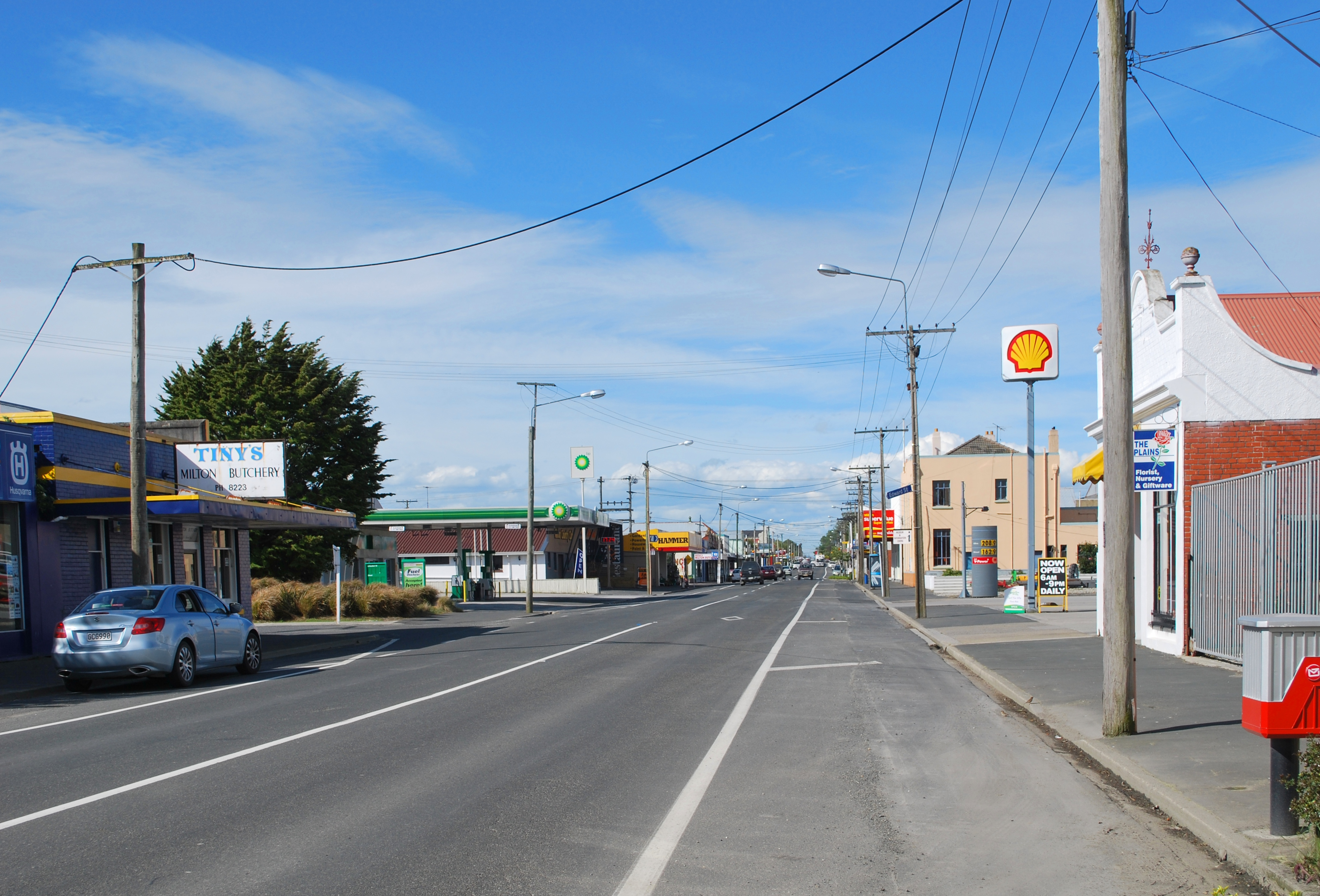
- Milton Union Street in 2012
- Interactive map of Milton
- Coordinates: 46°07′S 169°58′E
- Country: New Zealand
- Region: Otago
- Territorial authority: Clutha District
- Ward: Bruce
- Electorates: Taieri; Te Tai Tonga (Māori)

Government
  - Territorial authority: Clutha District Council
  - Regional council: Otago Regional Council
  - Mayor of Clutha: Jock Martin
  - Taieri MP: Ingrid Leary
  - Te Tai Tonga MP: Tākuta Ferris

Area
  - Total: 4.16 km^{2} (1.61 sq mi)

Population (June 2025)
  - Total: 2,120
  - Density: 510/km^{2} (1,320/sq mi)
- Time zone: UTC+12 (NZST)
  - Summer (DST): UTC+13 (NZDT)
- Postcode: 9220
- Area code: 03
- Local iwi: Ngāi Tahu

Milton, formerly known as Tokomairiro or Tokomairaro, is a town of over 2,000 people, located on State Highway 1, 50 kilometres to the south of Dunedin in Otago, New Zealand. It lies on the floodplain of the Tokomairaro River (until 2016 called the Tokomairiro), one branch of which loops past the north and south ends of the town. This river gives its name to many local features, notably the town's only secondary school, Tokomairiro High School.

Founded as a milling town in the 1850s, there has long been dispute as to the naming of the settlement. The town's streets are named for prominent British poets, and it is possible that the town's original intended name of Milltown became shortened by association with the poet of the same name. It is equally possible, however, that the name Milton inspired the choice of poets' names for the streets.

== History ==
Milton's early history was strongly affected by the discovery of gold by Gabriel Read at Gabriel's Gully close to the nearby township of Lawrence. As Milton stood close to one of the most easily accessible routes to the interior, it grew greatly during the goldrush years of the 1860s and was a major staging post for prospectors heading for the goldfields.

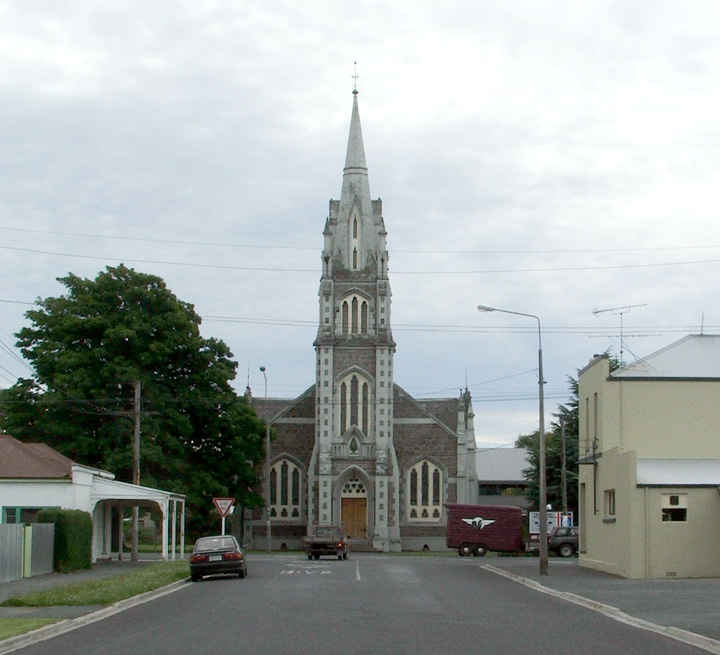
Lawson's church dominates the old road to Fairfax (Tokoiti).

The town was originally established at Fairfax (now Tokoiti), a settlement nestling at the foot of the hills which lie to the southeast of the town. As communication with the goldfields in the interior became more important, and the desirability of the town becoming a staging post increased, it spread down onto the plains around the river. A Gothic church, Tokomairiro Presbyterian Church, was built at this time by the architect R.A Lawson. At the time of its construction, this church was the tallest building at such a southern latitude in the world.

The church is still the town's most obvious landmark, and is visible across the Tokomairiro Plains from several kilometres away. It was located as a terminating vista at the end of the main road connecting Fairfax with the main route south from Dunedin to the goldfields, and as such is an imposing structure dominating this road. Milton was an important town in early Otago – much more so than it is today – mainly due to its location on the route to the goldfields, and also for the Bruce Woollen Mills, which were among the province's largest factories. Other prominent industries included the Kiwi Bacon Factory, which had a branch in Milton until the early 1980s.

The town's importance in communication in the early years of New Zealand settlement is emphasised by it being one of the two centres first linked by long-distance telephony, with a pioneering line set up between Milton and Dunedin in February 1878. It was not until the early twentieth century that it was superseded in size by the now considerably larger local town of Balclutha. The town was also important in education in early Otago – the Tokomairiro School – now split into Tokoiti School (still on the site of the original school) and Tokomairiro High School – was founded in 1856, only eight years after the founding of the province itself, and was one of the province's leading schools for many years thereafter. Electric lighting was installed in 1919.

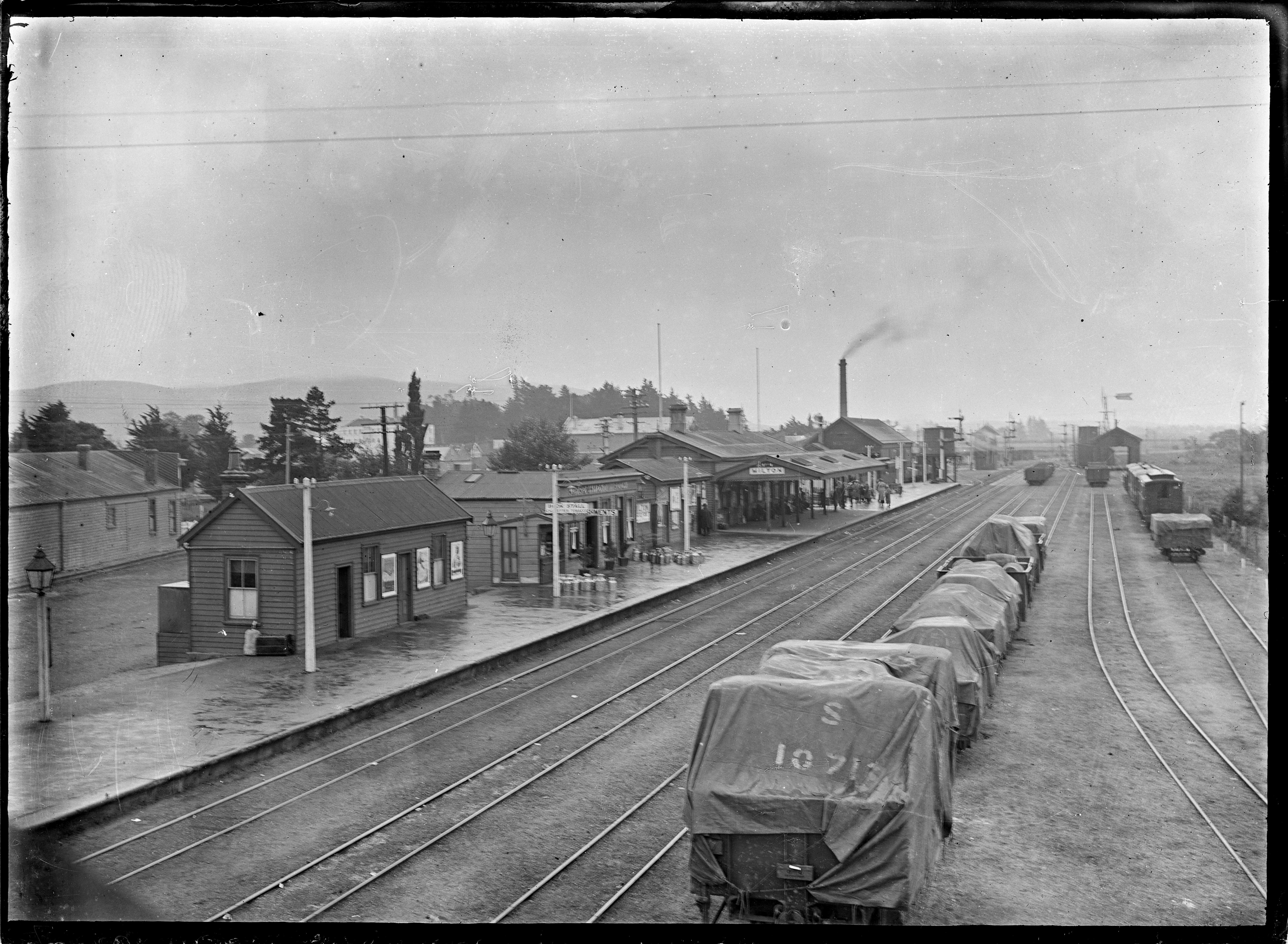
Milton railway station in 1926

=== Railway ===
Milton was connected to the national railway network in the early 1870s when the Main South Line was built through the town and goods were first carried in October 1874. The official opening from Green Island to Balclutha was on 1 September 1875. Milton station was 3.13 km (1.94 mi) east of Clarksville, 5.87 km (3.65 mi) south of Milburn, 434.37 km (269.91 mi) from Christchurch and 35 mi 30 ch (56.9 km) from Dunedin.

In 1907, the town became a railway junction when an extension of the Roxburgh Branch was constructed alongside the Main South Line from its original junction at nearby Clarksville into Milton to facilitate better operations. In 1960, Milton lost this status when the extension was removed and the Roxburgh Branch's junction reverted to being in Clarksville. The Main South Line still runs through the town, though the station closed to passengers on 1 December 1970, when the South Island Limited was replaced by the Southerner, which didn't stop at Milton.

Milton had an engine shed for two engines, a 161 ft (49 m) passenger platform (later extended to 485 ft (148 m)), a 3rd class station, cart approach to the platform, 100 ft (30 m) by 30 ft (9.1 m) goods shed, loading bank, cattle yards, stationmaster's house, a refreshment room from 1895 to 1957 and a bookstall from 1897.

A 70 ft (21 m) turntable was added in 1927. There were fires at the engine shed in 1938 and in 1959, when both A Class locomotives in the shed were undamaged. There was also a fire at the station in 1942, and in a large shed in 1944.

The stockyards closed in 1971. In December 1988 there was still a station building, verandah, platforms and goods sheds, as can be seen in a 1986 aerial photo, but by 1995 they had gone.

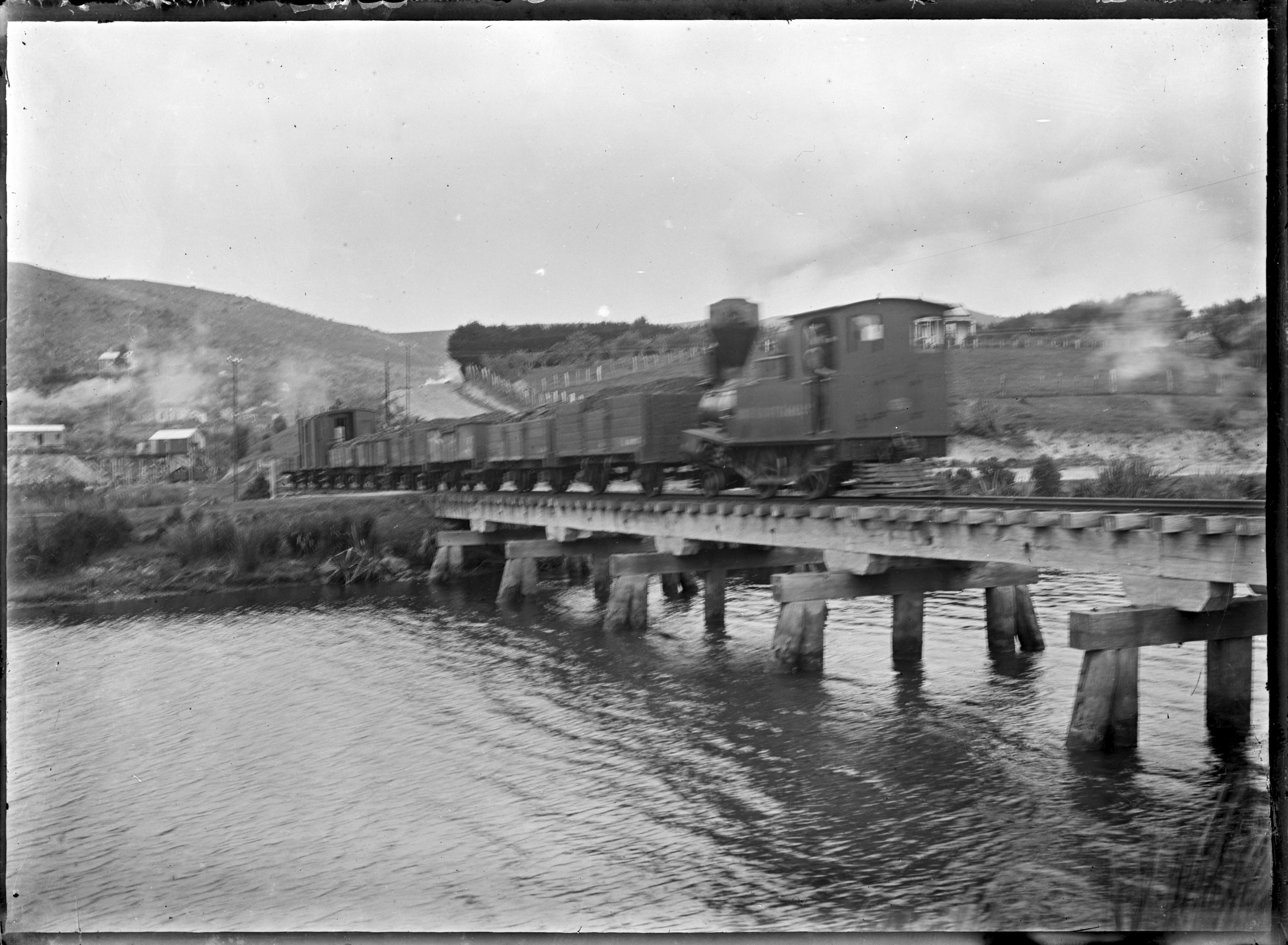
1908 railway bridge over the Tokomairaro River at Waronui ca. 1926

==== Fortification and Waronui coal mines and railway line ====
Coal was dug in the lower Tokomairaro valley from 1855. A railway was considered as early as 1875. Mining near Fortification Hill started in 1882. Poor roads and difficult navigation of the river limited production. The Fortification Railway and Coal Company started building a railway in 1900 and opened it on 3 April 1901, but went into liquidation in 1903. In 1906 the Bruce Coal Company Ltd opened a new mine across the river, calling it Waronui. A temporary bridge was built over the river, until the railway was extended about 1/2 mi (0.80 km) to the new mine when Glendining and Co took over in 1908. The line ran south west, crossing the Tokomairaro River a few times, from Milton, for about 6 mi (9.7 km) to mines at Fortification and Waronui. The line was little used after two miners were killed in 1930 and it was sold for scrap in 1932.

=== Milton pottery ===
An early claim to fame for Milton was its pottery, often regarded as some of the country's finest. Clay is a plentiful natural resource in South Otago, and potteries were a major employer in the late 19th century throughout South Otago and Southland. Between 1873 and 1915 numerous pottery works operated from the Milton area, starting with William White's short-lived Tokomairiro Steam Pottery Works, reputedly the first industrial kilns in the Southern Hemisphere.

The Milton Pottery works was rescued in 1880 by former Mayor of Dunedin (1876) Charles Reeves. The industry reached its height in the 1880s, at which time five kilns were operating and over 40 staff were employed, producing building materials such as bricks and tiles, sanitary ceramics such as washbasins, and domestic and decorative dinner sets, vases, and jars.

The industry in Milton did not survive the loss of manpower during World War I, though pottery as an industry continued in South Otago at Benhar near Balclutha, which was a major producer of toilet bowls and other domestic ceramics until the 1990s.

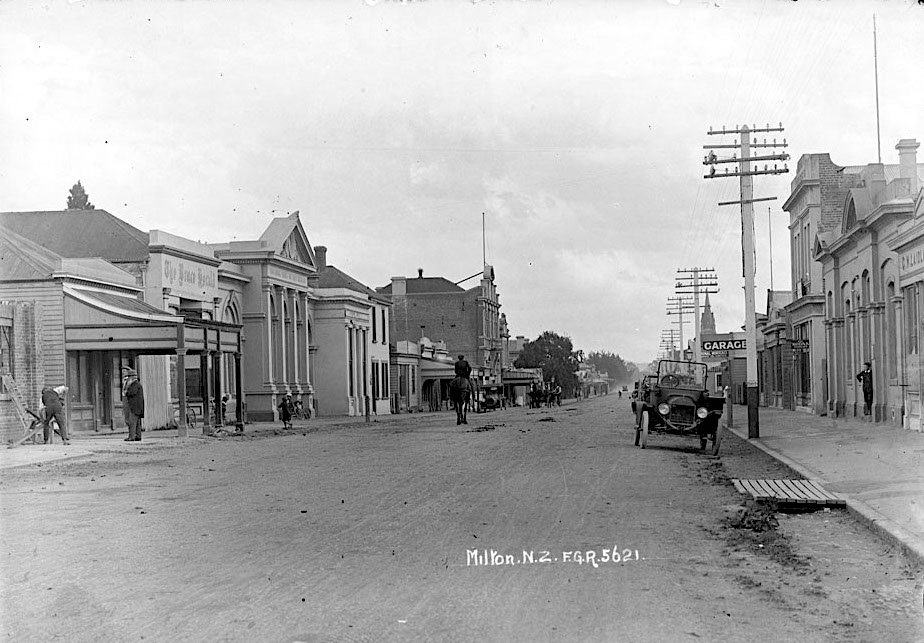
Union Street, Milton 1916. The Herald's office was on the left. Only the building being built on the far left and the 1902 Coronation Hall survived until 2020

=== Bruce Herald ===
The Bruce Herald was established by Joseph Mackay in 1864 and was one of the longest running country newspapers, closing on 7 October 1971. It was one of a chain, including the Mataura Ensign at Gore and Clutha Times at Balclutha. Other local papers were the Bruce Independent (1866–1867) and the Milton Mirror in 1905, but was taken over by the Herald after a fire at its office in 1910.

== Present ==
Today, Milton is, after Balclutha, the second largest town in South Otago. Its form is largely a ribbon development along the main highway (State Highway 1), with an extension north of the northern branch of the river (the suburb of Helensbrook). The old town of Fairfax is now a village with the Māori name of Tokoiti (meaning "small poles"). SH1, as Union Street, is the town's main road. Five main residential streets run parallel with Union Street (Elderlee, Ajax, Spenser, Johnson, and Chaucer Streets), with these streets being connected by other roads together forming a mostly regular grid pattern. Tokoiti lies one kilometre to the southeast.

Milton's main economic livelihood is as a service town for the surrounding farming community, although forestry is also becoming of increasing importance. It is also home to Calder Stewart, one of New Zealand's largest construction firms.

The farming settlement of Milburn two kilometres north of Milton, was chosen as the site of a new prison, opened in 2007 with a capacity of 485 prisoners. Officially referred to simply as the Otago Corrections Facility, it quickly picked up the nickname of "The Milton Hilton".

== Demographics ==
Milton covers 4.16 km^{2} (1.61 sq mi) and had an estimated population of 2,120 as of June 2025, with a population density of 510 people per km^{2}.

Historical population
| Year | Pop. | ±% p.a. |
|---|---|---|
| 1976 | 2,235 | — |
| 1981 | 2,262 | +0.24% |
| 1986 | 2,211 | −0.46% |
| 1991 | 2,088 | −1.14% |
| 1996 | 2,016 | −0.70% |
| 2001 | 1,917 | −1.00% |
| 2006 | 2,046 | +1.31% |
| 2013 | 2,070 | +0.17% |
| 2018 | 2,157 | +0.83% |

Milton had a population of 2,157 at the 2018 New Zealand census, an increase of 87 people (4.2%) since the 2013 census, and an increase of 111 people (5.4%) since the 2006 census. There were 861 households, comprising 1,086 males and 1,068 females, giving a sex ratio of 1.02 males per female. The median age was 42.9 years (compared with 37.4 years nationally), with 429 people (19.9%) aged under 15 years, 333 (15.4%) aged 15 to 29, 945 (43.8%) aged 30 to 64, and 447 (20.7%) aged 65 or older.

Ethnicities were 87.8% European/Pākehā, 17.8% Māori, 1.7% Pasifika, 1.9% Asian, and 1.8% other ethnicities. People may identify with more than one ethnicity.

The percentage of people born overseas was 8.3, compared with 27.1% nationally.

Although some people chose not to answer the census's question about religious affiliation, 56.1% had no religion, 33.4% were Christian, 0.4% had Māori religious beliefs, 0.3% were Hindu, 0.1% were Muslim, 0.1% were Buddhist and 1.8% had other religions.

Of those at least 15 years old, 123 (7.1%) people had a bachelor's or higher degree, and 591 (34.2%) people had no formal qualifications. The median income was $26,800, compared with $31,800 nationally. 150 people (8.7%) earned over $70,000 compared to 17.2% nationally. The employment status of those at least 15 was that 816 (47.2%) people were employed full-time, 252 (14.6%) were part-time, and 54 (3.1%) were unemployed.

== "The Kink" ==
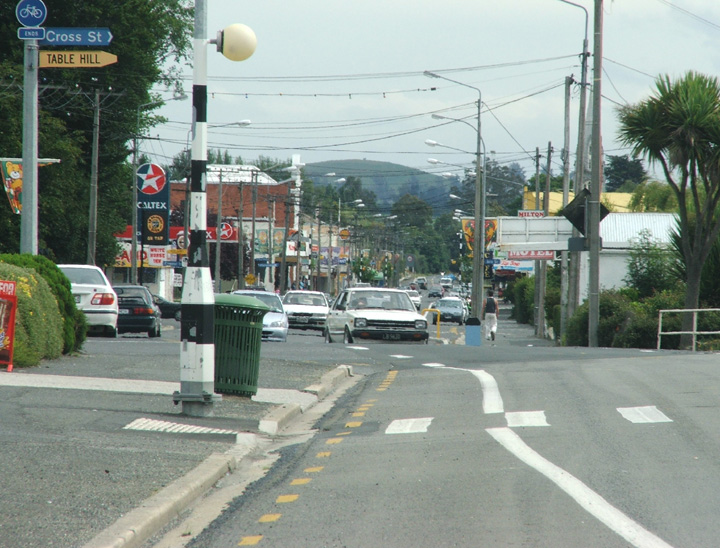
Cars navigate the infamous kink in Union Street, Milton

In Milton there is an unusual planning anomaly – the main street (Union Street) is straight for several kilometres as it runs across the Tokomairaro Plain and through the town, yet in the northern part of Milton it has a kink in it at 46°06′59.5″S 169°57′50.5″E. Heading north on the main street the road moves a whole road-width to the west.

The reason for the anomaly is disputed. A widely accepted view, but not the official view, states that the road was set out by two surveyors, one moving north and the other moving south, each of whom set out the road to the right of their survey line. Another widely held belief is that the change of course was designed to protect a large tree which formerly stood at the site where the kink is. However, why during the development of a milling area a single tree would be protected, and why the road would not return to its original line after passing the tree are both unexplained by this theory.

A story on the Kink was run by Stuff on 6 May 2021.

== In popular culture ==
Michael Palin describes Milton in his 1997 book Full Circle as a "small inconspicuous town". He goes on to say "Yet nowhere has looked more like Britain. A gothic spire rises from a red brick parish church. There is a Salvation Army hostel, A Cosy Dell rest home and an advert for 'Frosty Boy' lollipops – 'Often Licked, Never Beaten'. The gardens, and fields beyond could be straight from my Yorkshire birthplace. At around the time of my birth."

== Climate ==
Climate data for Milton (1971–2000 normals, extremes 1964–1985)
| Month | Jan | Feb | Mar | Apr | May | Jun | Jul | Aug | Sep | Oct | Nov | Dec | Year |
|---|---|---|---|---|---|---|---|---|---|---|---|---|---|
| Record high °C (°F) | 32.0 (89.6) | 33.6 (92.5) | 30.0 (86.0) | 26.8 (80.2) | 23.2 (73.8) | 17.8 (64.0) | 19.5 (67.1) | 20.5 (68.9) | 24.0 (75.2) | 27.8 (82.0) | 29.5 (85.1) | 29.9 (85.8) | 33.6 (92.5) |
| Mean daily maximum °C (°F) | 20.2 (68.4) | 20.4 (68.7) | 18.5 (65.3) | 15.8 (60.4) | 12.3 (54.1) | 9.6 (49.3) | 9.2 (48.6) | 11.0 (51.8) | 13.5 (56.3) | 15.5 (59.9) | 17.2 (63.0) | 19.0 (66.2) | 15.2 (59.3) |
| Daily mean °C (°F) | 14.8 (58.6) | 14.8 (58.6) | 13.0 (55.4) | 10.4 (50.7) | 7.6 (45.7) | 5.2 (41.4) | 4.8 (40.6) | 6.2 (43.2) | 8.4 (47.1) | 10.4 (50.7) | 11.9 (53.4) | 13.8 (56.8) | 10.1 (50.2) |
| Mean daily minimum °C (°F) | 9.4 (48.9) | 9.2 (48.6) | 7.5 (45.5) | 5.1 (41.2) | 2.9 (37.2) | 0.9 (33.6) | 0.3 (32.5) | 1.3 (34.3) | 3.3 (37.9) | 5.3 (41.5) | 6.6 (43.9) | 8.6 (47.5) | 5.0 (41.1) |
| Record low °C (°F) | 0.8 (33.4) | −0.4 (31.3) | −2.1 (28.2) | −3.1 (26.4) | −7.0 (19.4) | −8.1 (17.4) | −7.4 (18.7) | −6.7 (19.9) | −6.1 (21.0) | −2.9 (26.8) | −2.0 (28.4) | −1.3 (29.7) | −8.1 (17.4) |
| Average rainfall mm (inches) | 71 (2.8) | 52 (2.0) | 62 (2.4) | 63 (2.5) | 78 (3.1) | 73 (2.9) | 59 (2.3) | 47 (1.9) | 47 (1.9) | 58 (2.3) | 65 (2.6) | 72 (2.8) | 747 (29.5) |
Source: NIWA (rainfall 1951–1980)

== Education ==
=== Primary schools ===
Milton Primary School is a co-educational state primary school for Year 1 to 6 students, with a roll of 104 as of July 2026.

Tokoiti School is a co-educational state primary school for Year 1 to 6 students, with a roll of 37.

St Mary's School is a co-educational state-integrated Catholic primary school for Year 1 to 6 students, with a roll of 63.

=== Secondary schools ===
Tokomairiro High School is a co-educational state secondary school for Year 7 to 13 students, with a roll of 200.

== Notable people ==
- Ken Bloxham – All Black rugby player
- Richard Hayes – pilot
- Samantha Hayes – TV news journalist
- Thomas Joseph King –Army Officer
- Tony Kreft – All Black rugby player
- Frank Oliver – All Black rugby player
- Richard Pearse – aviation pioneer who lived in Milton for some time
- Martin Phillipps – musician who spent some of his childhood in Milton
- Edward Stewart – All Black rugby player
- Daryl Tuffey – test cricketer
- Arthur Anderson Martin – surgeon
