= Moa Flat =

Small settlement in rural New Zealand

- Rural area in New Zealand
- Location within New Zealand
- Coordinates: 45.7248°S 169.3057°E
- Country: New Zealand
- Region: Otago
- Territorial Authority: Clutha District
- Time zone: UTC+12 (NZST)
  - Summer (DST): UTC+13 (NZDT)

Moa Flat is a rural locality in West Otago on New Zealand's South Island. It lies on hills between the Clutha River and Pomahaka River and is primarily a pastoral farming area. The locality and surrounding sheep and beef farming lands have historical significance since the mid-19th century.

== Geography ==
Moa Flat is situated in the eastern part of the Clutha District, near the southern fringes of the Central Otago district. The area is 20-30 kilometres south of Roxburgh by road. The locality is set in the foothills of the southern end of the Southern Alps, with very little flat land to be found. The land is used mainly for sheep and beef farming.

== History ==
The area originally formed part of large pastoral farming station established in the 1850s. Moa Flat Station (sometimes reported as established in 1858) was founded by members of the Chalmers family and later managed or leased by other prominent run-holders. In the late 1800s and early 1900s, the property and its station buildings were important elements of the local pastoral economy.

Some historic station buildings associated with the early settlement and operation of the station are classed as a Category 2 Historic Place.

During the late 20th century and leading up to the present day, the area located in and around Moa flat has since broken up into many individual farms and stations, owned privately. The farms in the area are generally sheep and beef farms in connection to the meat industry in New Zealand.

== Economy and land use ==
The area is sparsely populated and most people living in the area are involved in sheep and beef farming in some way. There are no stores or retail outlets in the area.

== Notable features ==
- Road access to the area includes Moa Flat Road which connects the area to New Zealand State Highway 90 and New Zealand State Highway 8
- Lifesize Moa statue, composed of metal wire situated on the roadside of Moa Flat Road
- Local heritage records note early station buildings and farm structures that reflect 19th-century settlement patterns.

== Notable people ==
- Gordon Herriot Cunningham CBE FRS (1892–1962), mycologist and plant pathologist.
