= Georgia Heffernan =

New Zealand netball international

Personal information
- Full name: Georgia Anne Heffernan
- Born: 7 October 1999 (age 26) Invercargill, New Zealand
- Height: 1.81 m (5 ft 11 in)
- Relatives: Annette Heffernan (mother); Kate Heffernan (sister); Maxine Blomquist (aunt); Shirley Langrope (cousin)
- School: St Hilda's Collegiate School
- University: Otago Polytechnic

Netball career
- Playing positions: GA, GS
Years	Club team	Apps
2017–2019	Netball South	
2018–	Southern Steel	
2021	Southern Blast	
Years	National team	Caps
2024–	New Zealand	
Medal record
Netball
Representing New Zealand
Commonwealth Games
Gold medal – first place	2026 Glasgow	Team
Fast5 Netball World Series
Silver medal – second place	2023 Christchurch	Team
Bronze medal – third place	2022 Christchurch	Team

Georgia Heffernan (born 7 October 1999) is a New Zealand netball international who plays for Southern Steel. She was part of the New Zealand team which won gold at the 2026 Commonwealth Games.

Her mother, Annette Heffernan, her aunt, Maxine Blomquist, her sister, Kate Heffernan and a cousin, Shirley Langrope, are all New Zealand netball internationals. Her mother and aunt were the first set of sisters to play international netball for New Zealand. At the 2024 Netball Nations Cup, Georgia and her sister became the third set. However, the Heffernan sisters were the first sisters to play in the same team at the same time. As well as playing netball together for New Zealand, the Heffernan sisters have played together in several teams, including Southern Steel and the Otago Sparks women's cricket team.

== Early life, family and education ==
Georgia is the daughter of Noel and Annette Heffernan. Her mother, her aunt, Maxine Blomquist, her sister, Kate Heffernan and a cousin, Shirley Langrope, are all New Zealand netball internationals. Her father played rugby union for Canterbury Country. The Heffernan family live on their sheep and beef farm, near Tapanui, West Otago. The Heffernan sisters attended Tapanui's Blue Mountain College and St Hilda's Collegiate School. Georgia attended Otago Polytechnic, where she studied veterinary nursing.

== Club career ==
=== St Hilda's ===
In 2016 and 2017, the Heffernan sisters were members of the St Hilda's Collegiate School team that won back-to-back South Island secondary school netball titles. 2016 was the first time St Hilda's had reached the final five stage and final of the tournament. In the 2016 final, Georgia scored 25 from 35 as St Hilda's defeated Marlborough Girls' College 38–37. She scored the winner in the final seconds. In 2016 the St Hilda's team assistant coach was their mother, Annette Heffernan.

=== Netball South ===
Between 2017 and 2019, the Heffernan sisters played for Netball South in the National Netball League. Ahead of the 2018 season, while playing for Netball South, they were also named as training partners for Southern Steel. After recovering from an ACL injury, Georgia was also included in the 2021 squad. The team was now renamed Southern Blast.

=== Southern Steel ===
Since 2018, Georgia has played for Southern Steel. She made her senior debut for Steel in the 2018 Super Club tournament. During the 2019 ANZ Premiership season she made five appearances. She also played in the 2019 Super Club tournament. On 28 June 2020, during a Round 3 match against Northern Stars she suffered an ACL injury after landing awkwardly. Georgia subsequently missed the rest of the 2020 season and the whole of the 2021 season as she recovered. Since 2022, she has been a regular member of the Steel team. Her sister, Kate Heffernan, also played for Steel.

ANZ Premiership statistics

Season	Team	G/A	GA	RB	CPR	FD	IC	DF	PN	TO	MP
2019	Steel	12/23 (52%)	8	1	11	12	0	4	2	9	5
2020	Steel	12/16 (75%)	7	0	10	11	0	0	1	8	4
2021	Steel	0/0	0	0	0	0	0	0	0	0	0
2022	Steel	140/192 (73%)	168	5	128	199	1	3	32	70	15
2023	Steel	214/285 (75%)	?	19	198	238	9	14	47	99	15
Career											

== International career ==
Heffernan played for New Zealand in the 2022 Fast5 Netball World Series. On 5 November 2022 she made her Fast5 debut against Uganda. In July 2022 she played for a Mixed Invitational team in the Cadbury Netball Series. During the series she played against the senior New Zealand team, featuring her sister Kate Heffernan. It was the first time Georgia and Kate had played against each other.

On 20 January 2024, Heffernan made her senior debut for New Zealand against Australia during the 2024 Netball Nations Cup. She was originally only selected as training partner for the series. However, after impressing in training, Noeline Taurua promoted her to the starting seven. With her sister, Kate, already an established member of the team, the Heffernan sisters now became the third set of sisters to play international netball for New Zealand. The first set were their mother and aunt, Annette Heffernan and Maxine Blomquist. However, the Heffernan sisters are the first sisters to actually play in the same team at the same time. Heffernan was named in the squad for the 2026 Commonwealth Games, where the Silver Ferns won their first Commonwealth Games gold medal in 16 years, defeating Jamaica in the final.

Tournaments	Place
2022 Fast5 Netball World Series	3rd
2023 Fast5 Netball World Series	2nd
2024 Netball Nations Cup	3rd
2025 Taini Jamison Trophy Series	1st
2025 Constellation Cup	2nd
2025 New Zealand netball tour of Great Britain	
2026 Commonwealth Games	1st

== Cricket ==
The Heffernan sisters are also notable women's cricket players. Georgia has represented Otago at under-15, under-16 and under-21 levels. Georgia and Kate Heffernan also won national titles representing St Hilda's Collegiate School. In 2018, Georgia played for Otago Sparks, once again alongside Kate.

== Honours ==
=== New Zealand ===
- Commonwealth Games: 2026

=== Southern Steel ===
- ANZ Premiership: 2018
