= Crookston, New Zealand =

Coordinates: 45°51′10″S 169°20′15″E

Crookston is a small rural settlement in West Otago, in the South Island of New Zealand. It is located on SH 90 between Tapanui and Edievale, and lies 6 km east of Heriot.

The name of Crookston is likely in honour of an early surveyor. The settlement was previously known as Crookston Flat and McKellars Flat.
