= Kate Heffernan =

New Zealand netball and cricket international

Personal information
- Full name: Kate Alexandra Heffernan
- Born: 7 October 1999 (age 27) Invercargill, New Zealand
- Height: 1.81 m (5 ft 11 in)
- Relatives: Annette Heffernan (mother); Georgia Heffernan (sister); Maxine Blomquist (aunt); Shirley Langrope (cousin)
- School: St Hilda's Collegiate School
- University: University of Otago

Netball career
- Playing positions: WD, C, WA
Years	Club team	Apps
2017–2019	Netball South	
2018–2025	Southern Steel	
2026-	Adelaide Thunderbirds	
Years	National team	Caps
2022–	New Zealand	50
Medal record
Netball
Representing New Zealand
Commonwealth Games
Gold medal – first place	2026 Glasgow	Team
Bronze medal – third place	2022 Birmingham	Team

Kate Alexandra Heffernan (born 7 October 1999) is a New Zealand netball international and former cricketer who plays for Adelaide Thunderbirds in the Super Netball. She was part of the New Zealand team which won gold at the 2026 Commonwealth Games. In 2018, she also made two appearances for the New Zealand women's national cricket team.

Heffernan comes from a family of netball internationals: at the 2024 Netball Nations Cup, Kate and her sister, Georgia Heffernan, became the third set of sisters to play international netball for New Zealand. Her mother, Annette Heffernan and her aunt, Maxine Blomquist, were the first set. However, the Heffernan sisters were the first sisters to play in the same team at the same time. A cousin, Shirley Langrope, was also a New Zealand netball international. As well as playing netball together for New Zealand, the Heffernan sisters have played together in several teams, including the Southern Steel netball team and the Otago Sparks women's cricket team.

== Early life, family and education ==
Heffernan is the daughter of Noel and Annette Heffernan. Her mother, her aunt, Maxine Blomquist, her sister, Georgia Heffernan and a cousin, Shirley Langrope, are all New Zealand netball internationals. Her father played rugby union for Canterbury Country. The Heffernan family live on their sheep and beef farm, near Tapanui, West Otago. The Heffernan sisters attended Tapanui's Blue Mountain College and St Hilda's Collegiate School. Kate attended the University of Otago, where she studied psychology.

== Cricket career ==
Kate Heffernan
Cricket information
- Batting: Right-handed
- Bowling: Left-arm medium-fast
- Role: Bowler

International information
- National side: New Zealand (2018)
- T20I debut (cap 50): 16 March 2018 v West Indies
- Last T20I: 20 March 2018 v West Indies

Domestic team information
- Years: Team
- 2016/17–2018/19: Otago Sparks

Career statistics
Competition	WT20I	WLA	WT20
Matches	2	11	19
Runs scored	–	61	8
Batting average	–	12.20	4.00
100s/50s	–	0/0	0/0
Top score	–	20*	4
Balls bowled	36	510	408
Wickets	1	6	13
Bowling average	29.00	60.00	27.84
5 wickets in innings	0	0	0
10 wickets in match	0	0	0
Best bowling	1/14	2/35	4/21
Catches/stumpings	0/–	1/–	5/–
- Source: CricketArchive, 17 August 2021

=== Early years ===
Heffernan represented Otago at under-15 and under-16 levels. She and Georgia Heffernan also won national titles representing St Hilda's Collegiate School.

=== Otago Sparks ===
Between 2016 and 2019, Heffernan played as a left-arm medium bowler for Otago Sparks. She played 28 matches for Sparks. She was a member of the Sparks team that won the 2016–17 New Zealand Women's Twenty20 Competition. In the final against Canterbury Magicians, Heffernan took 4–21 off her four overs. Her 2018 Sparks team mates included her sister, Georgia Heffernan.

=== New Zealand ===
In February 2018, Heffernan was called up to play for New Zealand. She subsequently made two women's Twenty20 international appearances. On 16 March 2018 she made her WT20I debut against the West Indies during their tour of New Zealand. On 20 March 2018 she made a second appearance against the same opponents.

== Club netball career ==
=== St Hilda's ===
In 2016 and 2017, the Heffernan sisters were members of the St Hilda's Collegiate School team that won back-to-back South Island secondary school netball titles. 2016 was the first time St Hilda's had reached the final five stage and final of the tournament. In 2016 the St Hilda's team assistant coach was their mother, Annette Heffernan.

=== Netball South ===
Between 2017 and 2019, the Heffernan sisters played for Netball South in the National Netball League. Ahead of the 2018 season, while playing for Netball South, they were also named as training partners for Southern Steel.

=== Southern Steel ===
Since 2018, Heffernan has played for Southern Steel. On 11 June 2018, she made her senior debut for Steel in a Round 6 match against Mainland Tactix. She joined Steel as a replacement for an injured Dani Gray and received a contract for the remainder of the season. She was a fringe member of the Steel team that won the 2018 ANZ Premiership. However, she subsequently established herself as senior member of the Steel team. She initially played for Steel at wing defence before switching to centre for the 2021 season. Her sister, Georgia Heffernan, also plays for Steel.

ANZ Premiership statistics

Season	Team	G/A	GA	RB	CPR	FD	IC	DF	PN	TO	MP
2018	Steel	0/0	?	0	6	?	0	8	10	1	4
2019	Steel	0/0	16	0	51	38	22	20	118	8	16
2020	Steel	0/0	14	0	69	21	18	36	101	12	14
2021	Steel	0/0	133	0	11	298	25	39	134	54	16
2022	Steel	0/0	172	0	41	333	24	41	103	47	15
2023	Steel	0/0	?	0	23	366	26	37	97	46	15
Career											

== International netball career ==
In August 2021, Heffernan was included in the 2021–22 New Zealand squad. She was subsequently included in the squad for the 2021 Taini Jamison Trophy Series, but didn't get on court. On 12 October 2021, she made her unofficial debut for New Zealand against New Zealand Men. She was included in the 2022 Commonwealth Games squad and, on 30 July 2022, she eventually made her senior debut in New Zealand's opening match against Northern Ireland. In just her sixth test, she helped New Zealand win the bronze medal. She went on to represent New Zealand at the 2023 Netball World Cup and was named Midcourter of the Tournament.

Ahead of the 2024 Netball Nations Cup, Heffernan was named vice-captain to Phoenix Karaka. During the tournament Georgia Heffernan made her senior debut for New Zealand against Australia. The Heffernan sisters now became the third set of sisters to play international netball for New Zealand. The first set were their mother and aunt, Annette Heffernan and Maxine Blomquist. However, the Heffernan sisters are the first sisters to actually play in the same team at the same time. On 22 January 2024, Heffernan captained New Zealand in the match against Uganda. Heffernan was named in the squad for the 2026 Commonwealth Games, where the Silver Ferns won their first Commonwealth Games gold medal in 16 years, defeating Jamaica in the final.

Tournaments	Place
2021 Taini Jamison Trophy Series	2nd
2022 Commonwealth Games	3rd place, bronze medalist(s)
2022 Taini Jamison Trophy Series	1st
2022 Constellation Cup	2nd
2023 Netball Quad Series	2nd
2023 Netball World Cup	4th
2023 Taini Jamison Trophy Series	1st
2023 Constellation Cup	2nd
2024 Netball Nations Cup	3rd
2024 Taini Jamison Trophy Series	2nd
2024 Constellation Cup	1st
2025 Taini Jamison Trophy Series	1st
2025 Constellation Cup	2nd
2025 New Zealand netball tour of Great Britain	
2026 Commonwealth Games	1st

== Honours ==
=== New Zealand ===
- Commonwealth Games: 2026
- Constellation Cup: 2024
- Taini Jamison Trophy: 2023, 2025

=== Southern Steel ===
- ANZ Premiership: 2018

=== Otago Sparks ===
- Women's Super Smash: 2016–17
