= State Highway 90 (New Zealand) =

Road in New Zealand

State Highway 90

Route information
- Maintained by NZ Transport Agency Waka Kotahi
- Length: 59.2 km (36.8 mi)

Major junctions
- Southwest end: Waipahi Highway McNab, New Zealand
- Northeast end: Beaumont Highway Raes Junction, New Zealand

Location
- Country: New Zealand
- Primary destinations: Tapanui

Highway system
- New Zealand state highways; Motorways and expressways; List
← SH 88	→ SH 91

State Highway 90 (SH 90) is a New Zealand State Highway connecting the town of Gore on State Highway 1 to the locality of Raes Junction on State Highway 8 via Tapanui, servicing the agricultural areas of eastern Southland and West Otago. It is mostly hilly and is just under 60 kilometres long.

== Route ==
The highway starts in a north-easterly direction from the Gore suburb of McNab to the locality of Willowbank, where the highway turns right at an at-grade T intersection. The road crosses the Southland/Otago boundary via a series of rolling hills into Waikoikoi. The highway veers back to the northeast and crosses the Pomahaka River to enter Tapanui. The highway passes through Crookston and runs parallel with the Blue Mountains until it reaches Edievale where the road curves to the east. The highway then begins to descend towards the Clutha Valley before terminating at Raes Junction.

== See also ==
- List of New Zealand state highways
