= Tapanui Branch =

Railway line in New Zealand

Overview
- Other name(s): Kelso Branch
- Status: Closed
- Owner: Railways Department
- Locale: Otago, New Zealand
- Termini: Waipahi; Edievale
- Stations: 7

Service
- Type: Heavy Rail
- System: New Zealand Government Railways (NZGR)
- Operator(s): Railways Department

History
- Opened: 1880
- Extended to Heriot: 1884
- Extended to Edievale: 1905
- Closed beyond Heriot: 1968
- Closed: 1978

Technical
- Line length: 42.3 km (26.3 mi)
- Number of tracks: Single
- Character: Rural
- Track gauge: 3 ft 6 in (1,067 mm)

Map

The Tapanui Branch was a railway line located near the border of the regions of Southland and Otago, New Zealand. Although the name suggests that it terminated in Tapanui, its furthest terminus was actually in Edievale. Construction of the line began in 1878 with the first section opened in 1880, and it operated until 1978, when it was destroyed by flooding from the Pomahaka River.

== Construction ==
In the second half of the 19th century, farmers in the region desired a railway connection to enhance the value of their land and provide easier access to markets, and received support from interests in Dunedin, who, in the days before the abolition of provinces in 1876, feared a loss of trade to Invercargill. In 1877, district engineer W. N. Blair proposed a route to Central Otago via Tapanui, but this proved unpopular outside of Tapanui and its immediate surrounds. However, approval was granted for the construction of a branch line in the area and construction began in 1878, leaving the Main South Line at Waipahi, located 50 kilometres west of Balclutha. The first locomotive for the line was delivered on 8 July 1880 and the Public Works Department began operating trains to Tapanui three days later. The official opening ceremony in Tapanui was held on 24 November 1880, though the actual line, at 25.13 kilometres in length, was opened to a settlement just beyond Tapanui named Kelso on 1 December 1880. In this year, it was proposed to build a line westwards to the Waikaia area from Kelso, but the proposals came to nothing and the Waikaia Branch was built from Riversdale on the Waimea Plains Railway instead.

An extension of 7.11 kilometres from Kelso to Heriot was opened on 1 April 1884. The local newspaper, the Tapanui Courier, believed that only a short tunnel and some clay cuttings in the Dunrobin Hills stood in the way of extending the railway line to the Clutha River and then on to Roxburgh. In 1900, the government chose to extend the railway from Heriot to Edievale pending a final decision on the route to Roxburgh, and this ten kilometre extension was opened on 18 February 1905, bringing the branch's total length to 42.3 kilometres. Edievale proved to be the final terminus when the line from Milton via Lawrence was extended to Roxburgh instead.

== Stations ==
The following stations were located on the Tapanui Branch (in brackets is the distance in kilometres from the junction in Waipahi):

- Conical Hill (7 km)
- Pomahaka (13 km)
- Glenkenich (17 km)
- Tapanui (21 km)
- Kelso (25 km)
- Heriot (32 km)
- Edievale (42 km)

== Operation ==
In the early days, a mixed train operated from Edievale daily. These mixed trains connected with mainline expresses and local Invercargill-Clinton services at the junction in Waipahi. The line was indispensable before the expansion of decent road networks, but as improvements came in road transport in the 20th century, traffic began to decline. The Great Depression did not help the line's fortunes, with revenue dropping as fast as expenditure was rising in 1930. To save money, passenger services on the line were cancelled and replaced by buses, thus making the mixed trains goods-only, and the Edievale locomotive depot closed on 1 January 1934. The freight service was run when required, operating regularly on weekdays for many years, but it continued to lose money. The under-utilised section from Heriot to Edievale was closed on 1 January 1968 as it only saw 4,000 tonnes of traffic a year, but enough traffic existed to justify the existence of the rest of the line for a few more years, with tonnages varying between 30,000 and 60,000 tonnes in the 1970s. The freight carried at this time was mainly from the State Forest's Conical Hill Sawmill located nine kilometres up the line, and phosphate from the Southland Co-op Phosphate Co.'s works near Bluff to West Otago Transport in Heriot. In March 1969, trains were re-organised to operate from Gore, and the aged A class steam locomotives that typically ran trains on the branch were replaced by D^{J} class diesel-electric engines (steam locomotive power fully disappeared from New Zealand's railway system by the end of 1971).

Catastrophe hit the line in mid-October 1978. Extremely severe flooding along the Pomahaka River demolished bridges and washed out the trackage in many places, and costly repairs would not have been economic. Formal closure was confirmed two months later in December.

Before its closure in 1962, the Waikaka Branch ran in a valley parallel to that occupied by the Tapanui Branch, and trivia associated with operation of the lines is that locomotive crews in one valley claimed they were sometimes able to see smoke from a steam engine operating in the other valley.

== Today ==
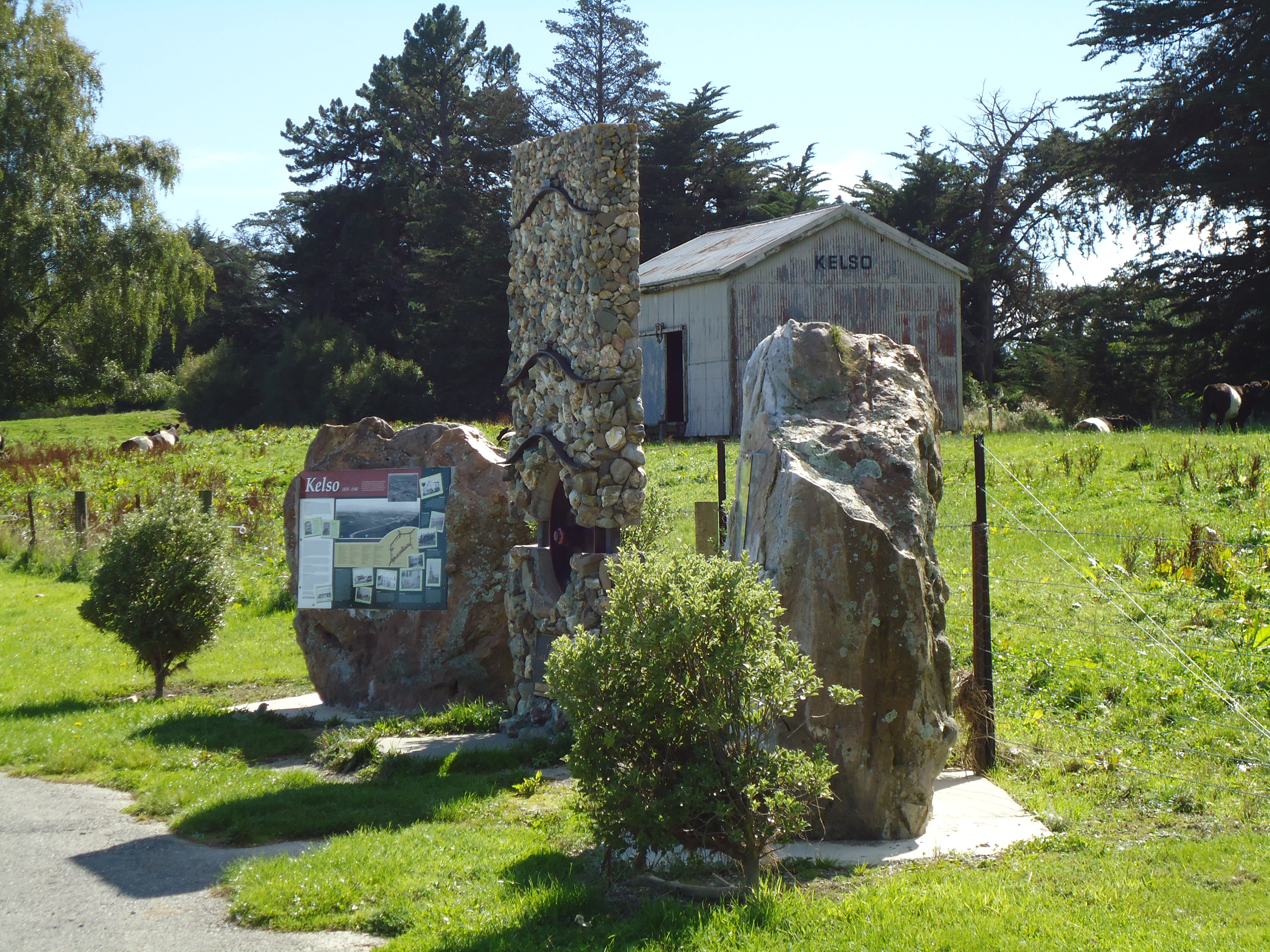
The railway goods shed at Kelso sits behind a monument to the Kelso flood.

Relics of this branch survive today, though as time progresses, remnants of old railways deteriorate and in some cases disappear entirely, so what was previously evident may no longer exist. Bridges sans rails are believed to still exist in the early stages of the line, notably including a truss bridge across the Pomahaka River. The Tapanui railway station and yard were never in Tapanui township; they were situated approximately 2 km away in a field adjacent to the Station Rd level crossing. The Tapanui railway yard precinct remains obvious, as are the stands of macrocarpa trees that once defined its limits, although the station building is gone. The hump in Station Rd that was the level crossing and an old commercial building beside the level crossing also remain. Flooding almost entirely destroyed Kelso and it is now abandoned, though the railway's second goods shed still exists. On lower ground is the ruins of the town's former service station, with sombre viewing created by flood levels marked on the doors.

There was "still plenty to see" in the 1990s, and "the flood markings alone are sobering". The large Heriot goods shed is understood to have been removed in the late 1990s.
