= Annette Heffernan =

New Zealand netball international

Personal information
- Full name: Annette Heffernan (Née: Blomquist)
- Born: 4 November 1962 (age 64)
- Height: 1.78 m (5 ft 10 in)
- Relatives: Maxine Blomquist (sister); Shirley Langrope (cousin); Kate Heffernan (daughter); Georgia Heffernan (daughter)

Netball career
- Playing positions: GK, GD
| Years | National team | Caps |
| 1985–1990 | New Zealand | 9 |
Medal record
Representing New Zealand
World Netball Tournament
| Gold medal – first place | 1987 Glasgow | Team |
World Games
| Gold medal – first place | 1985 London | Team |
| Gold medal – first place | 1989 Karlsruhe | Team |

Annette Heffernan is a former New Zealand netball international. Between 1985 and 1990, she made nine senior appearances for New Zealand. She was a member of the New Zealand teams that won gold medals at the 1987 World Netball Tournament and the 1985 and 1989 World Games. Her sister, Maxine Blomquist, their cousin, Shirley Langrope, and her twin daughters, Kate Heffernan and Georgia Heffernan, have all played international netball for New Zealand. Annette and Maxine were the first set of sisters to play international netball for New Zealand. Kate and Georgia were the third set.

== Early life and family ==
Heffernan is originally from Canterbury. She is the sister of Maxine Blomquist and a cousin of Shirley Langrope, who are also former New Zealand netball internationals. She is married to Noel Heffernan, who played rugby union for Canterbury Country. Together they have three children. Their twin daughters, Kate Heffernan and Georgia Heffernan are both New Zealand netball internationals.

== Netball career ==
=== New Zealand ===
Between 1985 and 1990, Heffernan made nine senior appearances for New Zealand. On 2 February 1985, she made her senior debut against England during the netball tournament at the Australia Games. Her sister, Maxine Blomquist, was already a New Zealand netball international. Annette and Maxine were the first set of sisters to play international netball for New Zealand. She was subsequently a member of the New Zealand team that won the gold medal at the 1985 World Games. A knee injury on the eve of the 1987 World Netball Tournament limited Heffernan's involvement to just one match. Heffernan won a third gold medal at the 1989 World Games. At the 1990 Commonwealth Games, she also played for New Zealand against Australia in a one-off match when netball was a demonstration sport. During the Ruth Aitken era, Heffernan served as a New Zealand selector.

| Tournaments | Place |
|---|---|
| 1985 Australia Games | 1st |
| 1985 World Games | 1st place, gold medalist(s) |
| 1987 World Netball Tournament | 1st place, gold medalist(s) |
| 1989 World Games | 1st place, gold medalist(s) |
| 1990 Commonwealth Games | 2nd |

=== Coach ===
Heffernan has served as an assistant coach and/or team manager of several teams that featured her twin daughters, Kate Heffernan and Georgia Heffernan. These have included their St Hilda's Collegiate School team and the Netball South team in the National Netball League.

== Honours ==
New Zealand

- World Netball Tournament
  - Winners: 1987
- World Games
  - Winners: 1985, 1989
