= West Otago =

Coordinates: 45°56′35″S 169°15′40″E

West Otago is the local name given to part of the region of Otago, New Zealand, lying close to the border with Southland. It is administratively connected to South Otago, but is geographically separated from it by a range of hills known as the Blue Mountains. The largest settlements in West Otago are Tapanui and Heriot, and other localities within the area include Moa Flat, Edievale, Crookston, Merino Downs, and Waikoikoi. The area described as West Otago is sometimes extended to include Lawrence, Clinton, and Beaumont. The ghost town of Kelso also lies within West Otago. Other notable features of the area include Conical Hill and Landslip Hill, the latter being a major fossil-bearing formation.

West Otago is connected to the New Zealand State Highway network by SH 90 , which runs north–south through the Pomahaka valley linking SH 1 near Gore and SH 8 at Raes Junction. The area was formerly also served by a rail branch line, the Tapanui Branch, which ran from 1880 until 1978.

European settlement in the area dates back to the 1850s. Early settlers in the region included William Pinkerton, an Englishman who had been a runholder in Australia for over a decade, who first cleared land for farming around Tapanui in 1857. A Scottish settler, Adam Oliver, and his wife Agnes, had settled further down the Pomahaka valley the previous year. Prior to European arrival, the area was a Māori moa-hunting area, but had little if any permanent settlement.

West Otago consists of rolling farmland and forested hills close to the Pomahaka River. Livestock farming (sheep and cattle) is a major industry in the area, and Tapanui is historically a forestry centre.

== Demographics ==
The West Otago statistical area, which is identical in area to the West Otago ward of Clutha District, covers 1,374.72 km^{2} (530.78 sq mi) and had an estimated population of 2,260 as of June 2025, with a population density of 2 people per km^{2}.

Historical population
Year	Pop.	±% p.a.
2006	2,232	—
2013	2,169	−0.41%
2018	2,289	+1.08%

West Otago had a population of 2,289 at the 2018 New Zealand census, an increase of 120 people (5.5%) since the 2013 census, and an increase of 57 people (2.6%) since the 2006 census. There were 909 households, comprising 1,182 males and 1,107 females, giving a sex ratio of 1.07 males per female. The median age was 40.1 years (compared with 37.4 years nationally), with 507 people (22.1%) aged under 15 years, 351 (15.3%) aged 15 to 29, 1,062 (46.4%) aged 30 to 64, and 366 (16.0%) aged 65 or older.

Ethnicities were 90.8% European/Pākehā, 10.6% Māori, 0.7% Pasifika, 2.8% Asian, and 2.5% other ethnicities. People may identify with more than one ethnicity.

The percentage of people born overseas was 10.7, compared with 27.1% nationally.

Although some people chose not to answer the census's question about religious affiliation, 53.5% had no religion, 37.0% were Christian, 0.1% had Māori religious beliefs, 0.5% were Hindu, 0.3% were Muslim, 1.0% were Buddhist and 0.8% had other religions.

Of those at least 15 years old, 237 (13.3%) people had a bachelor's or higher degree, and 399 (22.4%) people had no formal qualifications. The median income was $35,400, compared with $31,800 nationally. 243 people (13.6%) earned over $70,000 compared to 17.2% nationally. The employment status of those at least 15 was that 1,014 (56.9%) people were employed full-time, 318 (17.8%) were part-time, and 24 (1.3%) were unemployed.
