= Crookstown =

Crookstown may refer to:

- Crookstown, County Cork, Ireland
- Crookstown, County Kildare, Ireland

== See also ==
- Crookston (disambiguation)
