= King's High School, Dunedin =

King's High School

Location
- 270 Bayview Road; Dunedin; New Zealand; 45.903217°S 170.494294°E

Information
- Type: State Secondary
- Motto: "Building Men For Life"
- Established: 1936
- Sister school: Queen's High School
- Ministry of Education Institution no.: 383
- Rector: Nick McIvor
- Gender: Boys
- Enrolment: 879 (July 2026)
- Houses: Stuart; Hanover; Tudor; Windsor
- Colours: Navy, Light Blue
- Socio-economic decile: 7O
- Website: kingshigh.school.nz Facebook page

King's High School is a state single-sex boys' secondary school in Dunedin, New Zealand. It is located at the southern end of the city close to the boundary between the suburbs of South Dunedin, St. Clair and Forbury, next to the parallel single-sex girls' school, Queen's High School. Both schools share several facilities, including the Performing Arts Centre which opened in 2006.

== History ==
The school first opened in 1936, and held its 75th anniversary in late 2010.

In 2011, the school had the highest National Certificate of Educational Achievement (NCEA) pass rates for state boys' schools in New Zealand. Among the results, the level one score averaged at 93.4% (a significant increase from 71% in 2008). In 2017, NCEA pass rates continued to be above the national average, with NCEA Level One averaging 96.6%, and Level Three averaging 90.0%.

King's had 722 pupils in 2007, growing to 1,008 pupils in 2014, the highest roll in King's 78-year history. The size of the roll also meant that King's became the largest school in the Otago region, overtaking Taieri College in the process. (the school has since been overtaken as the region's largest by Wakatipu High School in Queenstown). Since then, student numbers have remained steady, measuring 1,041 students in 2018.

In mid February 2021, King's High School attracted domestic media attention after a 16 year old African-American student was told by the rector that he could not wear cornrows. His parents and older sister objected to the cornrow ban, describing it as racist, discriminatory, and ignoring its cultural significance to African Americans. The rector initially defended the cornrow ban as part of Kings' uniform policy. In response to media and public interest, the rector amended Kings' uniform policy to recognise cultural needs when students' hairstyles were considered; allowing the student to wear his cornrows while attending the school.

== Enrolment ==
As of July 2026, King's High School has roll of 879 students, of which 170 (19.3%) identify as Māori.

As of 2026, the school has an Equity Index of 453, placing it amongst schools whose students have average socioeconomic barriers to achievement (roughly equivalent to deciles 5 and 6 under the former socio-economic decile system).

== Facilities ==
King's High School was re-built across almost a decade in the mid-1990s. The school has separate sports facilities, a purpose-built catering suite and performing arts centre. The school also has a camp and classroom off-site in Warrington, north of Dunedin, which students in year nine visit for their school camp.

In 2006, King's High School (along with Queen's) added a multimillion-dollar performing arts centre, with a capacity of almost 500. The facility is used by both schools, and the surrounding community. In 2010, renovations were made to the schools gymnasium. Later in 2018, renovations took place in the art department with plans for additional upgrading.

== House system ==
New students to King's are placed into one of four houses – Tudor, Windsor, Stuart or Hanover, based on the Historic English royal houses. Throughout the year, juniors and seniors compete in many sports, cultural and performance based activities. In term four, the house with the most points wins the 'Koedyk shield'. Some events include: touch rugby, football, basketball, athletics, cross country, softball, singing, haka competition, debating and chess. Athletics, Singing and the haka competition are all full school, compulsory events worth double house points. All other interhouse events are optional and done at lunchtime.

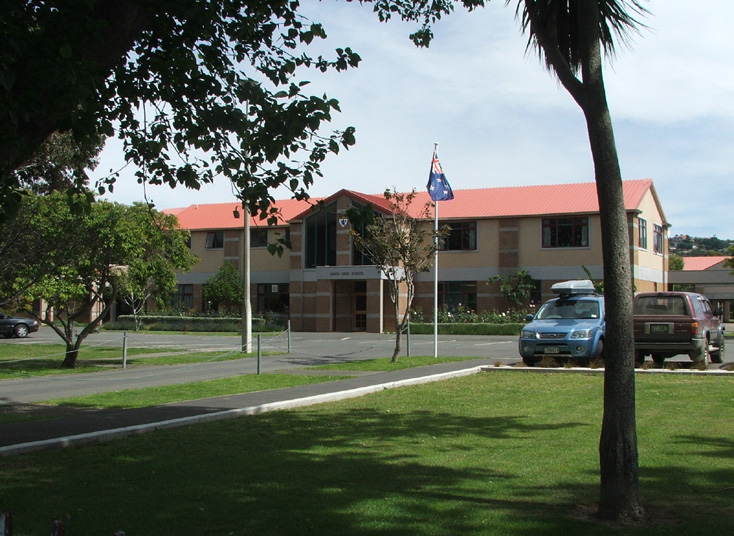
King's High School, taken of the front.

== Notable alumni ==
The arts

- James K. Baxter – poet and social critic
- Tony Ballantyne – author and historian
- Barry Cleavin – artist
- Christopher de Hamel – academic librarian, historian and writer
- Nathaniel Otley – composer
- Grahame Sydney – painter
- Riki Gooch – musician (TrinityRoots)

Broadcasting and media

- Murray Deaker – radio and television sports show host
- Peter Montgomery – yachting commentator
- Ian Templeton – political journalist

Public service

- David Benson-Pope – politician
- Warren Cooper – politician
- Grant Robertson – politician

Sport

- Tony Brown – rugby union player
- Glen Denham – basketballer
- Carl Hayman – rugby union player
- Chris Laidlaw – rugby union player, diplomat, politician, broadcaster, author
- Warren Lees – cricket player and coach
- Laurie Mains – rugby union player and coach
- Brendon McCullum – cricketer
- Nathan McCullum – cricketer
- Joe McDonnell – rugby union player
- Paul Miller – rugby union player
- Ken Rutherford – cricketer
- Brad Scott – cricketer
- Ben Smith – rugby union player
- Kupu Vanisi – rugby union player
- Tom Willis – rugby union player
- Uili Koloʻofai – rugby union player

== Rector list ==
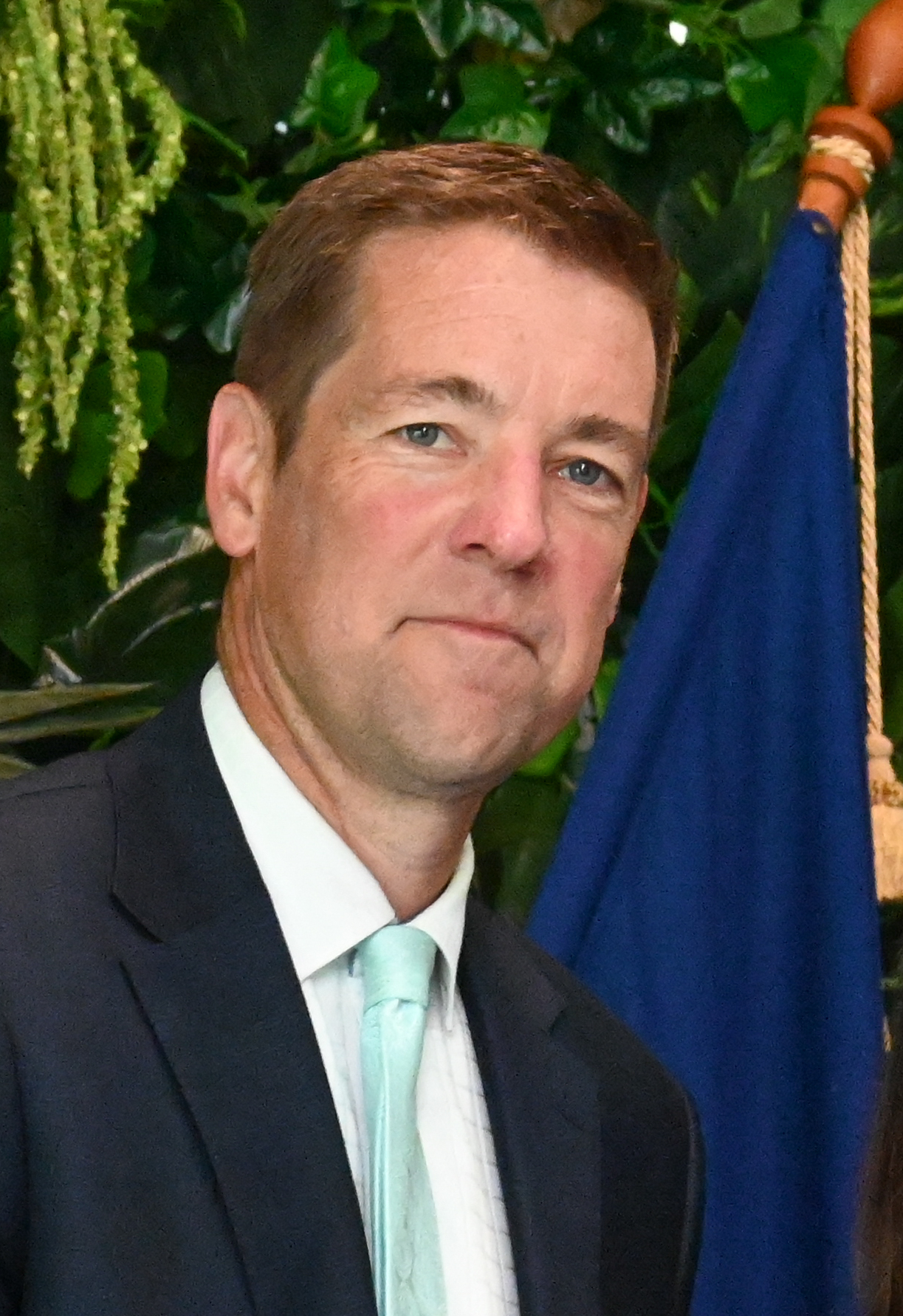
Dan Reddiex in 2022

- Dudley Chisholm (1936–1947)
- Bill Lang (1948–1961)
- Harry Craig (1962–1966)
- Jack Bremner (1966–1981)
- Ian Simpson (1982–1997)
- Lindsay James (LJ) Hocking (1997–2001)
- Colin Donald (2001–2008)
- Dan Reddiex (2008–2019)
- Nick McIvor (2019–present)
