= G. H. Cunningham =

New Zealand mycologist (1892–1962)

Gordon Herriot Cunningham CBE FRS
- Born: 27 August 1892; Moa Flat, Otago, New Zealand
- Died: 18 July 1962 (aged 69); Palmerston North, New Zealand
- Education: Victoria University College
- Notable work: The rust fungi of New Zealand; Fungus diseases of fruit-trees in New Zealand
- Spouse: Madge Leslie McGregor
- Mother: Helen Donaldson Cunningham (née Heriot)
- Awards: Hector Medal (1948)
- Scientific career
- Fields: Plant pathology
- Author abbrev. (botany): G.Cunn.

Gordon Herriot Cunningham CBE FRS (27 August 1892 – 18 July 1962) was the first New Zealand-based mycologist and plant pathologist. In 1936 he was appointed the inaugural director of the DSIR Plant Diseases Division. Cunningham established the New Zealand Fungal Herbarium, and he published extensively on taxonomy of many fungal groups. He is regarded as the 'Father' of New Zealand mycology.

== Biography ==
In his life, he was a boxer, motorcyclist, gold prospector, farmer, horticulturist, forestry worker, and Gallipoli veteran. Following this colourful early life, 'G.H. Cunn.' joined the Biological Laboratory staff at the Department of Agriculture in 1919 as a mycologist, and began a systematic survey of plant diseases in New Zealand. He also began his work classifying fungi. In 1925, he published the first New Zealand work on plant diseases, Fungus Diseases of Fruit Trees in New Zealand. When the Biological Laboratory was moved from Wellington to Palmerston North in 1928 to become the Plant Research Station, Cunningham became the head of a mycology laboratory. The Plant Research Station disbanded in 1936, and Cunningham become the director of the DSIR Plant Diseases Division.

Cunningham produced definitive monographs of New Zealand Gasteromycetes (puffballs), Polyporaceae (pore fungi), Thelephoraceae (crust fungi), and Uredinales (rust fungi).

He made major contributions to plant pathology in New Zealand, especially with therapeutics and naming of pathogens. In the 1949 King's Birthday Honours, Cunningham was appointed a Commander of the Order of the British Empire for services in the field of plant research and plant diseases.

In 2004, Landcare Research named the rooms hosting the New Zealand Fungal Herbarium at its Auckland site the GH Cunningham Mycology Suite in his honour.

== See also ==
- Category:Taxa named by Gordon Herriot Cunningham
