= Marie Crowe =

New Zealand psychotherapy academic

- Education: Griffith University
- Scientific career
- Fields: Psychotherapy
- Workplaces: University of Otago
- Thesis: Doing what no normal woman would do (1998)
- Doctoral students: Jean Ross

Marie T. Crowe is a New Zealand psychotherapy academic, and as of 2019 is a full professor at the University of Otago.

== Academic career ==
After a 1998 PhD titled 'Doing what no normal woman would do' at the Griffith University, Crowe moved to the University of Otago, rising to full professor in 2012.

One of Crowe's notable doctoral students is Jean Ross, professor at Otago Polytechnic.

== Selected works ==
- Inder, Maree L., Marie T. Crowe, Stephanie Moor, Suzanne E. Luty, Janet D. Carter, and Peter R. Joyce. ""I actually don't know who I am": The impact of bipolar disorder on the development of self." Psychiatry: Interpersonal and Biological Processes 71, no. 2 (2008): 123–133.
- Inder, Maree L., Marie T. Crowe, Peter R. Joyce, Stephanie Moor, Janet D. Carter, and Sue E. Luty. ""I really don't know whether it is still there": Ambivalent acceptance of a diagnosis of bipolar disorder." Psychiatric Quarterly 81, no. 2 (2010): 157–165.
- Crowe, Marie T., and Jane O'Malley. "Teaching critical reflection skills for advanced mental health nursing practice: A deconstructive–reconstructive approach." Journal of advanced nursing 56, no. 1 (2006): 79–87.
- Inder, Maree L., Marie T. Crowe, Suzanne E. Luty, Janet D. Carter, Stephanie Moor, Christopher M. Frampton, and Peter R. Joyce. "Randomized, controlled trial of Interpersonal and Social Rhythm Therapy for young people with bipolar disorder." Bipolar disorders 17, no. 2 (2015): 128–138.
