= Edievale =

Coordinates: 45°48′00″S 169°21′45″E

Edievale is a small settlement in West Otago, in New Zealand's South Island. It lies equidistant between Heriot, which lies to the west, and Raes Junction, which lies to the east, on State Highway 90.

Though the settlement is now home to only a few residents, it was formerly larger, and between 1905 and the 1970s served as the terminus of the Tapanui Branch railway. With the closure of that line due to repeated flooding, the settlement dwindled to its current size.

Edievale was named after pioneering settler John Edie.
