= Crookston =

Crookston can refer to:

- Crookston, Glasgow, Scotland
  - Crookston Castle
- Crookston, Minnesota, United States
  - University of Minnesota Crookston
- Crookston, Nebraska, United States
- Crookston, Ontario, Canada; a community
- Crookston, New Zealand
