= Jackie Barron =

New Zealand sports administrator

Jacqueline Barron is a New Zealand sports administrator and school principal.

== Biography ==
Barron was born in Whakatāne, in the North Island of New Zealand.

As a sports administrator, Barron has managed the Southern Steel netball team and the New Zealand under-21 netball team. She was manager of New Zealand's women's rugby team, the Black Ferns, when they won the 2002 Women's Rugby World Cup. She was also manager of New Zealand's netball team, the Silver Ferns, from 2005 to 2009. In 2013 Barron was appointed to the board of Sport New Zealand and served two terms. In 2019 she was elected to New Zealand Football's executive committee.

Barron has held a number of senior leadership positions at New Zealand high schools. She has been deputy principal of Gore High School, principal of Woodford House, Havelock North, and in 2015 became principal of St Hilda's Collegiate School in Dunedin.

=== Recognition ===
In the 2017 Queen's Birthday Honours Barron was made a Member of the New Zealand Order of Merit for her service to sports governance and education.
