= Shirley Langrope =

New Zealand netball international

Personal information
- Full name: Shirley Anne Langrope
- Born: 15 November 1945 (age 81)
- Height: 1.68 m (5 ft 6 in)
- Relatives: Maxine Blomquist (cousin); Annette Heffernan (cousin); Kate Heffernan (cousin); Georgia Heffernan (cousin)

Netball career
- Playing positions: WA, C, WD
Years	National team	Caps
1969–1975	New Zealand	19
Medal record
Representing New Zealand
World Netball Tournament
Silver medal – second place	1971 Kingston	Team
Bronze medal – third place	1975 Auckland	Team

Shirley Anne Langrope (born 15 November 1945) is a former New Zealand netball international. Between 1969 and 1975, she made 19 senior appearances for New Zealand. She was a member of the New Zealand team that won a silver medal at the 1971 World Netball Tournament and captained New Zealand when they won a bronze medal at the 1975 World Netball Tournament. Four of her cousins – Maxine Blomquist, Annette Heffernan, Kate Heffernan and Georgia Heffernan – have all played international netball for New Zealand.

== Early life and family ==
Langrope is originally from Canterbury. Four of her cousins – Maxine Blomquist, Annette Heffernan, Kate Heffernan and Georgia Heffernan – have all played international netball for New Zealand.

== Netball career ==
=== New Zealand ===
Between 1969 and 1975, Langrope made 19 senior appearances for New Zealand. On 20 June 1969 she made her senior debut for New Zealand against Australia. She was selected as a replacement for Judy Blair after she dropped out to attend her brother's wedding. She was subsequently a member of the New Zealand team that won a silver medal at the 1971 World Netball Tournament. In 1974 she captained New Zealand for an away series against England. Her team mates for the series included her cousin, Maxine Blomquist. She again captained New Zealand when they won a bronze medal at the 1975 World Netball Tournament. However, she was injured during the tournament and had to watch the final matches from the sidelines. In June 2000, at a celebration of Netball New Zealand's 75th anniversary, Langrope was named as a reserve in a New Zealand "dream team".

Tournaments	Place
1971 World Netball Tournament	2nd place, silver medalist(s)
1975 World Netball Tournament	3rd place, bronze medalist(s)

== Schoolteacher ==
Langrope became a schoolteacher and lived in Auckland. In 1992, she moved back to Christchurch to teach at South New Brighton School. In 2021, she was still listed as a staff member.
