= Maxine Blomquist =

New Zealand netball international

Personal information
- Born: 13 March 1956 (age 70)
- Height: 1.80 m (5 ft 11 in)
- Relatives: Annette Heffernan (sister); Kate Heffernan (niece); Georgia Heffernan (niece); Shirley Langrope (cousin)

Netball career
- Playing positions: GK, GD, WD, WA, GA, GS
Years	National team	Caps
1974–1982	New Zealand	31
Medal record
Representing New Zealand
World Netball Tournament
Gold medal – first place	1979 Trinidad	Team
Bronze medal – third place	1975 Auckland	Team

Maxine Blomquist (born 13 March 1956) is a former New Zealand netball international. Between 1974 and 1982, she made 31 senior appearances for New Zealand. She was a member of the New Zealand teams that won a gold medal at the 1979 World Netball Tournament and a bronze medal at the 1975 World Netball Tournament. Her sister, Annette Heffernan, their cousin, Shirley Langrope, and her two nieces, Kate Heffernan and Georgia Heffernan, have all played international netball for New Zealand. Maxine and Annette were the first set of sisters to play international netball for New Zealand. Kate and Georgia were the third set.

== Early life and family ==
Blomquist is originally from Canterbury. She is the sister of Annette Heffernan and a cousin of Shirley Langrope, who are also former New Zealand netball internationals. Annette and Maxine were the first set of sisters to play international netball for New Zealand. Her two nieces, Kate Heffernan and Georgia Heffernan are also both New Zealand netball internationals. In 2024, they became the third set.

== Netball career ==
=== New Zealand ===
Between 1974 and 1982, Blomquist made 31 senior appearances for New Zealand. On 9 November 1974, she made her senior debut against England during an away tour. Her cousin Shirley Langrope captained New Zealand on this tour and again when they were teammates at the 1975 World Netball Tournament. Blomquist was known as a defender and she regularly played in all three defensive positions. Her versatility and height also saw used as a goal attack. She was also a member of the New Zealand teams that won a gold medal at the 1979 World Netball Tournament.

Tournaments	Place
1975 World Netball Tournament	3rd place, bronze medalist(s)
1979 World Netball Tournament	1st place, gold medalist(s)
