= Peter Snow (doctor) =

New Zealand doctor

- Born: 11 November 1934
- Died: 28 February 2006 (aged 71)
- Occupation: General practitioner

Peter Grahame Snow (11 November 1934 – 28 February 2006) was a New Zealand general practitioner. He served the rural community of Tapanui for over 30 years. He was president of the Royal New Zealand College of GPs from 1998 to 1999 and received their highest honour, Distinguished Fellowship, in 2001. He was a member of the Otago Hospital Board and its successor, the Otago District Health Board. He was the first doctor to report what turned out to be myalgic encephalomyelitis/chronic fatigue syndrome (ME/CFS) in New Zealand.

== Education ==
As a boy, Snow attended Auckland Grammar School, graduating with the class of 1948.

While training in medicine he expressed an interest in general practice, so when a position became available he took up general practice in Tapanui.

== Practice ==
In 1984 he was presented with a number of patients with a prolonged exertional 'flu-like illness, but presenting no diagnosable condition. While some people thought they were no different from commonly found "tired all the time" cases, Dr Snow was convinced that they were indeed sick and proceeded to investigate. Many were sheep farmers who previously had a perfect record of health. Observing a similarity between the symptoms of stock suffering from selenium deficiency and these patients, he was the first doctor in New Zealand to identify the disease which turned out to be an outbreak of myalgic encephalomyelitis/chronic fatigue syndrome. Owing to, often disparaging, publicity surrounding these discoveries and a study into them by Snow, Marion Poore, and Charlotte Paul, the illness came to be known in New Zealand as "Tapanui flu" after the town of the same name in West Otago.

Snow also became concerned at the number of farmers injured in farm accidents, particularly those involving motorcycles, and made recommendations for improving farm safety. He campaigned unsuccessfully to prevent the closure of the Tapanui hospital, at which he was on call 24 hours a day, seven days a week.

== Retirement, death and legacy ==
After more than 30 years in Tapanui, Snow and his wife retired to Lake Hayes. Peter Snow died on 28 February 2006. A memorial to Snow, comprising a Moon rock and plaque, was unveiled in the main street of Tapanui on 8 August 2009. The Moon rock was chosen because of Snow's belief that a meteor had collided with the Moon in 1766 and dispersed debris across West Otago.

Since 2007 Hauora Taiwhenua Rural Health Network has conferred the annual Peter Snow Memorial Award to commemorate Snow's contributions to rural health. The award recognises an "outstanding contribution to rural health in either service, health research or innovation". Notable winners include Pat Farry, Tim Malloy, Graeme Fenton, Garry Nixon, and Professor Jean Ross.
