= Ihlara McIndoe =

New Zealand composer

Ihlara Jayne McIndoe (born 1997) is a New Zealand composer.

== Early life and education ==
McIndoe was born in 1997. Growing up she learnt the piano and played in school orchestras and sang in choirs. She attended St Hilda's Collegiate School in Dunedin and the University of Otago where she graduated with a BA (Hons), a BMus and LLB. She studied composition with Anthony Ritchie, Peter Adams, Dylan Llardelli, Chris Gendall and Graeme Downes.

== Career ==
In 2018, McIndoe led the Aotearoa Youth Leadership Institution delegation to the 62nd Commission on the Status of Women in New York City.

McIndoe visited Antarctica in 2020 as an Inspiring Explorer with the Antarctic Heritage Trust. Using sounds she recorded there as inspiration she composed five pieces: On Satin Waters, Wavering Horizon, On Whistling Sands, Ushuaia Sketches and Ephemeral Boundaries. All five works were performed in A Musical Journey to Antarctica a live-streamed concert in Christchurch in 2022. Memory Traps (2023) was a finalist for the SOUNZ Contemporary Award at the APRA Awards. The work uses poetry by Hera Lindsay Bird.

In 2021, she was Composer in Residence with the National Youth Orchestra. From 2021 to 2022 McIndoe spent almost two years working as a lawyer in Wellington. Her area of interest was litigation, public law and public arts institutions in particular. She held the voluntary position of Marketing Manager for the New Zealand Women's Law Journal.

McIndoe studied at McGill University graduating with an MMus. As of 2024, McIndoe is attached to the Department of Music at Columbia University.

== Awards ==
In 2016, she won the Douglas Lilburn Student Composition Award. In 2022 she received an Arts Excellence Award from the Dame Malvina Major Foundation towards her study for a Masters at McGill University.

== Personal life ==
McIndoe is married to New Zealand composer Nathaniel Otley.

== Selected works ==
=== Publications ===
- McIndoe, Ihlara. (2018). Playing sardines: how civil society forces its way into the United Nations. The Spinoff. 2 April 2018
- Ihlara McIndoe. (2022). Elbowing through the crowd. Public Sector (Wellington), 45(2), 21.

=== Compositions ===
- petrichor (2019) – for orchestra
- On Satin Waters (2020) – for violin, viola and audio recordings
- Wavering Horizon (2020) – for flute
- On Whistling Sands (2020) – for violin, flute and guitar
- Ushuaia Sketches (2020) – for violin
- Ephemeral Boundaries (2020) – for orchestra
- Mirror Traps (2023) – for soprano and chamber ensemble
- I write and chew and crack my bones and think about hospitality (ca 2022) – for soprano and ensemble, commissioned for Stroma
