= 2018 Southern Steel season =

Southern Steel season

Southern Steel
- 2018 season
- Head coach: Reinga Bloxham
- Asst. coach: Lauren Piebenga
- Manager: Dayna Kaio
- Captain: Wendy Frew
- Main venue: Stadium Southland

Season results
- Wins–losses: 21–0
- Regular season: 1st
- Finals placing: ANZ Premiership winners Super Club 3rd place
- Team colours

Southern Steel seasons
- ← 2017 2019 →

The 2018 Southern Steel season saw the Southern Steel netball team compete in the 2018 ANZ Premiership and the 2018 Netball New Zealand Super Club. With a team coached by Reinga Bloxham, captained by Wendy Frew and featuring Gina Crampton, Shannon Francois, Te Paea Selby-Rickit and Te Huinga Reo Selby-Rickit, Steel retained the ANZ Premiership title, winning their second consecutive premiership after defeating Central Pulse 54–53 in the grand final. In the Super Club tournament, Steel finished third.

== Players ==
=== Player movements ===
Gains and losses
▲ Gains	▼ Losses
Jess Allan (Netball South); Courtney Elliott (Waikato NNL); Taneisha Fifita (Netball South); Georgia Heffernan (Netball South); Kate Heffernan (Netball South); Malysha Kelly (Adelaide Thunderbirds); Kendall McMinn (Netball South)	Aliyah Dunn (Central Pulse); Jamie Hume (Northern Mystics); Jhaniele Fowler-Reid (West Coast Fever); Malysha Kelly; Jane Watson (Mainland Tactix)

Notes

^1 Malysha Kelly was injured during pre-season.

=== 2018 roster ===
2018 Southern Steel roster
Players
Coaching staff

Nat.	Name	Position(s)	DoB	Height
(New Zealand)	Jess Allan	GS		–
(New Zealand)	Olivia Bates	GA, WA	20 March 1991 (aged 27)	1.73 m (5 ft 8 in)
(New Zealand)	Gina Crampton (vc)	WA, C	7 December 1991 (aged 26)	1.74 m (5 ft 9 in)
(New Zealand)	Courtney Elliott	GK, GD, WD	25 September 1998 (aged 19)	1.80 m (5 ft 11 in)
(New Zealand)	Abby Erwood	GA, C, WA	18 April 1997 (aged 21)	1.83 m (6 ft 0 in)
(New Zealand)	Taneisha Fifita (TRP)	GK, GD	3 February 2001 (aged 17)	1.85 m (6 ft 1 in)
(New Zealand)	Shannon Francois	WA, C, GA	12 October 1990 (aged 27)	1.76 m (5 ft 9 in)
(New Zealand)	Wendy Frew (c)	WD, C, WA	15 October 1984 (aged 33)	1.74 m (5 ft 9 in)
(New Zealand)	Dani Gray (injured)	WD, C	3 November 1995 (aged 22)	1.80 m (5 ft 11 in)
(New Zealand)	Georgia Heffernan	GA, GS	7 October 1999 (aged 18)	1.81 m (5 ft 11 in)
(New Zealand)	Kate Heffernan (TRP)	WD, C, WA	7 October 1999 (aged 18)	1.81 m (5 ft 11 in)
(New Zealand)	Kendall McMinn (TRP)	GD, WD, C	15 April 1992 (aged 26)	1.75 m (5 ft 9 in)
(New Zealand)	Jennifer O'Connell	GS	16 June 1997 (aged 20)	1.93 m (6 ft 4 in)
(New Zealand)	Te Huinga Reo Selby-Rickit	GK, GD	3 April 1989 (aged 29)	1.84 m (6 ft 0 in)
(New Zealand)	Te Paea Selby-Rickit	GS, GA	14 January 1992 (aged 26)	1.93 m (6 ft 4 in)

Head coach

- (New Zealand) Reinga Bloxham

Assistant coach

- Lauren Piebenga

Manager: Dayna Kaio
Physiotherapist:
Corina Ngatuere
Strength and conditioning:
Mike Jacob

Notes

- (c) – Captain
- (cc) – Co-captain
- (vc) – Vice-captain
- – Injury / maternity leave
- (TRP) – Temporary Replacement Player

Notes

^2 Georgia Heffernan, Taneisha Fifita, Jess Allan and Kendall McMinn were included in the extended squad for the Super Club.

=== Debuts ===
- Kendall McMinn made her senior debut for Steel in Round 3 against Northern Mystics.
- Kate Heffernan and Taneisha Fifita made their senior debut for Steel in Round 6 against Mainland Tactix.

== Pre-season ==
Sunshine Coast Lightning series

In March 2018, Steel played a two match series against the 2017 Suncorp Super Netball premiers, Sunshine Coast Lightning.

15 March 2018	Southern Steel	46–50	Sunshine Coast Lightning	Edgar Centre
		Report

16 March 2018	Southern Steel	39–64	Sunshine Coast Lightning	ILT Stadium Southland
		Report

Pre-Season Tournament

Steel also participated in the official pre-season tournament at Te Wānanga o Raukawa in Otaki from 20 to 22 April.

Fri 20 April	Southern Steel	53–44	Northern Mystics	Te Wānanga o Raukawa
1:00 pm		Report

Sat 21 April	Central Pulse	64–40	Southern Steel	Te Wānanga o Raukawa
12:00 pm

Sun 22 April	Southern Steel	66–53	Northern Stars	Te Wānanga o Raukawa
12:00 pm

== ANZ Premiership regular season ==
=== Fixtures and results ===
Round 1

Steel's unbeaten run in competitive matches continued into the 2018 season. However, after defeating Northern Mystics in their opening match, they were beaten 62–51 by Central Pulse, ending a 22–match win streak. The streak included 17 ANZ Premiership matches and five Super Club matches.

Sun 6 May	Northern Mystics	47–55	Southern Steel	Fly Palmy Arena
2:10 pm	Tera-Maria Amani 19/21 (90%); Jamie Hume 14/20 (70%); Bailey Mes 14/27 (52%)	Report; Stats	Olivia Bates 0/3 (0%); Jennifer O'Connell 20/23 (87%); Te Paea Selby-Rickit 35/46 (76%)

Mon 7 May	Central Pulse	62–51	Southern Steel	Fly Palmy Arena
7:40 pm	Aliyah Dunn 41/45 (91%); Tiana Metuarau 21/22 (95%)	Report; Stats	Jennifer O'Connell 33/39 (85%); Te Paea Selby-Rickit 18/27 (67%)

Round 2

Wed 16 May	Southern Steel	64–60	Waikato Bay of Plenty Magic	More FM Arena
7:40 pm	Olivia Bates 3/3 (100%); Jennifer O'Connell 29/35 (83%); Te Paea Selby-Rickit 32/39 (82%)	Report; Stats	Monica Falkner 24/27 (89%); Amorangi Malesala 4/5 (80%); Lenize Potgieter 32/39 (82%)

Round 3

Mon 21 May	Southern Steel	56–52	Northern Mystics	ILT Stadium Southland
7:40 pm	Jennifer O'Connell 37/42 (88%); Te Paea Selby-Rickit 19/24 (79%)	Report; Stats	Tera-Maria Amani 6/7 (86%); Jamie Hume 15/24 (63%); Bailey Mes 31/31 (100%)

Round 4

Wed 30 May	Central Pulse	71–40	Southern Steel	Te Rauparaha Arena
7:40 pm	Aliyah Dunn 50/54 (93%); Ameliaranne Ekenasio 12/19 (63%); Tiana Metuarau 9/12 (75%)	Report; Stats	Olivia Bates 1/3 (33%); Jennifer O'Connell 21/26 (81%); Te Paea Selby-Rickit 18/27 (67%)

Round 5

Sun 3 Jun	Southern Steel	63–61	Northern Stars	ILT Stadium Southland
4:10 pm	Olivia Bates 5/6 (83%); Jennifer O'Connell 21/27 (78%); Te Paea Selby-Rickit 37/46 (80%)	Report; Stats	Paula Griffin 19/22 (86%); Maia Wilson 42/45 (93%)

Round 6

Sun 10 Jun	Northern Stars	60–63	Southern Steel	Horncastle Arena
12:10 pm	Paula Griffin 12/13 (92%); Ellen Halpenny 10/13 (77%); Maia Wilson 38/46 (83%)	Report; Stats	Jennifer O'Connell 37/44 (84%); Te Paea Selby-Rickit 26/30 (87%)

Mon 11 Jun	Mainland Tactix	52–53	Southern Steel	Horncastle Arena
5:40 pm	Kate Beveridge 1/1 (100%); Ellie Bird 36/42 (86%); Brooke Leaver 15/22 (68%)	Report; Stats	Olivia Bates 1/5 (20%); Jennifer O'Connell 28/33 (85%); Te Paea Selby-Rickit 24/33 (73%)

Round 7

Wed 20 Jun	Northern Mystics	62–57	Southern Steel	North Shore Events Centre
5:40 pm	Maria Folau 29/35 (83%); Bailey Mes 33/37 (89%)	Report; Stats	Jennifer O'Connell 41/46 (89%); Te Paea Selby-Rickit 16/25 (64%)

Round 8

Sun 24 Jun	Southern Steel	52–53	Mainland Tactix	More FM Arena
4:10 pm	Jennifer O'Connell 42/52 (81%); Te Paea Selby-Rickit 10/16 (63%)	Report; Stats	Kate Beveridge 9/12 (75%); Ellie Bird 38/43 (88%); Brooke Leaver 6/9 (67%)

Round 9

Mon 2 Jul	Southern Steel	51–47	Central Pulse	ILT Stadium Southland
7:40 pm	Jennifer O'Connell 30/37 (81%); Te Paea Selby-Rickit 21/28 (75%)	Report; Stats	Aliyah Dunn 22/23 (96%); Ameliaranne Ekenasio 11/12 (92%); Tiana Metuarau 14/20 (70%)

Round 10

Mon 9 Jul	Waikato Bay of Plenty Magic	60–76	Southern Steel	Claudelands Arena
7:40 pm	Lenize Potgieter 41/41 (100%); Monica Falkner 19/22 (86%)	Report; Stats	Jennifer O'Connell 53/55 (96%); Te Paea Selby-Rickit 23/26 (88%)

Round 11

Mon 16 Jul	Southern Steel	59–56	Mainland Tactix	ILT Stadium Southland
7:40 pm	Jen O'Connell 40/49 (82%); Te Paea Selby-Rickit 19/23 (83%)	Report; Stats	Ellie Bird 40/51 (78%); Brooke Leaver 16/22 (73%)

Round 12

Sun 22 Jul	Southern Steel	75–58	Waikato Bay of Plenty Magic	Vodafone Events Centre
6:10 pm	Jen O'Connell 51/63 (81%); Te Paea Selby-Rickit 24/27 (89%)	Report; Stats	Lenize Potgieter 42/44 (95%); Monica Falkner 16/20 (80%)

Round 13

Sun 29 Jul	Northern Stars	65–59	Southern Steel	Vodafone Events Centre
4:10 pm	Maia Wilson 41/44 (93%); Paula Griffin 24/26 (92%)	Report; Stats	Te Paea Selby-Rickit 48/52 (92%); Olivia Bates 11/14 (79%)

=== Final standings ===
2018 ANZ Premiership ladder
Pos	Team	P	W	L	GF	GA	GD	G%	BP	Pts
1	Central Pulse	15	12	3	850	679	+171	125.2	3	27
2	Southern Steel	15	10	5	874	866	+8	100.9	2	22
3	Mainland Tactix	15	7	8	746	761	−15	98	5	19
4	Northern Mystics	15	7	8	783	796	−13	98.4	3	17
5	Waikato Bay of Plenty Magic	15	5	10	804	878	−74	91.6	3	13
6	Northern Stars	15	4	11	832	909	−77	91.5	5	13

Qualified for Grand final and the 2018 Netball New Zealand Super Club
Qualified for Elimination final and the 2018 Netball New Zealand Super Club

== ANZ Premiership Finals Series ==
=== Elimination final ===
Wed 8 Aug; 7:45 pm	Report; Stats	Southern Steel	53–49	Mainland Tactix	ILT Stadium Southland	Sky Sport
Wed 8 Aug; 7:45 pm	Report; Stats	Scoring by quarter: 15-12, 13-17, 12-12, 13-8			ILT Stadium Southland	Sky Sport
Wed 8 Aug; 7:45 pm	Report; Stats	Jen O'Connell 38/40 (95%); Te Paea Selby-Rickit 15/22 (68%)		Ellie Bird 42/45 (93%); Kate Beveridge 4/5 (80%); Brooke Leaver 3/3 (100%)	ILT Stadium Southland	Sky Sport

=== Grand final ===
Sun 12 Aug; 4:15 pm	Central Pulse	53–54	Southern Steel	Fly Palmy Arena	Sky Sport
Sun 12 Aug; 4:15 pm	Scoring by quarter: 16–14, 14–14, 12–14, 11–16			Fly Palmy Arena	Sky Sport
Sun 12 Aug; 4:15 pm	Aliyah Dunn 32/35 (91%); Ameliaranne Ekenasio 17/25 (68%); Tiana Metuarau 4/4 (100%)		Jen O'Connell 40/44 (91%); Te Paea Selby-Rickit 14/18 (78%)	Fly Palmy Arena	Sky Sport

== Netball New Zealand Super Club ==
=== Group stage ===
19 August 2018	Southern Steel	61–65	Gauteng Jaguars
8.30pm	Jennifer O'Connell 28/36 (78%); Georgia Heffernan 12/26 (46%); Olivia Bates 8/18 (44%)	Report; Stats	Ine-Marí Venter 40/48 (83%); Chantelle Swart 16/26 (62%)

20 August 2018	Southern Steel	80–52	Sneakers
6.40pm	Jennifer O'Connell 40/51 (78%); Georgia Heffernan 24/38 (63%); Olivia Bates 5/11 (45%); Jess Allan 2/4 (50%)	Report; Stats	Xin Yi Liu 13/22 (59%); Pei Ying Wong 12/27 (44%); Amorangi Malesala 8/15 (53%)

21 August 2018	Southern Steel	66–51	Mainland Tactix
8.30pm	Jennifer O'Connell 44/51 (86%); Olivia Bates 9/13 (69%); Georgia Heffernan 7/13 (54%)	Report; Stats	Ellie Bird 20/27 (74%); Brooke Leaver 11/21 (52%); Kate Beveridge 10/13 (77%); Jess Prosser 2/3 (67%)

=== Final ladder ===
Group A
Pos	Team	P	W	D	L	GF	GA	%	BP	Pts
1	(New Zealand) Southern Steel	3	2	0	1	207	168	123.2	1	7
2	(New Zealand) Mainland Tactix	3	2	0	1	201	153	131.4	0	6
3	(South Africa) Gauteng Jaguars	3	2	0	1	173	172	100.6	0	6
4	(Singapore) Sneakers	3	0	0	3	150	238	63.0	0	0

Qualified for Semi-finals
5th/8th place classification

=== 1st/4th Play offs ===
23 August 2018	Central Pulse	64–55	Southern Steel
8.30pm	Aliyah Dunn 34/39 (87%); Ameliaranne Ekenasio 18/26 (69%); Tiana Metuarau 3/6 (50%)	Stats	Jennifer O'Connell 28/35 (80%); Georgia Heffernan 13/26 (50%); Olivia Bates 4/8 (50%)

=== Third place play-off ===
24 August 2018; 6.40pm	Report; Stats	Southern Steel	54–45	NSWIS	Sky Sport
24 August 2018; 6.40pm	Report; Stats	Scoring by quarter: 11–7, 26–22, 36–35, 54–45			Sky Sport
24 August 2018; 6.40pm	Report; Stats	Jennifer O'Connell 31/34 (91%); Georgia Heffernan 12/21 (57%); Jess Allan 4/5 (80%); Olivia Bates 2/7 (29%); Shannon Francois 1/1 (100%)		Matisse Letherbarrow 16/22 (73%); Georgia Marshall 14/19 (74%); Kelly Singleton 8/15 (53%)	Sky Sport

== Award winners ==
=== Team of the season ===
Two Southern Steel players were named in Brendon Egan's Stuff Seven team of the season.

Position	Player
GA	Te Paea Selby-Rickit
WA	Gina Crampton
