= Nathaniel Otley =

New Zealand composer, violinist and conductor

Nathaniel Otley (born 1996 or 1997) is a New Zealand composer, violinist and conductor.

== Biography ==
Otley began playing the violin at the age of four. He attended King's High School in Dunedin where he won an Otago Daily Times Class Act in 2015. He graduated from the University of Otago with a MusB (Hons) in performance violin and music composition. He played the violin in the Dunedin Symphony Orchestra, conducted the Dunedin Youth Orchestra and played and sang in several orchestras and choirs.

In 2020 Otley won a Fulbright General Graduate Award to study for a Masters of Arts in Musical Composition at the Eastman School of Music in Rochester.

== Awards ==
Otley has won three prizes in the Lilburn Trust Student Composition Awards: in 2016 he won the performance prize with his piece Concert Piece and in 2019 the composition and performance prizes for Recalibration. In 2019 Otley won the New Zealand Symphony Orchestra's Young Composers Award with his orchestral work Biosphere Degradation.

In 2024 he won the SOUNZ Contemporary Award (Te Tohu Auaha) at the APRA awards for his composition the convergence of oceans. The piece, which is a reflection on the oceans surrounding New Zealand, was composed during his tenure as the composer in residence with the National Youth Orchestra in 2023.

== Personal life ==
Otley is married to New Zealand composer Ihlara McIndoe.
