= Jean Ross (academic) =

Professor at Otago Polytechnic in New Zealand

- Born: Wales
- Awards: Peter Snow Memorial Award

Academic background
- Education: Holyhead High School, Massey University, Victoria University of Wellington, University of Otago
- Theses: Role Identification: an Impediment to Effective Core Primary Health Care Teamwork? (2001); 'Place' Matters to Rural Nurses: A Study Located in the Rural Otago Region of New Zealand (2017)
- Doctoral advisor: Etienne Louis Nel, Marie Crowe
- Other advisors: Alison Dixon, Les Toop

Jean Ross is a Welsh–New Zealand registered nurse, author and academic, and is a full professor at the Otago Polytechnic, specialising in rural nursing, nurse education and rural health. She has worked in rural nursing for more than thirty years, and in 2008 she won the Peter Snow Memorial Award for her contribution to rural health care.

== Academic career ==
Ross is originally from Wales, and trained as a nurse. She moved to New Zealand in 1991. Ross earned a master's degree at Victoria University of Wellington in 2001. Ross completed a PhD titled 'Place' Matters to Rural Nurses: A Study Located in the Rural Otago Region of New Zealand at the University of Otago in 2017.

Ross has worked in rural nursing for more than thirty years. From 1994 until 2003, Ross was co-director of the National Centre for Rural Health, through which she developed a postgraduate diploma in primary rural healthcare, and led research projects. As of 2024 Ross is on the faculty of the Otago Polytechnic, rising to associate professor in 2018 and full professor in 2022. The theme of her inaugural professorial lecture was communities of place and of interest, and how she had contributed to them, and their impact on her work. Ross is the editor-in-chief of Te Pukenga School of Nursing Online Journal.

Ross has published three edited books. In 2008, Rural Nursing: Aspects of Practice was the first New Zealand rural text book. Stories of Nursing in Rural Aotearoa – A Landscape of Care with Josie Crawley was published in 2019, and Rural Landscapes of Community Health: The Community Health Assessment Sustainable Education (CHASE) Model in Action in 2023.

In 2008 the Rural General Practice Network awarded Ross the Peter Snow Memorial Award, "in recognition of her national contribution to rural health care".

== Selected works ==
- Ross, Jean (1999). "The development of the advanced role of rural nurses in New Zealand". Australian Journal of Rural Health. 7 (4): 253–257. doi:10.1046/j.1440-1584.1999.00246.x. PMID 10732517. Wikidata Q40772450.
- Emma Collins; Ross, Jean; Josephine Crawley; Raeleen Thompson (2017). "An undergraduate educational model for developing sustainable nursing practice: A New Zealand perspective". Nurse Education Today. 61: 264–268. doi:10.1016/j.nedt.2017.12.012. PMID 29275126. Wikidata Q47185909.
- Lis Heath; Egan, Richard; Ross, Jean; Iosua, Ella Elizabeth; Robert Walker; Rod MacLeod (2021). "Preparing nurses for palliative and end of life care: A survey of New Zealand nursing schools". Nurse Education Today. 100 104822. doi:10.1016/j.nedt.2021.104822. PMID 33705968. Wikidata Q130333535.
- Lis Ellen Latta; Ross, Jean (2011). "Exploring the impact of palliative care education for care assistants employed in residential aged care facilities in Otago, New Zealand". SITES: a Journal for South Pacific Cultural Studies. 7 (2): 30–52. doi:10.11157/sites-vol7iss2id155. Wikidata Q130333536.
- Ross, Jean (1999). "The development of the advanced role of rural nurses in New Zealand". Australian Journal of Rural Health. 7 (4): 253–257. doi:10.1046/j.1440-1584.1999.00246.x. PMID 10732517. Wikidata Q40772450.
- Ross, J., ed. (2 September 2008). Rural Nursing: Aspects of Practice (Report). Dunedin: Rural Health Opportunities. ISBN 978-0-473-13351-1.
- Ross, Jean; Crawley, Josie; Mahoney, Laurie (November 2017). "Sustainable community development: Student nurses making a difference". Scope: Contemporary Research Topics (Learning & Teaching) (4): 8–17.
- Ross, Jean; Mann, Samuel; Whiddon, Keith, eds. (2023). Rural Landscapes of Community Health: The Community Health Assessment Sustainable Education (CHASE) Model in Action. Global Perspectives on Health Geography. Springer. ISBN 978-3-031-43200-2.
