= New Zealand Symphony Orchestra =

National symphony orchestra of New Zealand

- Orchestra
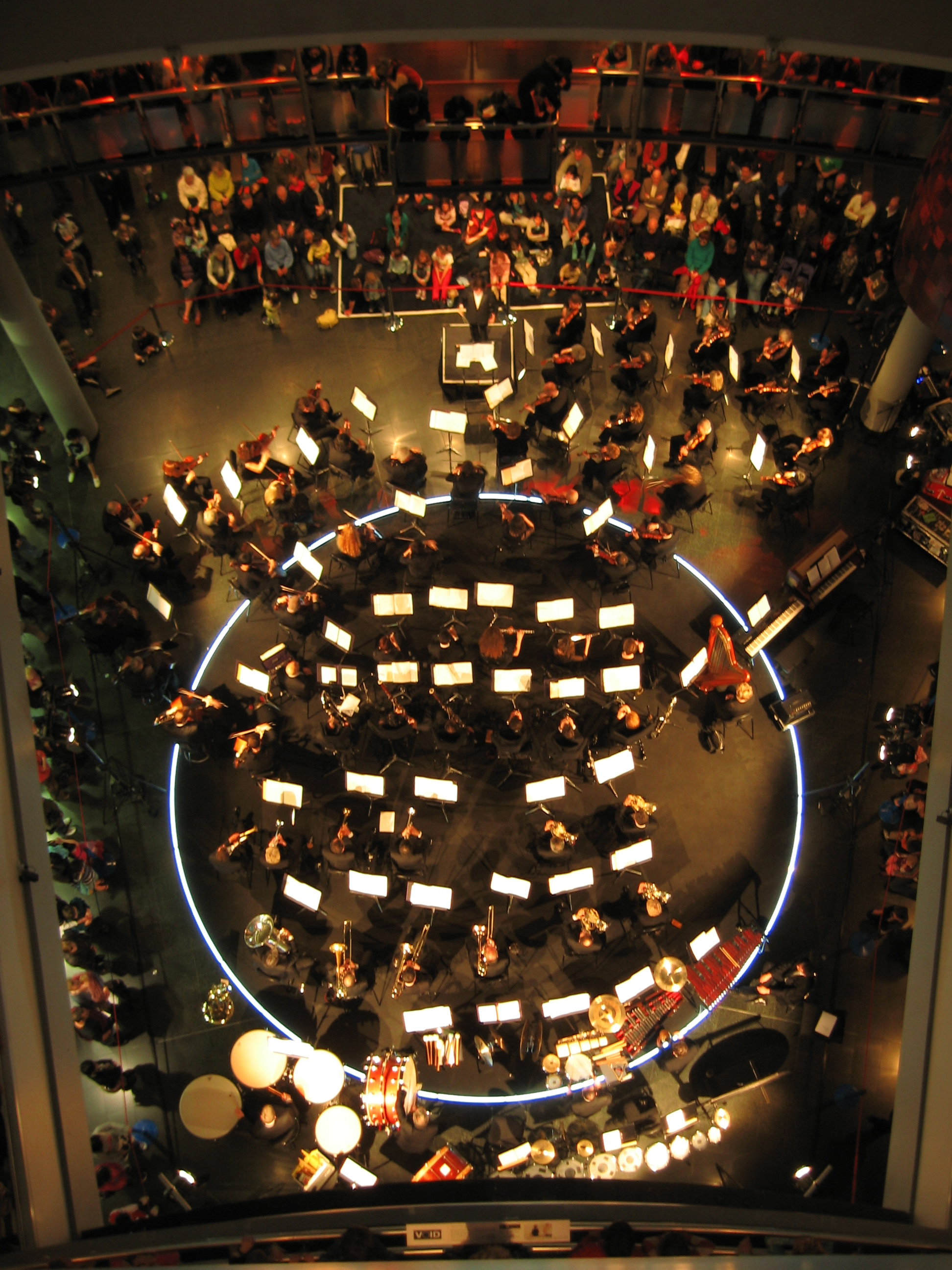
- NZSO playing at Te Papa in 2009
- Native name: Te Tira Pūoro o Aotearoa
- Former name: National Orchestra of the New Zealand Broadcasting Service (1946–1963); NZBC Symphony Orchestra (1963–1975)
- Founded: 1946; 80 years ago
- Location: New Zealand
- Concert hall: Michael Fowler Centre
- Principal conductor: Gemma New (2022)
- Website: www.nzso.co.nz

The New Zealand Symphony Orchestra (NZSO) (Māori: Te Tira Pūoro o Aotearoa) is a symphony orchestra based in Wellington, New Zealand. The national orchestra of New Zealand, the NZSO is an autonomous Crown entity owned by the New Zealand Government, per the New Zealand Symphony Orchestra Act 2004. It is currently based in the Michael Fowler Centre and frequently performed in the adjacent Wellington Town Hall before it was closed in 2013. It also performs in Auckland, Christchurch and Dunedin.

== History ==
A national orchestra for New Zealand was first proposed with the founding of the Radio Broadcasting Company in 1925, and broadcasting studio orchestras operated in major cities from the late 1920s. A national orchestra was formed in 1939 for New Zealand's Centennial Exhibition in 1940.

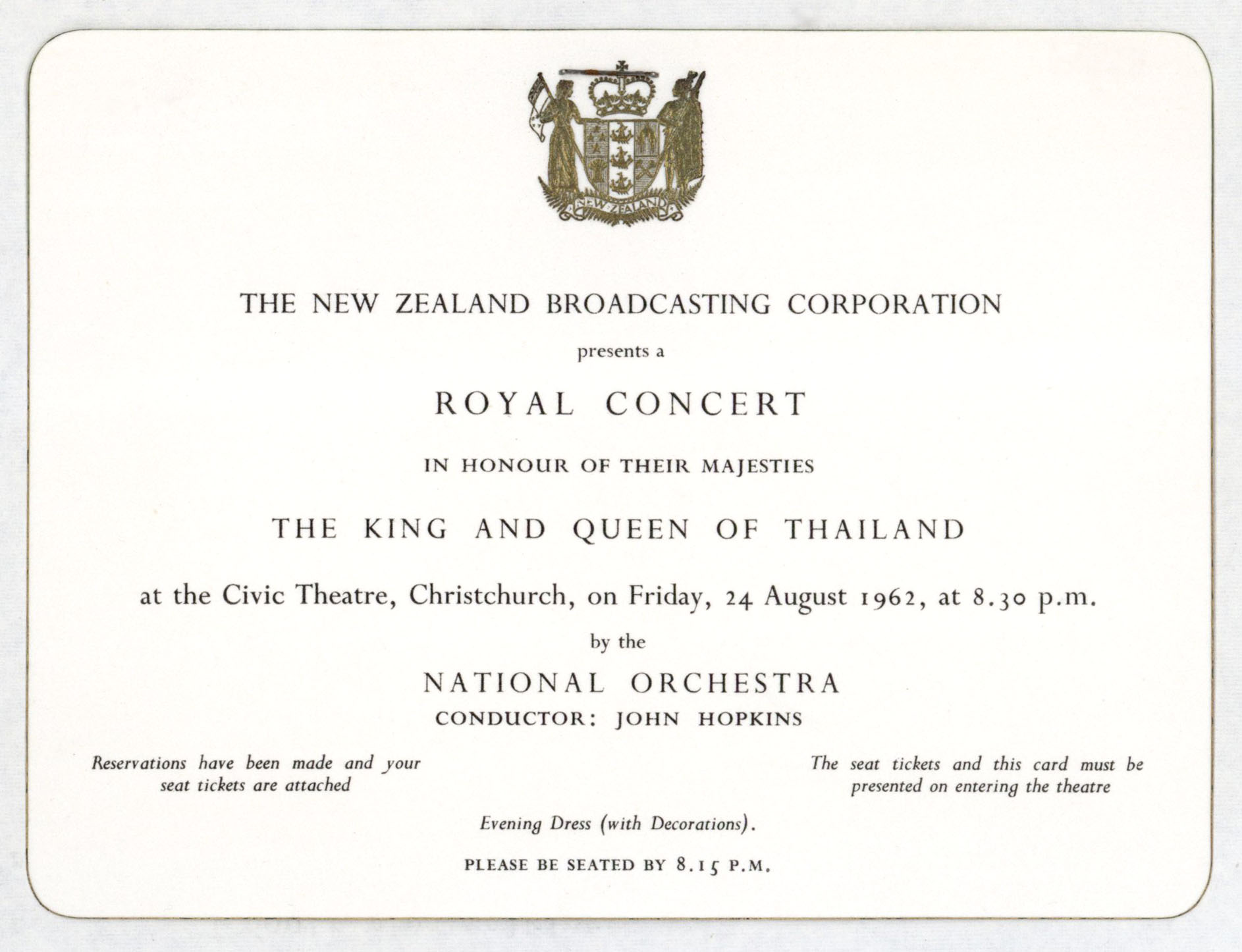
NZBC National Orchestra invitation card, August 1962

The orchestra became permanent in 1946 in the aftermath of World War II as the "National Orchestra of the New Zealand Broadcasting Service" (by Oswald Cheesman and others); the inaugural concert took place on 6 March 1947. It was managed as a department of the New Zealand Broadcasting Corporation, which later became Radio New Zealand, as the NZBC National Orchestra. In 1961, Igor Stravinsky and his associate conductor Robert Craft conducted the orchestra in a programme of Stravinsky's works.

The orchestra was renamed the NZBC Symphony Orchestra in 1963, and in 1975 renamed again to the New Zealand Symphony Orchestra. In 1988, the orchestra became fully independent of Radio New Zealand, and began operating as an independent Crown-owned company. Even after the formal separation of the orchestra from Radio New Zealand, NZSO performances continue to be recorded, broadcast and archived by Radio New Zealand Concert. Auckland Town Hall, Wellington Town Hall and Michael Fowler Centre performances are broadcast live-to-air and streamed online, and performances in other centres or overseas cities are usually recorded and broadcast at later dates.

On 11 September 2022, the orchestra performed a special 75th anniversary concert (delayed from the actual anniversary by the COVID-19 pandemic), conducted by Gemma New.

== Performances ==
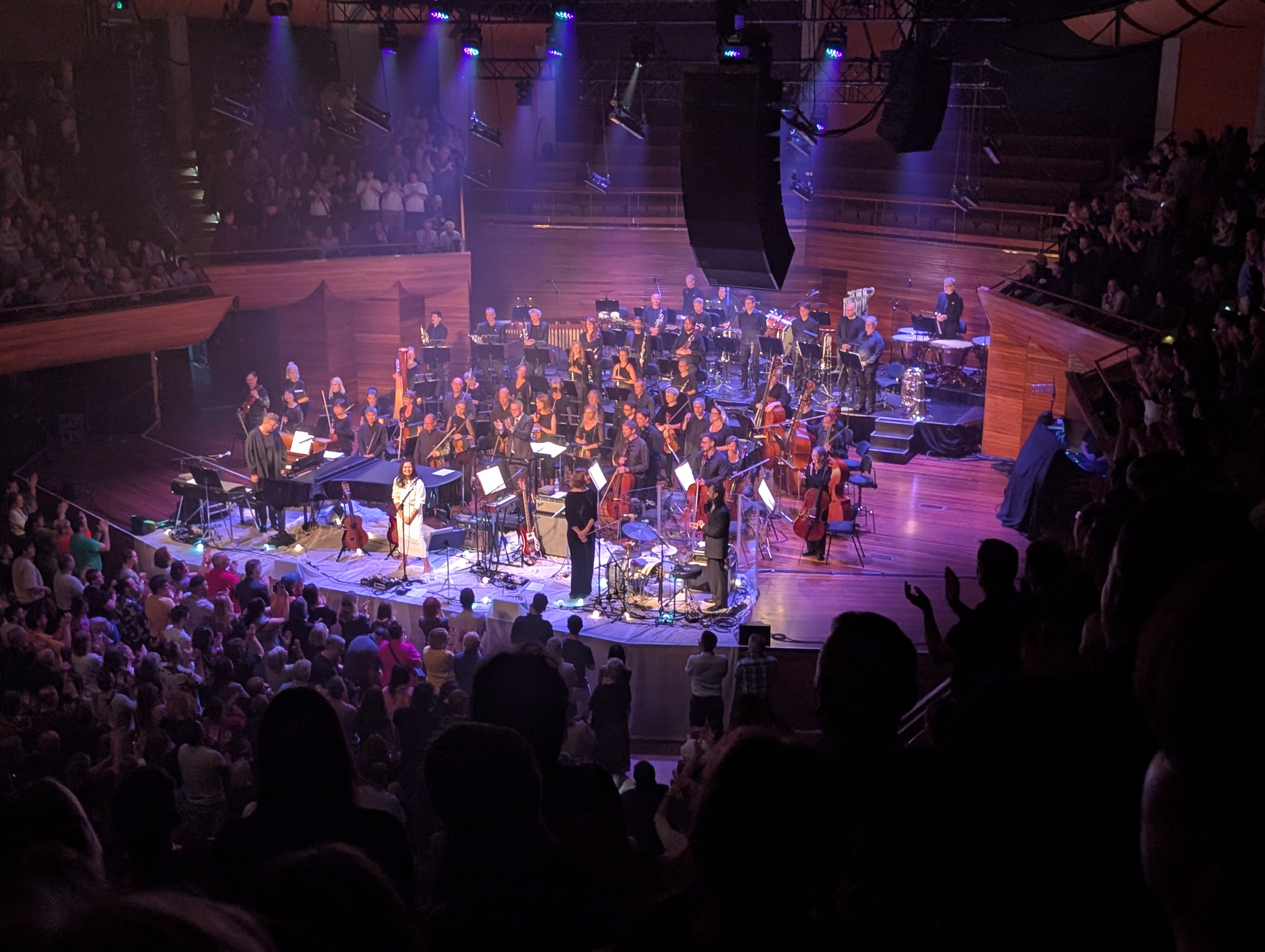
Bic Runga performing with the NZSO, Wellington, April 2026

=== Touring ===
The NZSO has long had an extensive touring schedule within New Zealand. It performed in Christchurch as early as 1947. It performs its core series of 12 programmes in Wellington and Auckland, about half of those in Hamilton, Christchurch and Dunedin, and visits several provincial cities each year. It has several times toured overseas, notably in 2005 to the BBC Proms, the Snape Maltings, the Concertgebouw in Amsterdam and the World Expo at Aichi in Japan.

=== Conductors ===
Franz-Paul Decker was the last NZSO conductor to have the title of chief conductor, and had the title of conductor laureate until his death in May 2014. The first conductor to have the title of music director of the NZSO was James Judd, from 1999 to 2007. Judd is now the orchestra's music director emeritus.

In May 2007, Pietari Inkinen was named the NZSO's second music director, and he formally took up the post in January 2008. Inkinen concluded his NZSO tenure in 2015 and subsequently took the title of honorary conductor. In June 2015, the NZSO announced the appointment of Edo de Waart as its next music director, with his first concerts in March 2016. De Waart's last concert as music director was in November 2019. In 2020 he became NZSO conductor laureate. NZSO associate conductor Hamish McKeich was appointed NZSO Principal Conductor in Residence from January 2020.

In 2022, the NZSO appointed Gemma New as its artistic director and principal conductor in 2022, the first woman to hold leadership conducting posts with the NZSO. She is scheduled to stand down from the posts in 2027, and subsequently to take the title of artistic partner.

In August 2023, André de Ridder first guest-conducted the NZSO. In June 2025, the NZSO announced the appointment of de Ridder as its next music director, effective in 2027.

==== List of affiliated conductors ====
- Anderson Tyrer (1947–1950)
- Michael Bowles (1950–1953)
- Warwick Braithwaite (1953–1954)
- James Robertson (1954–1957)
- John Hopkins (1957–1963)
- Juan Matteucci (1964–1969)
- Franz-Paul Decker (1991–1996, chief conductor)
- James Judd (1999–2007, music director)
- Pietari Inkinen (2008–2015, music director)
- Edo de Waart (2016–2019, music director)
- Hamish McKeich (2016–2019, associate conductor; 2020–present, principal conductor in residence)
- Gemma New (2022–present, principal conductor and artistic director)

=== Recordings ===
The NZSO has recorded several LPs and many CDs, several with internationally known soloists such as Alessandra Marc and Donald McIntyre. In the decade up to 2007 it sold 500,000 CDs. It records at least one CD of New Zealand music each year. It has made a number of recordings on the American Koch label and recorded regularly with Naxos including two CDs of music by Jean Sibelius and one CD of music by Einojuhani Rautavaara.

From 2011 the orchestra collaborated with SOUNZ on the New Zealand Composer Sessions which at its inception in 1998 was known as the NZSO-SOUNZ Readings. The NZSO workshopped and played works by emerging and established composers which were then recorded by RNZ.

In 2012, the NZSO collaborated with Booktrack and Salman Rushdie to create music for an enhanced edition of Rusdhie's short story In the South. The NZSO recorded part of Howard Shore's score for The Lord of the Rings: The Fellowship of the Ring, notably the "Mines of Moria" sequence, as well as an alternate version of the cue "The Breaking of the Fellowship". The NZSO also performed and recorded Howard Shore's score for The Hobbit: The Desolation of Smaug and The Hobbit: The Battle of the Five Armies, and most recently Mark Mothersbaugh's score for A Minecraft Movie.

An NZSO recording of works by Zhou Long and the Symphony 'Humen 1839', written in collaboration with compatriot Chen Yi, was nominated for Best Orchestral Performance at the 58th Annual Grammy Awards in February 2016. Singaporean Darrell Ang conducted the recording, which was recorded in Wellington's Michael Fowler Centre in June 2013 and released on the Naxos label in May 2015. It was the first Grammy nomination for the NZSO.

In 2020, the NZSO collaborated with composer Claire Cowan to produce a recording of the music from the original ballet "Hansel and Gretel", a commission from The Royal New Zealand Ballet. The album won the 2021 Aotearoa Music Award for Best Classical Album.

== Subsidiary orchestras ==
=== National Youth Orchestra ===
The NZSO National Youth Orchestra was founded by John Hopkins in 1959. It auditions afresh each year and, after an intensive rehearsal schedule, performs one programme, in 2007 to be repeated in Auckland, Wellington and Christchurch.

The NYO celebrated its 50th Anniversary Celebratory Season in 2009, under the baton of Paul Daniel, with John Chen as soloist and Ben Morrison as concertmaster. Their programme was Mahler's 7th Symphony, Ravel's Left-Hand piano concerto and an original composition by Natalie Hunt, Only to the Highest Mountain. The 2009 season also saw the return of John Hopkins to join in the celebrations.

National Youth Orchestra Composer-in-Residence scheme

In 2005, the orchestra inaugurated its composer-in-residence scheme, with Robin Toan as first recipient of the award.

List of recipients

- 2005 Robin Toan
- 2006 Claire Cowan
- 2007 Karlo Margetić
- 2008 Tabea Squire
- 2009 Natalie Hunt
- 2011 Alexandra Hay
- 2012 Alex Taylor
- 2013 Sam Logan
- 2014 Sarah Ballard
- 2015 Salina Fisher
- 2016 Celeste Oram
- 2017 Reuben Jelleyman
- 2018 Josiah Carr
- 2019 Glen Downie
- 2020 Joshua Pearson
- 2021 Ihlara McIndoe
- 2022 David Mason
- 2023 Nathaniel Otley
- 2024 Jessie Leov
- 2025 Luka Venter

=== New Zealand Chamber Orchestra ===
The New Zealand Chamber Orchestra was founded in 1987 by NZSO violinist Stephen Managh, its first leader, and comprises members of the NZSO. Later renamed the NZSO Chamber Orchestra, they toured and recorded extensively for 13 years. They generally performed without a conductor under the direction of their first violinist and Musical Director Donald Armstrong. They are not currently performing.

== See also ==
- Orchestra Wellington
