= Kelso, New Zealand =

Historic settlement in Otago, New Zealand

Coordinates: 45°54′S 169°14′E

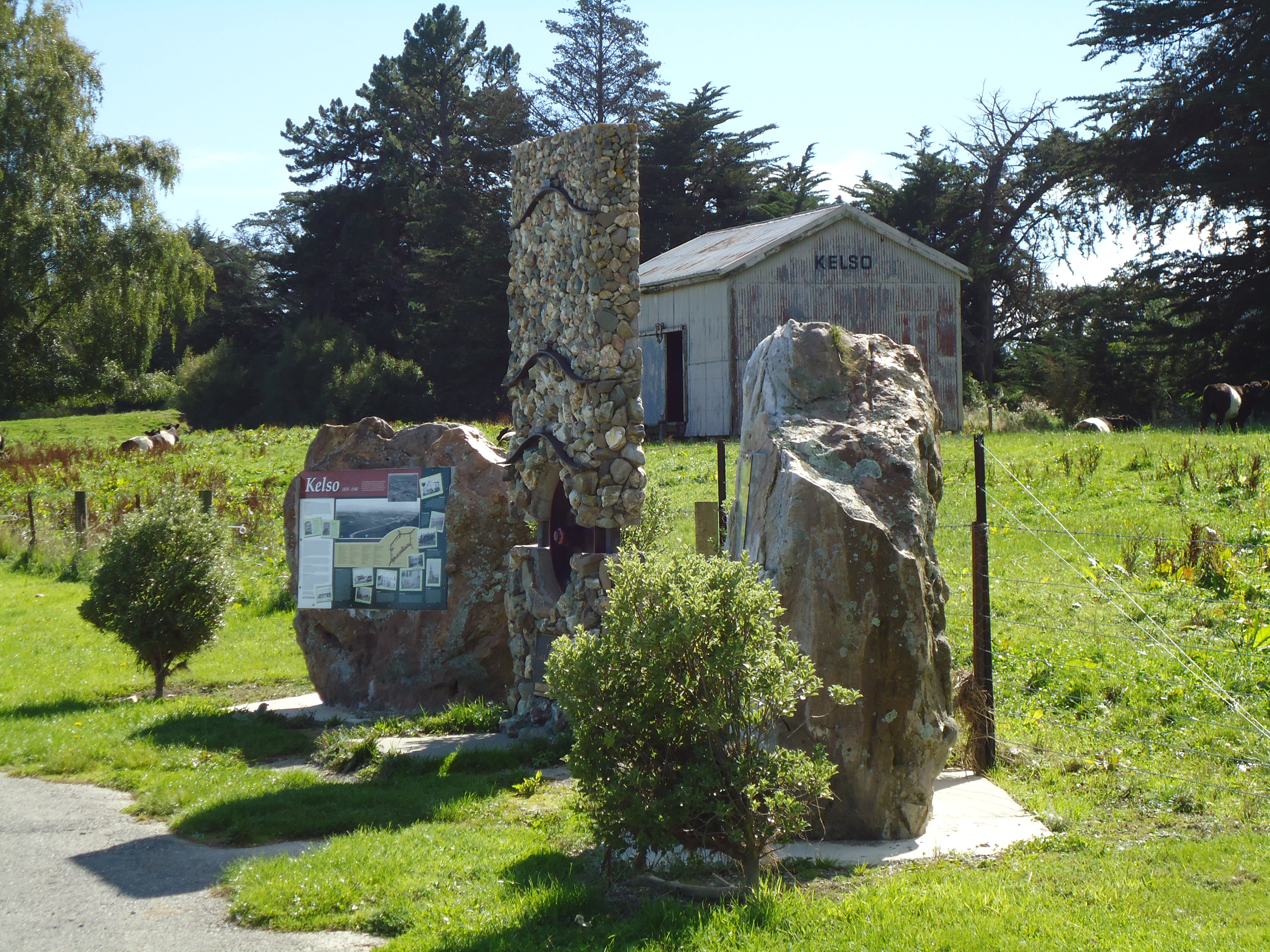
The Kelso Monument, showing flood levels; an old railway shed in the background

Kelso is a former town in Otago, New Zealand, located ten kilometres north of Tapanui on the Crookston Burn, close to its junction with the larger Pomahaka River. The town was abandoned in the 1980s after two large floods inundated the settlement.

== Etymology ==
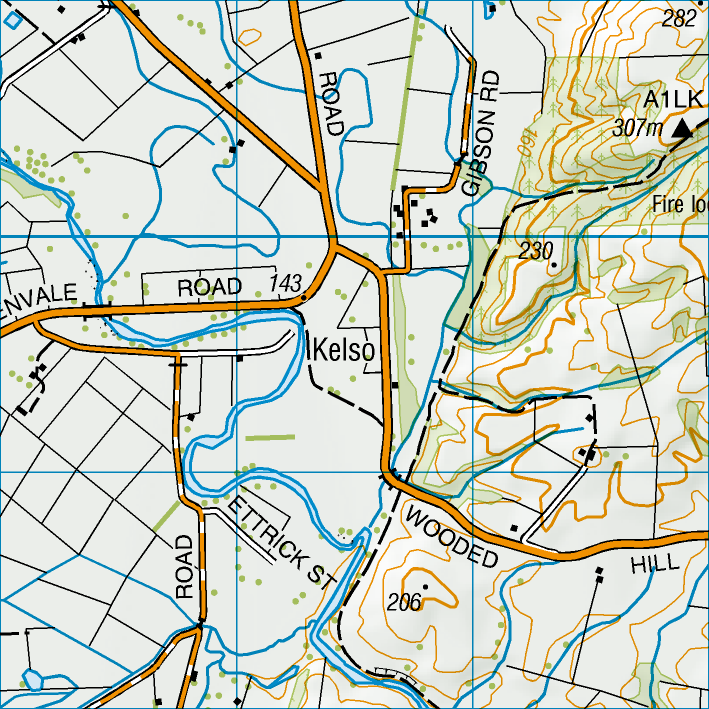
Topographic map of Kelso

Kelso was named by John Turnbull Thomson for the Scottish home town of one of the town's first settlers, James Logan.

== History ==
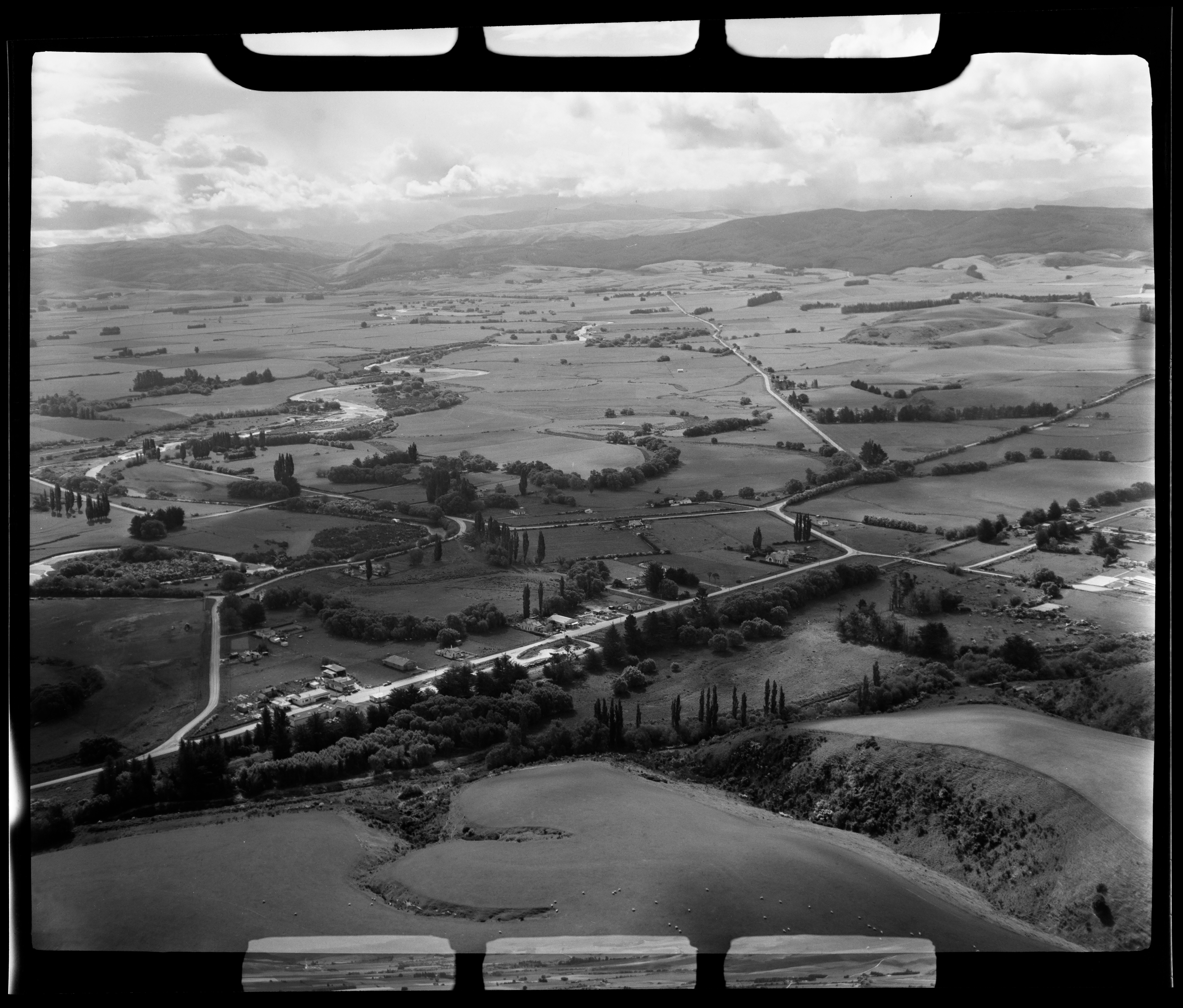
1956 aerial view of Kelso

Kelso was established in 1878 by the Pomahaka River. Kelso was intended to be the main settlement in the wider area. Among the area's early settlers was Charles McDonald, who arrived in the 1860s and established a farm named Glencoe in the district. His daughter Mary is recorded as the first European child born and registered in the Heriot-Kelso area.

In 1932 the Kelso hall was opened. The West Otago Agricultural and Pastoral show was held in Kelso.

In the 1970s Kelso had a school, hall, post office, railway station and a stock and station agency. The population of Kelso was small however, with twelve families in Kelso and five living on the 'Terrace'. The Terrace was an elevated part of the town and location of the school.

== Flooding ==
Located on a flat by the Pomahaka River and Heriot and Crookston burns flooding is a common occurrence in Kelso. Between 1881 and 1980 it is estimated to have flooded 300 times.

The first large flood in Kelso occurred in 1917.

In October 1978 flooding in the region caused serious damage in Kelso with waters reaching up to 2.5 m (8 ft 2 in) high, exceeding the 1917 flood. All 38 residents were evacuated with no fatalities, although there were stock losses. Some residents left Kelso after the flood but many rebuilt and repaired their homes the following year. The Tuapeka County Council rezoned the land to rural to prevent new constructions but this was overturned after a legal challenge. Residents petitioned the Otago Catchment Board to institute flood control measures. Previous proposals in the 1960s were not advanced. Ultimately no measure was implemented before the second flood.

A subsequent flood in January 1980 was at least 3.5 m (11 ft) high. Greater rainfall fell upon the town beginning on the 16th with rainfall coming from the Dunrobin and Blue Mountain catchments in addition to the Pomahaka, Waikaka, and Waikaia catchments. The following day a state of emergency was declared. Some residents refused to be evacuated at first and had to be rescued via helicopter.

Previous flooding in Kelso had caused little damage, where as the two larger floods had killed large amounts of livestock and caused serious damage to property. Most residents had left Kelso, either by choice or due to not having any accommodation. Just two families lived in the town. The school and some businesses continued to operate after the flood. The Tuapeka County Council wished to enforce the previous construction ban and held a meeting with MP Warren Cooper. Insurance companies refused to insure Kelso after the second flood, the first time in New Zealand insurance had been refused for a particular settlement. Some residents considered the government valuation for their properties was so little that it would leave them bankrupt. Many residents did not ensure for flood damage due to claims from insurance brokers that the Earthquake and War Damage Commission would cover flooding — the commission refused to pay out for flood damage considering the damage was not 'abnormal or unforeseen'. The commission was taken to court and a judge ruled it was to pay out to the residents for the flood.

The government agreed to release $170,000 from a relief fund for the 1978 flood to help Kelso residents relocate. Due in part to bureaucratic confusion on who was to administer the relief many residents were unable to access the fund for months after it had been promised. Some homes were relocated to Tapanui and Heriot and others were demolished. Some residents built new homes in Glenkenich but others left the region entirely, with many settling in Dunedin. After the relocations scant trace of the town remained, with all the businesses, school, and showgrounds closed.

As of 2022 little remains to indicate the location of Kelso, other than a stone memorial and an old railway shed. The rest of the land is now pasture.

A book of the history of Kelso was written by May Brownlie, titled Kismet for Kelso (published 1992).
