= St Hilda's Collegiate School =

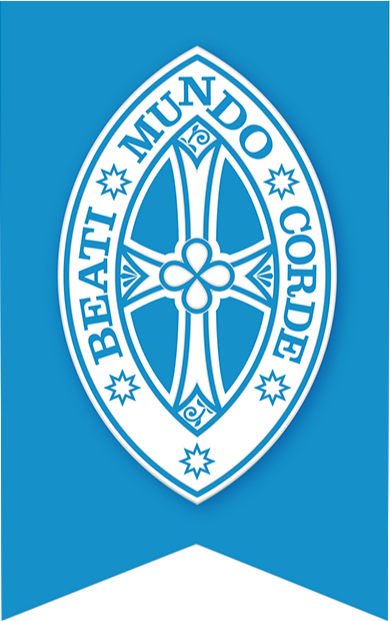

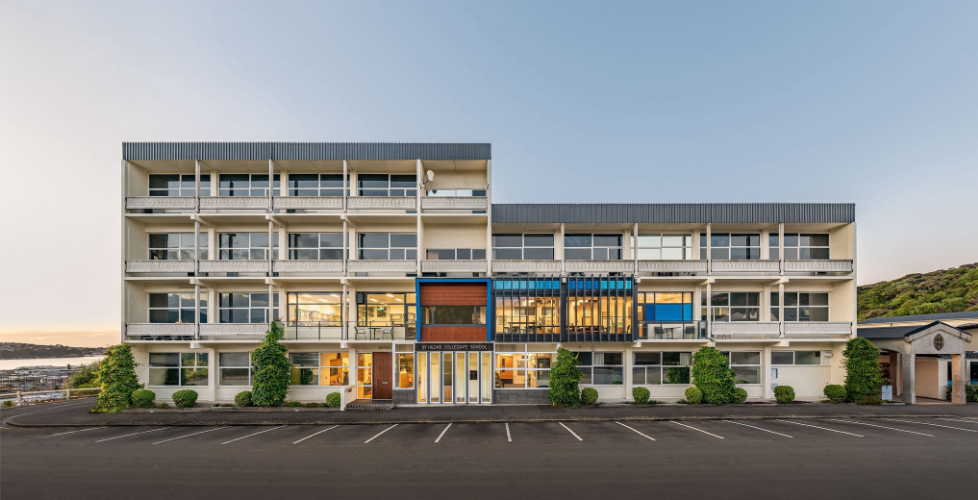
- Main building facing Cobden Street

Location
- 2 Cobden Street, Dunedin, Otago; 9016; New Zealand; 45°52′02″S 170°30′12″E

Information
- Other names: Te Kura o Hira Tapu
- Type: State-integrated, Day with boarding facilities
- Motto: Latin: Beati Mundo Corde (Blessed are the Pure in Heart)
- Denomination: Anglican
- Patron saint: Saint Hilda
- Established: 1896; 130 years ago
- Founder: Bishop Samuel Tarratt Nevill
- Sister school: Perth College (Western Australia), St Michael’s Collegiate, St Michael’s Grammar School, St Peter’s Girls’ School, St Margaret's College, Christchurch, St Hilda's Anglican School for Girls
- Ministry of Education Institution no.: 380
- Principal: Ms Nicky Whitham-Blackwell
- Chaplain: Dr Gillian Townsley
- Staff: 64
- Teaching staff: 36
- Years offered: 7–13
- Gender: Girls
- Age range: 11-18
- Enrolment: 461 (July 2026)
- Average class size: Approx. 20-24
- Classes offered: Subjects may vary on year level. English, Health Education, Financial Mathematics, Calculus, Statistics and Modelling, Physical Education, Religious Education, Commerce, Business Studies, Economics, Geography, History, Biology, Physics, Chemistry, Design and Visual Communication, Digital Technologies, French, Music, Drama, Dance, Spanish, Te Reo Māori, Textiles, Painting, Photography, Food and Nutrition, Media Studies
- Language: English
- Hours in school day: 8:40pm–3:00pm
- Houses: Aston (yellow), Bentham (green), Richards (red), Thomson (blue)
- Color: Hex Code: 2598CE – Bright Blue
- Socio-economic decile: 10
- Website: www.shcs.school.nz

St Hilda's Collegiate School (SHCS) is a secondary school for girls in Dunedin, New Zealand.

== History ==
=== Foundation ===
Founded as an Anglican school in 1896 by the first bishop of Dunedin, Bishop Samuel Nevill and staffed by the Sisters of the Church. The sisters ran the school until 1931; when they were recalled back to England. The first lay Principal of St Hilda’s Collegiate School was Miss Dorothy Blackmore. St Hilda's is the only school of the Anglican Diocese of Dunedin. It is integrated into the New Zealand state school system.

It has a roll of approximately 450 girls with around one third of the school being boarders from both around New Zealand and overseas. The school is named after Saint Hilda, a 7th-century English abbess remembered for the influential role she played in the Synod of Whitby. Saint Hilda is considered one of the patron saints of learning and culture, including poetry.

At its inception, St Hilda's was situated at The Grange, the former home of John Hyde Harris. However the school roll grew, leading to St Hilda's Collegiate School relocating to the current site in 1900, bounded by Cobden Street, Heriot Row and Royal Terrace. During its initial years, St Hilda's provided education from kindergarten to senior school, and boys were able to attend the junior school.

=== 21st Century ===
The original buildings of St Hilda's have since been demolished, and the school campus redeveloped from the mid 20th century. Some of the buildings at St Hilda's were designed by Ted McCoy; the Chapel, Library, and Whitby redevelopment, alongside Te Waka Huia, were designed by Dwelling Architectural Design.

In 2019, Te Waka Huia — also known as The Visual and Performing Arts Centre — was completed, winning the Architectural Designers of New Zealand (ADNZ) commercial/industrial award in 2020.

The new uniform was introduced in 2022.

2023 saw the Chapel, Library, and Whitby [cafeteria hall] renovations completed – which officially opened in February of 2024 – alongside the introduction of the new house names; Aston, Bentham, Richards, and Thomson. The current Chapel includes copies of the original stain glass windows from the first Chapel.

In 2026, renovations started targeting the third floor laboratories, the semi-enclosed west stairs, and the roof; alongside the addition of a lift to access the fourth floor.

== Enrolment ==
As a state-integrated school, St Hilda's Collegiate School charges New Zealand-resident students compulsory attendance dues plus requests voluntary donations. For the 2025 school year, the attendance dues payable is $2,472.50 per year while the requested donation is $1,620 per year.

As of July 2026, the school has roll of 461 students, of which 58 (12.6%) identify as Māori.

As of 2026, the school has an Equity Index of 394, placing it amongst schools whose students have fewest socioeconomic barriers to achievement (roughly equivalent to deciles 9 and 10 under the former socio-economic decile system).

== Notable alumnae ==
- Georgia and Kate Heffernan – New Zealand netball internationals.
- Fiona J. McDonald – graduate
- Ihlara McIndoe – composer
- Frances Ross – New Zealand school principal
- Louise Petherbridge – actor and director

== Notable staff ==
- Bessie Te Wenerau Grace – teacher and education leader
- Jackie Barron – principal 2015–2026
