= Landslip Hill =

Coordinates: 46°04′S 169°10′E

Landslip Hill is located on the boundary of Southland and Otago, in the South Island of New Zealand, between Tapanui and Pukerau. It is a debris flow feature associated with the Manuherikia Group of fluvial quartz sandstones. Geologists have described the fossil-bearing rocks as forming part of a sequence of "siliclastic fluvial deltaic sands, conglomerates and silty clays".

== Fossil beds ==
The formation is well known to botanists for its prominent plant fossils of Late Oligocene to Miocene age. The first collection was made at Landslip Hill in 1862 while Sir James Hector was the director of the Geological Survey of Otago. Hector returned to the Landslip Hill deposit in 1869 to make further collections, and in 1884 he proposed the name 'Landslip Hill beds' for the quartz arenite, which is now regarded as being related to the Gore Formation following the work of Lindqvist (1983) and Pocknall (1982). "The plant remains include uncompressed three-dimensional logs, stems, roots and rootlets, and a variety of fruits, some of which can be assigned to modern New Zealand taxa, and others which are no longer present in the local flora". Recent finds include fossils of the genus Casuarina.

== Claims of impact origin ==
Some have claimed that Landslip Hill is an impact crater; but reliable sources categorically deny this. Duncan Steel, of the Anglo-Australian Observatory and the University of Adelaide, has suggested that the feature is the remnant of a bolide (asteroid or comet) impact that occurred about 1200 CE. Steel supports his hypothesis with a Māori lament that, he claims, centers on raging fires from the sky, accompanied by tempestuous winds and upheavals in the earth. Others have described the feature as "600 by 900 meters wide and 130 meters deep, and surrounded by a zone of fallen trees, 40 to 80 kilometers wide, dating from eight centuries ago".

However, James Goff, Keri Hulme and Bruce McFadgen, after considering the arguments put forward by Steel and others, find 'no evidence, either Maori or geological, for a 15th-century meteor impact in New Zealand'. They make the point that 'invoking legends or particular translations of Maori place-names to "fit" a known event must be undertaken with considerable care and suitable provisos', and characterise this type of reasoning as 'attempts to creatively rewrite New Zealand's cultural and tectonic past'. They also deal with the Māori lament quoted in Steel & Snow, disputing both his translation and his interpretation. (Note: Steel and Snow quote three lines from a Māori lament and offer translations of local placenames, suggesting these are connected to the impact event, but offer no explanation of how they arrived at these conclusions; notably, they fail to explain how a lament that was composed on the death of a 19th-century North Island chief could possibly relate to the so-called Tapanui crater. Verschuur claims that Otarehua is a placename near Tapanui and that it refers to the Māori name for Antares, and that this may be an indication that the bolide impact happened in the June Taurid meteor stream. However, Goff et al. (2003) provide refutations of these translations; they specifically mention Otarehua.)
