= Blue Mountains (New Zealand) =

Mountain range in Clutha District, New Zealand

Coordinates: 45°56′S 169°23′E

The Blue Mountains are a range of rugged hills in West Otago, in southern New Zealand. They form a barrier between the valleys of the Clutha and Pomahaka Rivers. They lie between the towns of Tapanui and Lawrence and rise to 1019 metres (3280 ft).

The Blue Mountains are home to one of the largest herds of wild fallow deer in the south island of New Zealand, hunting is permitted on Department of Conservation administered land. The early name for the range was Te Papanui, which was later corrupted to Tapanui. Early surveyors named it Mount Valpy after William Henry Valpy, an early settler in Dunedin. The name Blue Mountains was given by gold diggers during the Otago gold rush in the early 1860s after the Blue Mountains in New South Wales.
