= Heriot, New Zealand =

Heriot
- Rural settlement
- Interactive map of Heriot
- Coordinates: 45°50′S 169°16′E
- Country: New Zealand
- Region: Otago
- Territorial authority: Clutha District
- Ward: West Otago
- Community: West Otago
- Electorates: Southland; Te Tai Tonga (Māori)

Government
  - Territorial authority: Clutha District Council
  - Regional council: Otago Regional Council
  - Mayor of Clutha: Jock Martin
  - Southland MP: Joseph Mooney
  - Te Tai Tonga MP: Tākuta Ferris

Area
  - Total: 15.73 km^{2} (6.07 sq mi)

Population (2018 Census)
  - Total: 111
  - Density: 7.06/km^{2} (18.3/sq mi)
- Time zone: UTC+12 (NZST)
- Postcode: 9522
- Local iwi: Ngāi Tahu

Heriot is a small settlement in West Otago, in the South Island of New Zealand. It is located 20 kilometres southwest of Raes Junction and 15 kilometres north of Tapanui.

The township is likely not to have been named after the Scottish border town of Heriot (unlike other local towns named after Borders places, such as Kelso and Roxburgh), but may have been named from the maiden name of the wife of early settler William Pinkerton.

The main economic activities in Heriot are related to livestock and forestry.

== Demographics ==
Heriot covers 15.73 km^{2} (6.07 sq mi), and is part of the larger West Otago statistical area.

Historical population
Year	Pop.	±% p.a.
2006	141	—
2013	129	−1.26%
2018	111	−2.96%

Heriot had a population of 111 at the 2018 New Zealand census, a decrease of 18 people (−14.0%) since the 2013 census, and a decrease of 30 people (−21.3%) since the 2006 census. There were 51 households, comprising 57 males and 54 females, giving a sex ratio of 1.06 males per female. The median age was 39.8 years (compared with 37.4 years nationally), with 24 people (21.6%) aged under 15 years, 21 (18.9%) aged 15 to 29, 48 (43.2%) aged 30 to 64, and 18 (16.2%) aged 65 or older.

Ethnicities were 91.9% European/Pākehā, 13.5% Māori, and 2.7% other ethnicities. People may identify with more than one ethnicity.

Although some people chose not to answer the census's question about religious affiliation, 48.6% had no religion, 40.5% were Christian, and 2.7% had Māori religious beliefs.

Of those at least 15 years old, 9 (10.3%) people had a bachelor's or higher degree, and 21 (24.1%) people had no formal qualifications. The median income was $31,100, compared with $31,800 nationally. 9 people (10.3%) earned over $70,000 compared to 17.2% nationally. The employment status of those at least 15 was that 54 (62.1%) people were employed full-time, and 12 (13.8%) were part-time.

== Education ==
Heriot School is a co-educational state primary school for Year 1 to 6 students, with a roll of 64 as of July 2026. The school was established in 1879.
