= Pomahaka River =

River in New Zealand's South Island

Coordinates: 46°09′S 169°34′E

The Pomahaka River is in South Otago in New Zealand's South Island. It is a tributary of the Clutha River, flowing south for 80 kilometres (50 mi) from the Old Man Range / Kopuwai mountains to join the Clutha about 15 km west of Balclutha. Along its path it passes the Blue Mountains and the forestry town of Tapanui in the area known locally as West Otago.

For a short part of its length, the river forms the boundary between Otago and Southland regions.

Major flooding of the Pomahaka in 1978 led to the relocation of the town of Kelso and caused damage severe enough to lead to the closure of the Tapanui Branch railway.
