= Tapanui =

- Town
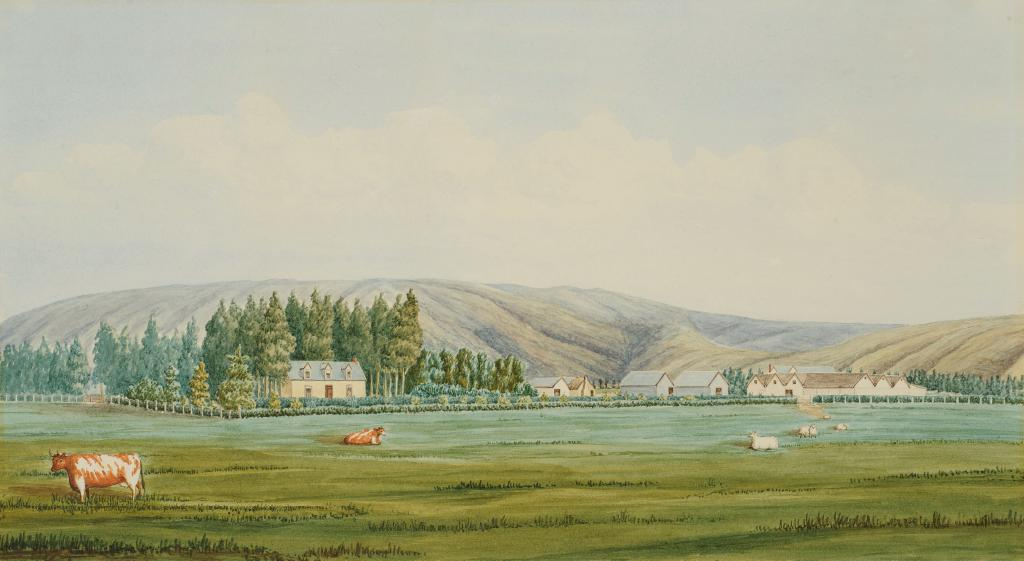
- Tapanui Homestead
- Interactive map of Tapanui
- Coordinates: 45°57′0″S 169°16′0″E
- Country: New Zealand
- Region: Otago
- Territorial authority: Clutha District
- Ward: West Otago
- Community: West Otago
- Electorates: Southland; Te Tai Tonga (Māori)

Government
  - Territorial authority: Clutha District Council
  - Regional council: Otago Regional Council
  - Mayor of Clutha: Jock Martin
  - Southland MP: Joseph Mooney
  - Te Tai Tonga MP: Tākuta Ferris

Area
  - Total: 1.97 km^{2} (0.76 sq mi)

Population (June 2025)
  - Total: 800
  - Density: 410/km^{2} (1,100/sq mi)
- Time zone: UTC+12 (NZST)
- Postcode: 9522
- Local iwi: Ngāi Tahu

Tapanui is a small town in West Otago in New Zealand's South Island, close to the boundary with Southland region.

It is a forestry town at the foot of the Blue Mountains and the Pomahaka River. Popular pastimes include deer stalking and trout fishing.

Nearby locations include Landslip Hill, a fossil-bearing geologic feature.

== History ==
For almost a hundred years, the town was serviced by the Tapanui Branch railway line, which despite its name never actually terminated in Tapanui. This line was formally opened in late 1880 and closed after being damaged by severe flooding in the region in October 1978. State Highway 90, which links State Highway 1 at McNab, near Gore, to State Highway 8 at Raes Junction, passes through Tapanui.

In 2015, Tapanui was a filming location for the Disney production Pete's Dragon, with the main street and old timber mill serving as their equivalents in the fictional town of Millhaven.

== Tapanui flu ==
In New Zealand the name Tapanui is closely associated with the mysterious ailment chronic fatigue syndrome, which — until it became an accepted ailment — was known as "Tapanui 'flu". The doctor who first documented the rise of the condition in New Zealand, Peter Snow, was based in the town.

== Demographics ==
Tapanui is described by Statistics New Zealand as a rural settlement. It covers 1.97 km^{2} (0.76 sq mi), and had an estimated population of 800 as of June 2025, with a population density of 406 people per km^{2}. It is part of the much larger West Otago statistical area.

Historical population
Year	Pop.	±% p.a.
2006	744	—
2013	723	−0.41%
2018	789	+1.76%

Tapanui had a population of 789 at the 2018 New Zealand census, an increase of 66 people (9.1%) since the 2013 census, and an increase of 45 people (6.0%) since the 2006 census. There were 351 households, comprising 381 males and 399 females, giving a sex ratio of 0.95 males per female, with 135 people (17.1%) aged under 15 years, 93 (11.8%) aged 15 to 29, 336 (42.6%) aged 30 to 64, and 219 (27.8%) aged 65 or older.

Ethnicities were 89.7% European/Pākehā, 14.8% Māori, 0.4% Pasifika, 1.5% Asian, and 3.4% other ethnicities. People may identify with more than one ethnicity.

Although some people chose not to answer the census's question about religious affiliation, 51.0% had no religion, 38.4% were Christian, 0.4% had Māori religious beliefs, 0.8% were Hindu, 0.8% were Muslim, 0.8% were Buddhist and 0.8% had other religions.

Of those at least 15 years old, 63 (9.6%) people had a bachelor's or higher degree, and 180 (27.5%) people had no formal qualifications. 51 people (7.8%) earned over $70,000 compared to 17.2% nationally. The employment status of those at least 15 was that 279 (42.7%) people were employed full-time, 114 (17.4%) were part-time, and 15 (2.3%) were unemployed.

== Education ==
Tapanui School is a co-educational state primary school for Year 1 to 6 students, with a roll of 73 as of July 2026. The school was established in 1868, became Tapanui District High School in 1902, and split into the current school and Blue Mountain College in 1976.

Blue Mountain College is a co-educational state secondary school for Year 7 to 13 students, with a roll of 229.

== Climate ==
Climate data for Tapanui (1991–2020 normals, extremes 1900–2023)
Month	Jan	Feb	Mar	Apr	May	Jun	Jul	Aug	Sep	Oct	Nov	Dec	Year
Record high °C (°F)	34.4 (93.9)	33.9 (93.0)	33.3 (91.9)	28.8 (83.8)	23.7 (74.7)	20.0 (68.0)	19.4 (66.9)	21.7 (71.1)	24.6 (76.3)	31.7 (89.1)	34.4 (93.9)	35.6 (96.1)	35.6 (96.1)
Mean daily maximum °C (°F)	20.9 (69.6)	20.7 (69.3)	19.1 (66.4)	15.9 (60.6)	13.0 (55.4)	9.8 (49.6)	9.4 (48.9)	11.4 (52.5)	13.9 (57.0)	15.7 (60.3)	17.3 (63.1)	19.7 (67.5)	15.6 (60.0)
Daily mean °C (°F)	14.9 (58.8)	14.6 (58.3)	12.9 (55.2)	10.5 (50.9)	8.0 (46.4)	5.5 (41.9)	4.9 (40.8)	6.4 (43.5)	8.3 (46.9)	9.9 (49.8)	11.6 (52.9)	13.8 (56.8)	10.1 (50.2)
Mean daily minimum °C (°F)	8.9 (48.0)	8.6 (47.5)	6.8 (44.2)	5.0 (41.0)	3.0 (37.4)	1.1 (34.0)	0.3 (32.5)	1.4 (34.5)	2.7 (36.9)	4.2 (39.6)	5.8 (42.4)	7.8 (46.0)	4.6 (40.3)
Record low °C (°F)	−2.2 (28.0)	−1.7 (28.9)	−3.9 (25.0)	−5.2 (22.6)	−7.5 (18.5)	−8.9 (16.0)	−14.0 (6.8)	−10.0 (14.0)	−6.7 (19.9)	−5.0 (23.0)	−5.0 (23.0)	−3.3 (26.1)	−14.0 (6.8)
Average rainfall mm (inches)	97.4 (3.83)	80.4 (3.17)	70.4 (2.77)	71.7 (2.82)	82.8 (3.26)	76.8 (3.02)	63.9 (2.52)	56.6 (2.23)	62.5 (2.46)	87.1 (3.43)	85.2 (3.35)	89.3 (3.52)	924.1 (36.38)
Source: NIWA
