= 2020 Mainland Tactix season =

Mainland Tactix season

Mainland Tactix
- 2020 season
- Head coach: Marianne Delaney-Hoshek
- Captain: Jane Watson
- Main venue: Horncastle Arena

Season results
- Wins–losses: 11–7
- Regular season: 2nd
- Finals placing: Super Club 6th ANZ Premiership 2nd
- Team colours

Mainland Tactix seasons
- ← 2019 2021 →

The 2020 Mainland Tactix season saw the Mainland Tactix netball team compete in the 2020 ANZ Premiership. As part of their pre-season preparations, Tactix competed in the 2019 Netball New Zealand Super Club, finishing the tournament in sixth place. With a team coached by Marianne Delaney-Hoshek, captained by Jane Watson and featuring Ellie Bird, Temalisi Fakahokotau, Erikana Pedersen, Kimiora Poi and Te Paea Selby-Rickit, Tactix finished the regular ANZ Premiership season in second place, qualifying for their first grand final. However, in the grand final, Tactix lost to Central Pulse 43–31.

== Players ==
=== Player movements ===
Gains and losses
▲ Gains	▼ Losses
Te Paea Selby-Rickit (Southern Steel); Jess Prosser (NNL Hellers Mainland)	Kate Beveridge; Brooke Leaver; Kate Lloyd; Lily Marshall

=== 2020 roster ===
2020 Mainland Tactix roster
Players
Coaching staff

Nat.	Name	Position(s)	DoB	Height
(New Zealand)	Ellie Bird	GS, GA	22 March 1993 (aged 26)	1.96 m (6 ft 5 in)
(New Zealand)	Charlotte Elley	WD, C	24 June 1996 (aged 23)	1.74 m (5 ft 9 in)
(New Zealand)	Temalisi Fakahokotau	GD, WD, GK	9 September 1994 (aged 25)	1.82 m (6 ft 0 in)
(New Zealand)	Sophia Fenwick	GK, GD	12 December 1992 (aged 27)	1.81 m (5 ft 11 in)
(New Zealand)	Samon Nathan	WA, C, WD	7 December 1992 (aged 27)	1.78 m (5 ft 10 in)
(New Zealand)	Erikana Pedersen	C, WA, WD	28 July 1994 (aged 25)	1.73 m (5 ft 8 in)
(New Zealand)	Kimiora Poi	C, WA	1 November 1997 (aged 22)	1.68 m (5 ft 6 in)
(New Zealand)	Jess Prosser	GS, GA	9 June 1996 (aged 23)	1.83 m (6 ft 0 in)
(New Zealand)	Te Paea Selby-Rickit	GS, GA	14 January 1992 (aged 28)	1.93 m (6 ft 4 in)
(New Zealand)	Jane Watson (c)	GK, GD, WD	7 March 1990 (aged 30)	1.81 m (5 ft 11 in)

Head coach

- (New Zealand) Marianne Delaney- Hoshek

Notes

- (c) – Captain
- (cc) – Co-captain
- (vc) – Vice-captain
- – Injury / maternity leave
- (TRP) – Temporary Replacement Player

== Pre-season ==
=== 2019 Super Club ===
In December 2019, Mainland Tactix together with the other five ANZ Premiership teams plus Collingwood Magpies from Suncorp Super Netball and Wasps Netball from the Netball Superleague competed in the 2019 Netball New Zealand Super Club. Tactix finished the tournament in sixth place.

==== Group B ====
Matches

Sun 8 Dec	Mainland Tactix	46–43	Northern Stars	Trafalgar Centre
8.10pm	Ellie Bird 23/28 (82%); Te Paea Selby-Rickit 15/19 (79%); Jess Prosser 8/11 (73%)	Stats	Maia Wilson 17/21 (81%); Vika Koloto 13/15 (87%); Jamie Hume 7/10 (70%); Julianna Naoupu 6/8 (75%)

Mon 9 Dec	Mainland Tactix	38–51	Collingwood Magpies	Trafalgar Centre
6.35pm	Ellie Bird 22/27 (81%); Te Paea Selby-Rickit 12/15 (80%); Jess Prosser 3/4 (75%); Hannah Glen 1/2 (50%)	Stats	Shimona Nelson 33/37 (89%); Natalie Medhurst 14/17 (82%); Nyah Allen 4/5 (80%)

Tue 10 Dec	Mainland Tactix	43–51	Waikato Bay of Plenty Magic	Trafalgar Centre
6.35pm	Ellie Bird 19/21 (90%); Te Paea Selby-Rickit 20/22 (91%); Jess Prosser 4/4 (100%)	Stats	Kelsey McPhee 32/40 (80%); Abigail Latu-Meafou 9/11 (82%); Georgia Marshall 10/12 (83%)

Final ladder

Group B
Pos	Team	P	W	D	L	GF	GA	%	Pts
1	(Australia) Collingwood Magpies	3	3	0	0	156	112	139.29	6
2	(New Zealand) Waikato Bay of Plenty Magic	3	2	0	1	137	134	102.24	4
3	(New Zealand) Mainland Tactix	3	1	0	2	127	145	87.59	2
4	(New Zealand) Northern Stars	3	0	0	3	123	152	80.92	0

Qualified for Semi-finals
5th/8th place classification

==== 5th/8th place classification ====
Semi-finals

Thu 12 Dec	Mainland Tactix	41–37	Wasps Netball	Trafalgar Centre
3.30pm	Ellie Bird 15/15 (100%); Te Paea Selby-Rickit 16/21 (76%); Jess Prosser 10/12 (83%)	Stats	Rachel Dunn 24/25 (96%); Katie Harris 13/17 (76%)

5th/6th place match

Fri 13 Dec	Southern Steel	50–45	Mainland Tactix	Trafalgar Centre
5.00pm	Jennifer O'Connell 38/51 (75%); Kalifa McCollin 9/11 (82%); Georgia Heffernan 3/6 (50%); Kiana Pelasio 0/3 (0%)	Stats	Ellie Bird 31/36 (86%); Te Paea Selby-Rickit 10/15 (67%); Jess Prosser 4/7 (57%)

=== Canterbury Men's Invitational ===
Mainland Tactix played a Canterbury Men's Invitational team in an exhibition.

Sun 23 Feb	Mainland Tactix	v	Canterbury Men's Invitational	Cowles Stadium, Christchurch
3pm

=== Queenstown series ===
Mainland Tactix played matches against Central Pulse and Southern Steel in Queenstown.

=== Otaki tournament ===
Mainland Tactix participated in the official ANZ Premiership tournament at Te Wānanga o Raukawa in Otaki between 28 February and 1 March. All six ANZ Premiership teams took part.

Fri 28 Feb	Central Pulse	52–51	Mainland Tactix	Te Wānanga o Raukawa
11:00am

Sat 29 Feb	Mainland Tactix	56–50	Northern Mystics	Te Wānanga o Raukawa
4:00 pm

Sun 1 Mar	Mainland Tactix	62–53	Waikato Bay of Plenty Magic	Te Wānanga o Raukawa
11:00am

== Regular season ==
=== Fixtures and results ===
Round 1

Sun 15 Mar	Mainland Tactix	41–53	Central Pulse	Stadium 2000, Blenheim
4:10 pm	Ellie Bird 26/29 (90%); Te Paea Selby-Rickit 15/22 (68%)	Report; Stats	Aliyah Dunn 35/38 (92%); Ameliaranne Ekenasio 18/22 (82%)

Round 2

Sat 20 Jun	Southern Steel	36–43	Mainland Tactix	Auckland Netball Centre
	Kalifa McCollin 22/27 (81%); Jennifer O'Connell 11/12 (92%); Georgia Heffernan 3/4 (75%)	Report; Stats	Ellie Bird 31/39 (79%); Te Paea Selby-Rickit 12/14 (86%)

Sun 21 Jun	Northern Stars	48–43	Mainland Tactix	Auckland Netball Centre
	Maia Wilson 37/40 (93%); Jamie Hume 12/19 (63%)	Stats	Te Paea Selby-Rickit 19/23 (83%); Ellie Bird 18/23 (78%); Jess Prosser 6/6 (100%)

Round 3

Fri 26 Jun	Mainland Tactix	45–36	Waikato Bay of Plenty Magic	Auckland Netball Centre
	Ellie Bird 33/44 (75%); Te Paea Selby-Rickit 12/19 (63%)	Report; Stats	Kelsey McPhee 21/26 (81%); Abigail Latu-Meafou 15/21 (71%)

Round 4

Fri 3 Jul	Northern Mystics	47–42	Mainland Tactix	Auckland Netball Centre
	Grace Nweke 38/40 (95%); Saviour Tui 8/12 (67%); Asher Grapes 1/1 (100%)	Report; Stats	Ellie Bird 26/29 (90%); Te Paea Selby-Rickit 16/24 (67%)

Round 5

Sun 12 Jul	Mainland Tactix	41–40	Northern Mystics	Auckland Netball Centre
	Ellie Bird 20/25 (80%); Te Paea Selby-Rickit 21/24 (88%)	Report; Stats	Grace Nweke 29/32 (91%); Saviour Tui 10/11 (91%); Asher Grapes 1/3 (33%)

Mon 13 Jul	Mainland Tactix	46–46	Waikato Bay of Plenty Magic	Auckland Netball Centre
	Ellie Bird 30/35 (86%); Te Paea Selby-Rickit 14/17 (82%); Jess Prosser 2/6 (33%)	Report; Stats	Kelsey McPhee 23/29 (79%); Abigail Latu-Meafou 23/27; Khiarna Williams 0/1 (0%)

Round 6

Sun 19 Jul	Central Pulse	33–32	Mainland Tactix	Auckland Netball Centre
	Aliyah Dunn 13/13 (100%); Ameliaranne Ekenasio 13/16 (81%); Tiana Metuarau 7/11 (64%)	Report; Stats	Ellie Bird 24/28 (86%); Te Paea Selby-Rickit 8/11 (73%)

Mon 20 Jul	Southern Steel	35–48	Mainland Tactix	Auckland Netball Centre
	Kalifa McCollin 18/21 (86%); Ellen Halpenny 17/23 (74%); Kiana Pelasio 0/1 (0%)	Report; Stats	Ellie Bird 32/34 (94%); Te Paea Selby-Rickit 10/12 (83%); Jess Prosser 5/6 (83%); Hannah Glen 1/1 (100%)

Round 7

Sun 26 Jul	Mainland Tactix	47–40	Northern Stars	Auckland Netball Centre
	Ellie Bird 37/37 (100%); Te Paea Selby-Rickit 10/12 (83%)	Report; Stats	Maia Wilson 32/36 (89%); Jamie Hume 4/9 (44%)

Round 8

Thu 30 Jul	Mainland Tactix	52–42	Northern Stars	Horncastle Arena
	Ellie Bird 37/42 (88%); Te Paea Selby-Rickit 15/19 (79%)	Report; Stats	Maia Wilson 35/40 (88%); Jamie Hume 7/11 (64%)

Sun 2 Aug	Waikato Bay of Plenty Magic	35–44	Mainland Tactix	Claudelands Arena
	Abigail Latu-Meafou 18/22 (82%); Kelsey McPhee 17/22 (77%)	Report; Stats	Ellie Bird 26/30 (87%); Te Paea Selby-Rickit 16/18 (89%); Jess Prosser 2/2 (100%)

Round 9

Mon 10 Aug	Central Pulse	32–39	Mainland Tactix	TSB Bank Arena
	Aliyah Dunn 20/24 (83%); Tiana Metuarau 12/17 (71%)	Report; Stats	Ellie Bird 32/38 (84%); Te Paea Selby-Rickit 7/9 (78%)

Round 10

Sun 16 Aug	Southern Steel	drawn	Mainland Tactix	Edgar Centre

=== Final standings ===
2020 ANZ Premiership ladder
Pos	Team	P	W	L	D	GF	GA	GD	G%	BP	Pts
1	Central Pulse	15	11	2	2	594	474	120	125.3	1	49
2	Mainland Tactix	15	9	4	2	606	566	40	107.1	2	42
3	Northern Mystics	15	7	6	2	582	475	7	101.2	3	35
4	Northern Stars	15	5	7	3	590	626	-36	94.2	3	29
5	Southern Steel	15	4	10	1	578	637	-59	90.7	3	21
6	Waikato Bay of Plenty Magic	15	2	9	4	520	592	-72	87.8	3	19

Qualified for Grand final
Qualified for 3rd/4th place match
Qualified for 5th/6th place match

Point System

- Win = 4 points
- Draw = 2 points
- Loss of 5 or less goals = 1 point
- Loss of more than 5 goals = 0 points

== Finals Series ==
=== Grand final ===
Sun 23 Aug; 6.45pm	Stats	Central Pulse	43–31	Mainland Tactix	Stadium Southland	Sky Sport
Sun 23 Aug; 6.45pm	Stats	Scoring by quarter: 12–6, 23–13, 31–24, 43–31			Stadium Southland	Sky Sport
Sun 23 Aug; 6.45pm	Stats	Aliyah Dunn 28/30 (93%); Ameliaranne Ekenasio 15/18 (83%)		Ellie Bird 19/23 (83%); Te Paea Selby-Rickit 12/13 (92%)	Stadium Southland	Sky Sport

== Award winners ==
=== New Zealand Netball Awards ===
Award	Winner
ANZ Premiership Player of the Year	Jane Watson

=== Team of the season ===
Two Tactix players were included in Stuff's team of the season, selected by Brendon Egan.

Position	Player
GD	Jane Watson
GK	Temalisi Fakahokotau
Coach	Marianne Delaney-Hoshek
