= 2020 Central Pulse season =

Central Pulse season

Central Pulse
- 2020 season
- Head coach: Yvette McCausland-Durie
- Asst. coach: Pelesa Semu
- Captain: Katrina Rore
- Main venue: TSB Bank Arena

Season results
- Wins–losses: 15–4
- Regular season: 1st
- Finals placing: Super Club 3rd ANZ Premiership 1st
- Team colours

Central Pulse seasons
- ← 2019 2021 →

The 2020 Central Pulse season saw the Central Pulse netball team compete in the 2020 ANZ Premiership. As part of their pre-season preparations, Pulse competed in the 2019 Netball New Zealand Super Club, finishing the tournament in third place. With a team coached by Yvette McCausland-Durie, captained by Katrina Rore and featuring Karin Burger, Aliyah Dunn and Ameliaranne Ekenasio, Pulse finished the regular ANZ Premiership season as minor premiers. In the grand final, Pulse defeated Mainland Tactix 43–31, winning their second consecutive premiership.

== Players ==
=== Player movements ===
Gains and losses
| ▲ Gains | ▼ Losses |
|---|---|
| Kelly Jury (Waikato Bay of Plenty Magic); Renee Savai'inaea (Central Manawa) | Sulu Fitzpatrick (Northern Mystics); Whitney Souness (Waikato Bay of Plenty Magic) |

=== 2020 roster ===
2020 Central Pulse roster
Players
Coaching staff

| Nat. | Name | Position(s) | DoB | Height |
|---|---|---|---|---|
| (New Zealand) | Karin Burger | GD, WD, GK | 12 April 1993 (aged 26) | 1.84 m (6 ft 0 in) |
| (New Zealand) | Aliyah Dunn | GS | 19 October 1999 (aged 20) | 1.90 m (6 ft 3 in) |
| (New Zealand) | Ameliaranne Ekenasio | GS, GA | 11 January 1991 (aged 29) | 1.86 m (6 ft 1 in) |
| (New Zealand) | Maddy Gordon | C, WA, WD | 16 January 2000 (aged 20) | 1.74 m (5 ft 9 in) |
| (New Zealand) | Kelly Jury | GK, GD | 22 October 1996 (aged 23) | 1.92 m (6 ft 4 in) |
| (New Zealand) | Claire Kersten | WD, C | 9 July 1989 (aged 30) | 1.75 m (5 ft 9 in) |
| (New Zealand) | Tiana Metuarau | GA, WA, GS | 15 January 2001 (aged 19) | 1.83 m (6 ft 0 in) |
| (New Zealand) | Katrina Rore (c) | GK, GD, WD | 6 May 1987 (aged 32) | 1.87 m (6 ft 2 in) |
| (New Zealand) | Rene Savai'inaea | WD, GD, C | 15 July 2000 (aged 19) | 1.79 m (5 ft 10 in) |
| (New Zealand) | Elle Temu | GK, GD | 3 August 1999 (aged 20) | 1.88 m (6 ft 2 in) |

Head coach

- (New Zealand) Yvette McCausland-Durie

Assistant coach

- (New Zealand) Pelesa Semu

Physiotherapist:
Nikki Lynch
Operations Manager:
Jill Clapcott
High Performance Director/Specialist Coach:
Waimarama Taumaunu
Specialist Coaches:
Vicki Wilson
Anna Andrews
Strength and conditioning:
Adam Allen
Athlete Life: Helen Regan
Nutrition: Rebecca Jones
Mental Skills: Natalie Hogg

Notes

- (c) – Captain
- (cc) – Co-captain
- (vc) – Vice-captain
- – Injury / maternity leave
- (TRP) – Temporary Replacement Player

== Pre-season ==
=== 2019 Super Club ===
In December 2019, Central Pulse together with the other five ANZ Premiership teams plus Collingwood Magpies from Suncorp Super Netball and Wasps Netball from the Netball Superleague competed in the 2019 Netball New Zealand Super Club. Pulse finished the tournament in third place.

==== Group A ====
Matches

| Sun 8 Dec | Central Pulse | 39–49 | Northern Mystics | Trafalgar Centre |
| 6.35pm | Aliyah Dunn 26/34 (76%); Tiana Metuarau 13/21 (62%) | Report; Stats | Grace Nweke 37/44 (84%); Bailey Mes 7/9 (78%); Saviour Tui 5/7 (71%) |

| Mon 9 Dec | Central Pulse | 56–39 | Wasps Netball | Trafalgar Centre |
| 8.10pm | Aliyah Dunn 27/28 (96%); Ameliaranne Ekenasio 14/15 (93%); Tiana Metuarau 15/16 (94%) | Report; Stats | Rachel Dunn 34/40 (85%); Katie Harris 5/8 (63%); Alexia Baker 0/1 (0%) |

| Tue 10 Dec | Central Pulse | 51–28 | Southern Steel | Trafalgar Centre |
| 8.10pm | Aliyah Dunn 26/30 (87%); Ameliaranne Ekenasio 20/23 (87%); Tiana Metuarau 15/16 (94%) | Report; Stats | Jennifer O'Connell 17/23 (74%); Kalifa McCollin 11/13 (85%); Georgia Heffernan 0/4 (0%) |

Final ladder

Group A
| Pos | Team | P | W | D | L | GF | GA | % | Pts |
| 1 | (New Zealand) Northern Mystics | 3 | 2 | 0 | 1 | 142 | 115 | 123.48 | 4 |
| 2 | (New Zealand) Central Pulse | 3 | 2 | 0 | 1 | 146 | 116 | 125.86 | 4 |
| 3 | (New Zealand) Southern Steel | 3 | 2 | 0 | 1 | 123 | 128 | 96.09 | 4 |
| 4 | (England) Wasps Netball | 3 | 0 | 0 | 3 | 106 | 158 | 67.09 | 0 |

Qualified for Semi-finals
5th/8th place classification

==== Semi-finals ====
| Thu 12 Dec | Collingwood Magpies | 54–40 | Central Pulse | Trafalgar Centre |
| 6.35pm | Shimona Nelson 41/44 (93%); Natalie Medhurst 10/11 (91%); Gabrielle Sinclair 2/2 (100%); Nyah Allen 1/1 (100%) | Report; Stats | Aliyah Dunn 28/31 (90%); Ameliaranne Ekenasio 9/12 (75%); Tiana Metuarau 3/3 (100%) |

==== Third place play-off ====
| Fri 13 Dec; 6.35pm | Report; Stats | Central Pulse | 47–45 | Waikato Bay of Plenty Magic | Trafalgar Centre | Sky Sport |
| Fri 13 Dec; 6.35pm | Report; Stats | Aliyah Dunn 32/35 (91%); Ameliaranne Ekenasio 11/13 (85%); Tiana Metuarau 4/4 (100%) | | Kelsey McPhee 31/40 (78%); Georgia Marshall 10/11 (91%); Abigail Latu-Meafou 4/7 (57%) | Trafalgar Centre | Sky Sport |

=== Queensland Firebirds series ===
Central Pulse hosted Queensland Firebirds for a two match series at Te Wānanga o Raukawa in Otaki on 8 and 9 February. Both teams one a match each.

| 8 Feb | Central Pulse | 58–56 | Queensland Firebirds | Te Wānanga o Raukawa |

| 9 Feb | Central Pulse | 54–61 | Queensland Firebirds | Te Wānanga o Raukawa |

=== Queenstown series ===
Central Pulse played matches against Mainland Tactix and Southern Steel in Queenstown.

=== Otaki tournament ===
Central Pulse hosted the official ANZ Premiership tournament at Te Wānanga o Raukawa in Otaki between 28 February and 1 March. All six ANZ Premiership teams took part.

| Fri 28 Feb | Central Pulse | 52–51 | Mainland Tactix | Te Wānanga o Raukawa |
| 11:00am |

| Fri 28 Feb | Central Pulse | 42–25 | Southern Steel | Te Wānanga o Raukawa |
| 6:00 pm |

| Sat 29 Feb | Central Pulse | 61–42 | Northern Stars | Te Wānanga o Raukawa |
| 11:00pm |

| Sat 29 Feb | Central Pulse | 39–36 | Waikato Bay of Plenty Magic | Te Wānanga o Raukawa |
| 6:00 pm |

| Sun 1 Mar | Central Pulse | 69–55 | Northern Mystics | Te Wānanga o Raukawa |
| 1:00 pm |

== Regular season ==
=== Fixtures and results ===
Round 1

| Sun 15 Mar | Mainland Tactix | 41–53 | Central Pulse | Stadium 2000, Blenheim |
| 4:10 pm | Ellie Bird 26/29 (90%); Te Paea Selby-Rickit 15/22 (68%) | Report; Stats | Aliyah Dunn 35/38 (92%); Ameliaranne Ekenasio 18/22 (82%) |

Round 2

| Sun 21 Jun | Northern Stars | 39–63 | Central Pulse | Auckland Netball Centre |
| | Maia Wilson 30/36 (83%); Jamie Hume 7/10 (70%); Vika Koloto 2/3 (67%) | Stats | Aliyah Dunn 43/45 (96%); Ameliaranne Ekenasio 20/22 (91%) |

Round 3

| Mon 29 Jun | Central Pulse | 42–35 | Northern Mystics | Auckland Netball Centre |
| | Ameliaranne Ekenasio 21/24 (88%); Aliyah Dunn 12/14 (86%); Tiana Metuarau 9/12 (75%) | Report; Stats | Grace Nweke 28/33 (85%); Saviour Tui 6/7 (86%); Asher Grapes 1/1 (100%) |

Round 4

| Sat 4 Jul | Central Pulse | 47–40 | Southern Steel | Auckland Netball Centre |
| | Ameliaranne Ekenasio 25/25 (100%); Aliyah Dunn 22/22 (100%) | Report; Stats | Jennifer O'Connell 27/32 (84%); Kalifa McCollin 13/14 (93%) |

| Sun 5 Jul | Central Pulse | 51–30 | Waikato Bay of Plenty Magic | Auckland Netball Centre |
| | Aliyah Dunn 23/27 (85%); Ameliaranne Ekenasio 21/24 (88%); Tiana Metuarau 7/11 (64%) | Report; Stats | Kelsey McPhee 19/26 (73%); Khiarna Williams 8/11 (73%); Abigail Latu-Meafou 3/3 (100%) |

Round 5

| Fri 10 Jul | Central Pulse | 40–37 | Southern Steel | Auckland Netball Centre |
| | Aliyah Dunn 23/25 (92%); Ameliaranne Ekenasio 17/20 (85%) | Report; Stats | Jennifer O'Connell 25/34 (74%); Kalifa McCollin 12/17 (71%) |

Round 6

| Sat 18 Jul | Central Pulse | 44–38 | Northern Mystics | Auckland Netball Centre |
| | Aliyah Dunn 24/29 (83%); Ameliaranne Ekenasio 14/19 (74%); Tiana Metuarau 6/11 (55%) | Report; Stats | Grace Nweke 37/39 (95%); Saviour Tui 1/1 (100%) |

| Sun 19 Jul | Central Pulse | 33–32 | Mainland Tactix | Auckland Netball Centre |
| | Aliyah Dunn 13/13 (100%); Ameliaranne Ekenasio 13/16 (81%); Tiana Metuarau 7/11 (64%) | Report; Stats | Ellie Bird 24/28 (86%); Te Paea Selby-Rickit 8/11 (73%) |

Round 7

| Fri 24 Jul | Central Pulse | 52–29 | Waikato Bay of Plenty Magic | Auckland Netball Centre |
| | Aliyah Dunn 19/20 (95%); Ameliaranne Ekenasio 29/30; Tiana Metuarau 2/4 (50%); Grace McLean 2/2 (100%) | Report; Stats | Khiarna Williams 12/17 (71%); Kelsey McPhee 9/13 (69%); Abigail Latu-Meafou 6/10 (60%); Harley Smith 2/2 (100%) |

| Sat 25 Jul | Central Pulse | 46–36 | Northern Stars | Auckland Netball Centre |
| | Aliyah Dunn 27/30 (90%); Ameliaranne Ekenasio 19/20 (95%) | Report; Stats | Maia Wilson 29/35 (83%); Jamie Hume 7/13 (54%) |

Round 8

| Sun 2 Aug | Central Pulse | 42–44 | Northern Mystics | Te Rauparaha Arena |
| | Aliyah Dunn 21/23 (91%); Ameliaranne Ekenasio 20/28 (71%); Tiana Metuarau 1/2 (50%) | Report; Stats | Grace Nweke 38/44 (86%); Saviour Tui 4/4 (100%); Filda Vui 2/2 (100%) |

Round 9

| Mon 10 Aug | Central Pulse | 32–39 | Mainland Tactix | TSB Bank Arena |
| | Aliyah Dunn 20/24 (83%); Tiana Metuarau 12/17 (71%) | Report; Stats | Ellie Bird 32/38 (84%); Te Paea Selby-Rickit 7/9 (78%) |

Round 10

| Sun 16 Aug | Central Pulse | drawn | Northern Stars | TSB Bank Arena |

| Mon 17 Aug | Central Pulse | drawn | Waikato Bay of Plenty Magic | TSB Bank Arena |

=== Final standings ===
2020 ANZ Premiership ladder
| Pos | Team | P | W | L | D | GF | GA | GD | G% | BP | Pts |
| 1 | Central Pulse | 15 | 11 | 2 | 2 | 594 | 474 | 120 | 125.3 | 1 | 49 |
| 2 | Mainland Tactix | 15 | 9 | 4 | 2 | 606 | 566 | 40 | 107.1 | 2 | 42 |
| 3 | Northern Mystics | 15 | 7 | 6 | 2 | 582 | 475 | 7 | 101.2 | 3 | 35 |
| 4 | Northern Stars | 15 | 5 | 7 | 3 | 590 | 626 | -36 | 94.2 | 3 | 29 |
| 5 | Southern Steel | 15 | 4 | 10 | 1 | 578 | 637 | -59 | 90.7 | 3 | 21 |
| 6 | Waikato Bay of Plenty Magic | 15 | 2 | 9 | 4 | 520 | 592 | -72 | 87.8 | 3 | 19 |

Qualified for Grand final
Qualified for 3rd/4th place match
Qualified for 5th/6th place match

Point System

- Win = 4 points
- Draw = 2 points
- Loss of 5 or less goals = 1 point
- Loss of more than 5 goals = 0 points

== Finals Series ==
=== Grand final ===
| Sun 23 Aug; 6.45pm | Stats | Central Pulse | 43–31 | Mainland Tactix | Stadium Southland | Sky Sport |
| Sun 23 Aug; 6.45pm | Stats | Scoring by quarter: 12–6, 23–13, 31–24, 43–31 | | | Stadium Southland | Sky Sport |
| Sun 23 Aug; 6.45pm | Stats | Aliyah Dunn 28/30 (93%); Ameliaranne Ekenasio 15/18 (83%) | | Ellie Bird 19/23 (83%); Te Paea Selby-Rickit 12/13 (92%) | Stadium Southland | Sky Sport |

== Award winners ==
=== New Zealand Netball Awards ===
| Award | Winner |
|---|---|
| ANZ Premiership Coach of the Year | Yvette McCausland-Durie |

=== ANZ Premiership Awards ===
| Award | Winner |
|---|---|
| Grand Final MVP | Maddy Gordon |

=== Team of the season ===
Three Pulse players were included in Stuff's team of the season, selected by Brendon Egan.

| Position | Player |
|---|---|
| GA | Ameliaranne Ekenasio |
| C | Claire Kersten |
| WD | Karin Burger |
