= 2018 Netball New Zealand Super Club =

Netball tournament

- League: Netball New Zealand Super Club
- Sport: Netball
- Duration: 19 August–24 August 2018
- Teams: 8
- TV partner: Sky Sport (New Zealand)
- Winners: Central Pulse
- Runners-up: Mainland Tactix

Netball New Zealand Super Club seasons
- ← 2017 2019 →

The 2018 Netball New Zealand Super Club was the second edition of Netball New Zealand's invitational tournament. With a team coached by Yvette McCausland-Durie, captained by Katrina Grant and featuring Karin Burger, Aliyah Dunn, Ameliaranne Ekenasio, Sulu Fitzpatrick and Claire Kersten, Central Pulse finished the tournament as winners after defeating Mainland Tactix 61–56 in the final. All the matches were hosted at the Trafalgar Centre in Nelson between 19 August and 24 August 2018. All the matches were broadcast live on Sky Sport (New Zealand). The tournament also featured two-points for long shots as previously used in Fast5 netball.

== Teams ==
The tournament featured eight teams. These included the top three from the 2018 ANZ Premiership season – Southern Steel, Central Pulse and Mainland Tactix.

Team	League
(New Zealand) Central Pulse	ANZ Premiership
(South Africa) Gauteng Jaguars	Telkom Netball League
(Fiji) Marama Vou	^{(Note 1)}
(Australia) New South Wales Institute of Sport	^{(Note 2)}
(New Zealand) Mainland Tactix	ANZ Premiership
(Scotland) UWS Sirens	Netball Superleague
(New Zealand) Southern Steel	ANZ Premiership
Singapore Sneakers	Netball Super League (Singapore)

Notes

^1 Marama Vou were a Pacific Islander representative team organised by Netball Fiji and featuring players from Fiji, Samoa and New Zealand. Vicki Wilson was the team's head coach. Frances Solia served as team mentor.

^2 The New South Wales Institute of Sport team was effectively a combined Netball New South Wales Waratahs and Canberra Giants team.

== Group A ==
=== Matches ===
Day 1

19 August 2018	Mainland Tactix	86–51	Sneakers
6.40pm	Kate Beveridge 36/45 (80%); Jess Prosser 23/36 (64%); Brooke Leaver 9/18 (50%); Hannah Glen 8/10 (80%)	Stats	Pei Ying Wong 17/31 (55%); Amorangi Malesala 13/20 (65%); Xin Yi Liu 0/4 (0%)

19 August 2018	Southern Steel	61–65	Gauteng Jaguars
8.30pm	Jennifer O'Connell 28/36 (78%); Georgia Heffernan 12/26 (46%); Olivia Bates 8/18 (44%)	Report; Stats	Ine-Marí Venter 40/48 (83%); Chantelle Swart 16/26 (62%)

Day 2

20 August 2018	Mainland Tactix	64–36	Gauteng Jaguars
4.50pm	Ellie Bird 28/37 (76%); Jess Prosser 14/19 (74%); Brooke Leaver 12/21 (57%); Hannah Glen 4/6 (67%)	Stats	Ine-Marí Venter 21/36 (58%); Chantelle Swart 6/9 (67%); Danielle Van Zyl 3/5 (60%); Chante Louw 2/3 (67%)

20 August 2018	Southern Steel	80–52	Sneakers
6.40pm	Jennifer O'Connell 40/51 (78%); Georgia Heffernan 24/38 (63%); Olivia Bates 5/11 (45%); Jess Allan 2/4 (50%)	Report; Stats	Xin Yi Liu 13/22 (59%); Pei Ying Wong 12/27 (44%); Amorangi Malesala 8/15 (53%)

Day 3

21 August 2018	Gauteng Jaguars	72–47	Sneakers
3.00pm	Ine-Marí Venter 38/42 (90%); Chante Louw 11/15 (73%); Danielle Van Zyl 10/28 (36%)	Stats	Amorangi Malesala 18/29 (62%); Xin Yi Liu 6/12 (50%); Pei Ying Wong 5/13 (38%)

21 August 2018	Southern Steel	66–51	Mainland Tactix
8.30pm	Jennifer O'Connell 44/51 (86%); Olivia Bates 9/13 (69%); Georgia Heffernan 7/13 (54%)	Report; Stats	Ellie Bird 20/27 (74%); Brooke Leaver 11/21 (52%); Kate Beveridge 10/13 (77%); Jess Prosser 2/3 (67%)

=== Final ladder ===
Group A
Pos	Team	P	W	D	L	GF	GA	%	BP	Pts
1	(New Zealand) Southern Steel	3	2	0	1	207	168	123.2	1	7
2	(New Zealand) Mainland Tactix	3	2	0	1	201	153	131.4	0	6
3	(South Africa) Gauteng Jaguars	3	2	0	1	173	172	100.6	0	6
4	(Singapore) Sneakers	3	0	0	3	150	238	63.0	0	0

Qualified for Semi-finals
5th/8th place classification

== Group B ==
=== Matches ===
Day 1

19 August 2018	NSWIS	71–51	Marama Vou
3.00pm	Georgia Marshall 27/35 (77%); Kelly Singleton 15/24 (63%); Ang Frketic 10/15 (67%); Matisse Letherbarrow 3/4 (75%)	Stats	Laisani Waqa 20/30 (67%); Alyssa-Jean Savelio 15/24 (63%); Kayla Kiss 5/7 (71%)

19 August 2018	Central Pulse	66–33	UWS Sirens
4.50pm	Aliyah Dunn 29/44 (66%); Saviour Tui 14/36 (39%); Mila Reuelu-Buchanan 0/1 (0%)	Stats	Bethan Goodwin 17/27 (63%); Emma Barrie 4/4 (100%); Laura Towell 4/6 (67%); Monica Falkner 4/8 (50%)

Day 2

20 August 2018	UWS Sirens	57–60	Marama Vou
3.00pm	Bethan Goodwin 20/24 (83%); Monica Falkner 19/33 (58%); Laura Towell 4/6 (67%)	Report; Stats	Laisani Waqa 13/18 (72%); Alyssa-Jean Savelio 23/40 (58%); Kayla Kiss 4/7 (57%)

20 August 2018	Central Pulse	49–50	NSWIS
8.30pm	Aliyah Dunn 21/26 (81%); Ameliaranne Ekenasio 11/32 (34%); Saviour Tui 3/5 (60%)	Stats	Georgia Marshall 24/33 (73%); Kelly Singleton 9/14 (64%); Matisse Letherbarrow 7/10 (70%)

Day 3

21 August 2018	NSWIS	57–49	UWS Sirens
4.50pm	Georgia Marshall 29/36 (81%); Kelly Singleton 9/13 (69%); Ang Frketic 6/8 (75%); Matisse Letherbarrow 4/5 (80%)	Stats	Monica Falkner 21/35 (60%); Bethan Goodwin 14/21 (67%); Laura Towell 3/5 (60%)

21 August 2018	Central Pulse	81–35	Marama Vou
6.40pm	Aliyah Dunn 20/29 (69%); Ameliaranne Ekenasio 26/39 (67%); Saviour Tui 10/15 (67%); Tiana Metuarau 6/10 (60%)	Report; Stats	Laisani Waqa 13/20 (65%); Alyssa-Jean Savelio 11/22 (50%); Kayla Kiss 0/3 (0%)

=== Final ladder ===
Group B
Pos	Team	P	W	D	L	GF	GA	%	BP	Pts
1	(New Zealand) Central Pulse	3	2	0	1	196	118	166.1	1	7
2	(Australia) NSWIS	3	3	0	0	178	149	119.5	0	9
3	(Fiji) Marama Vou	3	1	0	2	146	209	69.9	0	3
4	(Scotland) UWS Sirens	3	0	0	3	139	183	76.0	0	0

Qualified for Semi-finals
5th/8th place classification

== 5th/8th place classification ==
=== Semi-finals ===
23 August 2018	Marama Vou	84–66	Sneakers
3.00pm	Laisani Waqa 42/49 (86%); Alyssa-Jean Savelio 22/33 (67%); Kayla Kiss 2/4 (50%)	Report; Stats	Pei Ying Wong 22/36 (61%); Xin Yi Liu 14/23 (61%); Amorangi Malesala 7/16 (44%)

23 August 2018	UWS Sirens	46–39	Gauteng Jaguars
4.50pm	Monica Falkner 22/31 (71%); Bethan Goodwin 9/15 (60%); Emma Barrie 5/5 (100%); Laura Towell 1/3 (33%)	Stats	Ine-Marí Venter 31/36 (86%); Chantelle Swart 4/7 (57%); Danielle Van Zyl 1/8 (13%)

=== 7th/8th place match ===
24 August 2018	Sneakers	60–57	Gauteng Jaguars
3.00pm	Amorangi Malesala 27/42 (64%); Pei Ying Wong 11/25 (44%)	Stats	Chante Louw 25/31 (81%); Ine-Marí Venter 18/29 (62%); Chantelle Swart 6/15 (40%); Danielle Van Zyl 3/5 (60%)

=== 5th/6th place match ===
24 August 2018	UWS Sirens	66–57	Marama Vou
4.50pm	Bethan Goodwin 34/45 (76%); Monica Falkner 23/31 (74%)	Stats	Laisani Waqa 26/33 (79%); Alyssa-Jean Savelio 16/24 (67%); Kayla Kiss 1/2 (50%)

== 1st/4th Play offs ==
=== Semi-finals ===
23 August 2018	Mainland Tactix	64–62	NSWIS
6.40pm	Ellie Bird 30/40 (75%); Kate Beveridge 16/22 (73%); Brooke Leaver 3/4 (75%)	Stats	Georgia Marshall 27/34 (79%); Kelly Singleton 22/28 (79%)

23 August 2018	Central Pulse	64–55	Southern Steel
8.30pm	Aliyah Dunn 34/39 (87%); Ameliaranne Ekenasio 18/26 (69%); Tiana Metuarau 3/6 (50%)	Stats	Jennifer O'Connell 28/35 (80%); Georgia Heffernan 13/26 (50%); Olivia Bates 4/8 (50%)

=== Third place play-off ===
24 August 2018; 6.40pm	Report; Stats	Southern Steel	54–45	NSWIS	Sky Sport
24 August 2018; 6.40pm	Report; Stats	Scoring by quarter: 11–7, 26–22, 36–35, 54–45			Sky Sport
24 August 2018; 6.40pm	Report; Stats	Jennifer O'Connell 31/34 (91%); Georgia Heffernan 12/21 (57%); Jess Allan 4/5 (80%); Olivia Bates 2/7 (29%); Shannon Francois 1/1 (100%)		Matisse Letherbarrow 16/22 (73%); Georgia Marshall 14/19 (74%); Kelly Singleton 8/15 (53%)	Sky Sport

=== Final ===
24 August 2018; 8.30pm	Central Pulse	61–56	Mainland Tactix	Sky Sport
24 August 2018; 8.30pm	Aliyah Dunn 35/39 (90%); Ameliaranne Ekenasio 16/30 (53%); Tiana Metuarau 2/2 (100%)		Ellie Bird 30/38 (79%); Kate Beveridge 15/19 (79%); Brooke Leaver 4/8 (50%)	Sky Sport

== Final standings ==
Rank	Team
1st place, gold medalist(s)	(New Zealand) Central Pulse
2nd place, silver medalist(s)	(New Zealand) Mainland Tactix
3rd place, bronze medalist(s)	(New Zealand) Southern Steel
4th	(Australia) NSWIS
5th	(Scotland) UWS Sirens
6th	(Fiji) Marama Vou
7th	(Singapore) Sneakers
8th	(South Africa) Gauteng Jaguars
