= 2023 Central Pulse season =

Central Pulse season

Central Pulse
- 2023 season
- Head coach: Yvette McCausland-Durie
- Asst. coach: Anna Andrews-Tasola
- Co-captains: Kelly Jury; Tiana Metuarau
- Main venue: TSB Bank Arena

Season results
- Wins–losses: 10–6
- Regular season: 2nd
- Finals placing: 3rd
- Team colours

Central Pulse seasons
- ← 2022 2024 →

The 2023 Central Pulse season saw the Central Pulse netball team compete in the 2023 ANZ Premiership. With a team coached by Yvette McCausland-Durie, co-captained by Kelly Jury and Tiana Metuarau and featuring Maddy Gordon, Whitney Souness and Amelia Walmsley, Central Pulse, finished the regular season in second place behind Northern Mystics. Overall, Pulse finished third after losing 53–52 to Northern Stars and in the Elimination final.

== Players ==
=== Player movements ===
Gains and losses
▲ Gains	▼ Losses
Fa'amu Ioane (Northern Mystics); Joyce Mvula (Manchester Thunder); Paris Mason (Central Manawa); Ainsleyana Puleiata (Central Manawa)	Aliyah Dunn (Mainland Tactix); Courtney Elliott (Southern Steel); Binnian Hunt (injury); Paris Lokotui (injury); Renee Matoe; Erikana Pedersen (retirement)

=== 2023 roster ===
2023 Central Pulse roster
Players
Coaching staff

Nat.	Name	Position(s)	DoB	Height
(New Zealand)	Maddy Gordon	C, WA, WD	16 January 2000 (aged 23)	1.74 m (5 ft 9 in)
(New Zealand)	Fa'amu Ioane	WD,C	11 March 1996 (aged 26)	1.72 m (5 ft 8 in)
(New Zealand)	Kelly Jury (cc)	GK, GD	22 October 1996 (aged 26)	1.92 m (6 ft 4 in)
(Australia)	Kristiana Manu'a	GK, GD, WD	3 September 1995 (aged 27)	1.82 m (6 ft 0 in)
(New Zealand)	Paris Mason	GK, GD, WD	13 December 2002 (aged 20)	1.84 m (6 ft 0 in)
(New Zealand)	Tiana Metuarau (cc)	GA, WA, GS	15 January 2001 (aged 22)	1.83 m (6 ft 0 in)
(Malawi)	Joyce Mvula	GS	14 April 1994 (aged 28)	1.84 m (6 ft 0 in)
(Samoa)	Ainsleyana Puleiata^{1} (injured)	C, WD, WA	27 July 2000 (aged 22)	1.70 m (5 ft 7 in)
(New Zealand)	Katrina Rore^{1} (TRP)	GK, GD, WD	6 May 1987 (aged 35)	1.87 m (6 ft 2 in)
(New Zealand)	Jazz Scott^{1} (TRP)	WD		–
(New Zealand)	Whitney Souness	C, WA	12 November 1995 (aged 27)	1.74 m (5 ft 9 in)
(New Zealand)	Amelia Walmsley	GS, GA	31 January 2004 (aged 19)	1.92 m (6 ft 4 in)

Head coach

- Yvette McCausland-Durie

Assistant coach

- Anna Andrews-Tasola

Notes

- (c) – Captain
- (cc) – Co-captain
- (vc) – Vice-captain
- – Injury / maternity leave
- (TRP) – Temporary Replacement Player

Notes

- ^1 Katrina Rore and Jazz Scott were added to the roster after Ainsleyana Puleiata was injured while playing for Central Manawa in the National Netball League. Rore made a fourth-quarter cameo for Pulse in the Round 5 match against Northern Mystics.

== Pre-season ==
=== Otaki tournament ===
Central Pulse hosted the official ANZ Premiership tournament at Te Wānanga o Raukawa in Ōtaki between 17 and 19 February. All six ANZ Premiership teams took part. It was the sixth edition of the tournament.

Fri Feb 17	Central Pulse	47–48	Waikato Bay of Plenty Magic	Te Wānanga o Raukawa
09:00am

Fri Feb 17	Central Pulse	39–41	Mainland Tactix	Te Wānanga o Raukawa
6.00pm

Sat Feb 18	Central Pulse	48–44	Southern Steel	Te Wānanga o Raukawa
9:00am

Sat Feb 18	Central Pulse	50–54	Northern Mystics	Te Wānanga o Raukawa
6:00pm

Sun Feb 19	Central Pulse	46–48	Northern Stars	Te Wānanga o Raukawa
12:00pm

== Regular season ==
=== Fixtures and results ===
Round 1

Sun 5 Mar	Central Pulse	53–52	Waikato Bay of Plenty Magic	Fly Palmy Arena
4:00 PM	Amelia Walmsley 36/39 (92%); Tiana Metuarau 17/19 (89%)	Report; Stats	Ameliaranne Ekenasio 27/31 (87%); Bailey Mes 25/30 (83%)

Round 2

Sat 11 Mar	Central Pulse	57–37	Southern Steel	TSB Bank Arena
7:00PM	Amelia Walmsley 42/45 (93%); Tiana Metuarau 13/15 (87%); Joyce Mvula 2/3 (67%)	Report; Stats	Georgia Heffernan 20/22 (91%); Jess Allan 13/22 (59%); Meleitia Taupu 4/7 (57%)

Round 3

Sun 19 Mar	Northern Stars	59–51	Central Pulse	Pulman Arena
2:00PM	Maia Wilson 41/45 (91%); Jamie Hume 18/24 (75%)	Report; Stats	Amelia Walmsley 32/37 (86%); Tiana Metuarau 17/20 (85%); Joyce Mvula 2/3 (67%)

Round 4

Sun 26 Mar	Mainland Tactix	50–49	Central Pulse	MainPower Stadium
2:00PM	Aliyah Dunn 33/37 (89%); Te Paea Selby-Rickit 17/20 (85%)	Report; Stats	Amelia Walmsley 40/45 (89%); Tiana Metuarau 9/12 (75%)

Round 5

Sun 2 Apr	Central Pulse	47–48	Waikato Bay of Plenty Magic	Te Rauparaha Arena
2:00PM	Amelia Walmsley 31/38 (82%); Tiana Metuarau 13/15 (87%); Joyce Mvula 3/5 (60%)	Report; Stats	Bailey Mes 30/32 (94%); Ameliaranne Ekenasio 18/20 (90%)

Mon 3 Apr	Central Pulse	51–56	Northern Mystics	Te Rauparaha Arena
7:00PM	Amelia Walmsley 27/34 (79%); Tiana Metuarau 17/18 (94%); Joyce Mvula 7/7 (100%)	Report; Stats	Grace Nweke 45/48 (94%); Monica Falkner 11/12 (92%)

Round 6

Sat 8 Apr	Northern Stars	44–58	Central Pulse	Pulman Arena
7:00PM	Maia Wilson 33/35 (94%); Amorangi Malesala 8/10 (80%); Jamie Hume 3/3 (100%)	Report; Stats	Amelia Walmsley 44/52 (85%); Tiana Metuarau 13/13 (100%); Joyce Mvula 1/1 (100%)

Round 7

Sat 15 Apr	Northern Mystics	53–55	Central Pulse	The Trusts Arena
4:00PM	Grace Nweke 41/45 (91%); Monica Falkner 11/12 (92%); Filda Vui 1/1 (100%)	Report; Stats	Amelia Walmsley 36/50 (72%); Tiana Metuarau 17/19 (89%); Joyce Mvula 2/4 (50%)

Mon 17 Apr	Central Pulse	62–38	Southern Steel	TSB Bank Arena
7:00PM	Amelia Walmsley 52/58 (90%); Tiana Metuarau 10/13 (77%)	Report; Stats	Saviour Tui 11/13 (85%); Georgia Heffernan 18/23 (78%); Jess Allan 9/10 (90%)

Round 8

Sat 22 Apr	Central Pulse	64–62	Northern Stars	TSB Bank Arena
7:00PM	Amelia Walmsley 53/61 (87%); Tiana Metuarau 11/11 (100%)	Report; Stats	Maia Wilson 42/43 (98%); Amorangi Malesala 20

Round 9

Sat 29 Apr	Southern Steel	43–44	Central Pulse	Stadium Southland
7:00PM	Saviour Tui 31/38 (82%); Georgia Heffernan 12/14 (86%)	Report; Stats	Amelia Walmsley 25/26 (96%); Tiana Metuarau 13/16 (81%); Joyce Mvula 6/7 (86%)

Mon 1 May	Mainland Tactix	45–54	Central Pulse	Christchurch Arena
7:00PM	Aliyah Dunn 18/20 (90%); Te Paea Selby-Rickit 27/27 (100%); Vika Koloto 0/1 (0%)	Report; Stats	Amelia Walmsley 45/54 (83%); Tiana Metuarau 9/11 (82%)

Round 10

Sun 7 May	Waikato Bay of Plenty Magic	49–50	Central Pulse	Globox Arena
2:00PM	Bailey Mes 25/30 (83%); Ameliaranne Ekenasio 24/25 (96%)	Report; Stats	Amelia Walmsley 37/39 (95%); Tiana Metuarau 13/15 (87%)

Round 11

Sun 14 May	Central Pulse	62–56	Northern Mystics	TSB Bank Arena
4:00PM	Amelia Walmsley 47/57 (82%); Tiana Metuarau 15/15 (100%)	Report; Stats	Grace Nweke 46/51 (90%); Filda Vui 10/15 (67%)

Round 12

Sat 20 May	Central Pulse	45–54	Mainland Tactix	TSB Bank Arena
7:00PM	Amelia Walmsley 40/47 (85%); Tiana Metuarau 5/5 (100%)	Report; Stats	Aliyah Dunn 37/40 (93%); Te Paea Selby-Rickit 17/23 (74%)

=== Final standings ===
2023 ANZ Premiership ladder
Pos	Team	P	W	L	GF	GA	GD	G%	BP	Pts
1	Northern Mystics	15	11	4	930	828	102	112.3%	3	36
2	Central Pulse	15	10	5	802	746	56	107.5%	3	33
3	Northern Stars	15	9	6	889	835	54	106.5%	3	30
4	Mainland Tactix	15	9	6	793	760	33	104.3%	1	28
5	Waikato Bay of Plenty Magic	15	6	9	791	830	-39	95.3%	4	22
6	Southern Steel	15	0	15	653	859	-206	76.0%	4	4
Last updated: 7 August 2023

Qualified for Grand final
Qualified for Elimination final

== Finals Series ==
=== Elimination final ===
28 May 2023	Central Pulse	52–53	Northern Stars	Te Rauparaha Arena	Sky Sport
28 May 2023	Scoring by quarter: 14–12, 29–25, 37–41, 52–53			Te Rauparaha Arena	Sky Sport
28 May 2023	Amelia Walmsley 41/45 (91%); Tiana Metuarau 11/13 (85%)		Maia Wilson 36/38 (95%); Amorangi Malesala 17/21 (81%)	Te Rauparaha Arena	Sky Sport

== National Netball League ==
With a team featuring Parris Mason, Ainsleyana Puleiata and Jazz Scott, Pulse's reserve team, Central Manawa, won the 2023 National Netball League title after defeating Northern Comets 45–43 in the grand final at TSB Bank Arena.

== Awards ==
=== Team of the season ===
Three Central Pulse players were included in Brendon Egan's Stuff's team of the season.

All Star Seven

Position	Player
C	Maddy Gordon
GK	Kelly Jury

Bench

Positions	Player
WA, C	Whitney Souness
