= Koloto =

Koloto is a surname. Notable people with the surname include:

- Emosi Koloto (born 1965), New Zealand rugby player
- Vika Koloto (born 2002), Tongan New Zealander netball player
