= 2023 Northern Stars season =

Northern Stars season

Northern Stars
- 2023 season
- Head coach: Kiri Wills
- Asst. coach: Paula Smith
- Captain: Maia Wilson
- Main venue: Pulman Arena

Season results
- Wins–losses: 10–7
- Regular season: 3rd
- Finals placing: 2nd
- Team colours

Northern Stars seasons
- ← 2022 2024 →

The 2023 Northern Stars season saw the Northern Stars netball team compete in the 2023 ANZ Premiership. With a team coached by Kiri Wills, captained by Maia Wilson and featuring Gina Crampton, Mila Reuelu-Buchanan and Elle Temu, Stars finished the regular season in third place, behind Northern Mystics and Central Pulse. In the Elimination final, Stars defeated Pulse 53–52. Mystics then defeated Stars 74–56 in the Grand final.

== Players ==
=== Player movements ===
Gains and losses
▲ Gains	▼ Losses
Samon Nathan (Mainland Tactix); Kelera Nawai-Caucau (Mainland Tactix); Lisa Putt (Northern Comets)	Kayla Johnson (pregnant); Anna Harrison (retirement); Lisa Mather (Saracens Mavericks); Greer Sinclair (Mainland Tactix)

=== 2023 roster ===
2023 Northern Stars roster
Players
Coaching staff

Nat.	Name	Position(s)	DoB	Height
(New Zealand)	Gina Crampton	WA, C	7 December 1991 (aged 31)	1.74 m (5 ft 9 in)
(New Zealand)	Holly Fowler	GD, WD, C	18 July 1997 (aged 25)	1.81 m (5 ft 11 in)
(New Zealand)	Jamie Hume	GA, GS	22 March 1996 (aged 26)	1.82 m (6 ft 0 in)
(New Zealand)	Amorangi Malesala	GS, GA	19 July 1998 (aged 24)	1.79 m (5 ft 10 in)
(New Zealand)	Samon Nathan	WA, C, WD	7 December 1992 (aged 30)	1.78 m (5 ft 10 in)
(Fiji)	Kelera Nawai-Caucau	GK, GD	14 December 1997 (aged 25)	1.87 m (6 ft 2 in)
(New Zealand)	Lisa Putt	GK, GD, WD	2 October 2001 (aged 21)	1.81 m (5 ft 11 in)
(New Zealand)	Mila Reuelu-Buchanan	WA, C	11 May 1998 (aged 24)	1.72 m (5 ft 8 in)
(New Zealand)	Katrina Rore^{1} (TRP)	GK, GD, WD	6 May 1987 (aged 35)	1.87 m (6 ft 2 in)
(New Zealand)	Elle Temu	GK, GD	3 August 1999 (aged 23)	1.88 m (6 ft 2 in)
(New Zealand)	Maia Wilson (c)	GS, GA	21 September 1997 (aged 25)	1.87 m (6 ft 2 in)

Head coach

- Kiri Wills

Assistant coach

- Paula Smith

Notes

- (c) – Captain
- (cc) – Co-captain
- (vc) – Vice-captain
- – Injury / maternity leave
- (TRP) – Temporary Replacement Player

Notes

- ^1 Katrina Rore came out of retirement and helped Northern Stars defeat her former team, Central Pulse 59–51 in Round 3.

== Pre-season ==
=== Otaki tournament ===
Northern Stars participated in the official ANZ Premiership tournament, hosted by Central Pulse at Te Wānanga o Raukawa in Ōtaki between 17 and 19 February. All six ANZ Premiership teams took part.

Fri Feb 17	Southern Steel	55–37	Northern Stars	Te Wānanga o Raukawa
12:00pm

Sat Feb 18	Northern Mystics	48–45	Northern Stars	Te Wānanga o Raukawa
10.30am

Sat Feb 18	Mainland Tactix	56–44	Northern Stars	Te Wānanga o Raukawa
4.30pm

Sun Feb 19	Central Pulse	46–48	Northern Stars	Te Wānanga o Raukawa
12:00pm

== Regular season ==
=== Fixtures and results ===
Round 1

Mon 6 Mar	Northern Stars	49–55	Mainland Tactix	Pulman Arena
7:00 PM	Maia Wilson 34/35 (97%); Amorangi Malesala 12/16 (75%); Jamie Hume 3/7 (43%)	Report; Stats	Aliyah Dunn 39/44 (89%); Te Paea Selby-Rickit 15/18 (83%); Vika Koloto 1/1 (100%)

Round 2

Sat 11 Mar	Waikato Bay of Plenty Magic	47–66	Northern Stars	Trustpower Arena
4:00PM	Bailey Mes 27/32 (84%); Ameliaranne Ekenasio 20/23 (87%)	Report; Stats	Maia Wilson 44/48 (92%); Amorangi Malesala 11/14 (79%); Jamie Hume 11/15 (73%)

Mon 13 Mar	Northern Stars	74–40	Southern Steel	Pulman Arena
7:00PM	Maia Wilson 59/61 (97%); Amorangi Malesala 6/7 (86%); Jamie Hume 9/13 (69%)	Report; Stats	Eseta Autagavaia 19/26 (73%); Georgia Heffernan 15/23 (65%); Jess Allan 6/6 (100%)

Round 3

Sun 19 Mar	Northern Stars	59–51	Central Pulse	Pulman Arena
2:00PM	Maia Wilson 41/45 (91%); Jamie Hume 18/24 (75%)	Report; Stats	Amelia Walmsley 32/37 (86%); Tiana Metuarau 17/20 (85%); Joyce Mvula 2/3 (67%)

Round 4

Sun 26 Mar	Northern Mystics	62–59	Northern Stars	The Trusts Arena
4:00PM	Grace Nweke 46/46 (100%); Monica Falkner 15/17 (88%); Filda Vui 1/1 (100%)	Report; Stats	Maia Wilson 32/34 (94%); Amorangi Malesala 19/24 (79%); Jamie Hume 8/14 (57%)

Round 5

Sun 2 Apr	Northern Stars	57–48	Mainland Tactix	Pulman Arena
4:00PM	Maia Wilson 36/38 (95%); Amorangi Malesala 21/25 (84%)	Report; Stats	Aliyah Dunn 32/34 (94%); Te Paea Selby-Rickit 16/19 (84%)

Round 6

Sat 8 Apr	Northern Stars	44–58	Central Pulse	Pulman Arena
7:00PM	Maia Wilson 33/35 (94%); Amorangi Malesala 8/10 (80%); Jamie Hume 3/3 (100%)	Report; Stats	Amelia Walmsley 44/52 (85%); Tiana Metuarau 13/13 (100%); Joyce Mvula 1/1 (100%)

Mon 10 Apr	Waikato Bay of Plenty Magic	71–57	Northern Stars	Globox Arena
7:00PM	Bailey Mes 54/58 (93%); Ameliaranne Ekenasio 17/18 (94%)	Report; Stats	Maia Wilson 37/39 (95%); Amorangi Malesala 9/12 (75%); Jamie Hume 11/11 (100%)

Round 7

Sat 15 Apr	Northern Stars	49–47	Southern Steel	Pulman Arena
7:00PM	Maia Wilson 32/37 (86%); Amorangi Malesala 13/15 (87%); Jamie Hume 4/8 (50%)	Report; Stats	Saviour Tui 28/31 (90%); Georgia Heffernan 14/17 (82%); Eseta Autagavaia 5/9 (56%)

Round 8

Sat 22 Apr	Central Pulse	64–62	Northern Stars	TSB Bank Arena
7:00PM	Amelia Walmsley 53/61 (87%); Tiana Metuarau 11/11 (100%)	Report; Stats	Maia Wilson 42/43 (98%); Amorangi Malesala 20

Mon 24 Apr	Northern Mystics	77–79	Northern Stars	The Trusts Arena
7:00PM	Grace Nweke 70/75 (93%); Filda Vui 7/11 (64%)	Report; Stats	Maia Wilson 50/54 (93%); Amorangi Malesala 27/32 (84%); Jamie Hume 2/3 (67%)

Round 9

Sun 30 Apr	Northern Stars	61–55	Waikato Bay of Plenty Magic	Pulman Arena
4:00PM	Maia Wilson 47/49 (96%); Amorangi Malesala 14/20 (70%); Jamie Hume 0/1 (0%)	Report; Stats	Bailey Mes 30/36 (83%); Ameliaranne Ekenasio 25/27 (93%)

Round 10

Sun 7 May	Mainland Tactix	50–57	Northern Stars	Christchurch Arena
4:00PM	Aliyah Dunn 32/36 (89%); Te Paea Selby-Rickit 18/22 (82%)	Report; Stats	Maia Wilson 34/37 (92%); Amorangi Malesala 23/28 (82%)

Round 11

Mon 15 May	Southern Steel	47–58	Northern Stars	Stadium Southland
7:00 PM	Saviour Tui 35/41 (85%); Georgia Heffernan 12/16 (75%)	Report; Stats	Maia Wilson 42/43 (98%); Amorangi Malesala 13/20 (65%); Jamie Hume 3/5 (60%)

Round 12

Sun 21 May	Northern Stars	63–58	Northern Mystics	Pulman Arena
2:00PM	Maia Wilson 33/36 (92%); Amorangi Malesala 25/29 (86%)	Report; Stats	Grace Nweke 52/56 (93%); Filda Vui 11/13 (85%)

=== Final standings ===
2023 ANZ Premiership ladder
Pos	Team	P	W	L	GF	GA	GD	G%	BP	Pts
1	Northern Mystics	15	11	4	930	828	102	112.3%	3	36
2	Central Pulse	15	10	5	802	746	56	107.5%	3	33
3	Northern Stars	15	9	6	889	835	54	106.5%	3	30
4	Mainland Tactix	15	9	6	793	760	33	104.3%	1	28
5	Waikato Bay of Plenty Magic	15	6	9	791	830	-39	95.3%	4	22
6	Southern Steel	15	0	15	653	859	-206	76.0%	4	4
Last updated: 7 August 2023

Qualified for Grand final
Qualified for Elimination final

== Finals Series ==
=== Elimination final ===
28 May 2023	Central Pulse	52–53	Northern Stars	Te Rauparaha Arena	Sky Sport
28 May 2023	Scoring by quarter: 14–12, 29–25, 37–41, 52–53			Te Rauparaha Arena	Sky Sport
28 May 2023	Amelia Walmsley 41/45 (91%); Tiana Metuarau 11/13 (85%)		Maia Wilson 36/38 (95%); Amorangi Malesala 17/21 (81%)	Te Rauparaha Arena	Sky Sport

=== Grand final ===
4 June 2023	Northern Mystics	74–56	Northern Stars	Globox Arena	Sky Sport
4 June 2023	Scoring by quarter: 21–17, 38–29, 54–45, 74–56			Globox Arena	Sky Sport
4 June 2023	Grace Nweke 70/73 (96%); Filda Vui 3/5 (60%); Danielle Binks 1/1 (100%)		Maia Wilson 38/42 (90%); Amorangi Malesala 17/21 (81%); Jamie Hume 1/3 (33%)	Globox Arena	Sky Sport

== National Netball League ==
With a team featuring Lisa Putt, Stars reserve team, Northern Comets, finished as runners up in the 2023 National Netball League. In the grand final they lost 45–43 to Central Manawa.

== Award winners ==
=== Team of the season ===
Three Stars players featured in Brendon Egan's Stuff's team of the season.

All Star Seven

Position	Player
WA	Gina Crampton

Bench

Positions	Player
GS	Maia Wilson
GK, GD	Elle Temu

=== Robinhood Stars Awards ===
Award	Winner
Stonz Jewellers Player of the Year	Gina Crampton
Members Choice Player of the Year	Amorangi Malesala
Players Choice Player of the Year	Mila Reuelu-Buchanan
Emerging Talent Award	Amorangi Malesala
Matariki Award	Gina Crampton; Holly Fowler
