= 2022 Northern Stars season =

Northern Stars season

Northern Stars
- 2022 season
- Head coach: Kiri Wills
- Asst. coach: Paula Smith
- Captain: Maia Wilson
- Main venue: Pulman Arena

Season results
- Wins–losses: 12–5
- Regular season: 2nd
- Finals placing: 2nd
- Team colours

Northern Stars seasons
- ← 2021 2023 →

The 2022 Northern Stars season saw the Northern Stars netball team compete in the 2022 ANZ Premiership. With a team coached by Kiri Wills, captained by Maia Wilson and featuring Gina Crampton, Anna Harrison and Kayla Johnson, Stars finished the regular season in second place, behind Central Pulse and above Northern Mystics. In the Elimination final, Stars defeated Mystics 63–57. Pulse then defeated Stars 56–37 in the Grand final.

== Players ==
=== Player movements ===
Gains and losses
▲ Gains	▼ Losses
Eseta Autagavaia (Northern Comets); Holly Fowler(Waikato Bay of Plenty Magic); Kayla Johnson; Greer Sinclair (Northern Comets)	Monica Falkner (Northern Mystics); Oceane Maihi (Waikato Bay of Plenty Magic)

=== 2022 roster ===
2022 Northern Stars roster
Players
Coaching staff

Nat.	Name	Position(s)	DoB	Height
(Samoa)	Eseta Autagavaia (TRP)	GS, GA	14 June 1996 (aged 25)	1.85 m (6 ft 1 in)
(New Zealand)	Leana de Bruin (TRP)	GD, GK	9 July 1977 (aged 44)	1.90 m (6 ft 3 in)
(New Zealand)	Gina Crampton	WA, C	7 December 1991 (aged 30)	1.74 m (5 ft 9 in)
(New Zealand)	Holly Fowler	GD, WD, C	18 July 1997 (aged 24)	1.81 m (5 ft 11 in)
(New Zealand)	Anna Harrison	GK, GD, WD	15 April 1983 (aged 38)	1.8 m (5 ft 11 in)
(New Zealand)	Jamie Hume	GA, GS	22 March 1996 (aged 25)	1.82 m (6 ft 0 in)
(New Zealand)	Kayla Johnson	GD, WD, C	13 February 1992 (aged 30)	1.83 m (6 ft 0 in)
(New Zealand)	Amorangi Malesala	GS, GA	19 July 1998 (aged 23)	1.79 m (5 ft 10 in)
(New Zealand)	Lisa Mather	WD, C, WA	4 July 1999 (aged 22)	1.70 m (5 ft 7 in)
(New Zealand)	Storm Purvis (TRP)	GD, GK	20 April 1993 (aged 28)	1.86 m (6 ft 1 in)
(New Zealand)	Mila Reuelu-Buchanan	WA, C	11 May 1998 (aged 23)	1.72 m (5 ft 8 in)
(New Zealand)	Greer Sinclair (TRP)	GK, GD, WD	26 September 2000 (aged 21)	1.82 m (6 ft 0 in)
(New Zealand)	Elle Temu	GK, GD	3 August 1999 (aged 22)	1.88 m (6 ft 2 in)
(New Zealand)	Maia Wilson (c)	GS, GA	21 September 1997 (aged 24)	1.87 m (6 ft 2 in)

Head coach

- Kiri Wills

Assistant coach

- Paula Smith

Notes

- (c) – Captain
- (cc) – Co-captain
- (vc) – Vice-captain
- – Injury / maternity leave
- (TRP) – Temporary Replacement Player

== Impact of COVID-19 pandemic ==
=== Matches cancelled ===
Just like the 2020 season, the 2022 season was impacted by the COVID-19 pandemic. Stars' Round 1 match against Central Pulse was cancelled following a COVID-19 outbreak in the Pulse squad. Further Stars' matches were cancelled throughout the season, most notably in early April when three of their matches were cancelled across Rounds 4 and 5.

=== Temporary replacement players ===
- Greer Sinclair, a Northern Stars training partner, played for four teams during the season. As well as played for Northern Comets in the National Netball League, she also played for Stars, Northern Mystics and Waikato Bay of Plenty Magic in the ANZ Premiership. She played for Stars in the Round 3 match against Southern Steel.
- Eseta Autagavaia scored for and against Stars during the season. After initially featuring as a replacement player for Stars, she finished the season playing for Waikato Bay of Plenty Magic. In Round 6 she scored for Stars in a 63–51 win against Mainland Tactix. In Round 9 she played and scored for Magic against Stars.
- Storm Purvis came out of retirement to play for Stars and made her 100th senior league appearance in a Round 10 match against Waikato Bay of Plenty Magic.
- Leana de Bruin partnered Elle Temu in defense in the absence of Anna Harrison, during the Round 10 match against Central Pulse. De Bruin was making her second league appearance of the 2022 ANZ Premiership after an earlier successful comeback for Waikato Bay of Plenty Magic.

== Regular season ==
=== Fixtures and results ===
Round 1

Mon 14 Mar	Northern Stars	^{(Note 2)}	Central Pulse	Pulman Arena
7.15pm		Report

Round 2

Sun 20 Mar	Mainland Tactix	52–57	Northern Stars	Cowles Stadium, Christchurch
2.10pm	Ellie Bird 34/37 (92%); Te Paea Selby-Rickit 18/22 (82%)	Report; Stats	Maia Wilson 34/38 (89%); Jamie Hume 23/30 (77%)

Round 3

Sun 27 Mar	Southern Steel	71–62	Northern Stars	Stadium Southland
4.10pm	George Fisher 51/52 (98%); Saviour Tui 11/14 (79%); Georgia Heffernan 9/10 (90%)	Report; Stats	Maia Wilson 45/49 (92%); Jamie Hume 17/22 (77%); Amorangi Malesala 0/1 (0%)

Round 4

Sat 2 Apr	Northern Stars	^{(Note 2)}	Mainland Tactix	The Trusts Arena
2.10pm		Report

Mon 4 Apr	Northern Stars	^{(Note 2)}	Southern Steel	Pulman Arena
7.15pm		Report

Round 5

Sun 10 Apr	Northern Stars	^{(Note 2)}	Waikato Bay of Plenty Magic	Pulman Arena
4.10pm		Report

Round 6

Sat 16 Apr	Mainland Tactix	51–63	Northern Stars	Christchurch Arena
4.10pm	Ellie Bird 33/35 (94%); Te Paea Selby-Rickit 18/23 (78%)	Report; Stats	Maia Wilson 37/44 (84%); Jamie Hume 37/44 (84%); Amorangi Malesala 12/19 (63%); Eseta Autagavaia 2/2 (100%)

Rescheduled Round 4 match

Wed 20 Apr	Northern Stars	56–48	Mainland Tactix	Pulman Arena
7.10pm	Maia Wilson 31/34 (91%); Jamie Hume 17/24 (71%); Amorangi Malesala 8/12 (67%)	Report; Stats	Ellie Bird 21/24 (88%); Te Paea Selby-Rickit 17/21 (81%); Hannah Glen 10/11 (91%)

Round 7

Wed 27 Apr	Northern Stars	46–56	Central Pulse	Pulman Arena
7.15pm	Maia Wilson 26/28 (93%); Jamie Hume 14/20 (70%); Amorangi Malesala 6/9 (67%)	Report; Stats	Aliyah Dunn 37/39 (95%); Tiana Metuarau 19/25 (76%)

Round 8

Sun 1 May	Central Pulse	46–47	Northern Stars	Fly Palmy Arena
4.10pm	Aliyah Dunn 29/31 (94%); Tiana Metuarau 17/21 (81%)	Report; Stats	Jamie Hume 24/32 (75%); Maia Wilson 23/29 (79%)

Round 9

Sat 7 May	Northern Stars	47–39	Waikato Bay of Plenty Magic	Pulman Arena
4.10pm	Maia Wilson 31/40 (78%); Jamie Hume 13/22 (59%); Amorangi Malesala 3/4 (75%)	Report; Stats	Bailey Mes 23/24 (96%); Ivana Rowland 11/17 (65%); Eseta Autagavaia 5/7 (71%)

Sun 8 May	Northern Stars	51–54	Northern Mystics	Pulman Arena
4.10pm	Maia Wilson 20/28 (71%); Jamie Hume 17/24 (71%); Amorangi Malesala 14/16 (88%)	Report; Stats	Grace Nweke 49/55 (89%); Monica Falkner 3/6 (50%); Filda Vui 2/3 (67%)

Round 10

Sat 14 May	Waikato Bay of Plenty Magic	53–67	Northern Stars	Globox Arena
2.10pm	Ameliaranne Ekenasio 31/34 (91%); Bailey Mes 22/27 (81%)	Report; Stats	Maia Wilson 41/43 (95%); Jamie Hume 23/28 (82%); Amorangi Malesala 3/5 (60%)

Sun 15 May	Central Pulse	44–49	Northern Stars	TSB Bank Arena
4.10pm	Aliyah Dunn 28/32 (88%); Tiana Metuarau 16/19 (84%)	Report; Stats	Maia Wilson 36/42 (86%); Amorangi Malesala 8/10 (80%); Jamie Hume 5/9 (56%)

Round 11

Sun 22 May	Northern Stars	59–38	Northern Mystics	Pulman Arena
2.10pm	Maia Wilson 37/47 (79%); Jamie Hume 18/28 (64%); Amorangi Malesala 4/7 (57%)	Report; Stats	Monica Falkner 14/17 (82%); Filda Vui 14/19 (74%); Grace Namana 9/11 (82%); Phoenix Karaka 1/1 (100%); Danielle Binks 0/1 (0%)

Round 12

Sun 29 May	Southern Steel	60–62	Northern Stars	Stadium Southland
2.10pm	George Fisher 45/46 (98%); Georgia Heffernan 13/15 (87%); Saviour Tui 2/3 (67%)	Report; Stats	Maia Wilson 44/48 (92%); Jamie Hume 18/24 (75%)

Round 13
Rescheduled matches

Wed 1 Jun	Northern Stars	58–54	Waikato Bay of Plenty Magic	Pulman Arena
7.10pm	Maia Wilson 42/47 (89%); Amorangi Malesala 13/18 (72%); Jamie Hume 3/10 (30%)	Report; Stats	Ameliaranne Ekenasio 34/41 (83%); Bailey Mes 20/24 (83%)

Thur 2 Jun	Northern Stars	68–49	Southern Steel	Pulman Arena
7.10pm	Maia Wilson 51/55 (93%); Jamie Hume 15/17 (88%); Amorangi Malesala 2/4 (50%)	Report; Stats	George Fisher 33/35 (94%); Saviour Tui 9/13 (69%); Georgia Heffernan 7/9 (78%)

Notes

- ^2 Matches postponed under the ANZ Premiership's COVID-19 Match Postponement Policy.

=== Final standings ===
2022 ANZ Premiership ladder
Pos	Team	P	W	D	L	GF	GA	GD	G%	BP	Pts
1	Central Pulse	15	10	0	5	828	732	96	113.1%	4	34
2	Northern Stars	15	11	0	4	836	783	53	106.8%	1	34
3	Northern Mystics	15	9	0	6	858	807	51	106.3%	4	31
4	Southern Steel	15	6	0	9	853	898	-45	95%	2	20
5	Waikato Bay of Plenty Magic	15	4	0	11	733	803	-70	91.3%	4	16
6	Mainland Tactix	15	5	0	10	788	873	-85	90.3%	1	16
Last updated: 12 August 2022

Qualified for Grand final
Qualified for Elimination final

== Finals Series ==
=== Elimination final ===
8 June 2022	Northern Stars	63–57	Northern Mystics	Pulman Arena	Sky Sport
8 June 2022	Scoring by quarter: 16–10, 33–23, 48–43, 63–57			Pulman Arena	Sky Sport
8 June 2022	Maia Wilson 42/44 (95%); Jamie Hume 21/25 (84%)		Grace Nweke 45/49 (92%); Grace Namana 8/8 (100%); Monica Falkner 4/6 (67%)	Pulman Arena	Sky Sport

=== Grand final ===
12 June 2022	Central Pulse	56–37	Northern Stars	TSB Bank Arena	Sky Sport
12 June 2022	Scoring by quarter: 15–6, 26–15, 42–26, 56–37			TSB Bank Arena	Sky Sport
12 June 2022	Aliyah Dunn 44/47 (94%); Tiana Metuarau 11/13 (85%); Amelia Walmsley 1/2 (50%); Renee Matoe 0/2 (0%)		Maia Wilson 21/25 (84%); Amorangi Malesala 13/17 (76%); Jamie Hume 3/4 (75%)	TSB Bank Arena	Sky Sport

== Award winners ==
=== Team of the season ===
Five Stars players featured in Brendon Egan's Stuff's team of the season.

Stuff Super Seven

Position	Player
WA	Gina Crampton
C	Mila Reuelu-Buchanan
GD	Elle Temu

Bench

Positions	Player
GS	Maia Wilson
GK, GD, WD	Anna Harrison

=== Robinhood Stars Awards ===
Award	Winner
Stonz Jewellers Player of the Year	Gina Crampton
Members Choice Player of the Year	Elle Temu
Players Choice Player of the Year	Elle Temu
Emerging Talent Award	Holly Fowler
Matariki Award	Elle Temu
