= Netball New Zealand Super Club =

Netball tournament

- Sport: Netball
- Founded: 2017
- First season: 2017
- Owner: Netball New Zealand
- Country: New Zealand
- Most recent champions: Collingwood Magpies (1 win) (2019)
- Most titles: Southern Steel; Central Pulse; Collingwood Magpies (1 win each)
- Broadcaster: Sky Sport (New Zealand)
- Related competitions: ANZ Premiership

The Netball New Zealand Super Club was a netball tournament organised by Netball New Zealand. It featured teams from the ANZ Premiership as well as invited overseas teams, including teams from Australia, Great Britain, South Africa and Singapore. Southern Steel won the inaugural 2017 tournament, while Central Pulse and Collingwood Magpies won the subsequent 2018 and 2019 tournaments respectively. All three tournaments were hosted at the Trafalgar Centre in Nelson, New Zealand. All the matches were broadcast live on Sky Sport (New Zealand).

== History ==
=== Foundation ===
Following the demise of the ANZ Championship, in November 2016 Netball New Zealand announced they wanted to create "a super club competition" in order to continue to provide New Zealand players and clubs with international experience.

=== Tournaments ===
2017

With a team coached by Reinga Bloxham, captained by Wendy Frew and featuring Gina Crampton, Jhaniele Fowler-Reid, Shannon Francois, and Jane Watson, Southern Steel finished the 2017 tournament as inaugural winners. Steel went through the tournament unbeaten, defeating Northern Mystics 79–58 in the final.

2018

With a team coached by Yvette McCausland-Durie, captained by Katrina Grant and featuring Karin Burger, Ameliaranne Ekenasio, Sulu Fitzpatrick and Claire Kersten, Central Pulse finished the 2018 tournament as winners after defeating Mainland Tactix 61–56 in the final.

2019

With a team coached by Rob Wright, captained by Geva Mentor and featuring Natalie Medhurst, Ashleigh Brazill and Shimona Nelson, Collingwood Magpies finished the 2019 tournament as winners after defeating Northern Mystics 49–42 in the final.

== Host venue ==
After partnering with Nelson City Council, Netball New Zealand awarded hosting rights for the first three tournaments to Nelson's Trafalgar Centre. The 2017, 2018 and 2019 tournaments were all subsequently hosted at the same venue.

== Trophy ==
The Super Club trophy was designed by Jens Hansen Jewellers of Nelson, New Zealand. Their previous designs have included the One Ring, as featured in The Lord of the Rings and The Hobbit, and the Super Rugby Trophy. The trophy, which is made of brass and solid sterling silver, features seven interlocking bands shaped into the exact size of a number-five competition netball. The seven bands represent the seven players that make up a netball team. The base is made from reclaimed Lebanese cedar. The original tree, from which the base was made from, was planted in Queens Gardens around 1890.

== Results ==
=== Third place play-offs ===
Tournament	Third place	Score	Fourth place
2017	NSWIS	48–46	Central Pulse
2018	Southern Steel	54–45	NSWIS
2019	Central Pulse	47–45	Waikato Bay of Plenty Magic

=== Finals ===
Tournament	Winners	Score	Runners up
2017	Southern Steel	79–58	Northern Mystics
2018	Central Pulse	61–56	Mainland Tactix
2019	Collingwood Magpies	49–42	Northern Mystics

== Participating teams ==
Team	2017	2018	2019	Total
(New Zealand) Central Pulse	4th	1st	3rd	3
(New Zealand) Southern Steel	1st	3rd	5th	3
(South Africa) Gauteng Jaguars	7th	8th	-	2
(New Zealand) Mainland Tactix	-	2nd	6th	2
(Fiji) Marama Vou	8th	5th	-	2
(Australia) New South Wales Institute of Sport	3rd	4th	-	2
(New Zealand) Northern Mystics	2nd	-	2nd	2
(Wales) Celtic Flames	5th	-	-	1
(Australia) Collingwood Magpies	-	-	1st	1
(New Zealand) Northern Stars	-	-	7th	1
(Scotland) UWS Sirens	-	6th	-	1
(Singapore) Sneakers	-	7th	-	1
University of Trinidad and Tobago	6th	-	-	1
(New Zealand) Waikato Bay of Plenty Magic	-	-	4th	1
(England) Wasps Netball	-	-	8th	1
