= Netball in Fiji =

Overview of the ball sport in Fiji

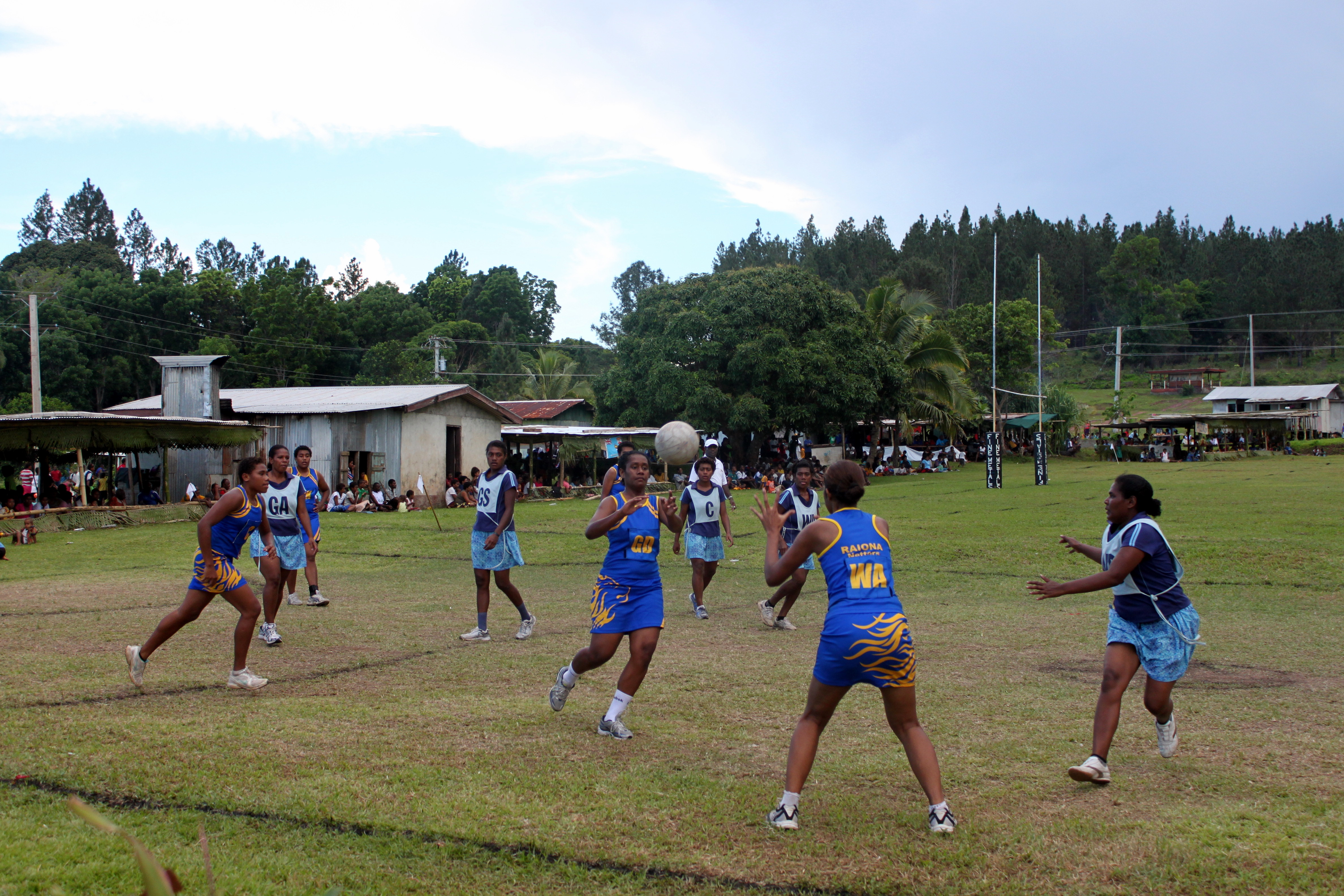
- A netball competition at Natalei, Fiji.
- Country: Fiji
- National team: Fiji

Netball in Fiji is a popular sport, with a men's and a women's national team. Netball games are most often played by girls on Saturdays during the winter, though games can be played at all times of the year. Women's participation in netball is comparable to men's participation in rugby.

== History ==
The sport started to grow in popularity during the 1970s. Continuing growth of the game in Fiji was at times hampered by the fact that the sport is not an Olympic one. For Olympic sports, money can be tapped to help cover costs for inter-island travel for international competitions. The lack of netball being recognized makes it harder to find money to cover these costs.

== International competitions ==
Samoa and Fiji are traditional netball rivals. This rivalry can be seen at events like Pacific Games.

Fiji was supposed to host the 2007 World Netball Championships, but a military coup caused the IFNA to move the championship to Auckland.

As of August 2016, the women's national team was ranked number seven in the world.

Fiji has a men's national team that has competed in the 2009 and 2011 International Challenge Men's and Mixed Netball Tournament.

Fiji U21 side competed in the 2017 Netball World Youth Cup in Botswana, Gaborone and placed 4th. Highest ranking for any Fiji Netball side.

== Bibliography ==
- All England Netball Association (1976). Golden jubilee : 1926 - 1976. All England Netball Association. OCLC 39500756.
- Crocombe, R G (1992). Pacific neighbours : New Zealand's relations with other Pacific Islands : Aotearoa me Nga Moutere o te Moana Nui a Kiwa. Centre for Pacific Studies, University of Canterbury : Institute of Pacific Studies, University of the South Pacific. ISBN 982-02-0078-4. OCLC 28814021.
- International Federation of Netball Associations (21 January 2011a). "Current World Rankings". Archived from the original on 19 May 2011.
- Lal, Brij Vilash; Fortune, Kate (2000). The Pacific islands : an encyclopedia. University of Hawai'i press. ISBN 0-8248-2265-X. OCLC 468583962.
- MacKinnon, Rowan (2009). South Pacific [the only guide to the entire South Pacific]. Lonely Planet. ISBN 978-1-74104-786-8. OCLC 610105853.
- Miller, Korina; Jones, Robyn; Pinheiro, Leonardo (2003). Fiji. Lonely Planet. ISBN 1-74059-134-8. OCLC 473924847.
- Samoa Observer (28 February 2011). "A journey of a thousand miles begins for Samoa national men's netball team". Samoa Observer. Archived from the original on 19 March 2012.
- Starnes, Dean; Luckham, Nana (2009). Lonely Planet Fiji. Lonely Planet. ISBN 978-1-74104-793-6. OCLC 312626596.
