= Emosi Koloto =

New Zealand rugby league & Tonga rugby union international player

Personal information
- Full name: Emosi Tangitangi-'ae'valu Koloto
- Born: 23 January 1965 (age 61) Nuku'alofa, Tonga

Playing information
- Height: 184 cm (6 ft 0 in)
- Weight: 103 kg (16 st 3 lb)

Rugby union
- Position: Flanker
Club
Years	Team	Pld	T	G	FG	P
1984–86	Manawatu	31				96
1987–89	Wellington	16				68
	Total	47	0	0	0	164
Representative
Years	Team	Pld	T	G	FG	P
1986	Tonga	1	0	0	0	0

Rugby league
- Position: Second-row
Club
Years	Team	Pld	T	G	FG	P
1988–95	Widnes	147	27	0	0	108
	Wainuiomata Lions
	Total	147	27	0	0	108
Representative
Years	Team	Pld	T	G	FG	P
1989–??	Wellington
1991	New Zealand	5	0	0	0	0
- Education: Palmerston North Boys' High School
- Relatives: Vika Koloto (daughter)

Emosi Koloto is a former rugby league and rugby union footballer. He won one international cap for Tonga in rugby union in 1986, and five for New Zealand in rugby league in 1991. Koloto played his rugby league as a second-row.

== Early years ==
Koloto grew up in Manawatu and attended Palmerston North Boys' High School.

== Rugby Union ==
Koloto was selected for the New Zealand national schoolboy rugby union team in 1983. He then representing Manawatu from 1984 to 1986. He played for New Zealand Universities in 1985 and then in 1996 he was selected to represent Tonga in rugby union.

Koloto moved to Wellington for the 1987 season, scoring two tries on his debut.

== Rugby League ==
Koloto then switched codes to rugby league, signing with Widnes. Widnes coach Doug Laughton spotted Koloto when he played for Wellington against Wales in 1988.

Koloto won the League Championship with Widnes in his first season 1988-89. He also won two Premiership Trophy Finals in 1988-89 and 1989-90.

Koloto played at second-row in Widnes' 24–18 victory over Salford in the 1990 Lancashire Cup Final during the 1990–91 season at Central Park, Wigan on Saturday 29 September 1990.

He played in Widnes' 6–12 defeat by Wigan in the 1988–89 John Player Special Trophy Final during the 1988–89 season at Burnden Park, Bolton on Saturday 7 January 1989.

In 1991 he made the New Zealand national rugby league team, playing in five tests including the three test series against Australia where he started in the second row in all three tests. He agreed to terms with Manly for 1991 but was drafted by North Sydney, and, like Terry Hill but in contrast to Ron Gibbs, his appeal was turned down on 26 April 1991 and Koloto refused to play in Sydney.

== Return to New Zealand ==
After returning to New Zealand Koloto has resided in Auckland. He coached the Papatoetoe Rugby club.

He is now an accountant.

His daughter Vika Koloto is a netballer who has played for the Northern Stars.

His nephew Fred Koloto is an offensive tackle at San Jose State.
