= 2019 Netball New Zealand Super Club =

Netball tournament

- League: Netball New Zealand Super Club
- Sport: Netball
- Duration: 8 December–13 December 2019
- Teams: 8
- TV partner: Sky Sport (New Zealand)
- Winners: Collingwood Magpies
- Runners-up: Northern Mystics

Netball New Zealand Super Club seasons
- ← 2018

The 2019 Netball New Zealand Super Club was the third edition of the invitational club-based netball tournament organised by Netball New Zealand. With a team coached by Rob Wright, captained by Geva Mentor and featuring Natalie Medhurst, Ashleigh Brazill and Shimona Nelson, Collingwood Magpies finished the 2019 tournament as winners after defeating Northern Mystics 49–42 in the final. The staging of the 2019 tournament was delayed because of the 2019 Netball World Cup. This effectively made it a pre-season tournament for the teams involved. All the matches were hosted at the Trafalgar Centre in Nelson between 8 December and 13 December 2019 and were broadcast live on Sky Sport (New Zealand).

== Teams ==
The tournament featured eight teams. These included all six ANZ Premiership teams plus Collingwood Magpies from Suncorp Super Netball and Wasps Netball from the Netball Superleague.

| Team | League |
|---|---|
| (New Zealand) Central Pulse | ANZ Premiership |
| (Australia) Collingwood Magpies | Suncorp Super Netball |
| (New Zealand) Mainland Tactix | ANZ Premiership |
| (New Zealand) Northern Mystics | ANZ Premiership |
| (New Zealand) Northern Stars | ANZ Premiership |
| (New Zealand) Southern Steel | ANZ Premiership |
| (New Zealand) Waikato Bay of Plenty Magic | ANZ Premiership |
| (England) Wasps Netball | Netball Superleague |

== Group A ==
=== Matches ===
Day 1

| Sun 8 Dec | Southern Steel | 50–36 | Wasps Netball |
| 5.00pm | Jennifer O'Connell 24/26 (92%); Kalifa McCollin 14/15 (93%); Georgia Heffernan 12/19 (63%) | Report; Stats | Rachel Dunn 29/33 (88%); Katie Harris 4/6 (67%); Tamsin Moala 3/7 (43%) |

| Sun 8 Dec | Central Pulse | 39–49 | Northern Mystics |
| 6.35pm | Aliyah Dunn 26/34 (76%); Tiana Metuarau 13/21 (62%) | Report; Stats | Grace Nweke 37/44 (84%); Bailey Mes 7/9 (78%); Saviour Tui 5/7 (71%) |

Day 2

| Mon 9 Dec | Southern Steel | 45–41 | Northern Mystics |
| 3.30pm | Jennifer O'Connell 20/26 (77%); Kalifa McCollin 10/11 (91%); Georgia Heffernan 11/17 (65%); Kiana Pelasio 4/6 (67%) | Report; Stats | Grace Nweke 35/40 (88%); Bailey Mes 3/4 (75%); Saviour Tui 3/5 (60%) |

| Mon 9 Dec | Central Pulse | 56–39 | Wasps Netball |
| 8.10pm | Aliyah Dunn 27/28 (96%); Ameliaranne Ekenasio 14/15 (93%); Tiana Metuarau 15/16 (94%) | Report; Stats | Rachel Dunn 34/40 (85%); Katie Harris 5/8 (63%); Alexia Baker 0/1 (0%) |

Day 3

| Tue 10 Dec | Northern Mystics | 52–31 | Wasps Netball |
| 5.00pm | Saviour Tui 23/25 (92%); Grace Nweke 19/24 (79%); Bailey Mes 10/11 (91%) | Stats | Rachel Dunn 20/23 (87%); Katie Harris 8/11 (73%); Tamsin Moala 3/5 (60%); Alexia Baker 0/2 (0%) |

| Tue 10 Dec | Central Pulse | 51–28 | Southern Steel |
| 8.10pm | Aliyah Dunn 26/30 (87%); Ameliaranne Ekenasio 20/23 (87%); Tiana Metuarau 15/16 (94%) | Report; Stats | Jennifer O'Connell 17/23 (74%); Kalifa McCollin 11/13 (85%); Georgia Heffernan 0/4 (0%) |

=== Final ladder ===
Group A
| Pos | Team | P | W | D | L | GF | GA | % | Pts |
| 1 | (New Zealand) Northern Mystics | 3 | 2 | 0 | 1 | 142 | 115 | 123.48 | 4 |
| 2 | (New Zealand) Central Pulse | 3 | 2 | 0 | 1 | 146 | 116 | 125.86 | 4 |
| 3 | (New Zealand) Southern Steel | 3 | 2 | 0 | 1 | 123 | 128 | 96.09 | 4 |
| 4 | (England) Wasps Netball | 3 | 0 | 0 | 3 | 106 | 158 | 67.09 | 0 |

Qualified for Semi-finals
5th/8th place classification

== Group B ==
=== Matches ===
Day 1

| Sun 8 Dec | Waikato Bay of Plenty Magic | 33–52 | Collingwood Magpies |
| 3.30pm | Kelsey McPhee 12/18 (67%); Abigail Latu-Meafou 11/16 (69%); Georgia Marshall 10/12 (83%) | Stats | Shimona Nelson 41/44 (93%); Gabrielle Sinclair 9/12 (75%); Nyah Allen 2/3 (67%) |

| Sun 8 Dec | Mainland Tactix | 46–43 | Northern Stars |
| 8.10pm | Ellie Bird 23/28 (82%); Te Paea Selby-Rickit 15/19 (79%); Jess Prosser 8/11 (73%) | Stats | Maia Wilson 17/21 (81%); Vika Koloto 13/15 (87%); Jamie Hume 7/10 (70%); Julianna Naoupu 6/8 (75%) |

Day 2

| Mon 9 Dec | Northern Stars | 39–53 | Waikato Bay of Plenty Magic |
| 5.00pm | Maia Wilson 20/22 (91%); Jamie Hume 12/18 (67%); Vika Koloto 1/1 (100%); Julianna Naoupu 6/10 (60%) | Stats | Kelsey McPhee 34/37 (92%); Abigail Latu-Meafou 11/14 (79%); Khiarna Williams 5/5 (100%); Georgia Marshall 3/4 (75%) |

| Mon 9 Dec | Mainland Tactix | 38–51 | Collingwood Magpies |
| 6.35pm | Ellie Bird 22/27 (81%); Te Paea Selby-Rickit 12/15 (80%); Jess Prosser 3/4 (75%); Hannah Glen 1/2 (50%) | Stats | Shimona Nelson 33/37 (89%); Natalie Medhurst 14/17 (82%); Nyah Allen 4/5 (80%) |

Day 3

| Tue 10 Dec | Northern Stars | 41–53 | Collingwood Magpies |
| 3.30pm | Maia Wilson 31/33 (94%); Julianna Naoupu 6/9 (67%); Vika Koloto 4/6 (67%) | Stats | Shimona Nelson 36/38 (95%); Nyah Allen 7/8 (88%); Gabrielle Sinclair 7/9 (78%); Natalie Medhurst 3/3 (100%) |

| Tue 10 Dec | Mainland Tactix | 43–51 | Waikato Bay of Plenty Magic |
| 6.35pm | Ellie Bird 19/21 (90%); Te Paea Selby-Rickit 20/22 (91%); Jess Prosser 4/4 (100%) | Stats | Kelsey McPhee 32/40 (80%); Abigail Latu-Meafou 9/11 (82%); Georgia Marshall 10/12 (83%) |

=== Final ladder ===
Group B
| Pos | Team | P | W | D | L | GF | GA | % | Pts |
| 1 | (Australia) Collingwood Magpies | 3 | 3 | 0 | 0 | 156 | 112 | 139.29 | 6 |
| 2 | (New Zealand) Waikato Bay of Plenty Magic | 3 | 2 | 0 | 1 | 137 | 134 | 102.24 | 4 |
| 3 | (New Zealand) Mainland Tactix | 3 | 1 | 0 | 2 | 127 | 145 | 87.59 | 2 |
| 4 | (New Zealand) Northern Stars | 3 | 0 | 0 | 3 | 123 | 152 | 80.92 | 0 |

Qualified for Semi-finals
5th/8th place classification

== 5th/8th place classification ==
=== Semi-finals ===
| Thu 12 Dec | Mainland Tactix | 41–37 | Wasps Netball |
| 3.30pm | Ellie Bird 15/15 (100%); Te Paea Selby-Rickit 16/21 (76%); Jess Prosser 10/12 (83%) | Stats | Rachel Dunn 24/25 (96%); Katie Harris 13/17 (76%) |

| Thu 12 Dec | Southern Steel | 38–37 | Northern Stars |
| 5.00pm | Jennifer O'Connell 13/20 (65%); Kalifa McCollin 14/20 (70%); Georgia Heffernan 7/8 (88%); Kiana Pelasio 4/4 (100%) | Stats | Maia Wilson 26/32 (81%); Jamie Hume 8/11 (73%); Julianna Naoupu 3/5 (60%) |

=== 7th/8th place match ===
| Fri 13 Dec | Northern Stars | 52–41 | Wasps Netball |
| 3.30pm | Maia Wilson 26/32 (81%); Jamie Hume 8/11 (73%); Julianna Naoupu 3/5 (60%) | Stats | Rachel Dunn 28/32 (88%); Katie Harris 12/14 (86%); Tamsin Moala 1/2 (50%) |

=== 5th/6th place match ===
| Fri 13 Dec | Southern Steel | 50–45 | Mainland Tactix |
| 5.00pm | Jennifer O'Connell 38/51 (75%); Kalifa McCollin 9/11 (82%); Georgia Heffernan 3/6 (50%); Kiana Pelasio 0/3 (0%) | Stats | Ellie Bird 31/36 (86%); Te Paea Selby-Rickit 10/15 (67%); Jess Prosser 4/7 (57%) |

== 1st/4th Play offs ==
=== Semi-finals ===
| Thu 12 Dec | Collingwood Magpies | 54–40 | Central Pulse |
| 6.35pm | Shimona Nelson 41/44 (93%); Natalie Medhurst 10/11 (91%); Gabrielle Sinclair 2/2 (100%); Nyah Allen 1/1 (100%) | Report; Stats | Aliyah Dunn 28/31 (90%); Ameliaranne Ekenasio 9/12 (75%); Tiana Metuarau 3/3 (100%) |

| Thu 12 Dec | Northern Mystics | 49–42 | Waikato Bay of Plenty Magic |
| 8.10pm | Grace Nweke 42/48 (88%); Bailey Mes 5/6 (83%); Saviour Tui 2/4 (50%) | Stats | Georgia Marshall 19/23 (83%); Kelsey McPhee 18/25 (72%); Abigail Latu-Meafou 5/7 (71%) |

=== Third place play-off ===
| Fri 13 Dec; 6.35pm | Report; Stats | Central Pulse | 47–45 | Waikato Bay of Plenty Magic | Sky Sport |
| Fri 13 Dec; 6.35pm | Report; Stats | Aliyah Dunn 32/35 (91%); Ameliaranne Ekenasio 11/13 (85%); Tiana Metuarau 4/4 (100%) | | Kelsey McPhee 31/40 (78%); Georgia Marshall 10/11 (91%); Abigail Latu-Meafou 4/7 (57%) | Sky Sport |

=== Final ===
| Fri 13 Dec; 8.10pm | Stats | Northern Mystics | 42–49 | Collingwood Magpies | Sky Sport |
| Fri 13 Dec; 8.10pm | Stats | Grace Nweke 30/33 (91%); Bailey Mes 7/10 (70%); Saviour Tui 5/7 (71%) | | Shimona Nelson 32/37 (86%); Natalie Medhurst 17/18 (94%) | Sky Sport |

== Rankings ==
| Rank | Team |
|---|---|
| 1st place, gold medalist(s) | (Australia) Collingwood Magpies |
| 2nd place, silver medalist(s) | (New Zealand) Northern Mystics |
| 3rd place, bronze medalist(s) | (New Zealand) Central Pulse |
| 4th | (New Zealand) Waikato Bay of Plenty Magic |
| 5th | (New Zealand) Southern Steel |
| 6th | (New Zealand) Mainland Tactix |
| 7th | (New Zealand) Northern Stars |
| 8th | (England) Wasps Netball |
