= Netball in Samoa =

Overview of the ball sport in Samoa

- Country: Samoa
- National team: Samoa

Netball in Samoa is a popular game, usually played by girls on Saturdays during the winter, though games can be played at all times of the year. The sport started to grow in popularity during the 1970s. The popularity of netball is also growing amongst men on the island.

== International competition ==
Samoa and Fiji are traditional netball rivals. This rivalry can be seen at events like Pacific Games.

As of August 2016, the women's national team was ranked fourteen in the world.

Samoa has a men's national team that has competed in the 2009 and 2011 International Challenge Men's and Mixed Netball Tournament.

At Gay Games VI, a transgender netball from Samoa competed.

== Notable players ==
Rita Fatialofa is a Samoan netball player, who later went on to compete on New Zealand's national team. She became the coach for the Samoan national team, qualifying them for every Pacific Games, as well as 1991 and 1995 Netball World Championships. Cathrine Latu is another famous Samoan player who went on to play for New Zealand.

== Bibliography ==
- Crocombe, R G (1992). Pacific neighbours : New Zealand's relations with other Pacific Islands : Aotearoa me Nga Moutere o te Moana Nui a Kiwa. Centre for Pacific Studies, University of Canterbury : Institute of Pacific Studies, University of the South Pacific. ISBN 982-02-0078-4. OCLC 28814021.
- International Federation of Netball Associations (21 January 2011a). "Current World Rankings". Archived from the original on 19 May 2011.
- Lal, Brij Vilash; Fortune, Kate (2000). The Pacific islands : an encyclopedia. University of Hawai'i press. ISBN 0-8248-2265-X. OCLC 468583962.
- MacKinnon, Rowan (2009). South Pacific [the only guide to the entire South Pacific]. Lonely Planet. ISBN 978-1-74104-786-8. OCLC 610105853.
- Samoa Observer (28 February 2011). "A journey of a thousand miles begins for Samoa national men's netball team". Samoa Observer. Archived from the original on 19 March 2012.
- Symons, Carol; Hemphill, Dennis (November 2006). "Netball and transgender participation". In Caudwell, Jayne (ed.). Sport, sexualities and queer/theory. Routledge Critical Studies in Sport. Routledge. pp. 122–124. ISBN 0-415-36761-1.
