= Trafalgar Centre =

Events centre in Nelson, New Zealand

- 'The Hangar'
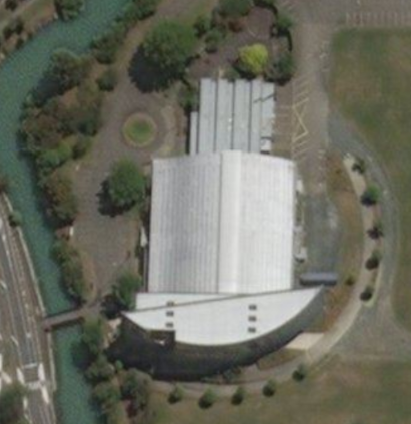
- Interactive map of Trafalgar Centre
- Location: Nelson, New Zealand
- Coordinates: 41.267828°S 173.279205°E
- Capacity: Basketball / Netball: 2,460; Concerts: 1,974; Banquet: 1,500

Construction
- Opened: 1973

Tenants
- Nelson Giants (1982–2013, 2016–)

The Trafalgar Centre is a multipurpose events centre located in Nelson, New Zealand. The stadium was built in 1972 and opened in 1973. The main stadium holds up to 2,460 people. It can be used as two tennis courts or four basketball courts.

== Tenants ==
The Nelson Giants use the Trafalgar Centre for their home games. The stadium is nicknamed 'The Hangar' by loyal Giants fans.

== WDF World Cup ==
In 1981, the WDF World Cup was held at Trafalgar Centre. It was only the third ever WDF World Cup and the only one ever to be held in New Zealand. England won the overall event. Some of the tournament winners included: Eric Bristow, John Lowe, Tony Brown and Cliff Lazarenko.

== Netball ==
Mainland Tactix have used Trafalgar Centre for some home matches. After partnering with Nelson City Council, Netball New Zealand awarded hosting rights for the Netball New Zealand Super Club to the venue. The 2017, 2018 and 2019 tournaments were all subsequently hosted at Trafalgar Centre.

== Upgrades ==
Between 2007 and 2009, upgrades were made on the ageing venue, with a number of safety and sustainability improvements made. The upgrades included:

- Improved lighting
- Improved ventilation
- Resealed floor
- Sprinkler installation
- Construction of new public toilets
- New changing rooms constructed
- A southern extension to the arena
- Permanent stage
- New storage space
- 460 additional mobile seats
- Extra basketball/netball court

Between 2014 and 2015, the venue underwent earthquake strengthening.
