= Netball Super League (Singapore) =

Netball tournament

- Upcoming season or competition: 2021 Netball Super League Season
- Sport: Netball
- Founded: 2000
- No. of teams: 6
- Country: Singapore
- Most recent champion: Blaze Dolphins (2025)

The Netball Super League is a five-month-long, 15-round netball tournament developed to cater for elite players in Singapore. It was established and is governed by Netball Singapore and six teams compete. The 2025 competition was won by the Blaze Dolphins.

== Teams ==
- As of 2020 (see here)

Teams (2020)
Blaze Dolphins
Fier Orcas
Llabten Narwhals
Mission Mannas
Sneakers Stingrays
Swifts Barracudas
Previous Teams
Magic Marlins
Malaysian Arowanas
Bedok Kings Vipers
Tiger Sharks
M1 Sunfish (21&U Players)

== Previous winners ==
Source (only between 2007-2020):

Year	Champions	Runners-up
2025	Blaze Dolphins	Sneakers Stingrays
2024	Blaze Dolphins	Sneakers Stingrays
2023	Blaze Dolphins	Sneakers Stingrays
2022	Blaze Dolphins	Sneakers Stingrays
2020	Sneakers Stingrays	Mission Mannas
2019	Blaze Dolphins	Mission Mannas
2018	Blaze Dolphins	Mission Mannas
2017	Mission Mannas	Tiger Sharks
2016	Blaze Dolphins	Sneakers Stingrays
2015	Sneakers Stingrays	Magic Marlins
2014	Mission Mannas	Blaze Dolphins
2013	Magic Marlins	Mission Mannas
2012	Nike Marlins	Blaze Dolphins
2011	Nike Marlins	Blze Dolphins
2010	Malaysian Arowanas	Mighty Mannas
2009	Stingrays	Marlins
2008	Marlins	Stingrays
2007	Marlins	Vipers
2006	Stingrays	Vipers
2005	Arowanas	Mannas
2004	Mannas	Arowanas
2003	Marlins	Vipers
2002	Stingrays	Sharks
2001	Sharks	Mannas
2000	Stingrays	
