= Saviour Tui =

Samoa netball international

Personal information
- Full name: Saviour Tui
- Born: 17 October 2001 (age 25)
- Height: 1.89 m (6 ft 2 in)
- School: St Mary's College, Wellington

Netball career
- Playing positions: GS, GA
Years	Club team	Apps
2018	Central Zone	
2018	→ Central Pulse	
2019	→ Central Manawa	
2019–2021	Northern Mystics	16
2021	→ Northern Marvels	9
2022–2023	Southern Steel	
2024–	Waikato Bay of Plenty Magic	
Years	National team	Caps
2022–	Samoa	
2024–	New Zealand	
Medal record
Representing New Zealand
Fast5 Netball World Series
Silver medal – second place	2024 Christchurch	Team

Saviour Tui (born 17 October 2001) is a netball player who has represented both Samoa and New Zealand at international level. Tui was a member of three title winning teams in New Zealand's National Netball League. In 2018 and 2019, Tui won titles with Central Zone/Central Manawa. In 2021 she won a third title with Northern Marvels. She was also a member of the Central Pulse team that won the 2018 Netball New Zealand Super Club tournament. She was a fringe member of the 2021 Northern Mystics team that were ANZ Premiership champions. Since 2024, she has played for Waikato Bay of Plenty Magic in the ANZ Premiership.

== Early life, family and education ==
Tui is a Samoan New Zealander. She also has Tokelauan ancestry. She was raised in Wainuiomata in Lower Hutt. She was educated at St Mary's College, Wellington.

== Playing career ==
=== Central Zone/Central Manawa ===
In 2018 and 2019, Tui played for Central Zone/Central Manawa in the National Netball League. She was just 16 and still at school when first included in the Central Zone team. She was subsequently a member of two Central Zone/Central Manawa NNL title winning teams. After helping Central Zone win a second title in 2018, she helped, the now renamed Central Manawa, complete a three in a row in 2019. In the 2019 final, Tui, scored 36 from 38 as they defeated Waikato Bay of Plenty 49–46.

=== Central Pulse ===
Tui played for Central Pulse in the 2018 Netball New Zealand Super Club tournament. She played and scored for Pulse in all three group stage matches.

=== Northern Mystics ===
Between 2019 and 2021, Tui played for Northern Mystics. She was a member of the Mystics team that finished as runners up in the 2019 Netball New Zealand Super Club tournament. She was subsequently a regular in 2020 Mystics team. She was only a fringe member of the 2021 Northern Mystics team that were ANZ Premiership champions. She played just 14 minutes of game time, down from 374 minutes in 2020. Tui was kept out of the team by Grace Nweke, Bailey Mes and Filda Vui. However she was a prominent member of the Northern Marvels team, the Mystics reserve team, that were 2021 National Netball League champions. Tui played all nine NNL matches for Marvels and she finished the season as the NNL top scorer with 337 goals and a 91% accuracy rate. In the grand final she scored 56 from 58 as Marvels defeated Northern Comets 64–56. She was also named player of the match. It was Marvels' first NNL title and Tui's third. She was subsequently named National Netball League Player of the Year.

=== Southern Steel ===
Ahead of the 2022 season, Tui signed for Southern Steel.

=== International ===
==== New Zealand ====
In 2018 and 2019, Tui was included in New Zealand schoolgirl squads. She also played for the New Zealand under 21s in the 2020 Cadbury Netball Series. She was included in the New Zealand squad for the 2024 Fast5 Netball World Series.

==== Samoa ====
In July 2022, Tui played for Samoa at the 2023 Netball World Cup Oceania qualifiers.

== Statistics ==
=== ANZ Premiership ===
Season	Team	G/A	GA	RB	CPR	FD	IC	DF	PN	TO	MP
2020	Mystics	86/105 (82%)	43	1	105	65	0	1	5	20	13
2021	Mystics	6/8 (75%)	1	1	3	4	0	0	0	1	3
2022	Steel	127/160 (79%)	65	5	85	98	3	1	4	44	12
2023	Steel	Goals scored									
Career											

== Honours ==
Northern Mystics

- ANZ Premiership
  - Winners: 2021
  - Minor premiers: 2021
- Netball New Zealand Super Club
  - Runners Up: 2019

Central Pulse

- Netball New Zealand Super Club
  - Winners: 2018

Central Zone/Central Manawa

- National Netball League
  - Winners: 2018, 2019

Northern Marvels

- National Netball League
  - Winners: 2021

Individual Awards

Year	Award
2021	National Netball League Player of the Year
