= Vika Koloto =

Tongan New Zealander netball player

Personal information
- Born: 8 May 2002 (age 23); Auckland, New Zealand
- Education: Baradene College of the Sacred Heart
- Parent: Emosi Koloto (father)

Vika Koloto (born 8 May 2002) is a Tongan New Zealander netball player who plays as a wing attack, goal attack, and goal shooter. She has represented Tonga internationally. She is the daughter of rugby league player Emosi Koloto.

Koloto was born in Auckland, New Zealand and was educated at Baradene College of the Sacred Heart. She has been playing netball since the age of nine.

In 2019 she was named to the New Zealand Secondary Schools netball team. In 2020 she was selected for the Northern Stars and the New Zealand under-21 netball team. In 2021 she played for the Northern Comets. In January 2022 she was selected for the Mainland Tactix as a replacement for pregnant Jane Watson. In January 2023 she was selected for the Mainland Tactix as an injury replacement for Hannah Glen.

In 2022 she was selected for the Tonga national netball team for the 2023 Netball World Cup Oceania qualifiers.
