= Edward Peters (prospector) =

19th century New Zealand gold prospector

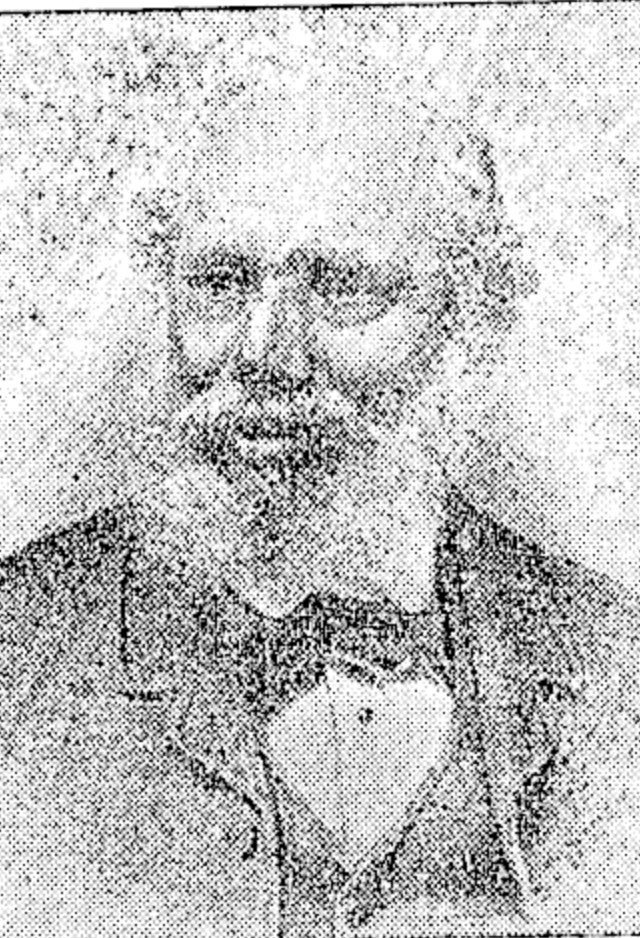
- Born: c. 1826; Satara, Maharashtra, India
- Died: 5 June 1893; Dunedin, New Zealand
- Burial place: Southern Cemetery, Dunedin, New Zealand
- Other name: Black Peter
- Occupations: Farmer, prospector
- Known for: Discovered the first goldfield in New Zealand which later lead to the Otago gold rush

Edward Peters (c. 1826–1893), otherwise known as Black Peter, was a farm hand and pioneer gold prospector who first reported finding gold in the Tokomairaro River which would later become part of New Zealand's first workable goldfield: the Tuapeka Goldfield, including Gabriel's Gully.

Peters was born in India and came to New Zealand in 1853 having previously worked in the California goldfields. Despite his discovery, he died a pauper in Dunedin, the significance of his efforts never truly being recognised during this lifetime due to a combination of racism and local politics at the time.

== Early life ==
Edward Peters was born in Satara in Maharashtra state, India, around 1826, though this is uncertain. Born into the Maratha caste, Peters is often recorded as being a native of Bombay (Mumbai), a Eurasian or a half-caste. At some point, in search of a livelihood, he moved to Bombay and began taking jobs on ships. This initially took him to California where he would participate in the gold rush of the late 1840s. It is most-likely he adopted his Christian name between leaving India and arriving in the west. After California, there is some evidence that Peters then moved onto working the Victorian gold fields in Australia, but this remains uncertain and poorly documented.

== New Zealand ==
Peters would eventually make his way to New Zealand onboard the sailing ship Maori where he had enlisted as the ship's cook. The Maori initially departed from Gravesend, England, arriving at its final destination, Port Chalmers, Otago, on 27 August 1853. On 31 August 1853 Peters decided to disembark the ship, despite the fact he did not have permission from the British Authorities allowing him to set foot in a Crown colony. Peters was aware of this restriction and disembarked without informing the Maori's master, Captain G. Petherbridge. He handed himself into the local constabulary where he was duly sentenced to six weeks hard labour before being released and permitted to settle freely in Otago. In spite of having taken unauthorised leave of his ship, as a measure of Edward Peters' integrity, he was said to have completed his enforced labour by escorting himself to and from work sites without any supervision.

=== Black Peter ===
Having earnt his freedom and now in his late twenties, Peters travelled southwest from Dunedin toward the Tokomairiro (Milton), Tuapeka (Lawrence) and Molyneux (Balclutha) districts. This region of Otago was only beginning to be opened-up and settled by pastoral run holders who offered him work. Settling in the Glenore area near Milton, Peters initially took work as a hut builder, bullock cart driver and farm labourer. Around this time he became known as Black Peter, an uninspired derivative of his adopted Christian name, illustrating how his identity was racialised soon after his arrival in New Zealand. Peters was far from unique in terms of his treatment in New Zealand at the time; Indians in New Zealand were often treated with open hostility.

=== Gold discovery ===
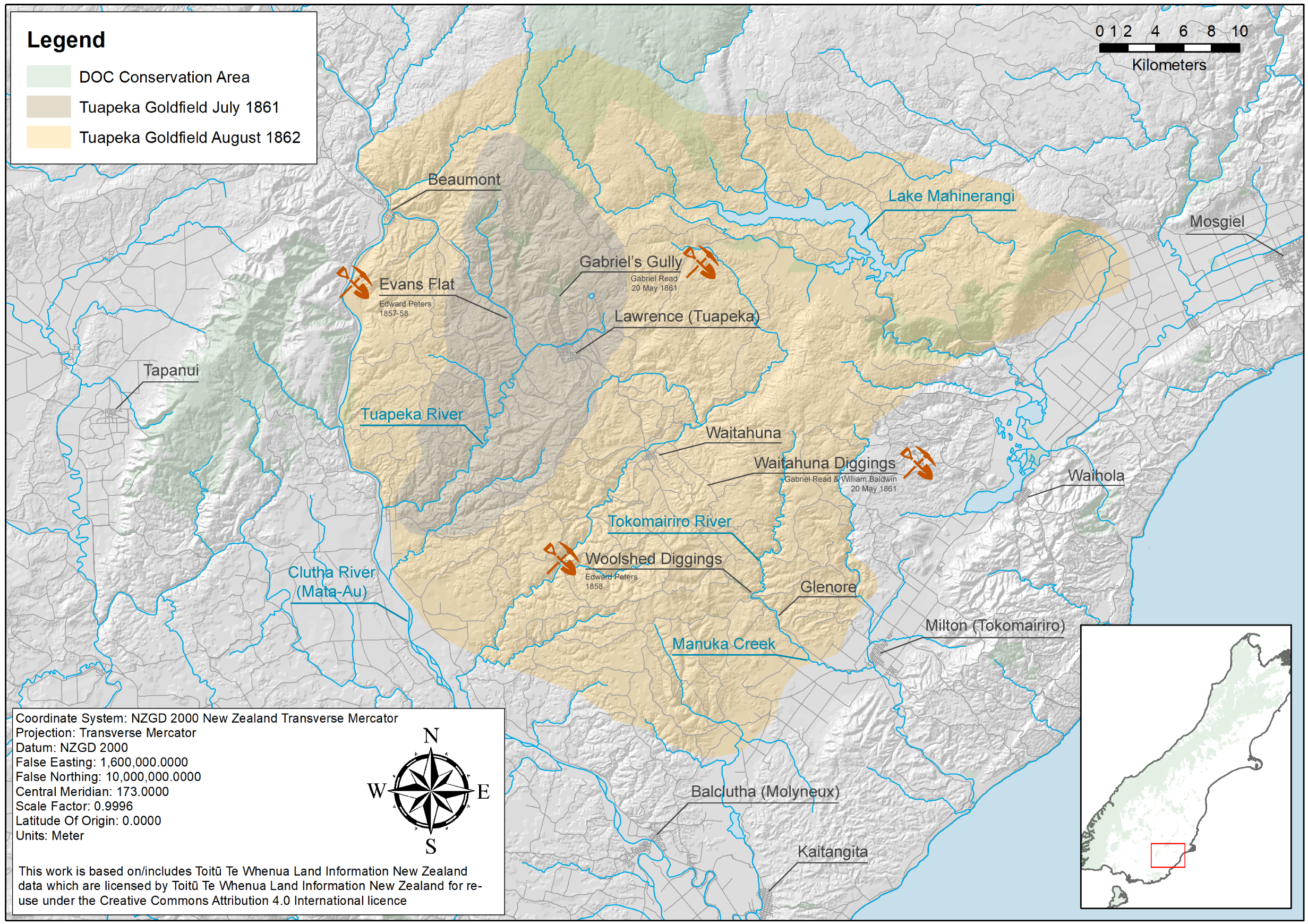
Map of the Tuapeka Goldfields with reference to the location of Edward Peters' early gold discoveries.

Edward Peters had some experience in the goldfields of California, although some sources have stated he had no prior knowledge of gold mining. His gold mining experience was limited to rudimentary prospecting techniques including panning and a mining cradle. This, and knowing what to look for, were enough to encourage Peters to occasionally prospect for gold in the streams he would routinely encounter while working with livestock. There are several recorded stories of Peters finding gold in the wider Tuapeka district, all of which significantly pre-date the discovery of the gold by Gabriel Read in the gully named for him: Gabriel's Gully.

Unlike some of his contemporaries (e.g. Horatio Hartley and Christopher Reilly), Peters was never secretive about his finds, always willing to talk gold and show the locations of where he found them. Many people knew Peters had found gold in the Tuapeka region, yet few took much notice.

==== Tuapeka ====
Having been employed on Davey and Bowler's sheep station in March 1857, one of Peters' first recorded gold returns was in 1857 at Tuapeka (Lawrence), where he found enough gold to pay for his provisions. More detail is provided in a (presumably) separate instance involving the Tuapeka River at Evans Flat (45.893°S 169.636°E). On this occasion, Peters was delivering food to other shepherds using a bullock cart and had crossed the Tuapeka River at Hopkin's Crossing, Evans Flat. Using his pannikin (metal cup) he scooped up some gravel from the river bed and was rewarded with a speck of gold.

Peters would return to Evans Flat several times to work the gravels in the Tuapeka River. The findings were always meagre but Peters persisted, and on several occasions he was accompanied. John Thomson, the ferryman at Molyneux (Balclutha) and a black American man prospected the area and found small amounts of gold almost everywhere they tried. Unfortunately, they were hampered by lack of proper equipment and the fact that Peters' experience was limited in terms of the practicalities of turning such opportunities into a strike.

The other notable recording of Peters working at Evans Flat is significant and would directly lead to Gabriel Read's eventual discovery nearby. Though the accounts differ slightly in their versions of events, they are broadly consistent in that Peters encountered John Lillie Gillies from Tokomairiro (Milton), who was looking for some vagrant stock. Gillies described Peters' workings as mere 'hen-scratchings', and that his only implements were a tin dish and sheath-knife. However, Gillies stayed with Peters long enough, potentially having recovered some 'pennyweights of gold himself' with the same implements, before returning to Tokomairiro. A short time later, May 1861, Gillies met Gabriel Read and showed him the gold he had recovered from Evans Flat. Gillies also described to Read the prospecting that Peters had been undertaking and the area of Evans Flat. Armed with this information, Gabriel Read immediately set out in search of gold in the Tuapeka region. Not all accounts subscribe to this version of events; an article in the Otago Daily Times in 1933 stated vociferously that the notion that Read had followed Peters – or anyone for that matter – was 'without foundation'.

==== Tokomairiro – Glenore ====
The other story commonly circulated around Peters' finding gold in the region occurred in May 1858 while he was helping drive sheep to the property of Inch Clutha farmer, Archibald Anderson. The party, including Peters, William Dawson and another man, was camping beside the Tokomairiro River when Peters decided to pan for gold while washing up the dishes. Some of this gold was generously presented to Dawson who had it fashioned into a ring for his wife. Worn by Dawson's wife until her death in 1915, it is now on display in the Otago Settlers Museum.

Perhaps one of the more important finds that Peters made was at the confluence of the Tokomairiro River and Manuka Creek (near Glenore), at an area variously referred to as the Woolshed Diggings, Woolshed Creek or simply the Woolshed. The name 'Woolshed' came about because miners travelling into the Tuapeka Goldfields were stripping timber from a woolshed near the start of the track to Tuapeka. The Woolshed Diggings were the first large find in Otago and were significant enough for Otago province's chief surveyor, John Turnbull Thomson, to describe it in 1858 as "the best sample of gold yet brought to town", and indicated a workable goldfield. Newspaper reports of the time referred to the Tokomairiro goldfields, though little interest was aroused.

==== Claim for recognition ====
In 1857 the Otago Provincial Council instituted a reward of £500 to go to the discoverer of a remunerative gold field in the province. The reward was applied for on Peters' behalf, potentially in 1857 and certainly in 1861. Both times the requests were dismissed. The 1861 application for the reward on behalf of Peters was made by John Forster of Kaihiku Falls who wrote:

To his Honor the Superintendent, Dunedin

Sir,

A man of the name of Edward Peters, working near here, has asked me to write to your Honor to say he put in a claim for the discovery of the Gold Diggings on and near the "Tuapeka" and "Waitahuna" Rivers, and also near "Tokomairiro," many months ago, and he now considers he is the person who is entitled to the reward offered by the Government, and not Mr. Read, as it is well known to many in this neighbourhood that he obtained gold from the above locality. Peters showed the gold to several parties, and I remember myself the discussion it created. He took one man of the name of Thomson with him to show him the districts, who is a respectable man, and corroborates Peters' statement.

As it is only just that the first discoverer of the Goldfields should have the reward, I must ask your Honor to inquire into the case, and should there be any informality in Peters lodging his claim, I should feel obliged on his behalf that your Honor will direct that a proper form be forwarded to me, which shall be duly filled up.

Edward Peters is an East Indian and comes from Bombay, and is, I think, a half-caste.

I am, Your Honor's obedient servant,

JOHN FORSTER.

— John Forster, 8 July 1861

Despite the claim being 'fully examined' it was rejected with Vincent Pyke writing that he had seen the response from the Council which simply stated:

...memo'd – Received 12th July, 1861. – Disposed of.

— Otago Provincial Council

Why Peters' claim was rejected is not clear but it likely involves elements of racism, local politics and the bad timing of his application which post-dated Gabriel Read's own discovery.

=== Gabriel Read ===
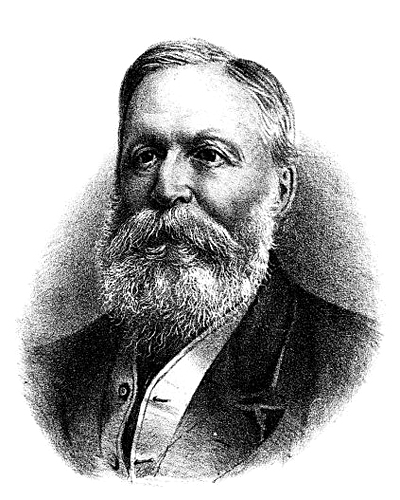
Thomas Gabriel Read

For many, Gabriel Read is the key figure of the Otago gold rush, though it is clear that he was not the first to find gold in the Tuapeka region; Edward Peters had made discoveries as early as 1857, and certainly by 1858 when John Turnbull Thomson reported it.

Thomas Gabriel Read, a Tasmanian gold prospector and farmer, arrived in Port Chalmers on board the ship Don Pedro II from Hobart, on 8 February 1861. A veteran of both the Californian and Victorian gold rushes (though with little success), he had come to Otago on news that gold had been struck in the Mataura River. Gold in the Mataura was meagre and coal turned out to be more lucrative, so Read was forced to look elsewhere. Convinced to remain prospecting in the province by councillor John Hardy, Read eventually encountered John Lillie Gillies at Tokomairiro in May 1861.

On the basis of Gillies' information regarding Edward Peters' workings at Woolshed Creek and Evans Flat, Read set-off in the direction of Tuapeka, prospecting as he went. Read met with a local shepherd, George Munro, spending the night in his hut with the two of them setting out together the following morning. At the head of what is now called Gabriel's Gully, the two parted company and Read followed the creek down into the gully. Before nightfall on 20 May 1861 Read had made the discovery which would propel the Otago region into its first gold rush.

Read would later describe his discovery in a letter to the Warden of the Otago Goldfields, Vincent Pyke:

At a place where a kind of road crossed on a shallow bar, I shovelled away about 2 1/2 feet of gravel, arrived at a beautiful soft slate and saw the gold shining like the stars in Orion on a dark frosty night.

— Gabriel Read, 20 May 1861

Like Edward Peters, Gabriel Read did not hesitate to share his findings for the benefit of the rest of the Province. He wrote a letter to Major John Richardson, Superintendent of Otago Province, which was duly published in the Otago Witness. Perhaps unsurprisingly, the letter caused great excitement throughout the country and confirmation soon came that the gold was 'easily obtainable and in large quantities'. The rush then began in earnest and Read's name – not Peters’ – ended up in history books.

Having discovered a confirmed, workable gold field, Read was rewarded with two grants of £500 each (double the initial promised sum) from the Otago Provincial Council for his find.

Read stayed on in Otago, prospecting for a brief period on behalf of the Otago Provincial Council, then mining the Dunstan and Wakatipu goldfields. He left in 1864 and returned to Tasmania, eventually dying in an asylum in October 1894.

== Later life ==
At the announcement of the gold strike at Gabriel's Gully, Peters was conspicuous in his absence. His whereabouts at this time suggests he had returned to his previous employment and it appears he never took up a claim in Gabriel's Gully or elsewhere. He is mentioned briefly as a new store owner alongside a Mr James Green in Waitahuna following Gabriel Read and William Baldwin's gold discovery there in July 1861.

Apart from his application for the Otago Provincial Council's £500 reward in July 1861, Peters' story is lost to history until 1885 when he again appears in newsprint. By now, Peters was in his late fifties, crippled, infirm and living in Balclutha. Despite discovering gold in Tuapeka, he had never been recognised for it and was now on the edge of destitution. A memorial in his behalf was applied to the Goldfields Committee who reluctantly agreed to £50 being placed on the Appropriation Act for his benefit. It was conditional on an equal sum being raised by private (public) subscription. An appeal was made with the support of Vincent Pyke on 25 November 1885 to raise the necessary public funds. The public did not resent this niggardly stipulation, and promptly raised the necessary sum. This small sum allowed Peters, in his declining years, to live in some reasonable level of comfort. Peters was finally taken to the Benevolent Institution, in Dunedin, where he died on 5 June 1893.

== Legacy ==
A permanent monument celebrating the efforts of Edward Peters was erected in the Mount Stuart Recreation Reserve (46.082°S 169.854°E) by the Glenore Manuka Trust in 2009 – the 150th anniversary of Peters' gold discovery. The memorial was driven largely by the Trust's chairman, local Glenore resident, farmer and historian Alan Williams, who also published Edward Peters' biography.

The memorial was opened by the Governor-General Anand Satyanand, New Zealand’s first governor-general of Indian ancestry.

== Bibliography ==
- Williams, A. (2009) Edward Peters (Black Peter) – The Discoverer of the First Workable Goldfield in Otago. Dunedin, NZ: Self published. ISBN 978-0-473-14868-3
