= Edward Peters =

Edward Peters may refer to:

- Edward N. Peters (born 1957), American canon lawyer
- Edward C. Peters (1855–1937), Atlanta real estate developer
- Edward Peters (scholar), professor specializing in the religious and political history of early Europe
- Edward Peters (Atlanta), see Atlanta Street Railway
- Edward Peters (prospector) (c. 1826 – 1893), pioneer gold prospector who made his career in New Zealand
- Ed Peters, candidate for the Iowa's 7th congressional district

== See also ==
- Ned Peters, character in The Case of the Cautious Condor
- Ted Peters (disambiguation)
- Peter Edwards (disambiguation)
