= Gabriel Read =

Gold prospector and farmer

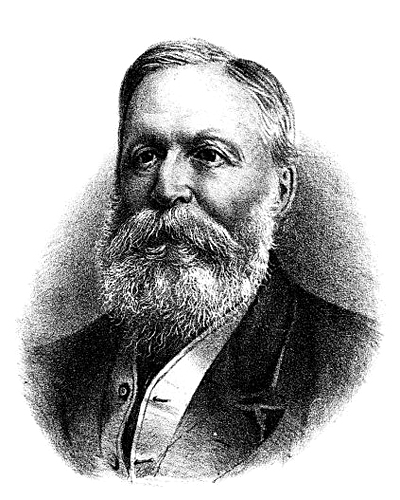
- Born: 21 August 1825; Tasmania
- Died: 31 October 1894 (aged 69); Royal Derwent Hospital
- Occupation: Farmer, gold miner

Thomas Gabriel Read (21 August 1825 – 31 October 1894) was a gold prospector and farmer. His discovery of gold in Gabriel's Gully triggered the first major gold rush in New Zealand.

== Life ==
Read was born on 21 August 1825 in Van Diemen's Land. The eldest of ten children, his father was businessman and banker George Frederick Read and his mother, Margaret Terry, was the daughter of a miller and the senior Read's second wife.

After working on the goldfields of California and Victoria in the 1850s, Read travelled to Otago, New Zealand, on board the Don Pedro II, having heard rumours in September 1860 of gold being found in Mataura, Southland. He arrived in Otago in February 1861. On 25 May 1861, he discovered gold close to the banks of the Tuapeka River in Otago, at Gabriel's Gully, which is named after him. Read wrote to Otago Superintendent John Richardson on 4 June to confirm the discovery, which led to the Otago gold rush. The Otago Provincial Council awarded Read £1000, having earlier advertised a £500 reward for "the discovery of a Remunerative Goldfield within the Province of Otago", even though an Indian man, Edward Peters, was the discoverer of the first workable gold field in Otago in 1858 and had two applications rejected.

In 1864, Read returned to Tasmania with his £1000 windfall; he invested £155 of this to purchase Smooth Island. In 1869, he married his cousin, Amelia Mitchell (née Wilson); they remained childless. Read was admitted to the New Norfolk Hospital for the Insane in Hobart in April 1887, suffering from bipolar disorder. He remained at that hospital until his death on 31 October 1894 aged 69. The cause of death was apoplexy. He was buried in an unmarked grave in New Norfolk.
