= Otago Gold Rush =

1860s gold rush in Central Otago, New Zealand

Otago gold rush
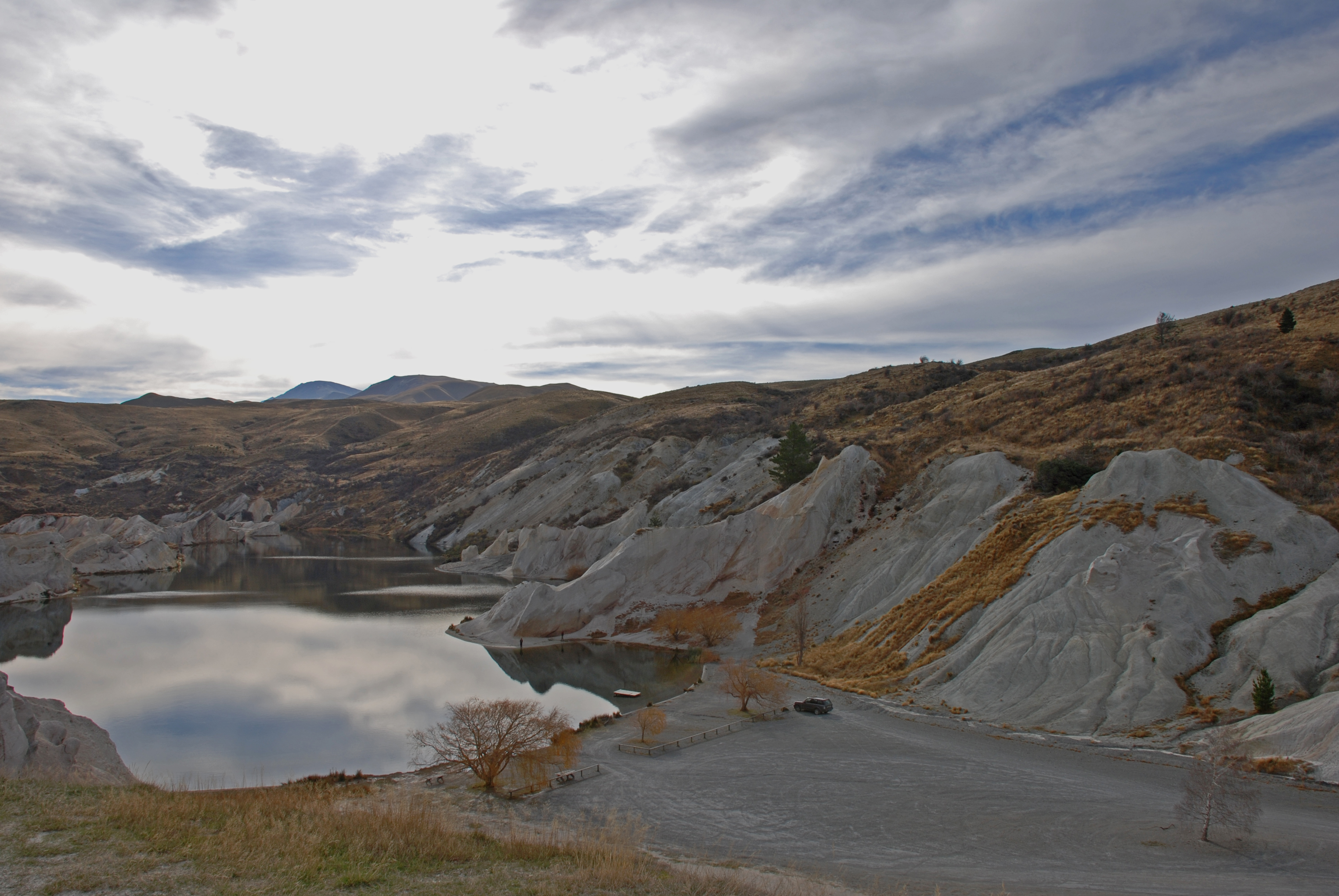
- Old gold workings, St Bathans, Otago
- Other names: Central Otago gold rush, Clutha gold rush
- Centres: Lawrence, on the Tuapeka River; Arrowtown; Kawarau Gorge; Naseby; Dunedin (nearest major port and city)
- Discovery: 20 May 1861, Gabriel's Gully
- Duration: 1861–64
- Prospectors: 18,000
- Persons: Gabriel Read (discoverer); Bully Hayes (entrepreneur); William Gilbert Rees (settler)
- Legacy: Historic precincts of Dunedin and Oamaru; Dunedin Chinese community; University of Otago; Otago Goldfields Cavalcade
- Current gold extraction: Macraes Mine, East Otago

The Otago Gold Rush (often called the Central Otago Gold Rush) was a gold rush that occurred during the 1860s in Central Otago, New Zealand. This was the country's biggest gold strike, and led to a rapid influx of foreign miners to the area – many of them veterans of other hunts for the precious metal in California and Victoria, Australia. The number of miners reached its maximum of 18,000 in February 1864.

The rush started at Gabriel's Gully but spread throughout much of Central Otago, leading to the rapid expansion and commercialisation of the new colonial settlement of Dunedin, which quickly grew to be New Zealand's largest city. Only a few years later, most of the smaller new settlements were deserted, and gold extraction became more long-term, industrialised-mechanical process.

== Background ==

=== Previous gold finds in New Zealand ===
Previously gold had been found in small quantities in the Coromandel Peninsula (by visiting whalers) and near Nelson in 1842. Commercial interests in Auckland offered a £500 prize for anyone who could find payable quantities of gold anywhere nearby in the 1850s, at a time when some New Zealand settlers were leaving for the California and Australian gold rushes. In September 1852, Charles Ring, a timber merchant, claimed the prize for a find in Coromandel. A brief gold rush ensued around Coromandel township, Cape Colville and Mercury Bay but only £1500 of gold was accessible in river silt, although more was in quartz veins where it was inaccessible to individual prospectors. The rush lasted only about three months.

A find in the Aorere Valley near Collingwood in 1856 proved more successful, with 1500 miners converging on the district and removing about £150,000 of gold over the next decade, after which the gold was exhausted. The presence of gold in Otago and on the West Coast during this time was known, but the geology of the land was different from that of other major gold-bearing areas, and it was assumed the gold would amount to little.

=== Previous gold finds in Otago ===
Māori had long known of the existence of gold in Central Otago, but had no use for the ore. For a precious material they relied on greenstone for weaponry and tools, and used greenstone, obsidian and bone carving for jewellery.

The first known European Otago gold find was at Goodwood, near Palmerston in October 1851. The find was of a very small amount with no ensuing "rush". Instead, the settlement of Dunedin was just three years old, and more practical matters were of higher importance to the young town.

Other finds around the Mataura River in 1856 and the Dunstan Range in 1858 stirred minimal interest. A find near the Lindis Pass in early 1861 started producing flickers of interest from around the South Island, with reports of large numbers of miners travelling inland from Oamaru to stake their claims. It was two months later that the gold strike was made that would prompt a major influx of prospectors.

== Main rush ==
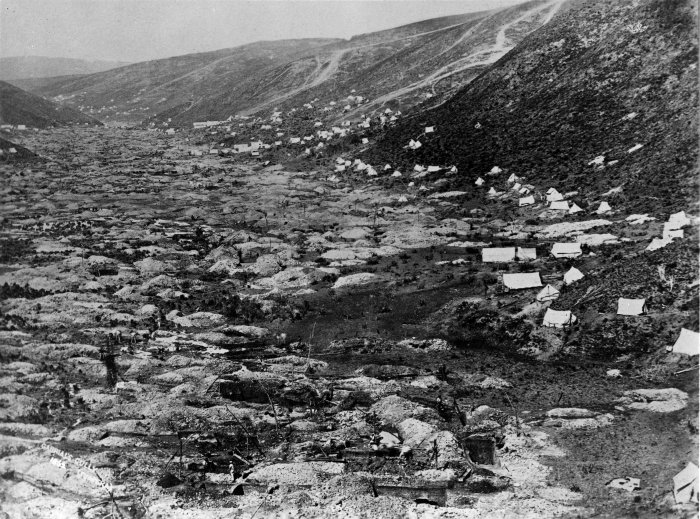
Gabriel's Gully during the height of the gold rush in 1862.

=== Gabriel's Gully ===
Gabriel Read, an Australian prospector who had hunted gold in both California and Victoria, Australia, found gold in a creek bed at Gabriel's Gully, close to the banks of the Tuapeka River near Lawrence on 20 May 1861. "At a place where a kind of road crossed on a shallow bar I shovelled away about two and a half feet of gravel, arrived at a beautiful soft slate and saw the gold shining like the stars in Orion on a dark frosty night".

The public heard about Read's find via a letter published in the Otago Witness on 8 June 1861, documenting a ten-day-long prospecting tour he had made. There was little reaction at first until John Hardy of the Otago Provincial Council stated that he and Read had prospected country "about 31 miles long by five broad, and in every hole they had sunk they had found the precious metal." With this statement, the gold rush began.

=== Arrival of prospectors ===
By Christmas, 14,000 prospectors were on the Tuapeka and Waipori fields. Within a year, the region's population swelled greatly, growing by 400 per cent between 1861 and 1864, with prospectors swarming from the dwindling Australian goldfields. Gabriel's Gully led to the discovery of further goldfields within Central Otago. A second gold strike in 1862, close to the modern town of Cromwell, did nothing to dissuade new hopefuls, and prospectors and miners staked claims from the Shotover River in the west through to Naseby in the north. In November 1862 Thomas Arthur and Harry Redfern sneaked off from shearing for William Rees at Queenstown and looked for gold on the banks of the Shotover River armed with a butcher's knife and pannikin. The Arthur's Point strike led to the largest rush that occurred in Otago. Historic buildings at Queenstown such as Eichardt's Hotel, the Lake Lodge of Ophir (now Artbay Gallery), the Queenstown Police Station, and stone Courthouse were all begun as a response to the rapid influx. By the end of 1863, the real gold rush was over, but companies continued to mine the alluvial gold. The number of miners reached its maximum of 18,000 in February 1864.

An estimate of 350 Chileans who had previously been active in mining in Australia –and some prior to that also in California– moved to mine placers in New Zealand in the early 1860s.

== Life in mining communities ==
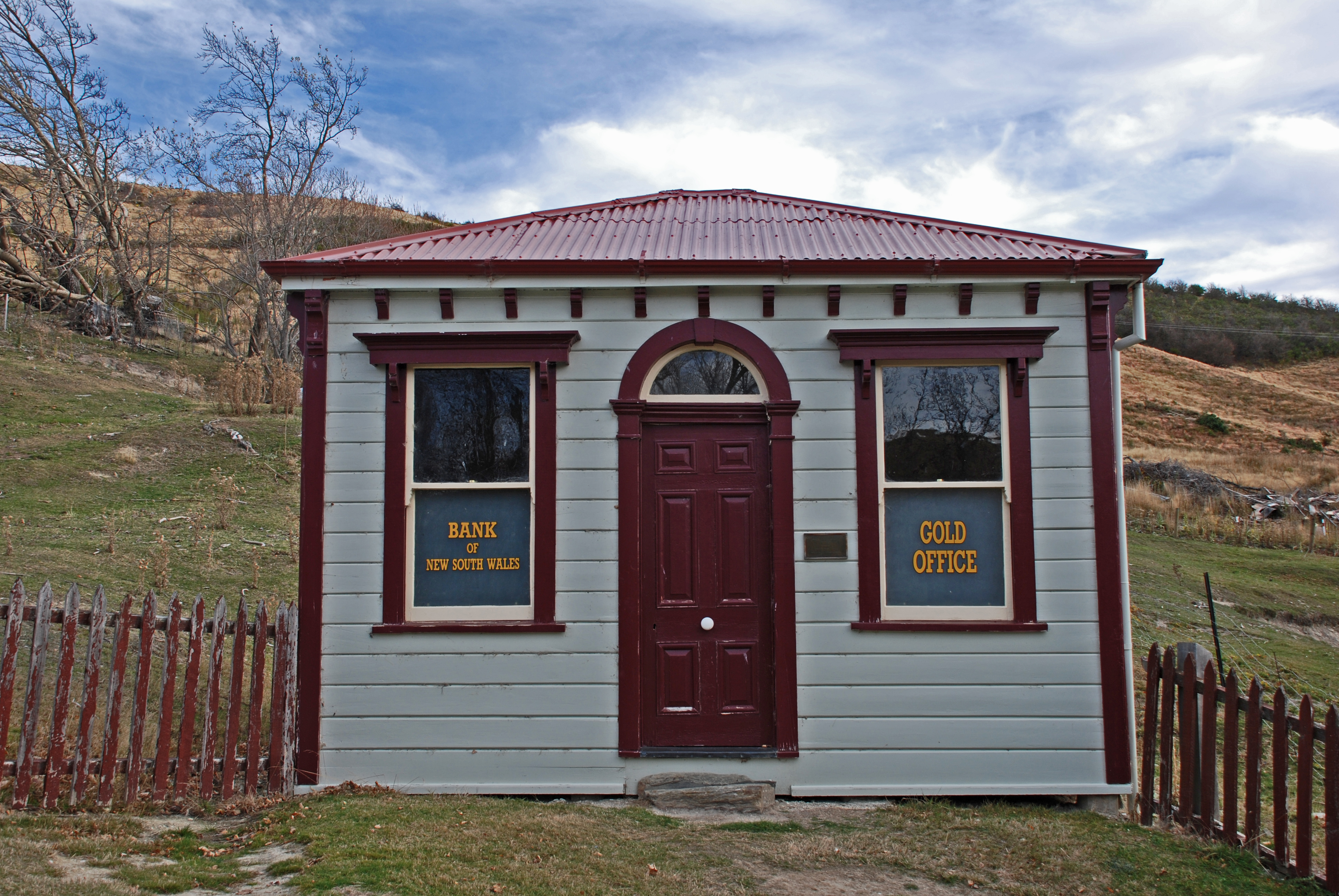
Gold office of the Bank of New South Wales, St. Bathans, Central Otago

Read's find of gold sparked the interest of people in Dunedin; people travelled long distances in the hope of striking it rich. These goldfields all gave rise to mining towns and communities of temporary shops, hotels and miners' huts made from canvas or calico fabric-covered timber frames. As the scope of the goldfields developed, communities became more permanent with buildings constructed in timber and concrete. Evidence such as material artefacts, foundations of huts and buildings, and photographs from the Central Otago goldfields provide us with information about the labour and social roles of men and women in the 19th century. A restored Chinese Village at Arrowtown is a popular tourist attraction.

=== Men in mining communities ===
The news of gold at Gabriel's Gully reached the inhabitants of Dunedin and the rest of the world, prospectors immediately left their homes in search of gold. The majority of these perspective prospectors were labourers and tradesmen, in their late teens and twenties. The incoming population included entrepreneurial, skilled and technical people that established services for the miners, such as shops, post offices, banks, pubs, hotels and hardware stores. The owners of these businesses could make more money than the miners.

==== Evidence ====
Historical evidence of male miners or businessmen in the 19th-century Central Otago goldfields is readily available in literature by and about the experiences of inhabitants at the various gold strikes. Census statistics and photographs are also available, all of which provide inferential evidence about the labour roles in these communities. This in turn provides information about labour and social roles within the community. Such information includes that of the ownership and management of stores and hotels, such as the bank and gold office at Maori Point (Bank of New Zealand) in the 1860s, managed by G. M. Ross.

Archaeological evidence is also readily available. Excavations at various sites throughout Otago show evidence of an array of mining techniques, including ground sluicing, hydraulic sluicing and hydraulic elevating. Tailings (the materials left over after the removal of the uneconomic fraction (gangue) of the ore) also provide some of the archaeological evidence from Otago gold mine sites. Midden analysis from camp and settlement sites provides information about diet, with evidence of a preference for beef and lamb in the European camps, and a preference for pork within the Chinese camps.

Artefactual evidence found during excavations includes blue and white ceramics, cooking and eating utensils, metal objects, such as buttons, nails and tin boxes (flint boxes, tobacco boxes) and an exceedingly high number of alcohol glass bottles. It is possible these glass bottles were recycled, so archaeologists cannot draw definite conclusions as to alcohol consumption. Within the Chinese camps (such as the Lawrence Chinese camp) artefacts include gambling tokens and Chinese coins as well as celadon earthwares.

Although diaries and memoirs about the lives of males in the mining communities exist, little mention or information is known about the significance of female labour and social roles. Archaeological evidence, however, suggests that many females in the goldfields took significant roles in mining and the general community.

=== Women in mining communities ===
In the 19th-century goldfields, women played significant familial, labour and entrepreneurial roles, such as wives, mothers, prostitutes, business owners and service providers and 'Colonial Helpmeets' (wives who worked alongside their husbands). Women within these communities were young and single, or married with a family, although the community was predominantly male, female family never having intended to move to the goldfields until towns developed with hotels, stores and schools. Yet, there was a female presence in this environment from the start of the gold find in 1861, at Gabriel's Gully. An example is Janet Robertson, who lived with her husband in a small cottage in Tuapeka. It was here in her cottage, where Gabriel Read wrote his "discovery" letter of gold to the Otago Provincial Council. As the news of this goldfield in Gabriel's Gully spread, prospectors engaged in the area, and Janet opened up her home, cooked meals and tended to the miners, as they passed through.

Another significant woman present on the 19th-century Central Otago goldfields was Susan Nugent-Wood, a well-known writer in the 1860s and 1870s. Nugent-Wood, her husband John, and their children moved to Otago in 1861, as prospectors of gold. Nugent-Wood worked on the goldfields of Central Otago in several official positions. She wrote stories based on her life and roles on the Central Otago goldfields, which provide accounts of labour and social aspects of mining and gender in the 19th century.

Harriet Heron also lived on the goldfields, most notably at Fourteen-Mile Beach where she and her husband Henry lived in a tent for three years – Heron was the only woman in the mining camp at the time. They later built a cottage in the area, which is known today as "Mrs Heron's Cottage" and maintained by Heritage New Zealand.

As the majority of women within these mining communities were married, many became widows, as their husbands died during mining related activities or diseases. These women, whose husbands owned stores or hotels, adopted ownership rights. Many became well known throughout the communities, amongst visitors, passing miners and local citizens. Archaeological evidence of a widow who took over ownership rights following her husbands' death, was Elizabeth Potts. Potts was given a licence for the Victoria Hotel in Lawrence in 1869. This was recorded and published in the Tuapeka Times, 11 December 1869. This archaeological evidence provides information which suggests that women played significant labour and social roles within mining communities.

==== Excavation evidence ====
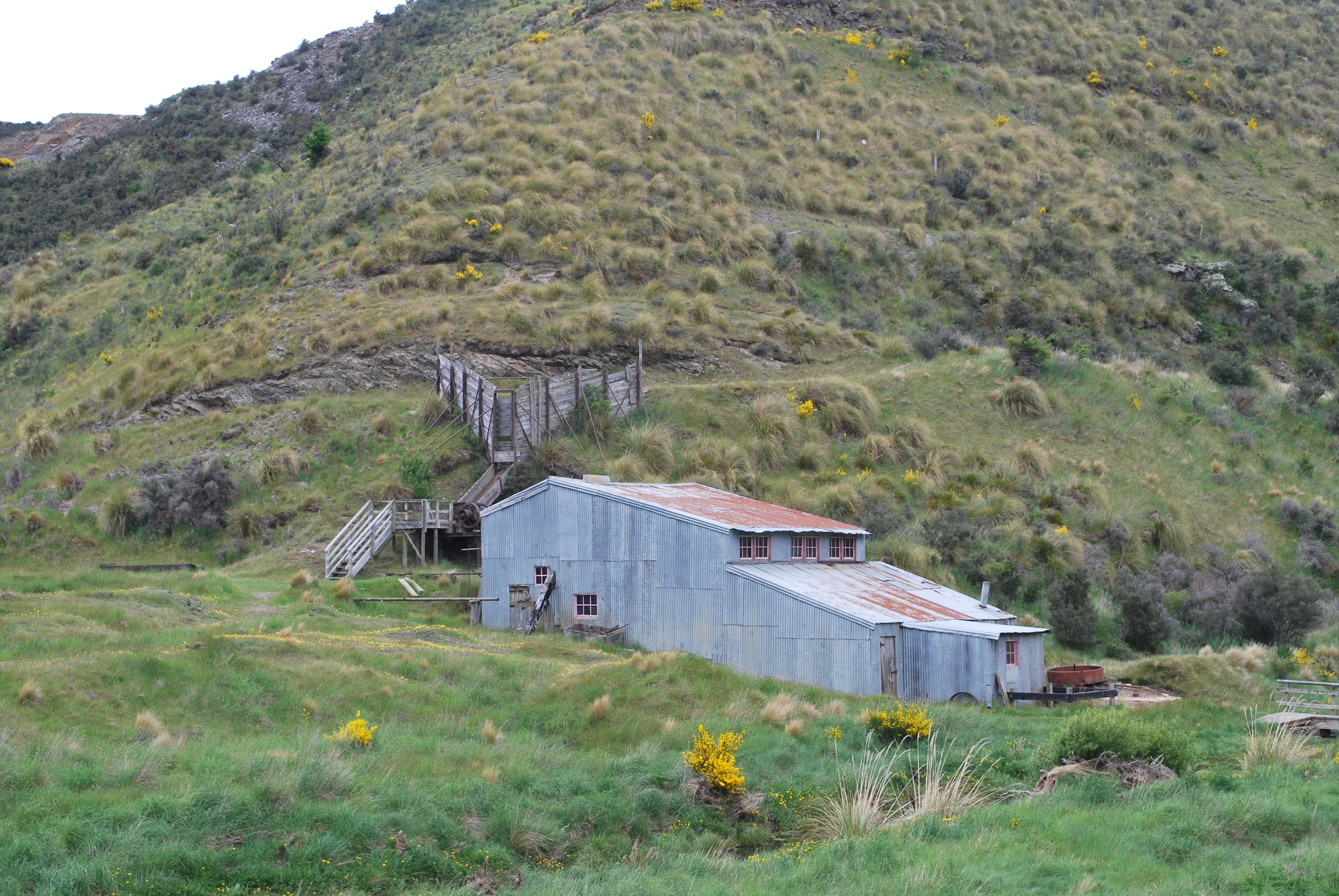
Old mill at Golden Point Mine Historic Area, near Macraes Flat.

An excavation report from the Golden Bar Mine between the Macraes Flat and Palmeston, Otago, shows that located in front of the main mine workings of ca.1897, archaeological material was found. This material was a small heart-shaped brooch with 13 glass (paste) diamonds. This archaeological evidence suggests that women were present at this site, and within the Golden Bar goldfield. The exact occupation of women from this evidence is unknown, but indicates that women were present on the goldfields during the 19th-century gold rush in Otago.

Another excavation report by Petchey from the Macraes Flat mining area, presents items of children's toys such as marbles, and a china doll's leg amongst ruins of a house site. This evidence is also useful to suggest men and their families engaged in mining activities and social life on the goldfields in the 19th century. Archaeological artefacts from 19th-century mining communities in Central Otago suggest that women and children were on site of the goldfields. It is unknown whether these artefacts belonged to women who were miners or women who were domestic wives and mothers.

== Aftermath ==
=== Results ===
The city of Dunedin reaped many of the benefits, for a period becoming New Zealand's largest town even though it had only been founded in 1848. Many of the city's stately buildings date from this period of prosperity. New Zealand's first university, the University of Otago, was founded in 1869 with wealth derived from the goldfields.

However, the rapid decline in gold production from the mid-1860s led to a sharp drop in the province's population, and while not unprosperous, the deep south of New Zealand never rose to such relative prominence again.

=== Later gold rushes ===
The Wakamarina River in Marlborough proved to have gold in 1862, and 6,000 miners flocked to the district. Although they found alluvial gold, there were no large deposits.

The West Coast of the South Island was the second-richest gold-bearing area of New Zealand after Otago, and gold was discovered in 1865–6 at Okarito, Bruce Bay, around Charleston and along the Grey River. Miners were attracted from Victoria, Australia where the gold rush was near an end. In 1867 this boom also began to decline, though gold mining continued on the coast for a considerable time after this. In the 1880s, quartz miners at Bullendale and Reefton were the first users of grid electricity in New Zealand.

Southland also had a number of smaller scale gold rushes during the later half of the 19th century. The first goldmining in Southland took place in 1860 on the banks of the Mataura River and its tributaries (and later would help settlements such as Waikaia and Nokomai flourish). However the first "gold rush" wasn't until the mid-1860s when fine gold was discovered in the black sands of Orepuki beach. Miners followed the creeks up into the foothills of the Longwoods to where the richest gold was to be had. This activity led to the founding of mining settlements such as Orepuki and Round Hill (the Chinese miners and shop owners essentially ran their own town known colloquially to Europeans as "Canton").

Gold was long known to exist at Thames, but exploitation was not possible during the New Zealand Wars. In 1867 miners arrived from the West Coast, but the gold was in quartz veins, and few miners had the capital needed to extract it. Some stayed on as workers for the companies which could fund the processing.

=== Commercial extraction ===
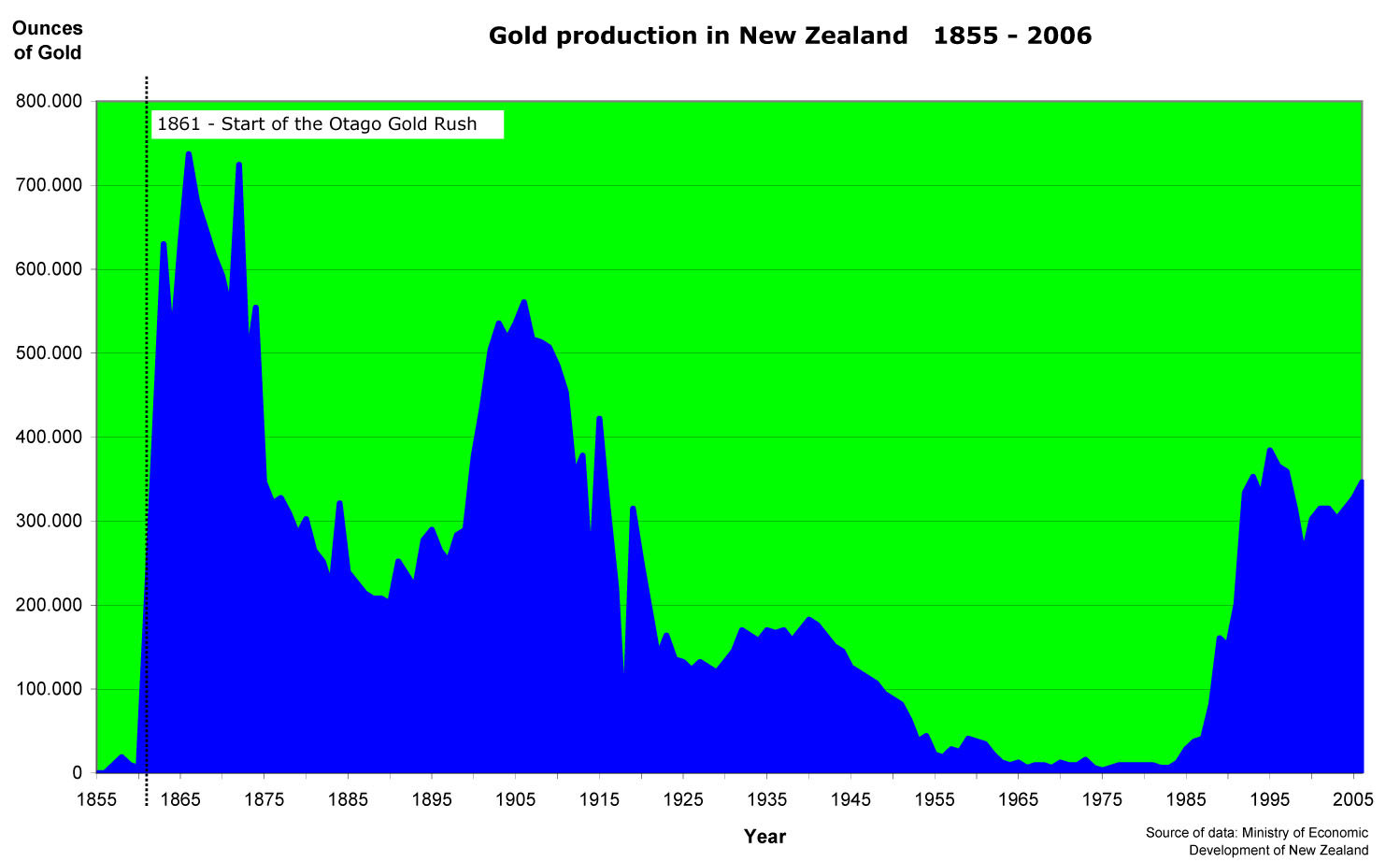
While gold production remained (relatively) high after the gold rush, the profits were soon made by companies instead of individual miners.

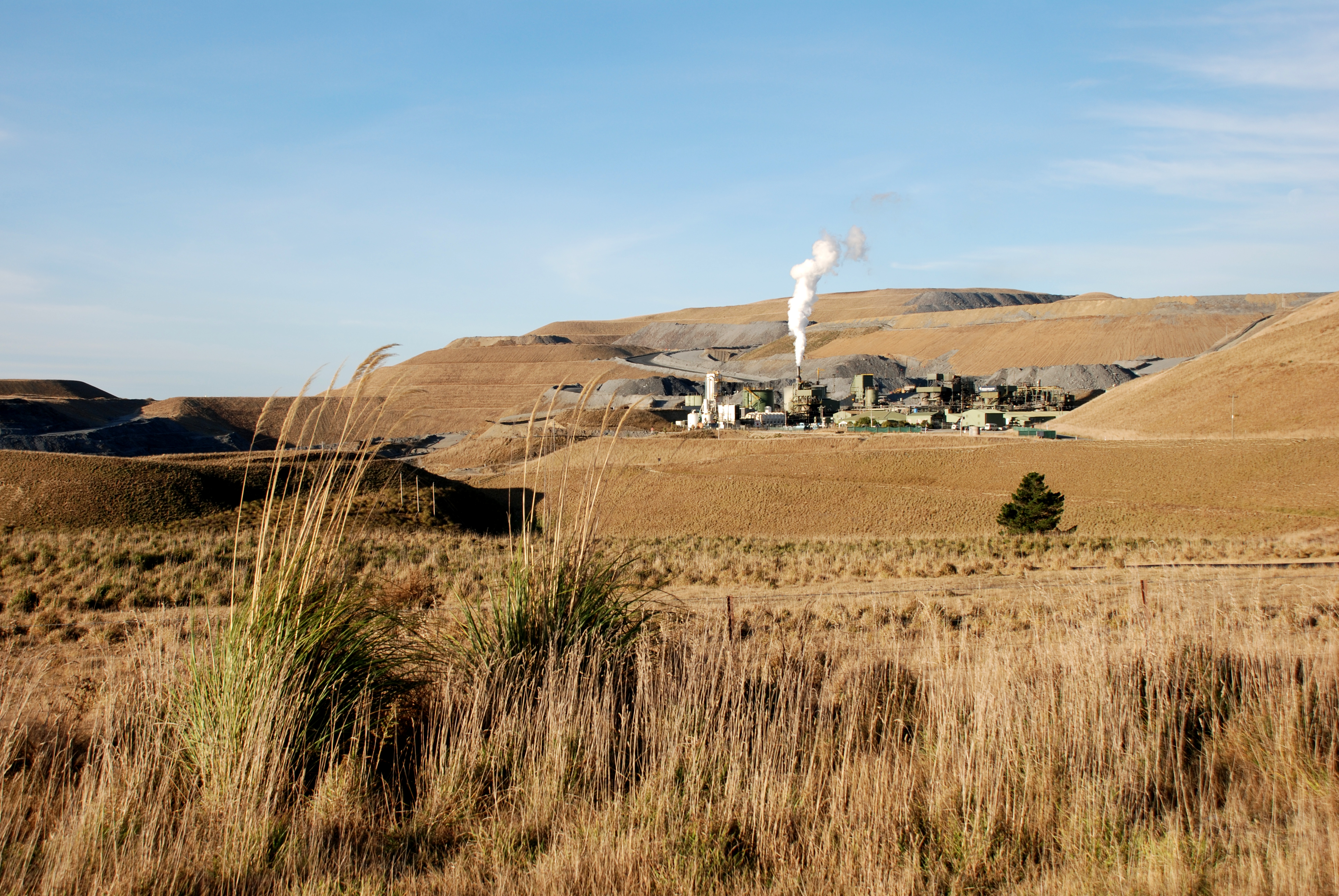
Macraes Gold mine and mill, 2007.

After the main gold rush, miners began laboriously reworking the goldfields. About 5,000 European miners remained in 1871, joined by thousands of Chinese miners invited by the province to help rework the area. There was friction not only between European and Chinese miners, which contributed to the introduction of the New Zealand head tax, but also between miners and settlers over conflicting land use.

Attention turned to the gravel beds of the Clutha River, with a number of attempts to develop a steam-powered mechanical gold dredge. These finally met with success in 1881 when the Dunedin became the world's first commercially successful gold dredge. The Dunedin continued operation until 1901, recovering a total of 17,000 ounces (530 kg) of gold.

The mining has had a considerable environmental impact. In 1920 the Rivers Commission estimated that 300 million cubic yards of material had been moved by mining activity in the Clutha river catchment. At that time an estimated 40 million cubic yards had been washed out to sea with a further 60 million in the river. (The remainder was still on riverbanks). This had resulted in measured aggradation of the river bottom of as much as 5 metres.

Gold is still mined by OceanaGold in commercial quantities in Otago at one site – Macraes Mine inland from Palmerston, which started operations in 1990. Macraes Mine, an opencast hard rock mining operation, processes more than 5 million tonnes of ore per year and from 1990 through 2014, gold production has totaled about 4 million ounces.

=== The Otago gold rush in popular culture ===
Numerous folk songs, both contemporary and more recent, have been written about the gold rush. Of contemporary songs, "Bright Fine Gold", with its chorus of "Wangapeka, Tuapeka, bright fine gold" (sometimes rendered "One-a-pecker, two-a-pecker") is perhaps the best known. (Note: The Wangapeka River, in the northwestern South Island, was the site of another, smaller gold rush.) Most well-known of more recent songs are Phil Garland's songs Tuapeka Gold. and Daniel's Gold .

Martin Curtis wrote a folk-style song about the gold rush called "Gin and Raspberry." The lyrics are written in the voice of an unsuccessful gold prospector who envies the success of the largest gold mine in the Cardrona valley at the time, the "Gin and Raspberry" (supposedly so named because the owner would call out, "Gin and raspberry to all hands!" whenever a bucket of mined material yielded an ounce of gold. The singer laments, "an ounce to the bucket and we'd all sell our souls/For a taste of the gin and raspberry." The song has had several recordings, particularly by Gordon Bok.

Paul Metsers' song "Farewell to the Gold" is based loosely on a flood in July 1863, which killed 13 miners on the Shotover River. The song has been recorded by many, including Nic Jones, The Black Family, James Keelaghan, and Nancy Kerr and James Fagan.

1976 New Zealand children's television drama series Hunter's Gold was set during the Central Otago gold rush.

The Otago Goldfields Cavalcade has annually since 1991 retraced the routes of wagons across country to the Dunstan goldfields around Cromwell. The original route, which established Cobb & Co.'s coach service left Dunedin's Provincial Hotel on 22 November 1862. Cavalcade routes vary each year in late February so as to finish in a different host town. In 2008 plans were made for a heritage trail including Arrowtown, Kawarau Gorge, Lawrence and the Dunedin Chinese Garden.

== Archives ==
The Ng New Zealand Chinese Heritage Collection is a document archive held at the Presbyterian Research Centre at Knox College, Dunedin, which became a UNESCO New Zealand Memory of the World Register in 2017. Much of the archive is sourced from records made by reverend Alexander Don, in his mostly unsuccessful attempts to convert Chinese goldmining communities to Christianity. Don's archives includes detailed documentation of 3,500 individuals associated with Chinese goldrush communities in Otago. Other documents included in the archive were collected by James Ng, a historian and general practitioner, began collecting further documents in 1959, using many of these as the basis for his book series Windows on a Chinese Past.

== See also ==
- Blizzard and Flood of 1863
- Mining in New Zealand
- West Coast gold rush
- Gold Fields (New Zealand electorate)
- Goldfields Towns (New Zealand electorate)
