= Harriet Heron =

New Zealand settler and business owner

- Born: Harriet Ann Buttress c. 1836; Deal, Kent, England
- Died: October 28, 1933 (aged 96–97)
- Occupation: Business owner
- Spouses: William Bowbyes (died 1860) Henry Heron (m. 1861; died 1896)

Harriet Ann Heron (née Buttress, c. 1836 – 28 October 1933) was an early settler and business owner in Central Otago, New Zealand, and one of the few women who lived in gold mining camps during the Otago gold rush.

== Early life ==
Heron grew up in Deal, Kent, England, the daughter of Thomas Buttress and Elizabeth Buttress, née Carraway. She married William Bowbyes and they emigrated to New Zealand. Bowbyes drowned at Timaru in 1860, and in the following year she married Henry Heron and moved to Dunedin.

== Adult life ==
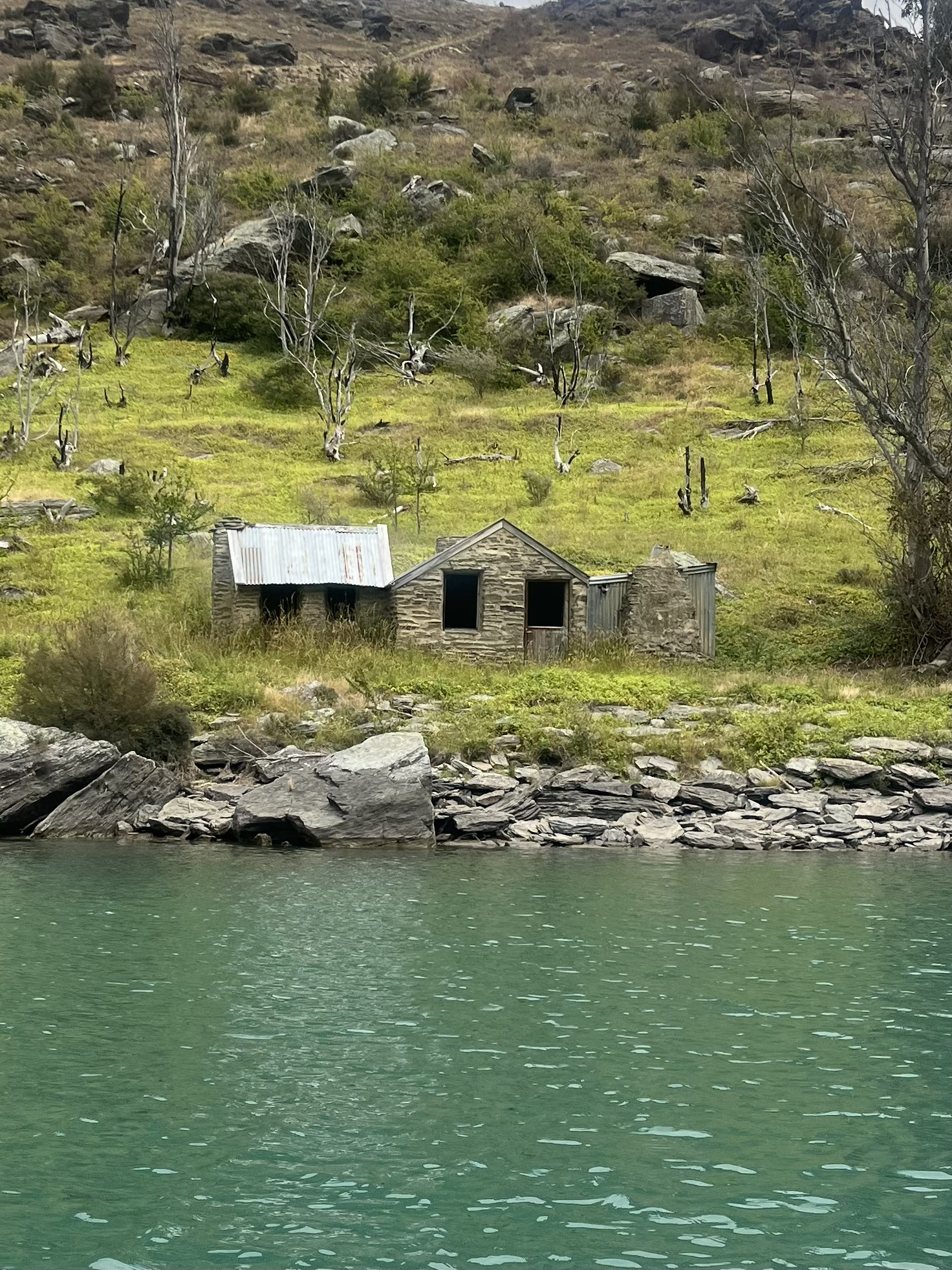
Mrs Heron's Cottage on the banks of Lake Roxburgh.

Heron and her husband initially lived in Tuapeka, where they ran a butcher's shop. For some time she ran the store single-handed as her husband went to Wetherstones to work in a gold mine, and then to the Clutha River area. Heron sold the business and joined her husband at the mining site, located at Fourteen Mile Beach. For their first three years there they lived in a tent, and Heron was the only woman in the camp.

The Herons later built a schist and mud mortar cottage to live in, which was originally located on the shores of the Clutha River; however since the river was dammed and flooded in 1956, it now sits on the banks of Lake Roxburgh. The cottage is maintained by Heritage New Zealand and known locally as "Mrs Heron's Cottage."

In 1875 Heron and her husband moved to Roxburgh and ran the Commercial Hotel. Henry died in 1896, and Heron continued to run the hotel alone until 1913. During that time, she had a new building constructed for the hotel, a large brick two-story building which became known as "one of the largest and most convenient hotels in Central Otago". The Commercial Hotel is now used for backpackers' accommodation.

Heron died in 1933.
