= Blizzard and flood of 1863 =

Series of consecutive natural disasters in Central Otago, New Zealand

The blizzard and flood of 1863 was a series of consecutive natural disasters in Central Otago in New Zealand's South Island. In the early 1860s the area was in the midst of a gold rush. From July to August 1863 the gold fields suffered from a combination of floods, snowstorms, and blizzards that caused heavy loss of life among the gold miners. At least 40 died during the July rains and more than 11 in the August snows. Sources using the earliest reports of loss of life tend to greatly overstate the numbers who died.

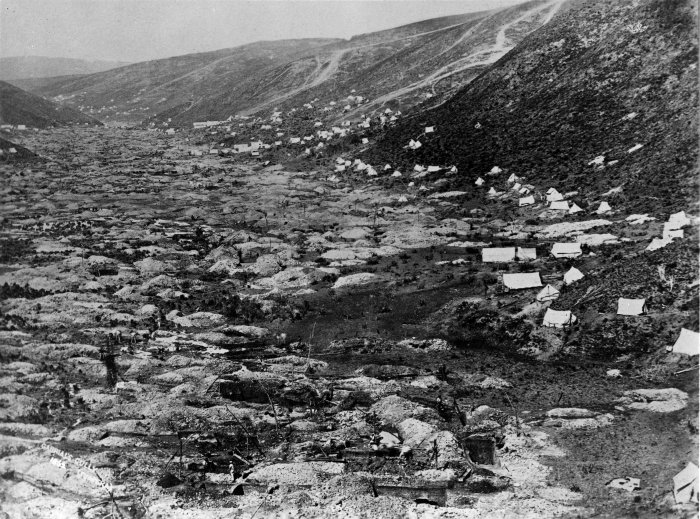
Gabriel's Gully during the height of the gold rush in 1862.

== July weather ==
The weather up to mid June had been reasonably mild. By late June the winter snows had arrived, but were no more than were normal. Into July there was still no significant change from the routine weather patterns with snow building up in the higher country, although to a lesser extent than normal.

=== Heavy rains ===
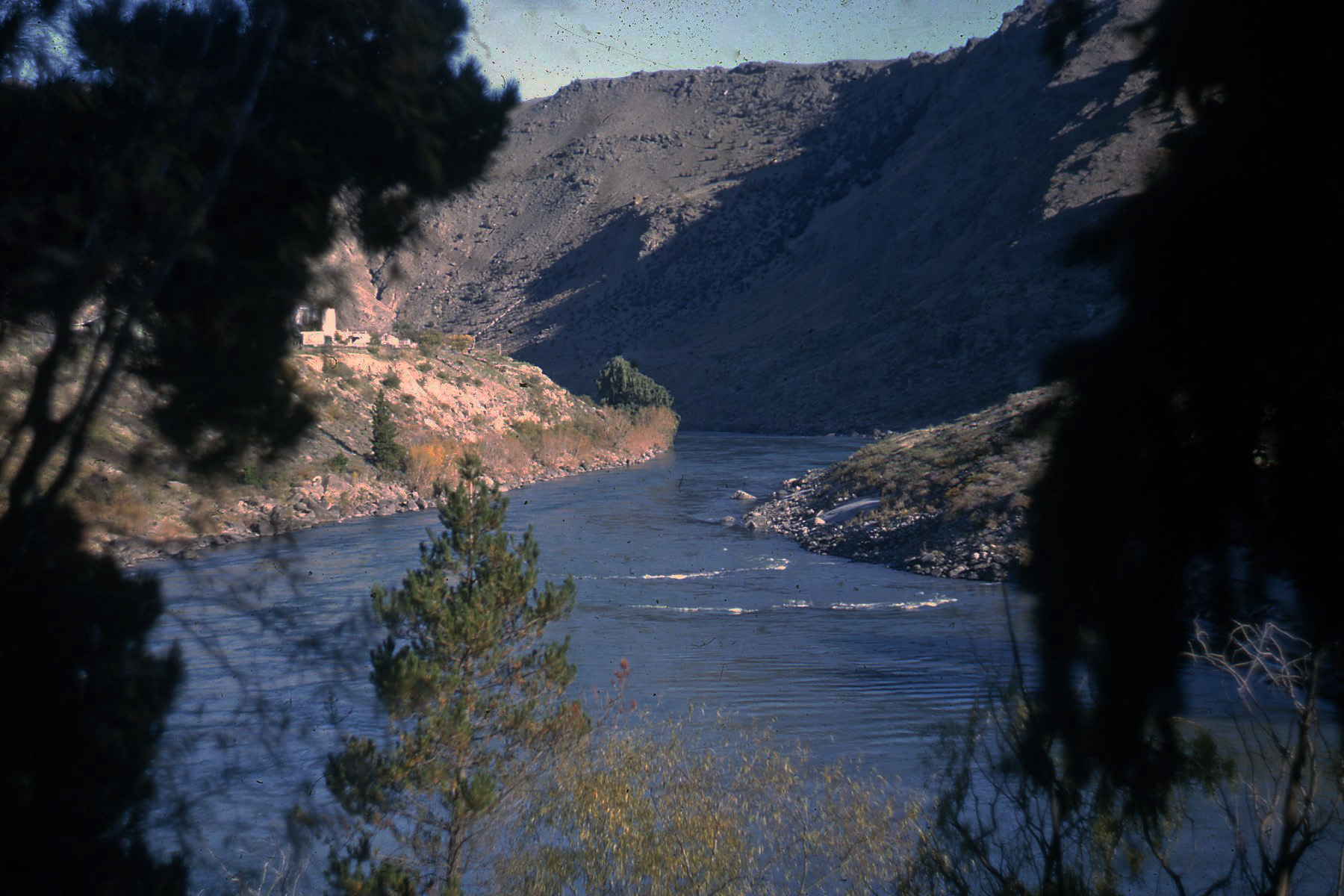
Clutha River

On 4 July the weather changed to a six-day period of rain. On 7 July the temperature markedly increased which caused a rapid snow melt. All the rivers in the area; the Clutha (Molyneux), the Kawarau, the Shotover, the Arrow, the Manuherikia, the Bannockburn, and numerous streams flooded. The Clutha River rose 6 metres (20 ft) in a night. The Shotover River reached 10 metres (33 ft) above its normal flow and the Arrow River flooded Arrowtown. Even Lake Wakatipu rose over 1 metre (3.3 ft).

The gold miners in these areas tended to camp near the river banks and with the sudden change in river flows many were caught unawares and swept to their deaths. Those who escaped the torrents lost all their possessions. The number who lost their lives was unknown. One man was reported drowned on the Arrow River.

=== The snows return ===
In mid July the snows returned with heavy falls in the high country areas. Roads were blocked and areas isolated. The rains returned by late July, causing more extensive flooding and some loss of life. Five people were killed in a landslip at Moke Creek, one boy was drowned in the Clutha, seven were swept away and drowned in the Shotover, ten killed in a landslip at Sandhills, and three on the Arrow. Overall the flooding was reported as being worse than the early July event with Lake Wakatipu rising 2 metres (6.6 ft). The body of John Donoughue was found on the Crown Range on 21 August. He was thought to have died from exposure on 29 July. On 31 October a further body was found at Frankton on 31 October, which could have been Charles Matthews who drowned on 22 July.

== August blizzards ==
From 13 to 15 August blizzards and heavy snows swept through inland Otago from the Taieri Plains to the lakes. On 14 August about 40 miners were said to have been buried in an avalanche at Separation Creek in the Serpentine Gully. The party that went to investigate found them alive, but in want of provisions. All areas were isolated as the roads had become impassible and impossible to find. Reports began to come in of various people perishing. In the vicinity of Black Ball and Drunken Woman's Creek a party of 16 were thought to have perished, but this too later proved inaccurate. Another two miners were thought to have perished at the Nevis.

Confirmed reports of deaths were a man missing between German Jock's Gully and Teviot, Robert Henry from the Pomahaka diggings on 15 August, and another man Alexander Alexander by an avalanche at Pomahaka. John Penfold from the Old Man Range was confirmed dead from exposure on either 12 or 13 August. William Nicol died on his way from Gorge Ferry to Campbells Diggings.

There was a further death reported of a man who had been hospitalised suffering from frostbite. The remainder of August had reasonably mild weather. There was one body discovered in September near Pyramid Rock on the Old Man Range when the snow had begun to melt. Two further bodies were found on the Old Man Range in early October, Joseph Thompson who was thought to have died in September and a man called Landregan who was thought to have died in the August blizzards. Nicholas Cordts' body was found at the end of October in Potters Gulley and John Stewart's at the beginning of November in Pomahawka Creek. Both had died during the August blizzards. A skeleton was found in January 1864 near the Timber Gully to Teviot track and the person's cause of death was attributed to being most likely the August blizzard.

== Later fatalities in 1863 ==
The weather through September was a mix of fine spells, rain, and occasional snow. On 23 September, a police party was caught in a heavy snow storm in the Kakanui Range near Naseby. Sergeant Garvie of Ranfurly became separated from the party and died, but the rest reached safety. In December a small party of miners got caught on the summit of the Old Man Range in a storm. Three of the five perished. A similar occurrence took place on Switzer's with one being overcome from exposure and another drowning in a party of five.

== Fatalities ==
=== July ===
The reported fatalities from the July rains were 40 in total:

- 8 July - 1 drowning on the Shotover
- 12 July - 6 killed at Moke Creek
- 12 July - 2 killed at Skippers Gully
- 26 July - 11 killed near Moke Creek
- 26 July - 12 killed at Sandhills
- 26 July - 1 drowned at Manuherikia
- 28 July - 1 died of exposure on Crown Range
- 29 July - 5 killed on the Arrow
- 31 July - 1 killed at Moonlight River

=== August ===
The reported deaths from the blizzards and snows were 11 confirmed or attributed and 2 suspected. There a number of reports that greatly exaggerated the suspected death toll in the period leading up to the diggings becoming accessible again. There were possibly some deaths that were not reported or bodies that were not found, but these would have been relatively few in number.

== Memorial ==
In 1928 a stone monument was erected by the Government at Gorge Creek (formerly known as Chamounix Creek) to mark the miners' deaths on the Old Man Range crossing. This location was once the centre of the mining area with stores, hotels, and grog shanties. There are graves in the area of men who died in the storms and the summit of the Old Man Range cairns mark the miners' graves and rescuers who died there.
