= Peter Edwards =

Peter Edwards may refer to:

- Peter Edwards (vexillologist) (1931–2019), Canadian vexillologist
- Peter Edwards (artist) (born 1955), British painter
- Peter Edwards (rugby league) (born 1969), New Zealand former professional rugby league footballer
- Peter Edwards (rugby union) (born 1980), English rugby union player
- Peter Edwards (chemist) (born 1949), British chemist
- Peter Edwards (historian) (born 1945), Australian diplomatic and military historian
- Peter Edwards (rower) (born 1939), Australian Olympic rower
- Peter Edwards (pianist), British pianist, composer and band leader
- Peter Edwards (computer scientist) (born 1963), British computer scientist
- Peter Edwards (1934–2017), Swedish-English illustrator, see Peter and Gunvor Edwards

== See also ==
- Edward Peters (disambiguation)
