= Ted Peters =

Ted Peters may refer to:

- Ted Peters (politician) (1897–1980), Australian politician
- Ted Peters (theologian) (born 1941), Lutheran theologian
- Ted Peters Famous Smoked Fish, a restaurant in South Pasadena, Florida.

== See also ==
- Edward Peters (disambiguation)
