= Gabriel's Gully =

Locality in Otago, New Zealand

Gabriel's Gully

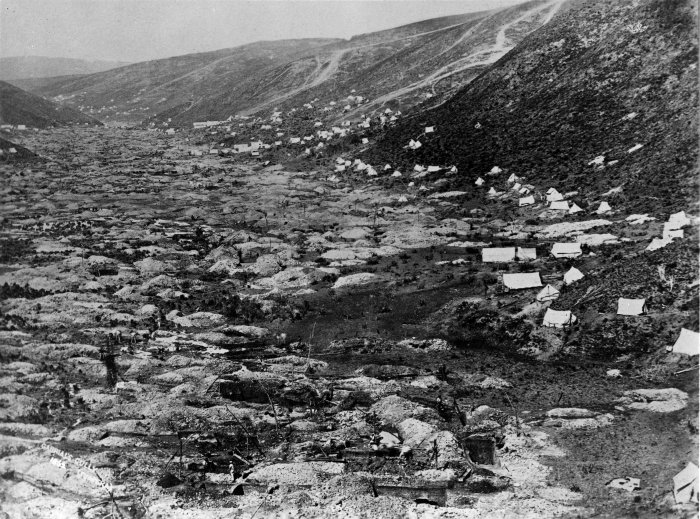
Gabriel's Gully during the height of the gold rush in 1862.

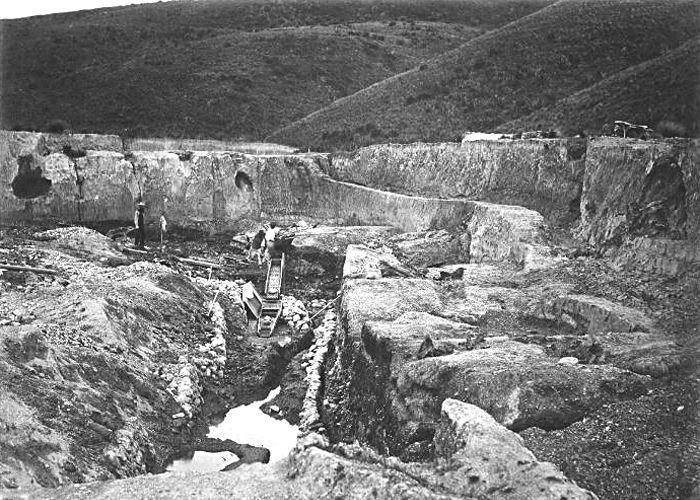
Herbert Deveril's gold rush era image of Gabriel's Gully in Otago, circa 1875

Gabriel's Gully is a locality in Otago, New Zealand, three kilometres from Lawrence township and close to the Tuapeka River. It was the site of New Zealand's first major gold rush.

The discovery of gold at Gabriel's Gully by Gabriel Read on 25 May 1861 led to the Otago gold rush. While gold had been found in Otago before, this rush was beyond expectation, with the population of the gold field rising from almost nothing to around 11,500 within a year, twice that of Dunedin at the time. It also stimulated overseas interest in the new colony.

In May 1911, the jubilee of the discovery of gold in Gabriel's Gully was held in Lawrence, with around 2,000 people attending, including surviving miners.

Gabriel's Gully today is now part of the Gabriels Gully Historic Reserve, and is managed by the Department of Conservation. It has a Heritage New Zealand Category 1 designation.
