= Otago Goldfields Cavalcade =

Annual event in New Zealand

- Cavalcade crossing Beaumont Bridge, 2005
- Location: Otago
- Also known as: Goldfields cavalcade Otago Goldfields Heritage Trust Cavalcade
- Organized by: Otago Goldfields Heritage Trust
- Website: https://cavalcade.co.nz/

The Otago Goldfields Cavalcade (officially the Otago Goldfields Heritage Trust Cavalcade) is an annual event in Otago, New Zealand. The cavalcade has run annually since its inception in 1991, and retraces the routes of wagons across country to the Dunstan goldfields around Cromwell. The original route, which established Cobb & Co.'s coach service, left Dunedin's Provincial Hotel on 22 November 1862. Present-day cavalcade routes vary each year in late February so as to finish in a different host town.

== History ==
The original idea to recreate the wagon route as an annual cavalcade came from Fleur Sullivan, who wanted to boost tourism to small Otago towns. Sullivan and Roberta Laraman, who co-ordinated the event for seventeen years, were honoured at the 25th anniversary cavalcade in 2017.

The first cavalcade in 1991 attracted 220 people and 240 horses, and retraced the route from Dunedin's Provincial Hotel to Dunstan goldfields. The original route, which established Cobb & Co.'s coach service, left Dunedin on 22 November 1862. The cavalcade originally took place in November, but was changed to February and March to take account of better weather. Present-day cavalcade routes vary each year in late February so as to finish in a different host town. Later events have allowed for horse-drawn wagons, coaches, walkers and cyclists to participate. The 2017 anniversary cavalcade attracted 500 participants.

In 2022 the event was cancelled due to COVID-19, but returned in 2023. By 2022, there were only four riders who had participated in every cavalcade since 1991, including the oldest rider, Alice Sinclair, who was 86 that year.
