= Tuapeka River =

River in New Zealand

Coordinates: 46°01′S 169°31′E

The Tuapeka River is a river located in Otago in the South Island of New Zealand. It is a tributary of the Clutha River, which it joins at Tuapeka Mouth between Roxburgh and Balclutha.

The Tuapeka's main claim to fame is as the centre of the Otago gold rush of the 1860s. The first major discovery of gold in Otago was at Gabriel's Gully, close to the Tuapeka, in 1861.

An earlier wooden crib dam was built further upstream in 1907. The concrete dam was begun in 1914. Water from the dam was conveyed on a water race to the turbine and sluicing area.
